= List of Australian animated films =

List of Australian animated films
Title	Director	Studio	Technique	Type	Notes	Release date	Duration
A Christmas Carol	Zoran Janjic	Air Programs International	Traditional	Television special	First Australian animated feature and the first American collaboration with another nation for an animated feature; later originally aired on 13 December 1970 as the third installment of the CBS anthology television series Famous Classic Tales (1970-1984).	20 November 1969	45 minutes
A Connecticut Yankee in King Arthur's Court	Zoran Janjic	Air Programs International	Traditional	Television film	Originally aired as the second installment of the CBS animated anthology series Famous Classic Tales (1970–1984).	26 November 1970	74 minutes
Marco Polo Junior Versus the Red Dragon	Eric Porter	Animation International Inc. Porter Animations	Traditional	Theatrical	First Australian animated theatrical feature.	1 December 1972	82 minutes
The Prince and the Pauper	Chris Cuddington	Air Programs International	Traditional	Television film	Originally aired as the 8th installment of the CBS animated anthology series Famous Classic Tales (1970–1984).	26 November 1972	60 minutes
Robinson Crusoe	Leif Gram	Air Programs International	Traditional	Television film	Originally aired as the 7th installment of the CBS animated anthology series Famous Classic Tales (1970–1984).	23 November 1972	47 minutes
Travels of Marco Polo	Leif Gram	Air Programs International	Traditional	Television film	Originally aired as the 6th installment of the CBS animated anthology series Famous Classic Tales (1970–1984).	1 January 1972	60 minutes
The Count of Monte Cristo	William Hanna; Joseph Barbera	Hanna-Barbera Australia	Traditional	Television special	Originally aired as the 9th installment of the CBS animated anthology series Famous Classic Tales (1970–1984).	23 September 1973	60 minutes
Twenty Thousand Leagues Under the Sea	William Hanna; Joseph Barbera	Hanna-Barbera Australia	Traditional	Television special	Originally aired as the 12th installment of the CBS animated anthology series Famous Classic Tales (1970–1984).	22 November 1973	60 minutes
Kidnapped	Leif Gram	Air Programs International	Traditional	Television special	Originally aired as the 10th installment of the CBS animated anthology series Famous Classic Tales (1970–1984).	22 October 1973	47 minutes
The Swiss Family Robinson	Leif Gram	Air Programs International	Traditional	Television special	Originally aired as the 11th installment of the CBS animated anthology series Famous Classic Tales (1970–1984).	28 October 1973	47 minutes
The Three Musketeers	William Hanna; Joseph Barbera	Hanna-Barbera Australia	Traditional	Television special	Originally aired as the 13th installment of the CBS animated anthology series Famous Classic Tales (1970–1984).	23 November 1973	50 Minutes
The Black Arrow	Leif Gram	Air Programs International	Traditional	Television special	Originally aired as the 14th installment of the CBS animated anthology series Famous Classic Tales (1970–1984).	2 December 1973	30 minutes
The Gentlemen of Titipu	Leif Gram	Air Programs International; Swank Telefilms	Traditional	Television special	Originally aired as the 15th installment of the CBS animated anthology series Famous Classic Tales (1970–1984).	15 January 1974	47 minutes
Ivanhoe	Leif Gram	Air Programs International	Traditional	Television special	Originally aired as the 19th installment of the CBS animated anthology series Famous Classic Tales (1970–1984).	27 November 1975	48 minutes
The Last of the Mohicans	Charles A. Nicholas	Hanna-Barbera Australia	Traditional	Television special	Originally aired as the 18th installment of the CBS animated anthology series Famous Classic Tales (1970–1984).	27 November 1975	60 minutes
The Mysterious Island	Leif Gram	Air Programs International	Traditional	Television special	Originally aired as the 17th installment of the CBS animated anthology series Famous Classic Tales (1970–1984).	15 November 1975	60 minutes
Dot and the Kangaroo	Yoram Gross	Yoram Gross Films; Hoyts	Traditional/Live action	Theatrical; Live-action animated film		15 December 1977	71 minutes
Davy Crockett on the Mississippi	Charles A. Nicholas	Hanna-Barbera Australia	Traditional	Television special	Originally aired as the 23rd installment of the CBS animated anthology series Famous Classic Tales (1970–1984).	20 November 1976	47 minutes
From the Earth to the Moon	Richard Slapczynski	Air Programs International	Traditional	Television special	Originally aired as the 20th installment of the CBS animated anthology series Famous Classic Tales (1970–1984).	1 January 1976	46 minutes
Master of the World	Leif Gram	Air Programs International	Traditional	Television special	Originally aired as the 22nd installment of the CBS animated anthology series Famous Classic Tales (1970–1984).	23 October 1976	60 minutes
Off on a Comet	Richard Slapczynski	Air Programs International	Traditional	Television special	Originally aired as the 21st installment of the CBS animated anthology series Famous Classic Tales (1970–1984).	1 January 1976	50 minutes
5 Weeks in a Balloon	Chris Cuddington	Hanna-Barbera	Traditional	Television special	Originally aired as the 25th installment of the CBS animated anthology series Famous Classic Tales (1970–1984).	24 November 1977	60 minutes
A Journey to the Center of the Earth	Richard Slapczynski	Air Programs International	Traditional	Television special	Originally aired as the 24th installment of the CBS animated anthology series Famous Classic Tales (1970–1984).	13 November 1977	60 minutes
Black Beauty	Chris Cuddington	Hanna-Barbera Australia	Traditional	Television special	Originally aired as the 26th installment of the CBS animated anthology series Famous Classic Tales (1970–1984).	28 October 1978	50 minutes
The Flintstones: Little Big League	Chris Cuddington	Hanna-Barbera Productions; Hanna-Barbera Pty, Ltd.	Traditional	Television special		6 April 1978	60 minutes
The Magic Flute; Il flauto magico	Emanuele Luzzati; Giuilio Gianini	Thalia Film	Traditional/Cutout/Live action	Theatrical			54 minutes
The Adventures of Sinbad	Richard Slapczynski	Air Programs International	Traditional	Television special	Originally aired as the 28th installment of the CBS animated anthology series Famous Classic Tales (1970–1984).	23 November 1979	47 minutes
Gulliver's Travels	Chris Cuddington	Hanna-Barbera Australia	Traditional	Television special	Originally aired as the 27th installment of the CBS animated anthology series Famous Classic Tales (1970–1984).	18 November 1979	60 minutes
The Little Convict	Yoram Gross	Yoram Gross Films Studio; Hoyts	Traditional / Live action	Theatrical; Live-action animated film		20 December 1979	80 minutes
Around the World with Dot a. k. a. Dot & Santa Claus	Yoram Gross	Yoram Gross Studios	Traditional/Live action	Theatrical		23 June 1981	80 minutes
Grendel Grendel Grendel	Alexander Stitt	Victorian Film	Traditional	Theatrical		9 July 1981	88 minutes
The Black Planet	Paul Williams	Fable Film Productions	Traditional				78 minutes
A Christmas Carol		Burbank Films Australia	Traditional	Television film		22 December 1982	75 minutes
Oliver Twist	Richard Slapczynski	Burbank Films Australia	Traditional	Television film	The inaugural production of Burbank Films Australia.	15 December 1982	72 minutes
Sarah	Yoram Gross; Athol Henry	Yoram Gross Films	Traditional				70 minutes
Abra Cadabra	Alex Stitt	Adams Packer Film Productions	Traditional	Theatrical	First ever animated feature to be made in 3D.	July 1983	84 minutes
Dot and the Bunny	Yoram Gross	Yoram Gross Films	Traditional/Live action	Theatrical; Live-action animated film		3 April 1983	81 minutes
Sherlock Holmes and a Study in Scarlet		Burbank Films Australia	Traditional	Television film		15 January 1983	50 minutes
Sherlock Holmes and the Baskerville Curse		Burbank Films Australia	Traditional	Television film		16 January 1983	67 minutes
Sherlock Holmes and the Sign of Four		Burbank Films Australia	Traditional	Television film		13 January 1983	50 minutes
Sherlock Holmes and the Valley of Fear		Burbank Films Australia	Traditional	Television film		14 January 1983	50 minutes
The Camel Boy	Yoram Gross	Yoram Gross Studios	Traditional	Theatrical		8 May 1984	72 minutes
The Phantom Treehouse	Paul Williams	Fable Film Productions; Phantom Treehouse Ltd.	Traditional			?	76 minutes
20,000 Leagues Under the Sea		Burbank Films Australia	Traditional	Television film		17 December 1985	50 minutes
The Adventures of Robin Hood		Burbank Films Australia	Traditional	Television film		13 July 1985	50 minutes
Dot and the Koala	Yoram Gross	Yoram Gross Films; Hoyts	Traditional/Live action	Theatrical		20 June 1985	71 minutes
Epic	Yoram Gross	Yoram Gross Films	Traditional			14 May 1985	70 minutes
The Man in the Iron Mask		Burbank Films Australia	Traditional	Television film		26 July 1985	54 minutes
Nicholas Nickleby		Burbank Films Australia	Traditional	Television film		16 March 1985	72 minutes
The Pickwick Papers		Burbank Films Australia	Traditional	Television film		26 March 1985	71 minutes
The Adventures of Tom Sawyer		Burbank Films Australia	Traditional	Television film		2 July 1986	51 minutes
Dot and Keeto	Yoram Gross	Yoram Gross Films	Traditional/Live action	Theatrical		22 May 1986	75 minutes
Dot and the Whale	Yoram Gross	Yoram Gross Films	Traditional/Live action	Theatrical		30 October 1986	75 minutes
Dr. Jekyll and Mr. Hyde		Burbank Films Australia	Traditional	Television film		10 July 1986	50 minutes
The Hunchback of Notre Dame		Burbank Films Australia	Traditional	Television film		21 December 1986	52 minutes
Ivanhoe		Burbank Films Australia	Traditional	Television film		14 September 1986	55 minutes
Kidnapped		Burbank Films Australia	Traditional	Television film		21 June 1986	55 minutes
King Solomon's Mines		Burbank Films Australia	Traditional	Television film		25 June 1986	55 minutes
The Three Musketeers		Burbank Films Australia	Traditional	Television film		4 October 1986	54 minutes
Alice Through the Looking Glass	Andrea Bresciani; Richard Slapczynski	Burbank Films Australia; Jambre Productions	Traditional	Television film		15 May 1987	73 minutes
Black Beauty	David Cherkasskiy	Burbank Films Australia	Traditional	Television film		19 June 1987	50 minutes
Don Quixote of La Mancha	?	Burbank Films Australia	Traditional	Television film		1 January 1987	55 minutes
Dot and the Smugglers a. k. a. Dot and the Bunyip	Yoram Gross	Yoram Gross Studios	Traditional	Theatrical		4 April 1987	75 minutes
Dot Goes to Hollywood a. k. a. Dot in Concert	Yoram Gross	Yoram Gross Studios	Traditional	Theatrical		9 July 1987	73 minutes
The Last of the Mohicans	?	Burbank Films Australia	Traditional	Television film		31 July 1987	55 minutes
The Odyssey	?	Burbank Films Australia	Traditional	Television film		19 November 1987	55 minutes
Rob Roy	?	Burbank Films Australia	Traditional	Television film		5 July 1987	48 minutes
Treasure Island	Warwick Gilbert	Burbank Films Australia	Traditional	Television film		25 December 1987	50 minutes
Wind in the Willows	Geoff Collins	Burbank Films Australia	Traditional	Television film		13 December 1988	50 minutes
Westward Ho!		Burbank Films Australia	Traditional	Television film		1 May 1988	55 minutes
Prisoner of Zenda		Burbank Films Australia	Traditional	Television film		9 May 1988	48 minutes
Peter Pan	?	Burbank Films Australia	Traditional	Television film		23 June 1988	46 minutes
Hiawatha		Burbank Films Australia	Traditional	Television film		15 June 1988	50 minutes
The Black Arrow		Burbank Films Australia	Traditional	Television film		18 October 1988	55 minutes
Black Tulip		Burbank Films Australia	Traditional	Television film		10 February 1988	49 minutes
Around the World in 80 Days		Burbank Films Australia	Traditional	Television film		25 November 1988	49 minutes
Alice in Wonderland		Burbank Films Australia	Traditional	Television film		10 July 1988	51 minutes
The Corsican Brothers		Burbank Films Australia	Traditional	Television film		7 July 1989	49 minutes
White Fang	?	Burbank Animation Studios	Traditional	Television film	?	?	50 minutes
The Magic Riddle	Yoram Gross	Yoram Gross Films	Traditional	Theatrical		19 September 1991	93 minutes
Goldilocks and the Three Bears		Burbank Animation Studios	Traditional	Television film			49 minutes
Hans and the Silver Skates		Burbank Animation Studios	Traditional	Television film			50 minutes
Frank Enstein		Burbank Animation Studios	Traditional	Television film			50 minutes
The Emperor's New Clothes	Richard Slapczynski	Burbank Animation Studios	Traditional	Television film			50 minutes
The Count of Monte-Cristo		Burbank Animation Studios	Traditional	Television film			50 minutes
Ali Baba	Douglas Richards; Richard Slapczynski	Burbank Animation Studios	Traditional	Television film	?	?	50 minutes
The Pied Piper of Hamlin		Burbank Animation Studios	Traditional	Direct-to-video			50 minutes
The New Adventures of William Tell	Douglas Richards	Burbank Animation Studios	Traditional	Direct-to-video			50 minutes
The New Adventures of Robin Hood		Burbank Animation Studios	Traditional	Television film			48 minutes
FernGully: The Last Rainforest	Bill Kroyer	Kroyer Films; A. Film A/S; FAI Films; 20th Century Fox (distributor)	Traditional	Theatrical		10 April 1992	76 minutes
Blinky Bill: The Mischievous Koala	Yoram Gross	Yoram Gross Films Studio	Traditional	Theatrical		17 September 1992	97 minutes
Thumbelina	Richard Slapczynski	Burbank Animation Studios	Traditional	Television film			50 minutes
Puss in Boots	Richard Slapczynski	Burbank Animation Studios; Holric Entertainment Group; INI Entertainment Group	Traditional	Television film			50 minutes
The Fantastic Voyages of Sinbad	Douglas Richards	Burbank Animation Studios	Traditional	Television film			50 minutes
Dot in Space	Yoram Gross	Yoram Gross Studios	Traditional	Theatrical	Ninth and final installment in the Australian Dot animated film series.	19 June 1994	63 minutes
Goldilocks and the Three Bears	Richard Slapczynski	Burbank Animation Studios	Traditional	Direct-to-video		1 January 1994	49 minutes
Pocahontas		Burbank Animation Studios; Anchor Bay Studios (distributor)	Traditional	Direct-to-video		16 October 1995	50 minutes
Beauty and the Beast		Burbank Animation Studios	Traditional	Television film		1996	50 minutes
Cinderella		Burbank Animation Studios	Traditional	Television film		1996	51 minutes
Hansel and Gretel		Burbank Animation Studios	Traditional	Television film			50 minutes
The Hunchback of Notre Dame		Burbank Animation Studios	Traditional	Television film			50 minutes
Go to Hell!!	Ray Nowland		Traditional	Theatrical		1997	73 minutes
The Spirit of Mickey		Walt Disney Productions; Walt Disney Home Video	Traditional	Direct-to-video; Compilation film	Film compiled from Disney theatrical animated shorts and footage from Walt Disney's Wonderful World of Color and The Mickey Mouse Club; originally made to coincide with Mickey Mouse's 70th anniversary that year.	14 July 1998	83 minutes
Prince of the Nile: The Story of Moses		Burbank Animation Studios	Traditional	Direct-to-video			50 minutes
Mulan	Geoff Beak; Susan Beak	Burbank Animation Studios	Traditional	Direct-to-video			50 minutes
The Little Mermaid	Geoff Beak; Susan Beak	Burbank Animation Studios	Traditional	Direct-to-video			50 minutes
Camelot		Burbank Animation Studios	Traditional	Direct-to-video		24 March 1998	50 minutes
The Three Little Pigs		Burbank Animation Studios	Traditional	Direct-to-video			
D4: The Trojan Dog		Burbank Animation Studios	Traditional	Television film			50 minutes
The Magic Pudding	Karl Zwicky	New South Wales Film and Television Office; Australian Broadcasting Corporation; Premium Movie Partnership	Traditional	Theatrical		14 December 2000	80 minutes
Lady and the Tramp II: Scamp's Adventure	Darrell Rooney; Jeannine Roussel	Walt Disney Home Video; Walt Disney Animation Australia; Disney Television Animation	Traditional	Direct-to-video		27 February 2001	69 minutes
Kangaroo Jack	David McNally	Warner Bros. Pictures	CG animation/Live-Action	Theatrical		17 January 2003	89 minutes
Happy Feet	George Miller, Warren Coleman, Judy Morris	Warner Bros. Pictures; Village Roadshow Pictures; Animal Logic	CG animation	Theatrical		17 November 2006 (United States); 26 December 2006 (Australia)	108 minutes
$9.99	Tatia Rosenthal	Lama Films	Stop motion			4 September 2008 (Toronto)	78 minutes
Mary and Max	Adam Elliot	Melodrama Pictures	Stop motion			15 January 2009 (Sundance Film Festival); 9 April 2009 (Australia)	90 minutes
Santa's Apprentice; L'Apprenti Père Noël	Luc Vinciguerra	Gaumont-Alphanim, Avrill Stark Entertainment	Traditional			24 November 2010	77 minutes
Legend of the Guardians: The Owls of Ga'Hoole	Zack Snyder	Village Roadshow Pictures, Animal Logic, Cruel and Unusual Films	CG animation			24 September 2010 (United States); 30 September 2010 (Australia)	97 minutes
Cats & Dogs: The Revenge of Kitty Galore	Brad Peyton	Warner Bros. Pictures	CG animation/Live-Action			30 July 2010	82 minutes
Happy Feet Two	George Miller	Dr. D Studios / Warner Bros.	CG animation			13 November 2011 (Grauman's Chinese Theatre); 18 November 2011 (United States); 26 December 2011 (Australia)	100 minutes
Exchange Student Zero	Bruce Kane; Patrick Crawley	Bogan Entertainment	Traditional			16 December 2012	70 minutes
Saving Mr. Banks	John Lee Hancock	Walt Disney Pictures; Ruby Films; Essential Media and Entertainment; BBC Films; Hopscotch Features	Live-Action/Traditional Animation			20 October 2013 (BFI London Film Festival); 29 November 2013 (United Kingdom); 13 December 2013 (United States); 9 January 2014 (Australia)	125 minutes
Walking with Dinosaurs	Neil Nightingale, Barry Cook	Reliance Entertainment, IM Global, BBC Earth Films, Evergreen Studios, Animal Logic	CG animation		Theatrical	14 December 2013 (Dubai Int'l Film Festival); 20 December 2013 (United States)	87 minutes
The Lego Movie	Phil Lord, Chris Miller	Warner Bros., Animal Logic, Lego	CG animation		Theatrical	1 February 2014 (Regency Village Theater); 6 February 2014 (Denmark); 7 February 2014 (United States); 3 April 2014 (Australia)	100 minutes
Maya the Bee	Alexs Stadermann	Screen Australia, Buzz Studios, Studio 100 Animation	CG animation			4 September 2014 (South Korea); 11 September 2014 (Germany); 1 November 2014 (Australia)	87 minutes
Blinky Bill the Movie	Deane Taylor	Flying Bark Productions; Telegael; Screen Australia; Studio 100 Animation; Screen NSW; Lusomundo; StudioCanal	CG animation			17 September 2015	93 minutes
Maya the Bee: The Honey Games	Noel Cleary, Sergio Delfino, Alexs Stadermann	UFA GmbH	CG animation			1 March 2018 (Germany); 1 May 2018 (United States); 26 July 2018 (Australia)	85 minutes
Peter Rabbit	Will Gluck	Sony Pictures Animation	Live-Action / CG animation			3 February 2018 (The Grove); 9 February 2018 (United States); 16 March 2018 (United Kingdom); 22 March 2018 (Australia)	95 minutes
Alice-Miranda Friends Forever	Jo Boag	SLR Productions	Flash animation			14 November 2019	83 minutes
The Wishmas Tree	Ricard Cussó	Like a Photon Creative	CG animation			5 October 2019 (Brisbane International Film Festival); 27 February 2020 (Australia)	90 minutes
Arkie	Luke Jurevicius	Nitrogen Studios; Passion Pictures; Luma	CG animation	Based on Scarygirl			
The Lego Movie 2: The Second Part	Mike Mitchell	Warner Animation Group	CG animation			2 February 2019 (Regency Village Theatre); 7 February 2019 (Denmark); 8 February 2019 (United States); 21 March 2019 (Australia)	107 minutes
100% Wolf	Alexs Stadermann	Flying Bark Productions and Siamese Pty Ltd.	CG animation			29 May 2020	96 minutes
Combat Wombat	Ricard Cussó	Like A Photon Creative	CG animation			11 October 2020 (Brisbane International Film Festival); 15 October 2020 (Australia)	80 minutes
Daisy Quokka: World's Scariest Animal	Ricard Cussó	Like a Photon Creative	CG animation			28 November 2020 (Children's International Film Festival); January 2021 (Australia)	89 minutes
Alice-Miranda A Royal Christmas Ball	Jo Boag	SLR Productions	Flash animation			15 October 2021	81 minutes
Maya the Bee: The Golden Orb	Noel Cleary	Buzz Studios; Studio 100 Animation	CG animation			7 January 2021	88 minutes
Peter Rabbit 2: The Runaway	Will Gluck	Columbia Pictures	CG animation Live-Action			25 March 2021 (Australia); 17 May 2021 (United Kingdom); 11 June 2021 (United States)	93 minutes
Mia and Me: The Hero of Centopia	Adam Gunn	Studio 100 Animation; Studio B Animation; Broadvision Services; Flying Bark Productions; Constantin Film; Hahn Film AG	CG animation Live-action			26 May 2022	85 minutes
Leo	Robert Marianetti; David Wachtenheim; Robert Smigel	Netflix Animation; Happy Madison Productions; Animal Logic	CG animation			21 November 2023	102 minutes
The Magician's Elephant	Wendy Rogers	Netflix Animation; Animal Logic	CG animation			17 March 2023	100 minutes
Scarygirl	Ricard Cussó; Tania Vincent	Highly Spirited; Passion Pictures Australia; Particular Crowd; Like A Photon Creative	CG animation			17 June 2023 (Sydney Film Festival); 26 October 2023 (Australia)	90 minutes
Combat Wombat: Back 2 Back	Ricard Cussó; Tania Vincent	Like A Photon Creative; Screen Australia	CG animation			28 October 2023 (Brisbane International Film Festival); 29 February 2024 (Australia)	81 minutes
The Sloth Lane	Tania Vincent; Ricard Cussó	Like A Photon Creative; Screen Queensland Studios	CG animation			10 June 2024 (Annecy); 15 June 2024 (Sydney); 25 July 2024 (Australia)	89 minutes
200% Wolf	Alexs Stadermann	Flying Bark Productions	CG animation			8 August 2024	85 minutes
Memoir of a Snail	Adam Elliot	Arenamedia; Snails Pace Films	Stop-Motion			10 June 2024 (Annecy); 17 October 2024 (Australia)	94 minutes
Lesbian Space Princess	Emma Hough Hobbs; Leela Varghese	We Made A Thing Studios	Traditional			27 October 2024 (Adelaide)	86 minutes
The Lost Tiger	Chantelle Murray	Like A Photon Creative	CG animation			26 October 2024 (Brisbane International Film Festival); 27 February 2025 (Australia)	81 minutes
My Freaky Family	Mark Gravas	Pop Family Entertainment; Telegael	CG animation			31 October 2024	86 minutes
The Pout-Pout Fish	Ricard Cussó; Rio Harrington	MIMO Studios; Like A Photon Creative	CG animation			1 January 2026 (Australia); 20 March 2026 (United States)	92 minutes
A Super Progressive Movie	Sebastian Peart	Stepmates Studios	Flash animation			26 January 2026	86 minutes
