= List of Universal Pictures theatrical animated feature films =

This is a list of theatrical animated feature films released by Universal Pictures, the film division of Comcast's NBCUniversal.

Universal Pictures releases films from Universal-owned and non-Universal owned animation studios. Most films listed below are from Illumination which began as the feature animation department of Universal, producing its first feature-length animated film Despicable Me in 2010. Beginning with How to Train Your Dragon: The Hidden World in 2019, Universal also released animated films by DreamWorks Animation, which was acquired by NBCUniversal in 2016. Other studio units have also released films theatrically, including Universal Animation Studios, which now focuses mainly on animating television shows and direct-to-video films.

The studio's distribution unit acquires film rights from outside animation studios to release films under the Universal Pictures or Focus Features film labels. For example, Laika's stop-motion animated features were released by Universal through its Focus Features label. Other studios globally have released films through Universal Pictures which maintains distribution rights in certain territories.

== Films ==
Color legend
Universal Animation Studios (2006–present)	
Illumination (2010–present)	
DreamWorks Animation (2019–present)	
Other Universal studio	
Third-party studio	
Live-action/animation hybrid sold as animation	^{S}
Live-action/animation hybrid sold as live-action	^{SL}
Distribution only	^{D}
An adult animated production	^{A}

=== American releases ===
Title	Original theatrical release date (Note: Listed are the original theatrical release dates in the United States (or other non-U.S. territories) when the film was contributed by Universal. Different distributors are attributed and credited for distributing each film throughout the history of Universal.)	Animation studio
The Snow Queen^{[D]}^{[S]}	November 20, 1959 (Note: Original Soviet release date was November 15, 1957) (Note: Released by Universal Pictures in North America)	Soyuzmultfilm
Pinocchio in Outer Space^{[D]}	December 22, 1965	Belvision Studios
The Dark Crystal^{[D]}^{[SL]}	December 17, 1982	ITC Entertainment and The Jim Henson Company
Howard the Duck^{[D]}^{[SL]}^{[A]}	August 1, 1986	Lucasfilm and Marvel Comics Group
An American Tail	November 21, 1986	Amblin Entertainment and Sullivan Bluth Studios
The Land Before Time	November 18, 1988	Amblin Entertainment and Sullivan Bluth Studios
Jetsons: The Movie^{[D]}	July 6, 1990	Hanna-Barbera
An American Tail: Fievel Goes West	November 22, 1991	Amblimation
We're Back! A Dinosaur's Story	November 24, 1993	Amblimation
The Flintstones^{[D]}^{[SL]}	May 27, 1994	Amblin Entertainment and Hanna-Barbera Productions
Babe^{[D]}^{[SL]}	August 4, 1995	Kennedy Miller Productions
Balto^{[S]}	December 22, 1995	Amblimation
Babe: Pig in the City^{[D]}^{[SL]}	November 25, 1998	Kennedy Miller Productions
The Flintstones in Viva Rock Vegas^{[D]}^{[SL]}	April 28, 2000	Amblin Entertainment and Hanna-Barbera Productions
The Adventures of Rocky and Bullwinkle^{[S]}	June 30, 2000	Jay Ward Productions and TriBeCa Productions
How the Grinch Stole Christmas^{[D]}^{[SL]}	November 17, 2000	Imagine Entertainment
The Cat in the Hat^{[SL]}	November 21, 2003	DreamWorks Pictures and Imagine Entertainment
Peter Pan^{[SL]}	December 25, 2003	Columbia Pictures, Revolution Studios, Red Wagon Entertainment and Allied Stars Ltd
Curious George	February 10, 2006	Universal Animation Studios and Imagine Entertainment
The Pirates Who Don't Do Anything: A VeggieTales Movie^{[D]}	January 11, 2008	Big Idea Entertainment and Starz Animation
The Tale of Despereaux	December 19, 2008	Relativity Media and Framestore Animation
Land of the Lost^{[D]}^{[SL]}^{[A]}	June 5, 2009	Relativity Media, Sid & Marty Krofft Pictures and Mosaic Media Group
Despicable Me	July 9, 2010	Illumination
Paul^{[SL]}^{[A]}	March 18, 2011	Relativity Media, Working Title Films, Big Talk Pictures and StudioCanal
Hop^{[S]}	April 1, 2011	Illumination and Relativity Media
The Lorax	March 2, 2012	Illumination
Despicable Me 2	July 3, 2013	Illumination
Minions	July 10, 2015	Illumination
Krampus^{[D]}^{[SL]}^{[A]}	December 4, 2015	Legendary Pictures and Zam Pictures
The Secret Life of Pets	July 8, 2016	Illumination
Sing	December 21, 2016	Illumination
Despicable Me 3	June 30, 2017	Illumination
The House with a Clock in Its Walls^{[D]}^{[SL]}	September 21, 2018	Amblin Entertainment, Reliance Entertainment and Mythology Entertainment
The Grinch	November 9, 2018	Illumination
How to Train Your Dragon: The Hidden World	February 22, 2019	DreamWorks Animation
The Secret Life of Pets 2	June 7, 2019	Illumination
Abominable	September 27, 2019	DreamWorks Animation and Pearl Studio
Cats^{[SL]}	December 20, 2019	Amblin Entertainment, Working Title Films, Perfect World Pictures, Monumental Pictures and The Really Useful Group
Dolittle^{[D]}^{[SL]}	January 17, 2020	R/K Films, Team Downey Productions and Perfect World Pictures
Trolls World Tour	April 10, 2020	DreamWorks Animation
The Croods: A New Age	November 25, 2020	DreamWorks Animation
Spirit Untamed	June 4, 2021	DreamWorks Animation
The Boss Baby: Family Business	July 2, 2021	DreamWorks Animation
Sing 2	December 22, 2021	Illumination
The Bad Guys	April 22, 2022	DreamWorks Animation
Minions: The Rise of Gru	July 1, 2022	Illumination
Puss in Boots: The Last Wish	December 21, 2022	DreamWorks Animation
The Super Mario Bros. Movie	April 5, 2023	Illumination and Nintendo
Ruby Gillman, Teenage Kraken	June 30, 2023	DreamWorks Animation
Strays^{[D]}^{[SL]}^{[A]}	August 18, 2023	Lord Miller Productions, Picturestart and Rabbit Hole Productions
Trolls Band Together	November 17, 2023	DreamWorks Animation
Migration	December 22, 2023	Illumination
Kung Fu Panda 4	March 8, 2024	DreamWorks Animation
Despicable Me 4	July 3, 2024	Illumination
The Wild Robot	September 27, 2024	DreamWorks Animation
Dog Man	January 31, 2025	DreamWorks Animation and Scholastic Entertainment
How to Train Your Dragon^{[SL]}	June 13, 2025	DreamWorks Animation and Marc Platt Productions
The Bad Guys 2	August 1, 2025	DreamWorks Animation
Gabby's Dollhouse: The Movie^{[S]}	September 26, 2025	DreamWorks Animation
The Super Mario Galaxy Movie	April 1, 2026	Illumination and Nintendo
Minions & Monsters	July 1, 2026	Illumination
Forgotten Island	September 25, 2026	DreamWorks Animation

=== Upcoming ===
Title	Intended theatrical release date by Universal Pictures	Animation studio
CoComelon: The Movie^{[D]}	February 19, 2027	DreamWorks Animation, Moonbug Entertainment, Flywheel Media, and Prime Focus Studios
Not Alone	April 16, 2027	Illumination
How to Train Your Dragon 2^{[SL]}	June 11, 2027	DreamWorks Animation and Marc Platt Productions
Shrek 5	June 30, 2027	DreamWorks Animation
Nico Bravo	September 24, 2027	DreamWorks Animation
Untitled Illumination/Nintendo film	April 12, 2028	Illumination and Nintendo
Donkey	June 30, 2028	DreamWorks Animation
Untitled DreamWorks Animation film	September 22, 2028	DreamWorks Animation
Untitled third Super Mario film	2029	Illumination and Nintendo
Untitled Illumination film	June 29, 2029	Illumination
Untitled DreamWorks Animation film	September 21, 2029	DreamWorks Animation
Untitled Illumination film	July 3, 2030	Illumination
Undated
Barbie	TBA	Illumination and Mattel Studios
Lego^{[S]}	TBA	The Lego Group and Rideback
The Wild Robot Escapes	TBA	DreamWorks Animation

=== International releases ===
Title	Original theatrical release date (Note: Listed are the original theatrical release dates in the United States (or other non-U.S. territories) when the film was contributed by Universal. Different distributors are attributed and credited for distributing each film throughout the history of Universal.)	Animation studio
The Abrafaxe – Under The Black Flag^{[D]}	October 25, 2001 (Germany) (Note: Released by Universal outside North America)	Abrafaxe Trickfilm
Momo^{[D]}	December 21, 2001 (Italy)	Taurus Produktion
Coraline^{[D]}	February 5, 2009	Laika (Note: Released by Focus Features.)
Curious George 2: Follow That Monkey!	July 10, 2009 (Denmark) (Note: Not released theatrically in the United States, released as DTV film)	Universal Animation Studios and Imagine Entertainment
9^{[D]}	September 9, 2009	Relativity Media, Lux Animation, Starz Animation and Tim Burton Productions
Nikté^{[D]}	December 18, 2009 (Mexico)	Animex Producciones
Judy Moody and the Not Bummer Summer^{[SL]}	June 10, 2011	Relativity Media and Smokewood Entertainment
ParaNorman^{[D]}	August 17, 2012	Laika
Underdogs^{[D]}	July 18, 2013 (Argentina)	Prana Studios and 100 Bares Producciones
Moshi Monsters: The Movie^{[D]}	December 20, 2013	Spider Eye Productions
Song of the Sea^{[D]}	September 6, 2014 (Ireland)	StudioCanal and Cartoon Saloon
The Seventh Dwarf^{[D]}	September 25, 2014 (Germany)	Zipfelmützen Film GmbH & Co. KG
The Boxtrolls^{[D]}	September 26, 2014	Laika
Yellowbird^{[D]}	October 11, 2014	TeamTO
Mune: Guardian of the Moon^{[D]}	October 14, 2015 (France)	On Animation Studios, Onyx Films, Kinology and Orange Studio
Ratchet & Clank^{[D]}	April 29, 2016	Rainmaker Entertainment and Blockade Entertainment (Note: Released by Gramercy Pictures.)
Kubo and the Two Strings^{[D]}	August 19, 2016	Laika
Ethel & Ernest^{[D]}	October 28, 2016	Cloth Cat Animation
The Breadwinner^{[D]}	September 8, 2017 (Canada)	Elevation Pictures, StudioCanal, and Cartoon Saloon
Woody Woodpecker^{[SL]}	October 5, 2017 (Brazil)	Universal Animation Studios and Cinemotion
Zombillenium^{[D]}	October 18, 2017 (France)	Maybe Movies and Belvision
The Boss Baby	March 21, 2018 (Japan) (Note: Released by Universal in Japan)	DreamWorks Animation
The Addams Family^{[D]}	October 11, 2019	Metro-Goldwyn-Mayer and Cinesite (Note: Released theatrically by MGM in USA)
The Wishmas Tree^{[D]}	February 27, 2020 (Australia)	Like a Photon Creative
Combat Wombat^{[D]}	October 15, 2020 (Australia)	Like a Photon Creative
Daisy Quokka: World's Scariest Animal^{[D]}	November 28, 2020 (Australia)	Like a Photon Creative
The Addams Family 2^{[D]}	October 1, 2021	Metro-Goldwyn-Mayer and Cinesite
Marcel the Shell with Shoes On^{[D]}^{[SL]}	February 17, 2023 (United Kingdom)	A24, Cinereach, You Want I Should, Human Woman, Sunbeam Television & Films, and Chiodo Bros. Productions
Mavka: The Forest Song^{[D]}	March 29, 2023 (France)	Animagrad Animation Studio and Film.UA
Orion and the Dark	February 2, 2024	DreamWorks Animation (Note: Released on Netflix)
Combat Wombat: Back 2 Back^{[D]}	February 29, 2024 (Australia)	Like a Photon Creative
Woody Woodpecker Goes to Camp^{[SL]}	April 12, 2024	Universal Animation Studios
Spy x Family Code: White^{[D]}	April 25, 2024 (Netherlands) (Note: Released theatrically and distributed in select international markets, including Netherlands, by Universal Pictures, released by Crunchyroll in US.)	Toho, Wit Studio and CloverWorks
The Sloth Lane^{[D]}	July 25, 2024 (Australia)	Like a Photon Creative
Piece by Piece^{[D]}	October 11, 2024	The Lego Group, Tremolo Productions, and I Am Other
The Night Before Christmas in Wonderland^{[D]}	November 15, 2024	Lupus Films
The Lost Tiger^{[D]}	February 27, 2025 (Australia)	Like a Photon Creative

== Highest-grossing films ==
† indicates films playing in theaters around the world in the week commencing 20 November 2026.

This list does not include films combining live-action with animation.

Rank	Film	Worldwide gross	Studio	Year	Ref.
1	The Super Mario Bros. Movie	$1,363,298,473	Illumination and Nintendo	2023	
2	Minions	$1,159,398,397	Illumination	2015	
3	Despicable Me 3	$1,034,799,409	Illumination	2017	
4	The Super Mario Galaxy Movie	$1,011,096,833	Illumination and Nintendo	2026	
5	Despicable Me 2	$970,761,885	Illumination	2013	
6	Despicable Me 4	$968,240,710	Illumination	2024	
7	Minions: The Rise of Gru	$939,628,210	Illumination	2022	
8	The Secret Life of Pets	$875,457,937	Illumination	2016	
9	Sing	$634,151,679	Illumination	2016	
10	Kung Fu Panda 4	$546,362,086	DreamWorks Animation	2024	

== See also ==
- List of Universal Pictures films
- List of DreamWorks Animation productions
  - List of unproduced DreamWorks Animation projects
- List of Illumination productions
- List of unproduced Universal Pictures animated projects
- List of works produced by Filmation

== Notes ==
Release Notes

Studio/Production Notes

Rights Notes
