= List of Australian films of 2020 =

This is a list of Australian films that were released in 2020.

== Films ==
| Opening | | Title | Production company | Cast and crew | Ref. |
|---|---|---|---|---|---|
| J A N U A R Y | 7 | True History of the Kelly Gang | Porchlight Fims / Daybreak Pictures / Memento Films | Justin Kurzel (director); George MacKay, Essie Davis, Nicholas Hoult, Orlando Schwert, Thomasin McKenzie | |
| J A N U A R Y | 16 | Go Karts | See Pictures | Owen Trevor (director); William Lodder, Anastasia Bampos, Frances O'Connor, Richard Roxburgh, Adam T Perkin | |
| F E B R U A R Y | 6 | H Is for Happiness | Cyan Films / The Koop / Screen Australia | John Sheedy (director); Daisy Axon, Wesley Patten, Richard Roxburgh, Emma Booth, Miriam Margolyes | |
| F E B R U A R Y | 27 | The Invisible Man | Blumhouse Productions / Goalpost Pictures / Nervous Tick Productions | Leigh Whannell (director); Elisabeth Moss, Aldis Hodge, Storm Reid, Harriet Dyer, Michael Dorman | |
| F E B R U A R Y | 27 | Miss Fisher and the Crypt of Tears | Every Cloud Productions | Tony Tilse (director); Deb Cox (screenplay); Essie Davis, Nathan Page, Miriam Margolyes, Ashleigh Cummings, Hugo Johnstone-Burt | |
| F E B R U A R Y | 27 | The Wishmas Tree | Like a Photon Creative | Ricard Cussó (director); Miranda Tapsell, Ross Noble, Kate Murphy, Ricard Cussó, Ryan Renshaw | |
| F E B R U A R Y | 28 | Aiyai: Wrathful Soul | GVKM Elephant Pictures / Aiyai Pty Ltd | Ilanthirayan Alan Arumugam (director/screenplay); Charles Benedict, Mukund Ramanan (screenplay); Kabir Singh, Tahlia Jade Holt, Korey Williams, Anthony Miller, Salvatore Merenda | |
| M A Y | 6 | Hearts and Bones | Night Kitchen Productions | Ben Lawrence (director/screenplay); Beatrix Christian (screenplay); Hugo Weaving, Andrew Luri, Hayley McElhinney, Bolude Watson | |
| M A Y | 22 | Escape from Pretoria | South Australian Film Corporation / Particular Crowd / Spier Films | Francis Annan (director); Daniel Radcliffe, Daniel Webber, Ian Hart, Mark Leonard Winter, Nathan Page | |
| M A Y | 29 | 100% Wolf | Flying Bark Productions / Siamese Pty Ltd. | Alexs Stadermann (director/screenplay); Jai Courtney, Samara Weaving, Magda Szubanski, Rhys Darby, Akmal Saleh | |
| J U L Y | 21 | Blood Vessel | Storm Vision Entertainment / SunJive Studios / Wicked of Oz Studios | Justin Dix (director); Alyssa Sutherland, Nathan Phillips, Christopher Kirby, John Lloyd Fillingham, Alex Cooke | |
| J U L Y | 23 | Babyteeth | Screen Australia / Entertainment One / Whitefalk Films | Shannon Murphy (director); Rita Kalnejais (screenplay); Eliza Scanlen, Toby Wallace, Emily Barclay, Eugene Gilfedder, Essie Davis | |
| A U G U S T | 7 | Black Water: Abyss | Thrills & Spills / Cornerstone Pictures / ProdigyMovies | Andrew Traucki (director); Jessica McNamee, Luke Mitchell, Amali Golden, Benjamin Hoetjes, Anthony Sharpe | |
| A U G U S T | 20 | Sequin in a Blue Room | Sequin in a Blue Room / AFTRS | Samuel Van Grinsven (director); Conor Leach, Simon Croker, Anthony Brandon Wong, Jeremy Lindsay Taylor, Samuel Barrie | |
| A U G U S T | 28 | I Am Woman | Goalpost Pictures / Screen Australia / Cowlick Entertainment | Unjoo Moon (director); Tilda Cobham-Hervey, Danielle Macdonald, Evan Peters, Molly Broadstock, Chris Parnell | |
| S E P T E M B E R | 10 | Slim and I | Pictures in Paradise / Slim Dusty Enterprises | Kriv Stenders (director); Slim Dusty, Joy McKean | |
| O C T O B E R | 8 | Bloody Hell | Eclectik Vision / Entertainment Squad / Heart Sleeve Productions | Alister Grierson (director); Robert Benjamin (screenplay); Ben O'Toole, Caroline Craig, Matthew Sunderland, Travis Jeffery, Jack Finsterer | |
| O C T O B E R | 8 | Dirt Music | Wildgaze Films / Aquarius Films / Cornerstone Pictures | Gregor Jordan (director); Jack Thorne (screenplay); Garrett Hedlund, Kelly Macdonald, David Wenham, Julia Stone, Ava Caryofyllis | |
| O C T O B E R | 15 | Combat Wombat | Like a Photon Creative | Ricard Cussó (director); Deborah Mailman, Ed Oxenbould, Frank Woodley, Judith Lucy | |
| O C T O B E R | 29 | Rams | WBMC | Jeremy Sims (director); Sam Neill, Michael Caton, Miranda Richardson, Asher Keddie, Wayne Blair | |
| O C T O B E R | 29 | Never Too Late | Screen Australia / F.G. Film Productions / South Australian Film Corporation | Mark Lamprell (director); Luke Preston (screenplay); James Cromwell, Dennis Waterman, Roy Billing, Shane Jacobson Jack Thompson | |
| N O V E M B E R | 7 | Brazen Hussies | Film Camp Pty Ltd / Brazen Hussies Film Pty Ltd | Catherine Dwyer (director) | |
| N O V E M B E R | 11 | Television Event | Impact Partners / Common Room Productions | Jeff Daniels (director); Nicholas Meyer, Stephanie Austen, Ted Koppel, Robert Papazian, Brandon Stoddard | |
| N O V E M B E R | 19 | Ellie & Abbie (& Ellie's Dead Aunt) | Head Gear Films | Monica Zanetti (director); Sophie Hawkshaw, Zoe Terakes, Marta Dusseldorp, Rachel House, Julia Billington | |
| D E C E M B E R | 10 | The Furnace | Umbrella Entertainment | Roderick MacKay (director); Ahmed Malek, Baykali Ganambarr, David Wenham, Kaushik Das, Noah Skape | |

== See also ==
- 2020 in Australia
- 2020 in Australian television
- List of 2020 box office number-one films in Australia
