= List of animated feature films of 2020 =

This is a list of animated feature films that were released in 2020.

== List ==
Title	Country	Director	Production company	Animation technique	Notes	Type	Release date	Duration
100% Wolf	Australia	Alexs Stadermann	Flying Bark Productions; Siamese Pty Ltd.	CG animation			May 29, 2020	96 minutes
ACCA: 13-Territory Inspection Dept. – Regards	Japan	Shingo Natsume	Madhouse	Traditional			February 14, 2020	47 minutes
Accidental Luxuriance of the Translucent Watery Rebus	Croatia	Dalibor Baric	Kaos	Multimedia			June 15, 2020 (Annecy)	81 minutes
A Costume for Nicholas; Un disfraz para Nicolás	Mexico	Eduardo Rivero	Fotosíntesis Media	Traditional; Flash animation			September 3, 2020	80 minutes
Alibaba and the Magic Lamp	China	Zhu Ge	Beijing Yingwo Culture Media Co Ltd.	CG animation			August 29, 2020	80 minutes
Alien Xmas	United States	Stephen Chiodo	Chiodo Brothers Productions; Golem Creations; Sonar Entertainment; Netflix	Stop-motion			November 20, 2020	42 minutes
Altered Carbon: Resleeved	Japan; United States	Takeru Nakajima; Yoshiyuki Okada	Studio Anima; Netflix	CG animation			March 19, 2020	74 minutes
Angela's Christmas Wish	Ireland	Damien O'Connor	Brown Bag Films	CG animation			December 1, 2020	47 minutes
A Shaun the Sheep Movie: Farmageddon	United Kingdom	Richard Phelan; Will Becher	Aardman Animations; StudioCanal	Stop motion			September 22, 2019 (Odeon Leicester Square); October 18, 2019 (United Kingdom); February 14, 2020 (United States)	87 minutes
Avera and the mystical Kingdom 2	China	Dai Chang Hao	Hefei Chuangxin Fuhao Entertainment Co Ltd.	Traditional			August 24, 2020	81 minutes
A Whisker Away	Japan	Junichi Sato; Tomotaka Shibayama	Studio Colorido	Traditional			June 18, 2020	104 minutes
Barbie: Princess Adventure	Canada	Conrad Helten	Mattel	CG animation			September 1, 2020	72 minutes
Barkers: Mind the Cats! Барбоскины на даче	Russia	Elena Galdobina; Fyodor Dmitriev	Melnitsa Animation Studio; CTB Film Company	CG animation			December 24, 2020	77 minutes
Battle of Pressburg hu:A pozsonyi csata	Hungary	Tamás Baltavári	Magyarságkutató Intézet	CG animation	TV movie		December 21, 2020 (M5 TV premiere)	52 minutes
Batman: Death in the Family	United States	Brandon Vietti	Warner Bros. Animation; DC Entertainment	Traditional			October 13, 2020	18–30 minutes 95 minutes (Digital)
Beauty Water	South Korea	Kyung-hun Cho	SS ANIMENT INC. Byungjin JEON; STUDIO ANIMA	Traditional			September 9, 2020	85 minutes
Berry and Dolly - Fairy Cards hu:Bogyó és Babóca 4 - Tündérkártyák	Hungary	Antonin Krizanics; Géza M. Tóth	Kedd Animation Studio	Flash animation			July 9, 2020 (Hungary premiere)	72 minutes
BEM: Become Human	Japan	Hiroshi Ikehata	Production I.G	Traditional			October 2, 2020	90 minutes
Ben 10 Versus the Universe: The Movie	United States	Man of Action	Cartoon Network Studios	Traditional			October 10, 2020	72 minutes
Bigfoot Family	Belgium; France	Ben Stassen	nWave Pictures; Octopolis; Charades	CG animation			August 5, 2020 (Belgium, France)	90 minutes
Bobbleheads: The Movie	United States	Kirk Wise	Universal Pictures Home Entertainment	CG animation			December 8, 2020	82 minutes
Burn the Witch	Japan	Tatsuro Kawano	Studio Colorido	Traditional			October 2, 2020	63 minutes
Calamity, a Childhood of Martha Jane Cannary	France; Denmark	Rémi Chayé	Maybe Movies	Traditional			June 28, 2020 (Lyon); August 30, 2020 (Angoulême Francophone Film Festival); October 14, 2020 (France)	85 minutes
Casa: Perros vs. Aliens	Spain	Bruno Vega	BrocoTree Animation	Stop-motion			October 2, 2020	73 minutes
China Panda	China	Fengcheng Wang	Changzhou David Brothers Entertainment Co Ltd.	Traditional			November 1, 2020	
Christmas at Cattle Hill; Jul på KuToppen	Norway	Will Ashurst	Qvisten Animation	CG animation			November 6, 2020	68 minutes
A Christmas Carol	United Kingdom	Jacqui Morris	Frith Street Films	CG animation Live action			November 20, 2020	95 minutes
Combat Wombat	Australia	Ricard Cussó	Like a Photon Creative	CG animation			October 11, 2020 (Brisbane International Film Festival); October 15, 2020 (Australia)	80 minutes
Conni - Secret of Mau the Cat	Germany	Ansgar Niebuhr	Youngfilms; Senator Film Produktion	CG animation			July 2, 2020	76 minutes
Cranston Academy: Monster Zone	Mexico; United Kingdom	Leopoldo Aguilar	Ánima Estudios; DNEG	CG animation			March 12, 2020 (Portugal); June 26, 2020 (Mexico); October 30, 2020 (United States)	80 minutes
Crayon Shin-chan: Crash! Rakuga Kingdom and Almost Four Heroes	Japan	Takahiko Kyōgoku	Shin-Ei Animation	Traditional			September 11, 2020	103 minutes
The Croods: A New Age	United States	Joel Crawford	Universal Pictures; DreamWorks Animation	CG animation			November 25, 2020	95 minutes
Curious George: Go West, Go Wild	United States	Michael LaBash	Peacock; Universal Pictures Home Entertainment; Universal Animation Studios; Imagine Entertainment	Flash animation			September 8, 2020	85 minutes
Daisy Quokka: World's Scariest Animal	Australia	Ricard Cussó	Like a Photon Creative	CG animation			November 28, 2020 (Children's International Film Festival); January 2021 (Australia)	89 minutes
Date A Bullet: Dead or Bullet	Japan	Jun Nakagawa	Geek Toys	Traditional			August 14, 2020	24 minutes
Date A Bullet: Nightmare or Queen	Japan	Jun Nakagawa	Geek Toys	Traditional			November 13, 2020	29 minutes
Demon Slayer: Kimetsu no Yaiba – The Movie: Mugen Train	Japan	Haruo Sotozak	Ufotable	Traditional			October 16, 2020	117 minutes
Digimon Adventure: Last Evolution Kizuna	Japan	Tomohisa Taguchi	Yumeta Company	Traditional			February 21, 2020	94 minutes
Deathstroke: Knights & Dragons: The Movie	United States	Sung Jin Ahn	Warner Bros. Animation; DC Entertainment	Traditional			August 4, 2020	87 minutes
Dragon Rider	Germany; Belgium	Tomer Eshed	Constantin Film	CG animation			October 1, 2020	92 minutes
Dreambuilders; Drømmebyggerne	Denmark	Kim Hagen Jensen	Sola Media	CG animation			February 6, 2020	81 minutes
Doraemon: Nobita's New Dinosaur	Japan	Kazuaki Imai	Toho	Traditional			August 7, 2020	111 minutes
Earwig and the Witch	Japan	Gorō Miyazaki	Studio Ghibli	CG animation			December 30, 2020 (NHK General TV); August 27, 2021 (Theatrical)	82 minutes
El Camino de Xico	Mexico	Eric Cabello	Ánima Estudios	Flash animation			November 12, 2020	86 minutes
Ella Bella Bingo; Elleville Elfrid	Norway	Atle Solberg Blakseth; Frank Mosvold	Gimpville AS; Kool Production AS	CG animation			January 24, 2020	75 minutes
Fate/Grand Order: Camelot – Wandering; Agaterám	Japan	Kei Suezawa	Signal.MD	Traditional			December 5, 2020	89 minutes
Fate/stay night: Heaven's Feel III. spring song	Japan	Tomonori Sudō	Ufotable	Traditional			August 15, 2020	122 minutes
Fearless	Canada; United States	Cory Edwards	Vanguard Animation; 3QU Media; Netflix	CG animation			August 14, 2020	89 minutes
Ginger's Tale	Russia	Konstantin Shchekin	Vverh Animation Studio	Traditional			June 15, 2020 (Annecy); February 4, 2021 (Russia)	92 minutes
Given	Japan	Hikaru Yamaguchib	Lerche	Traditional			August 22, 2020	59 minutes
Goblin Slayer: Goblin's Crown	Japan	Takaharu Ozaki	White Fox	Traditional			February 1, 2020	85 minutes
Guangyu, God of War	China	Zhizhong Cai	Beijing Weifeng Media Co Ltd.	CG animation			January 11, 2020	87 minutes
Grisaia: Phantom Trigger the Animation Stargazer	Japan	Tensho	Bibury Animation Studios	Traditional			November 27, 2020	60 minutes
Happy-Go-Lucky Days	Japan	Takuya Satō	Liden Films Kyoto Studio	Traditional			October 23, 2020	54 minutes
Happy Halloween, Scooby Doo!	United States	Maxwell Atoms	Warner Bros. Animation; Hanna-Barbera	Traditional			October 6, 2020	80 minutes
"Hataraku Saibō!!" Saikyō no Teki, Futatabi. Karada no Naka wa "Chō" Ōsawagi!	Japan	Hirofumi Ogura	David Production	Traditional			September 5, 2020	115 minutes
The Hero Battle	China	Lu Dexinag	Shenzhen GDC Entertainment Co Ltd.	CG animation			January 17, 2020	
High School Fleet: The Movie	Japan	Yuu Nobuta; Jun Nakagawa	A-1 Pictures	Traditional			January 18, 2020	105 minutes
Homeward	United States	Michael Johnson	The Asylum	CG animation			February 25, 2020 (Internet); February 28, 2020 (United States)	81 minutes
Horse Julius and Big Horse Racing	Russia	Darina Schmidt; Konstantin Feoktistov	Melnitsa Animation Studio; CTB Film Company	Traditional			December 31, 2020	77 minutes
The Island of Giant Insects	Japan	Takeo Takahashi	Passione	Traditional			January 10, 2020	76 minutes
Jiang Ziya: Legend Of Deification	China	Cheng Teng; Li Wei	Beijing Enlight Pictures	CG animation			October 1, 2020	110 minutes
Josee, the Tiger and the Fish	Japan	Kotaro Tamura	Bones	Traditional			October 30, 2020 (Busan); December 25, 2020 (Japan)	98 minutes
Josep	France; Belgium; Spain	Aurel	Les Films d’Ici Méditerranée; Les Films du Poisson Rouge; In Effecto; Tchack; Les Films d’Ici; Lunanime; Promenons-nous dans les bois	Traditional			September 30, 2020	74 minutes
Jumper. Treasure Hunting 3D; Прыг Скок в поисках сокровищ	Russia; Kazakhstan	Arman Beisembayev	Cinema Tone Production; Media Base	CG animation			September 17, 2020	72 minutes
Jungle Beat: The Movie	Mauritius; South Africa; United Kingdom	Brent Dawes	Sunrise Productions; Sandcastle Studios	CG animation			June 15, 2020 (Annecy); May 14, 2021 (Netflix)	87 minutes
Justice League Dark: Apokolips War	United States	Matt Peters; Christina Sotta	Warner Bros. Animation; DC Entertainment	Traditional			May 5, 2020 (Digital download)	90 minutes
The Juvenile of King Yu	China	Jinbao Li	Hefei diffuse Film Co Ltd.	Traditional			August 21, 2020	90 minutes
Kill It and Leave This Town	Poland	Mariusz Wilczynski	Bombonierka	Traditional			February 22, 2020 (Berlin); March 5, 2021	88 minutes
Kimi wa Kanata	Japan	Yoshinobu Sena	Digital Network Animation	Traditional			November 11, 2020 (Ikebukuro); November 27, 2020 (Japan)	95 minutes
The Knight and the Princess	Egypt	Bashir el-Deek	Alsahar Animation	Traditional			September 19, 2019 (El Gouna Film Festival); January 29, 2020 (Cairo)	97 minutes
Kung Fu Mulan	China	Guanghua Liao	Guangzhou Jinchuan Media Co Ltd.	CG animation			October 3, 2020	100 minutes
Kud Wafter	Japan	Yoshinobu Yamakawa	J.C. Staff	Traditional			November 28, 2020	50 minutes
Lady Buckit and the Motley Mopsters	Nigeria	Adebisi Adetayo	Hot Ticket Productions	CG animation	First Nigerian animated feature.		December 11, 2020	80 minutes
La liga de los 5	Mexico	Marvick Núñez	Ánima Estudios	Flash animation			January 10, 2020	89 minutes
The Larva Island Movie	South Korea	Byoung-Wook Ahn	TUBA Entertainment	CG animation			July 23, 2020	89 minutes
L'étranger de la Plage	Japan	Akiyo Ohashi	Studio Hibari	Traditional			September 11, 2020	59 minutes
Lego DC Shazam! Magic and Monsters	United States	Matt Peters	Warner Bros. Animation; DC Entertainment; The Lego Group	CG animation			April 28, 2020 (Digital); June 16, 2020 (DVD and Blu-ray)	81 minutes
Looking for Magical Doremi	Japan	Junichi Sato	Toei Animation	Traditional			November 3, 2020 (TIFF); November 13, 2020	91 minutes
Love Me, Love Me Not	Japan	Toshimasa Kuroyanagi	A-1 Pictures	Traditional			September 18, 2020	103 minutes
Lur eta Amets; Lur y Amets	Spain	Joseba Ponce; Imanol Zinkunegi	Atera Films; LA Ekoizpenak	Flash animation			February 7, 2020	87 minutes
Made in Abyss: Dawn of the Deep Soul	Japan	Masayuki Kojima	Kinema Citrus	Traditional			January 17, 2020	105 minutes
Magic Arch 3D; Полное погружение	Russia	Vasiliy Rovenskiy	Licensing Brands; Cinema Fund	CG animation			December 3, 2020	83 minutes
The Magnificent Kotobuki Complete Edition	Japan	Tsutomu Mizushima	GEMBA	Traditional			September 11, 2020	119 minutes
Marudase Kintarō	Japan	Hideki Araki	Seven	Traditional			December 9, 2020	9 minutes
Masameer: The Movie	Saudi Arabia	Malik Nejer	Myrkott Animation Studio	Flash animation			January 9, 2020	110 minutes
Mr.Miao	China	Lingxiao Li	Gudong animation studio	Traditional			July 31, 2020	89 minutes
Monster Strike The Movie: Lucifer Zetsubō no Yoake	Japan	Kobun Shizuno	Anima; Dynamo Pictures	Traditional			November 6, 2020	127 minutes
Mortal Kombat Legends: Scorpion's Revenge	United States	Ethan Spaulding	Warner Bros. Animation; NetherRealm Studios	Traditional			April 14, 2020	80 minutes
My Favorite War	Norway; Latvia	Ilze Burkovska Jacobsen	Bivrost Film; Ego Media	Flash animation			June 15, 2020 (Annecy); August 26, 2020 (Norwegian International Film Festival); September 25, 2020	80 minutes
Nahuel and the Magic Book; Nahuel y el Libro Mágico	Chile; Brazil	Germán Acuña	Coproducción Chile-Brasil; Carburadores; Punkrobot; Red Animation Studios; Levante Films; Dragao Studios; Gecko Animacion; Draftoons Studios; Thumbs Multimedia; 315 Estudios; Stoon; Zentanauta; Cabong Studios; Intervalo; Animator; DL Assessoria Contrabil; L+Z; Fratem; LMS Studio Latido Films	Traditional			June 15, 2020 (Annecy); April 9, 2021 (SIFF); January 20, 2022 (Chile)	99 minutes
The Nose or the Conspiracy of Mavericks	Russia	Andrey Khrzhanovsky	School-Studio "Shar"	Traditional			January 27, 2020 (IFFR); March 11, 2021 (Russia)	89 minutes
Norm of the North: Family Vacation	United States; India	Anthony Bell	Assemblage Entertainment; Dream Factory Group; Splash Entertainment	CG animation			February 25, 2020	90 minutes
Octonauts & the Caves of Sac Actun	United Kingdom; Canada	Blair Simmons	Silvergate Media; Mainframe Studios	CG animation			August 14, 2020	72 minutes
Octonauts & the Great Barrier Reef	United Kingdom; Canada	Blair Simmons	Silvergate Media; Mainframe Studios	CG animation			October 13, 2020	47 minutes
Onward	United States	Dan Scanlon	Disney; Pixar Animation Studios	CG animation			February 21, 2020 (Berlinale); March 6, 2020 (United States)	102 minutes
The Orbit of Minor Satellites	United States	Chris Sullivan	Chris Sullivan Animation	Traditional				
Oresuki: Game Over	Japan	Noriaki Akitaya	Connect	Traditional			September 2, 2020	70 minutes
The Old Man and Two Mountains	China	Zhihong Chen; Marc Handler	Toonmax Media Co Ltd.	Traditional			September 9, 2020	
Over the Moon	United States; China	Glen Keane; John Kahrs	Netflix; Pearl Studio	CG animation			October 17, 2020 (MFF); October 23, 2020 (United States)	100 minutes
Pat & Mat	China	Le Yang; Chang Shu	Beijing national shadow Film Publishing Co., Ltd	Stop-motion			July 31, 2020	
Little Vampire; Petit Vampire	France; Belgium	Joann Sfar	Autochenille Production	Traditional			October 21, 2020	82 minutes
Phineas and Ferb the Movie: Candace Against the Universe	United States	Bob Bowen	Disney; Disney Television Animation; Disney+	Traditional			August 27, 2020 (D23 Gold Member Advance Screening); August 28, 2020 (United States and Canada)	85 minutes
Pinkfong & Baby Shark's Space Adventure	South Korea; United States; Malaysia	Byeon Hee-sun; Jinyoung Jung; Nayoon Kim	CJ Entertainment; Pinkfong; SmartStudy	CG animation			December 12, 2019 (Singapore); January 30, 2020 (South Korea); January 15, 2021 (Netflix); October 9/10, 2021 (United States); December 22, 2021 (YouTube); December 25, 2021 (EBC Yoyo)	65 minutes
Pokémon the Movie: Secrets of the Jungle	Japan	Tetsuo Yajima	OLM	Traditional			December 25, 2020	100 minutes
Pretty Cure Miracle Leap: A Wonderful Day with Everyone	Japan	Fukuzawa Toshinori	Toei Animation	Traditional			October 31, 2020	70 minutes
Poupelle of Chimney Town	Japan	Yusuke Hirota	Studio 4°C	CG animation Traditional			December 25, 2020	101 minutes
Psycho-Pass 3: First Inspector	Japan	Naoyoshi Shiotani	Production I.G	Traditional			March 27, 2020	137 minutes
Punyakoti	India	Ravishankar Venkateswaran	Puppetica Media	Flash animation			March 25, 2020	85 minutes
Raggie; Sipsik	Estonia; Denmark	Meelis Arulepp; Karsten Kiilerich	A. Film Production; Copenhagen Bombay	CG animation			February 19, 2020	74 minutes
The Red Scroll; O Pergaminho Vermelho	Brazil	Nelson Botter Jr.	Tortuga Studios; Vitrine Filmes	Flash animation			October 22, 2020 (São Paulo International Film Festival); December 11, 2020 (Brazil)	90 minutes
Revue Starlight Rondo Rondo Rondo	Japan	Tomohiro Furukawa	Kinema Citrus	Traditional			August 7, 2020	119 minutes
Saezuru Tori wa Habatakanai – The Clouds Gather	Japan	Kaori Makita	GRIZZLY	Traditional			February 15, 2020	85 minutes
Salute to the Heroes	China	Jianping Li; Xiangnong Chen; Cheng He; Xia Han	China Film Animation Co Ltd. Huaxia Film Distribution Co Ltd.	CG animation			October 23, 2020	
Scoob!	United States	Tony Cervone	Warner Bros. Warner Animation Group; Hanna-Barbera	CG animation			May 15, 2020	94 minutes
Sekai-ichi Hatsukoi: Propose-hen	Japan	Tomoya Takahashi	Studio Deen	Traditional			February 21, 2020	21 minutes
Sheep and Wolves: Pig Deal	Russia	Vladimir Nikolaev; Mikhail Babenko	Wizart Animation	CG animation			January 24, 2019 (Russia); August 10, 2020 (United Kingdom); January 29, 2021 (United States)	85 minutes
Shirobako: The Movie	Japan	Tsutomu Mizushima	P.A. Works	Traditional			February 29, 2020	119 minutes
Son of Dragon God	China	Fei Rui Hua	Guangdong Tianying International Film Co Ltd.	Traditional			October 24, 2020	
Sonic the Hedgehog	United States; Japan; Canada	Jeff Fowler	Paramount Pictures; Original Film; Sega; Blur Studio; Maria Animation Planet	CG animation Live-action			January 25, 2020 (Paramount Pictures lot); February 14, 2020 (United States); June 26, 2020 (Japan)	99 minutes
Soul	United States	Pete Docter	Disney; Pixar Animation Studios	CG animation			October 11, 2020 (BFI Fest); December 25, 2020 (United States); January 12, 2024 (United States; theatrical)	100 minutes
Space Dogs: Return to Earth	Russia	Inna Evlannikova	KinoAtis; Gorky Film Studios	CG animation			September 24, 2020	80 minutes
The SpongeBob Movie: Sponge on the Run	United States	Tim Hill	Paramount Pictures; Paramount Animation; Nickelodeon Movies; Mikros Image; United Plankton Pictures	CG animation Live-action			August 14, 2020 (Canada); March 4, 2021 (United States)	91 minutes
Spycies	China; France	Guillaume Ivernel; Zhiyi Zhang	Lux Populi VFX iQIYI Motion Pictures	CG animation			June 14, 2019 (Annecy); January 11, 2020	99 minutes
Stand by Me Doraemon 2	Japan	Ryūichi Yagi; Takashi Yamazaki	Shin-Ei Animation; Shirogumi; Robot Communications	CG animation			November 20, 2020	96 minutes
Superman: Man of Tomorrow	United States	Chris Palmer	Warner Bros. Animation; DC Entertainment	Traditional			August 23, 2020 Digital	86 minutes
Superman: Red Son	United States	Sam Liu	Warner Bros. Animation; DC Entertainment	Traditional			February 25, 2020	84 minutes
The Swan Princess: A Royal Wedding	United States	Richard Rich	Assemblage Entertainment; Sony Wonder	CG animation			August 4, 2020	83 minutes
Titus: Mystery of The Enygma	Indonesia	Dineshkumar Subashchandra	MNC Animation	CG animation			January 9, 2020	95 minutes
Trash	Italy	Francesco Dafano; Luca della Grotta	Al One S.r.l.	CG animation			October 16, 2020	88 minutes
Trolls World Tour	United States	Walt Dohrn; David P. Smith	Universal Pictures; DreamWorks Animation	CG animation			April 10, 2020	91 minutes
True North	Indonesia; Japan	Eiji Han Shimizu	Studio Raboon; Sumimasen Pte. Ltd.	CG animation			June 15, 2020 (Annecy); June 4, 2021 (Japan)	94 minutes
Trump vs the Illuminati	United States	BC Fourteen	Ruthless Studios	CG animation			October 6, 2020	70 minutes
Two Buddies and a Badger: The Great Big Beast	Norway	Gunhild Enger; Rune Spaans	Tordenfilm AS; Qvisten Animation; Headspin; Storyline Studios; Starcom; Zefyr Media Fund	CG animation			September 25, 2020 (Norway)	78 minutes
Victor Robot	Ukraine	Anatoliy Lavrenishyn	Arthouse Traffic	Traditional			September 26, 2020 (Odesa International Film Festival); June 24, 2021 (Ukraine)	75 minutes
Violet Evergarden: The Movie	Japan	Taichi Ishidate	Kyoto Animation	Traditional			September 18, 2020	140 minutes
Wave!!: Let's Go Surfing!!	Japan	Takaharu Ozaki	Asahi Production	Traditional			October 2, 2020	
Wave!!: Let's Go Surfing!! Part 2	Japan	Takaharu Ozaki	Asahi Production	Traditional			October 16, 2020	
Wave!!: Let's Go Surfing!! Part 3	Japan	Takaharu Ozaki	Asahi Production	Traditional			October 30, 2020	
Weathering with You; Tenki no Ko	Japan	Makoto Shinkai	CoMix Wave Films	Traditional			July 19, 2019 (Japan); January 15, 2020 (United States)	112 minutes
We Bare Bears: The Movie	United States	Daniel Chong	Cartoon Network Studios	Traditional			June 30, 2020 (digital); September 7, 2020 (TV)	70 minutes
The Willoughbys	Canada; United States	Kris Pearn; Cory Evans	Netflix; Bron Animation	CG animation			April 22, 2020	92 minutes
The Wishmas Tree	Australia	Ricard Cussó	Like a Photon Creative	CG animation			October 5, 2019 (Brisbane International Film Festival); February 27, 2020 (Australia)	90 minutes
Wolfwalkers	Ireland; United States; Luxembourg; France	Tomm Moore; Ross Stewart	Apple TV+ Cartoon Saloon; Melusine Productions; Dentsu Entertainment USA	Traditional			September 12, 2020 (TIFF); December 2, 2020 (Ireland); December 11, 2020 (Apple TV+); December 16, 2020 (France)	103 minutes
The Wonderland	Japan	Keiichi Hara	Fuji TV; Dentsu; Aniplex	Traditional			April 26, 2019 (Japan); January 20, 2020 (United States)	115 minutes
Words Bubble Up Like Soda Pop; Cider no Yō ni Kotoba ga Wakiagaru	Japan	Kyōhei Ishiguro	Signal.MD; Sublimation	Traditional			July 25, 2020 (Shanghai International Film Festival); July 22, 2021 (Worldwide)	87 minutes
Yakari, A Spectacular Journey	France; Belgium; Germany	Xavier Giacometti	Belvision Studios; Dargaud Media	CG animation			August 12, 2020 (France)	83 minutes
Yes, No, or Maybe?	Japan	Masahiro Takata	Lesprit	Traditional			December 11, 2020	53 minutes
You Animal!	Philippines	Avid Liongoren	Rocketsheep Studio; Spring Films	Flash animation			October 29, 2020	73 minutes

== Highest-grossing animated films ==
The following is a list of the 10 highest-grossing animated feature films first released in 2020.

Rank	Title	Distributor	Worldwide gross	Ref
1	Demon Slayer: Kimetsu no Yaiba – The Movie: Mugen Train	Toho / Aniplex	$512,704,063	
2	Jiang Ziya: Legend Of Deification	Beijing Enlight Pictures	$243,883,429	
3	The Croods: A New Age	Universal Pictures	$215,905,815	
4	Onward	Walt Disney Pictures	$141,940,042	
5	Soul	Walt Disney Pictures	$120,957,731	
6	Stand by Me Doraemon 2	Toho Company	$65,201,374	
7	Trolls World Tour	Universal Pictures	$53,146,787	(Note: Trolls World Tour Gross: International – $48,846,787; United States – $4,300,000)
8	Doraemon: Nobita's New Dinosaur	Toho Company	$33,942,341	
9	Scoob!	Warner Bros. Pictures	$27,088,425	
10	Digimon Adventure: Last Evolution Kizuna	Toei Company	$24,800,027	

The year was severely impacted by the COVID-19 pandemic which led to a major decline in box office revenue due to the closure of cinemas and movie theaters. For the first time in box office history, two non-American animated film productions (Asian films), Demon Slayer: Mugen Train from Japan and Jiang Ziya from China, have become the highest-grossing animated films of the year. It is also the first time since 1987 that a non-American animated film (Japanese anime), Demon Slayer: Mugen Train, became the highest-grossing animated film of the year, and the first time an anime has made the top 10 highest-grossing films of the year worldwide.

2020 was also the first year since 2014 to not have an animated film gross $700, $800, $900 million and $1 billion, the first year since 2005 to not have an animated film gross $600 million.

The doraemon series decked out among the top 10 after 13 years. Demon Slayer: Kimetsu no Yaiba the Movie: Mugen Train, It set the all-time box office records for the highest-grossing Japanese film, the highest-grossing anime film, and the highest-grossing R-rated animated film. In Japan, Mugen Train set the first-day opening record with ¥1.2 billion ($11.3 million), before breaking the opening weekend record with ¥4.6 billion ($43.8 million) over three days. It went on to have the highest-grossing second weekend, and in ten days became the fastest film to cross ¥10 billion ($96.7 million), surpassing Spirited Away (2001) which had previously crossed the ¥10 billion milestone in 19 days and held the record for 19 years. Mugen Train also became the fastest film to cross ¥20 billion in Japan, again faster than Spirited Away. It also set the record for the highest-grossing IMAX release in Japan, surpassing the previous record holder Bohemian Rhapsody (2018). In 59 days, Mugen Train set another record as the fastest film to cross the ¥30 billion milestone, faster than Spirited Away which took 253 days to reach the same milestone. In 66 days, the film set another record as the first film to top the Japanese box office charts for ten straight weekends (since the charts began publication in 2004). In 73 days, Mugen Train grossed ¥32.48 billion to become the highest-grossing film of all time in Japan, surpassing Spirited Away which held the record for 19 years.

== See also ==
- List of animated television series of 2020
