= The Tales from Sanctuary City =

Australian media franchise

- Created by: Kristen Souvlis; Nadine Bates
- Original work: The Wishmas Tree (2020)
- Owner: Like a Photon Creative
- Years: 2020–present

Films and television
- Film(s): Original films: The Wishmas Tree (2020); Daisy Quokka: World's Scariest Animal (2021); The Sloth Lane (2024); The Lost Tiger (2025); Combat Wombat films: Combat Wombat (2020); Combat Wombat: Back 2 Back (2024)

Games
- Video game(s): Sanctuary World (2020)

The Tales from Sanctuary City is a media franchise created and managed by Australian children's production company Like a Photon Creative founders Kristen Souvlis and Nadine Bates.

== Description ==
The franchise revolves around the anthropomorphic animals who reside in Sanctuary City, which was inspired by the fauna and landscape of Australia. As of 2025, the franchise consists of six overall feature films and a mobile game titled Sanctuary World, which was discontinued in 2020 shortly after its release.

The first three films were directed by Ricard Cussó, with the fourth by Cussó and Tania Vincent. The fifth film was written and directed by Tania Vincent, making her the first woman in Australia to write and direct an animated feature. The sixth film, The Lost Tiger (2025), was directed, co-written, and co-produced by indigenous filmmaker Chantelle Murray.

The first film was distributed by R & R Films, and the next two were distributed by Odin's Eye Entertainment, but as of 2025, the company's films were distributed by Maslow Entertainment. The first film received generally negative reviews from critics, and the following three received mixed to positive reviews.

== Films ==
Film	Release date (Australia)	Director(s)	Writer(s)	Story by	Producer(s)
The Wishmas Tree	27 February 2020	Ricard Cussó	Peter Ivan & Ryan Greaves	Peter Ivan	Nadine Bates and Kristen Souvlis
Combat Wombat	15 October 2020	Ricard Cussó	Matthew James Kinmonth	Matthew James Kinmonth	Nadine Bates and Kristen Souvlis
Daisy Quokka: World's Scariest Animal	4 February 2021	Ricard Cussó	Ryan Greaves	Ryan Greaves	Nadine Bates and Kristen Souvlis
Combat Wombat: Back 2 Back	29 February 2024	Ricard Cussó and Tania Vincent	Dominic Morris	Dominic Morris	Nadine Bates and Kristen Souvlis
The Sloth Lane	25 July 2024	Tania Vincent	Tania Vincent, Ryan Greaves	Tania Vincent, Ryan Greaves	Nadine Bates, Ryan Greaves, and Kristen Souvlis
The Lost Tiger	27 February 2025	Chantelle Murray	Chantelle Murray and Philip Denson	Chantelle Murray and Philip Denson	Nadine Bates, Ryan Greaves, and Kristen Souvlis

Like a Photon Creative launched the franchise with feature films, starting with The Wishmas Tree in 2020. They were backed and funded by Screen Queensland and Screen Australia.

=== The Wishmas Tree (2020) ===
A young possum's misguided wish for a white Wishmas unintentionally freezes her entire hometown of Sanctuary City and threatens the lives of all who live there. Before the magical Wishmas Tree dies, she must undertake a journey into The Wild in order to reverse the damage she caused and save the city.

The film was in development during 2018 and 2019. It had its world premiere at the Brisbane International Film Festival on 5 October 2019, and was released in Australian theatres on 27 February 2020.

=== Combat Wombat (2020) ===
Lazy wombat Maggie Diggins becomes Combat Wombat, Sanctuary City's new superhero after she begrudgingly saves a citizen from falling to his death, but her rising stardom displeases local superhero Flightless Feather, who hatches a plan for Maggie's demise. Maggie uncovers a conspiracy that could put the city in grave danger, and it is up to her to expose it.

Combat Wombat was released in Australian theatres on 15 October 2020. It had a limited release to 42 screens.

=== Daisy Quokka: World's Scariest Animal (2021) ===
The optimistic Quokka named Daisy dreams of winning the World's Scariest Animal competition of Sanctuary City.

The film had its world premiere at the Children's International Film Festival (CHIFF) in Australia on 28 November 2020, and opened in theatres with a limited release in Australia on 4 February 2021 due to the impact of the COVID-19 pandemic on cinemas. The film received generally mixed to positive reviews from critics.

=== Combat Wombat: Back 2 Back (2024) ===
A sequel to the 2020 original, titled Combat Wombat: Back 2 Back, was released in Australian theatres on 29 February 2024. In the film, Maggie Diggins is once again in the role of Combat Wombat when an evil tech genius threatens to turn the city into a metaverse simulation.

=== The Sloth Lane (2024) ===
Laura Romero and her family of Mexican sloths move to Sanctuary City after their family restaurant is destroyed by the storm. Their food truck soon becomes a hit in the town, which attracts a business entrepreneur Dotti Pace, who wants to save own failed fast food chain by stealing their family recipe book and expand a food business.

The film had its world premiere at the Annecy Animation Film Festival in France on 10 June 2024, and opened in theatres in Australia on 25 July.

=== The Lost Tiger (2025) ===
Teo, one of the last thylacines ("Tasmanian tigers"), who is taken by a family of kangaroos, embarks on an adventure to save his homeland from being destroyed.

The Lost Tiger premiered at the Brisbane International Film Festival on 26 October 2024, followed by Australian theatres on 27 February 2025.

== Cast and characters ==
List indicator

This section includes characters who will appear or have appeared in more than two films in the series.

- An empty grey cell indicates the character was not in the film, or that the character's official presence has not yet been confirmed.

Characters	Original films				Combat Wombat films	
Characters	The Wishmas Tree	Daisy Quokka: World's Scariest Animal	The Sloth Lane	The Lost Tiger	Combat Wombat	Back 2 Back
Kerry	Miranda Tapsell					
Yarra	Ross Noble					
Daisy Quokka		Angourie Rice				
Frankie Scales		Sam Neill				
Mum Quokka		Lucy Durack				
Dad Quokka		Grant Denyer				
Laura Romero			Teo Vergara			
Gabriella Romero Flores			Olivia Vásquez			
Luis Romero			Ben Gorroño			
Mani Romero			Facundo Herrera			
Dotti Pace			Leslie Jones			
Teo				Thomas Weatherall		
Plato				Rhys Darby		
Quinella				Celeste Barber		
Red				Jimi Bani		
Kara				Nakkiah Lui		
Maggie Diggins / Combat Wombat					Deborah Mailman	Deborah Mailman
Sweetie					Ed Oxenbould	Ed Oxenbould
Flightless Feather		Frank Woodley			Frank Woodley	
PR manager CeCe					Judith Lucy	
Lenny Glick						David Wenham

== Reception ==
=== Box office performance ===
Film	Release date (Australia)	Box office gross
The Wishmas Tree	27 February 2020	$1,793,562
Combat Wombat	15 October 2020	$619,958
Daisy Quokka: World's Scariest Animal	4 February 2021	$384,753
Combat Wombat: Back 2 Back	29 February 2024	$935,534
The Sloth Lane	25 July 2024	$1,345,805
The Lost Tiger	27 February 2025	$498,277

=== Critical reception ===
Film	Rotten Tomatoes
The Wishmas Tree	50% (6 reviews)
The Sloth Lane	71% (17 reviews)
