= Combat Wombat: Back 2 Back =

2024 Australian animated superhero film

- Theatrical release poster
- Directed by: Ricard Cussó; Tania Vincent
- Written by: Dominic Morris
- Produced by: Kristen Souvlis; Nadine Bates; Ryan Greaves
- Starring: Deborah Mailman; Ed Oxenbould; David Wenham; Elizabeth Cullen; Mark Coles Smith; Riley Von Husen
- Edited by: Michelle McGilvray; Josef Switak
- Music by: Ack Kinmonth
- Production company: Like a Photon Creative
- Distributed by: Sola Media (international sales); Universal Pictures (international); Maslow Entertainment (Australia)
- Release dates: 28 October 2023 (Brisbane International Film Festival); 29 February 2024 (Australia)
- Running time: 80 minutes
- Country: Australia
- Language: English

Combat Wombat: Back 2 Back (Combat Wombat: Double Trouble in the UK) is a 2023 Australian animated superhero film directed by Richard Cussó and Tania Vincent, and written by Dominic Morris. The film is a sequel to Combat Wombat and the fourth film in Like a Photon Creative's The Tales from Sanctuary City franchise. The film addresses the topics of mind control and virtual reality.

== Plot ==
Maggie Diggins is once again in the role of Combat Wombat when an evil tech genius threatens to turn Sanctuary City into a metaverse simulation.

== Voice cast ==
- Deborah Mailman as Maggie Diggins / Combat Wombat, a lazy female wombat who turns into a superhero at night.
- Ed Oxenbould as Sweetie, a sugar glider
- David Wenham as Lenny Glick, a villainous chameleon scientist who wants to control all animals through a device that makes them enter a virtual world where their wishes are fulfilled but where they abandon their freedom and power.
- Elizabeth Cullen as Skylar, a teenage chameleon delinquent
- Mark Coles Smith as Reginald, an elderly echidna
- Dan Brumm as Chief Furbank, an elderly dingo
- Grant Denyer as Grant Quokka, a quokka with a moustache who works as a news reporter
- Riley Von Husen as Bradley Burrows, a raccoon bandit

== Release ==
Combat Wombat: Back 2 Back has worldwide sales by the Stuttgart-based company Sola Media. The film premiered at the Brisbane International Film Festival in 2023 but was only theatrically released in Australia on 29 February 2024 with distribution by Maslow Entertainment. The film is distributed internationally by Universal Pictures.

== Reception ==
Combat Wombat: Back 2 Back received mixed to negative reviews from critics. Cath Clarke of The Guardian wrote that it was "an overly fast animation about a chameleon taking over the world with computer wizardry feels bizarrely inappropriate for children under five". James Croot, writing for The Post, gave the film a negative review, noting that it "suffers from a severe case of sequelitis". The Canberra Times' reviewer gave the film two stars and felt that whilst the film was "colourful and keeps moving" it was "loud and heavy handed".
