= Daisy Quokka: World's Scariest Animal =

- Theatrical release poster
- Directed by: Ricard Cussó
- Written by: Ryan Greaves
- Produced by: Kristen Souvlis; Nadine Bates
- Starring: Angourie Rice; Sharnee Tones; Sam Neill
- Edited by: Michelle McGilvray
- Music by: Ack Kinmonth
- Production company: Like a Photon Creative
- Distributed by: Odin's Eye Entertainment
- Release dates: 28 November 2020 (Children's International Film Festival); 4 February 2021 (Australia)
- Running time: 89 minutes
- Country: Australia
- Language: English
- Box office: $174,186

Daisy Quokka: World's Scariest Animal is a 2020 Australian animated comedy film directed by Ricard Cussó and written by Ryan Greaves. Financed by Screen Queensland and Screen Australia, it is the third film in Like a Photon Creative's The Tales from Sanctuary City franchise. The plot concerns the unbearably adorable but optimistic quokka named Daisy who has the impossible dream of winning the city's World's Scariest Animal competition. The film opened with a limited release in Australia on 4 February 2021 due to the impact of the COVID-19 pandemic on cinemas and on October 29 in the United States.

== Plot ==
Long ago on Quokka Rocks, a peaceful tropical island ten kilometers off the coast of Sanctuary City, tourists discovered the quokkas. People found their iconic smile so adorable that soon everyone wanted to take selfies with them and quokkas quickly became very popular for being the "Cutest Animal". Many years later, quokkas have evolved and now work as attractions on Quokka Rocks, which has now become a famous tourist destination, where all of the tourists come to take pictures with the quokkas. Daisy, a highly optimistic quokka has grown tired of the same old routine of taking pictures with the tourists and wants to achieve the impossible – to win the annual "World's Scariest Games" where animals from around the world compete for the "World's Scariest Animal" championship, just like her childhood hero, the legendary five-time WSG champion Frankie Scales the crocodile, and often follows his motto, "Never give up on your dreams". When Daisy tries to explain her dream to her parents, who own the tourism industry on the island, they believe Daisy's dream to be a bad idea, as quokkas are meant to be cute and cuddly, not fierce and scary. Instead, her parents want Daisy to become the new face of Quokka Rocks.

At her parents' behest, Daisy boards the ferry to Sanctuary City to go out and take photos with everyone to promote tourism. When she arrives in the city, after dragging her stand up a steep hill, Daisy makes it to the WSG arena, where she finds out that qualifying rounds are beginning the next day to find two athletes to compete in the games. Daisy also meets Ronda Saltie, a female crocodile who is also the top athlete for the WSG tournament, but Ronda is mean to Daisy and also scoffs at the notion of a quokka competing in the WSG, and tells Daisy that the only way she can try out for the games is if she can find a coach willing to teach her.

That night, after taking selfies with people all day, Daisy finds her stand stolen by a pack of drop bears, who chase her into the wilderness, where she meets a grouchy old crocodile Frankie Scales, now a washed up, forgotten recluse. Back when he was in his prime, Frankie's downfall came the day of the Fire Isles Finale, the final part of the WSG game in which the two finalists had to climb to the top of a large mountain. Frankie was competing against his longtime rival, a kangaroo named Jerry Whiskers. When Jerry tried to edge him out, Frankie panicked and accidentally smacked Jerry with his tail, sending Jerry falling off the cliff and being badly injured, resulting in Jerry being unable to ever walk again. In the aftermath, Frankie was shunned by the city who believed that he had cheated and deliberately injured Jerry. Frankie's achievements were forgotten, and Frankie felt betrayed by the city that once loved him, as well as feeling guilty for what he did to Jerry. He left, vowing to never return to the city again, abandoning his wife and daughter. Frankie Scales disappeared, never to be seen again.

Upon meeting Daisy, Frankie is initially reluctant to help her, but after being told by Daisy about Ronda, Frankie agrees to help her after all. The next day at the tryouts, Frankie once again meets up with Jerry Whiskers, who now uses a wheelchair since his accident. Jerry still holds a grudge against Frankie for what happened, and he is also revealed to be Ronda's coach. Upon finding out that Daisy is the athlete Frankie is coaching, Jerry believes that she doesn't have a chance. In order to qualify, the contestants must conquer a complex and dangerous obstacle course and hit the buzzer at the end. Only the top two fastest athletes will be able to make it to the games. Most of the participants fail the course, but Ronda, Daisy, and a third contestant, a cockatoo named Dex Brown complete it. Daisy is initially turned down because she took so long to complete the course, but the WSG president Augustus Maximus points out that Dex cannot be the second member of the team because he technically failed to complete the course because he did not press the buzzer. Because of this, Daisy is able to compete.

On the day of the games, the contestants consist of Daisy and Ronda, representing Sanctuary City; Tyrus Polar, a polar bear representing New Winterland; Adewale Khan, an African lion representing Savannah Kingdom; and the new current four-time WSG champion, Drago Modo, a Komodo dragon representing Fire Isle, respectively. During the first challenge the "First Wish", Daisy lags behind badly, forcing Ronda to give up her lead and go back to help her, causing them to lose the first round to Drago, putting them in last place. Ronda angrily chastises Daisy later on. Daisy begins to lose hope in achieving her dreams and later gets a call from her parents, who try to convince her to return home, but she is later found practicing at a playground by Frankie, who says that Daisy reminds him of himself as a child. Daisy admits that she is more afraid of returning home than returning to the games. She explains to Frankie that she does not want to go back to her old life where she was doing a job that was forcing her to be someone else just because of her appearance on the outside rather than who she is on the inside. Daisy is also scared of going through life believing that her dreams passed her by and that she did not even try. Frankie then teaches Daisy to push through her fears and tells Daisy that in order to compete better, she just needs to be herself. Frankie also helps her to train and become stronger.

As a result, Daisy performs much better in the next rounds of the tournament, putting her team in second place and winning the respect of Ronda and Jerry. That night, Daisy notices that Frankie is thinking about Ronda, and realizes that Ronda is Frankie's daughter. After his big loss, Frankie felt that he could not bear to face his family, believing that the WSG games were the only thing he was good at. When that was gone, Frankie felt lost, not wanting his own daughter to hate him like everyone else did, but when he met Daisy, Frankie thought it would give him a chance to see Ronda again. Daisy encourages Frankie to talk to her, telling him that he just needs to show Ronda that he still cares and loves her. Unbeknownst to them, Ronda overheard their conversation.

On the day of the final challenge, Daisy is facing off against Drago. Daisy almost wins, but Drago purposely sets fire to the course in an attempt to stop her. The audience panics as they try to escape from the stadium, but a burning pillar is about to crush them. Luckily, Daisy manages to hold the pillar back long enough for everyone else to get out. Frankie and Ronda rush into the building to rescue Daisy, and during this, father and daughter reconcile. Ronda manages to find Daisy just as she passes out from the smoke.

Daisy wakes up in the hospital and reunites with her parents, who apologize for not understanding her true passions. Everyone surprises Daisy by revealing that she has been called the "World's Bravest Animal", while Drago has been banned from the WSG and arrested for his crimes. Some time later, life on Quokka Rocks is much different and now, the other quokkas are following Daisy's example and are trying new things. Meanwhile, Frankie and Ronda have been busy making up for lost family time. Daisy lives out her dream as a WSG athlete, proving that champions can come in all shapes and sizes.

== Voice cast ==
- Angourie Rice as Daisy Quokka, a young quokka who dreams of becoming the next "World's Scariest Animal".
- Sam Neill as Frankie Scales, a saltwater crocodile who is a former WSG champion who coaches Daisy and is Ronda's father. Frankie makes a cameo appearance as a spectator in the film The Lost Tiger.
- Sharnee Tones as Ronda Saltie, a female saltwater crocodile who is Frankie's daughter.
- Grant Denyer and Lucy Durack as Mum and Dad Quokka, Daisy's parents.
- Frank Woodley as Flightless Feather, a cassowary who is the local news reporter and commentator for the WSG games.
- Andrew Cook as Jerry Whiskers, a red kangaroo who is Ronda's coach and Frankie's former WSG rival.
- Ricard Cussó as Drago Modo, a Komodo dragon who is Daisy's rival in the games. Cusso also voices Augustus Maximus, a cane toad who is the president of the WSG.

== Release and reception ==
Daisy Quokka: World's Scariest Animal had its world premiere at the Children's International Film Festival (CHIFF) in Australia on 28 November 2020. Due to the impact of the COVID-19 pandemic on cinemas, Daisy Quokka opened in Australia with a limited release in January 2021, distributed by Odin's Eye Entertainment. It was released in the United Kingdom on 2 July, making $72,971 in its opening week for a total of $146,172. It has a worldwide total of $174,186.
