= Ack Kinmonth =

Australian film and television composer

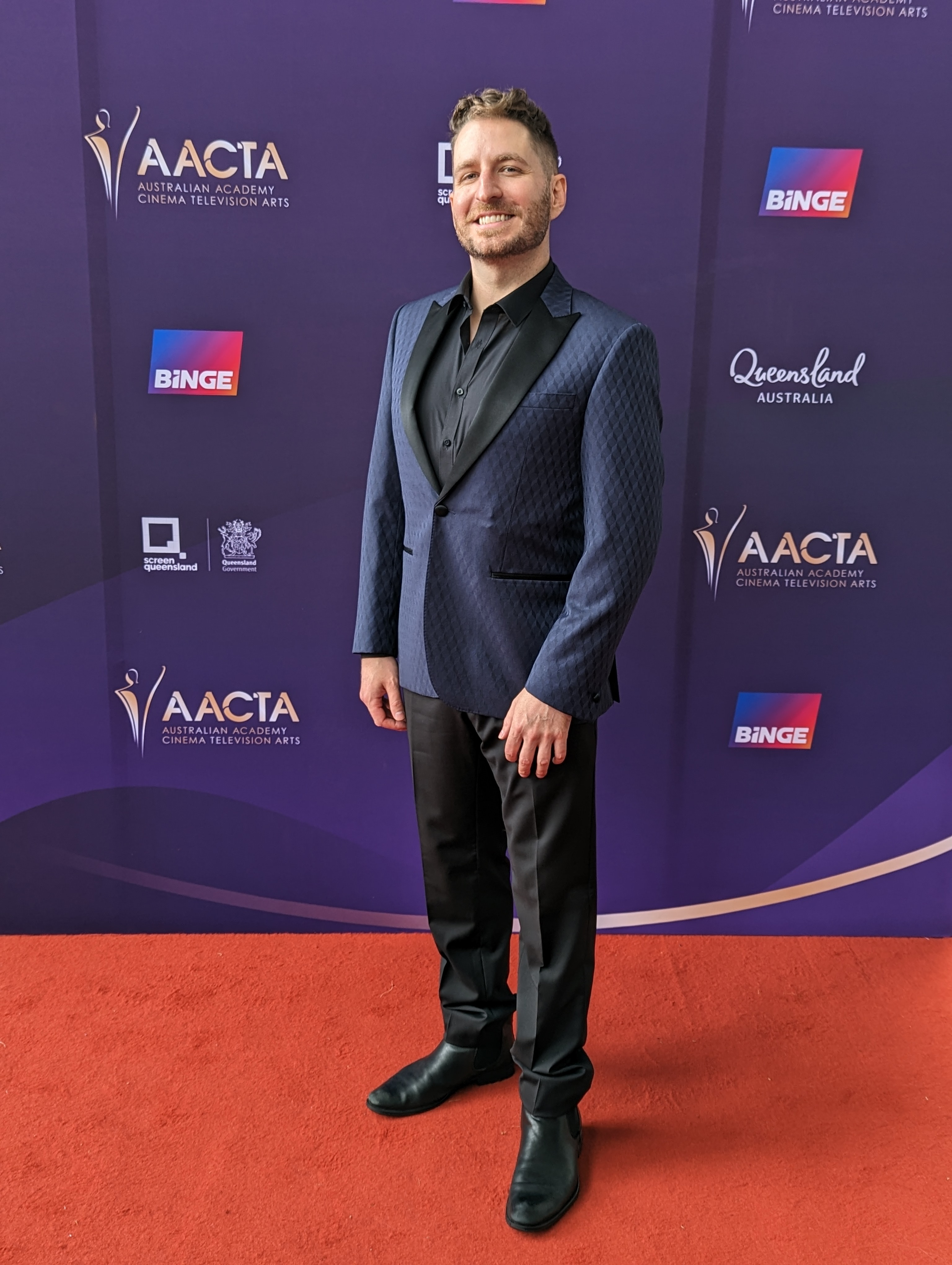
- Kinmonth at the 13th AACTA Awards

Background information
- Born: Anthony Craig Kinmonth; Brisbane, Queensland, Australia
- Genre: Film score
- Occupation: Film composer · producer · multi-instrumentalist
- Instrument: Guitar · synthesizer · keyboards
- Website: ackkinmonth.com

Anthony Craig "Ack" Kinmonth is a film and television composer from Brisbane, Australia. He is known for being the first Australian composer to write a featured song for the American children's television series, Sesame Street, titled "Five Kangaroos", in 2014. He has composed scores for several other TV series as well as numerous films, notably the animated films Scarygirl (2023), The Lost Tiger (2024), and The Pout-Pout Fish (2026).

== Early life ==
Anthony Craig Kinmonth, known as "Ack", was born in Brisbane, Queensland, Australia.

== Career ==
Kinmonth was the first Australian composer to write a featured song for the American children's television series, Sesame Street: "Five Kangaroos", in 2014. It aired during the show's 44th season, performed by Australian R&B singer, Jessica Mauboy. Australasian Performing Right Association reporter described it as a "catchy Australian tune" in March 2014. Kinmonth wrote a second song for the program, "Farm Animal Song (1-10 Hoedown)", which aired during its 45th season and was performed by Kinmonth and voice-over artist Kate Murphy.

Kinmonth was the composer for the TV miniseries, Texas Rising: The Lost Soldier (2015). He also served as the music editor and composer of additional music for Vikings: Athelstan's Journal. Both miniseries were distributed by the History Channel.

In 2022, Kinmonth scored Hugo Weaving's Ky's Story, made in collaboration with LiveLab and Autism Queensland.

His work for Scarygirl received an Aria Music Awards nomination in 2024. In that same year, Kinmonth composed music for The Sloth Lane, starring Leslie Jones, which premiered at the Annecy Festival.

== Awards and nominations ==
Kinmonth was the recipient of two bronze medals at the 2014 Brisbane Advertising and Design Club (BADC) Awards for his compositional work on a documentary series about HIV awareness for the HIV Foundation Queensland.

In 2022, Kinmonth won four Davey awards, for his advertising work on Repco - "100 Year", Ostelin - "Strong Women" and Supercheap Auto - "Carpark Carnage", as well as Best Use of Music for Daisy Quokka - World's Scariest Animal.

His score for Scarygirl received a nomination for the 2024 Aria Music Awards, in the Best Original Soundtrack or Musical Theatre Cast Album category.

=== APRA Awards ===
The APRA Awards are held in Australia and New Zealand by the Australasian Performing Right Association to recognise songwriting skills, sales and airplay performance by its members annually.

Year	Nominee / work	Award	Result	Ref.
2021	Daisy Quokka: World's Scariest Animal	Best Music for Children's Programming	Nominated	
2022	Ostelin: "Strong Women"	Best Music for an Advertisement	Nominated	
2023	Scarygirl	Best Music for Children's Programming	Nominated	
2024	The Sloth Lane	Best Music for Children's Programming	Nominated	

=== ARIA Music Awards ===
The ARIA Music Awards is an annual awards ceremony that recognises excellence, innovation, and achievement across all genres of Australian music.

Year	Nominee / work	Award	Result	Ref.
2024	Scarygirl	ARIA Award for Best Original Soundtrack, Cast or Show Album	Nominated	
2026	The Pout-Pout Fish (Original Motion Picture Soundtrack)	Best Original Soundtrack, Cast or Show Album	Nominated	

== Filmography ==
=== Films ===
- Tender – Composer (2012)
- Limbo – Composer, Sound Editor (2013)
- Factory hands – Composer (2014)
- Resonance - Composer (2015)
- Texas Rising: The Lost Soldier - Composer (2015)
- Vikings: Athelstan’s Journal – Composer (additional music), Music Editor (2015)
- The Wishmas Tree - Composer (2019)
- Combat Wombat (film) - Composer (2020)
- Daisy Quokka: World's Scariest Animal - Composer (2020)
- Christmas on the Farm - Composer (2021)
- Beyond the Reef - Composer (2022)
- Scarygirl - Composer (2023)
- Combat Wombat: Back 2 Back - Composer (2023)
- The Sloth Lane - Composer (2024)
- The Lost Tiger - Composer (2024)
- The Pout-Pout Fish - Composer (2026)

=== TV Series ===
- Um, Actually - Composer, 40 episodes (2018-2019)
- Bluey - Composer, 3 episodes (2018-2019)
- WTF 101 - Composer (2019)
- Big Weather (and How to Survive It) - Composer (2020)
- Refugia - Composer (2021)
- Rock Island Mysteries - Composer, 3 episodes (2022)
- Professor Eggtop's Extraordinary Experiments! - Composer (2023)
- Smiling Mind Creek - Composer (2023)

== Soundtrack ==
- Sesame Street – "Five Kangaroos" – Writer (March 2014)
- Another Country – "Fuse" – Writer, Performer (2015)
- Sesame Street – "Farm Animal Song!" – Writer (2015)
