= The Lost Tiger =

- Theatrical release poster
- Directed by: Chantelle Murray
- Written by: Philip Tarl Denson; Chantelle Murray; Anthony Mullins
- Produced by: Nadine Bates; Kristen Souvlis; Ryan Greaves; Chantelle Murray
- Starring: Thomas Weatherall; Rhys Darby; Celeste Barber; Jimi Bani; Nakkiah Lui
- Music by: Ack Kinmonth
- Production companies: Maslow Entertainment; Like a Photon Creative
- Distributed by: Sola Media (international sales); Universal Pictures (Australia)
- Release dates: 26 October 2024 (Brisbane International Film Festival); 27 February 2025 (Australia)
- Running time: 82 minutes
- Country: Australia
- Language: English

The Lost Tiger is a 2024 Australian animated adventure film directed and co-written by Chantelle Murray, in her feature directorial debut. The film follows Teo, one of the last thylacines ("Tasmanian tigers"), who is taken by a family of kangaroos, and he embarks on an adventure to save his homeland from being destroyed. The Lost Tiger is a sixth film in Like a Photon Creative's The Tales from Sanctuary City franchise.

The film premiered at the Brisbane International Film Festival on 26 October 2024, and was released in Australia on 27 February 2025 by Universal Pictures and Maslow Entertainment.

== Premise ==
Teo, believed to be the last thylacine, is taken in by a family of kangaroos. Teo carries with him a mysterious crystal necklace, the only clue left by those who abandoned him.

== Voice cast ==
- Thomas Weatherall as Teo
- Rhys Darby as Plato
- Celeste Barber as Quinella
- Jimi Bani as Red
- Nakkiah Lui as Kara

== Production ==
The Lost Tiger was the debut animated feature film directed by filmmaker Chantelle Murray, who grew up in Djarindjin Community in the Kimberley, Western Australia. Murray is of mixed descent, with a white father and Malaysian / Aboriginal primary school teacher mother of Bardi descent. The film was co-written by Murray, Philip Tarl Denson, and Anthony Mullins. It is the first Australian animated film to be written and directed by an Indigenous Australian woman, and explores themes of identity and heritage.

It was co-produced by Nadine Bates and Kristen Souvlis of Brisbane studio Like a Photon Creative, along with Ryan Greaves and Chantelle Murray.

The animation is created using a process in which only every second frame is animated, known as "stepped keys". Computer-animated film usually show 24 frames of motion per second, but using this method, the viewer sees only 12 frames per second. This pose-to-pose movement gives the film a "stop-motion feel". The Lost Tiger is the sixth film in Like a Photon Creative's The Tales from Sanctuary City franchise.

The score was composed by Ack Kinmonth, and the film was supported by Screen Queensland.

The film is 82 minutes long.

== Release ==
The Lost Tiger premiered at the Brisbane International Film Festival on 26 October 2024. It was also screened at the Perth Festival on 11 January 2025, and at the ImagineNATIVE festival in Toronto, Canada, in June of that year.

It was released in Australian cinemas on 27 February 2025 by Maslow Entertainment.

== Reception ==
Luke Buckmaster, writing in The Guardian, gave the film 3 out of 5 stars, noting that "the emotional moments in The Lost Tiger work out pretty well: in fact, lines such as 'this is your land, this is your country' register as genuinely profound".
