= Morgan Davies =

Australian film and television actor

- Born: 27 November 2001 (age 24); Sydney, Australia
- Occupation: Actor
- Years active: 2008–present

Morgan Davies (born November 27, 2001) is an Australian actor most known for his roles in Evil Dead Rise (2023) and One Piece (2023–present).

== Early and personal life ==
Davies came out as transgender to a small number of close family and friends at age 13, but did not publicly come out until 2020. Davies has become an advocate for transgender rights and has publicly talked about his battles with depression as a teenager and his stage fright. He grew up in the Sydney suburb of Rozelle with a single mother.

== Career ==
Davies began his career as a child actor at age 7, starring as Brittany in the 2008 movie Green Fire Envy. His breakout role was in the 2010 Australian-French film The Tree, in which he played Simone alongside lead actress Charlotte Gainsbourg. The film premiered as the closing night selection of the Cannes Film Festival and earned him nominations from the Australian Film Institute. The Calgary Herald praised his touching performance in the film, and Julie Bertuccelli, the director of The Tree, called him "terrific". The following year, Davies appeared as Katie in The Hunter, starring Willem Dafoe, which premiered at the Toronto International Film Festival.

Davies also appeared in the Steven Spielberg-produced television series Terra Nova (2011) and starred in and assistant directed the short film The Boyfriend Game (2015). He played Madeline in the 2019 Australian movie Storm Boy alongside Geoffrey Rush and Jai Courtney.

He starred in the 2020 television series The End as Oberon, a trans teen in the process of gender transition. He initially turned the role down due to not feeling comfortable playing the character while still struggling with his own gender identity, but later decided to accept the role.

Davies had a leading role in Evil Dead Rise (2023), the fifth installment of the Evil Dead franchise, as the teenage boy Danny, one of the film's central characters.

He plays the role of Koby in One Piece, the 2023 live-action adaptation of the manga of the same name and its 2026 second season.

== Filmography ==
=== Films ===
Year	Title	Role	Notes
2008	Green Fire Envy	Brittany	
2010	The Tree	Simone	
2011	The Hunter	Sass Armstrong	
2011	Julian	Cassandra	Short film
2019	Storm Boy	Madeline	
2021	Beautiful They	Blue	Short film
2022	Blaze	Young man	
2023	Evil Dead Rise	Danny "Dan" Bixler	

=== Television series ===
Year	Title	Role	Notes
2011	Terra Nova	Leah Marcos	2 episodes
2014	Devil's Playground	Bridie Allen	6 episodes
2017	The Girlfriend Experience	Kayla	7 episodes
2020	The End	Oberon Brennan / Titania Brennan	10 episodes
2023–present	One Piece	Koby	(Main, season 1; Guest, season 2)

=== As director ===
Year	Title	Notes
2015	The Boyfriend Game	Second assistant director; short film

== Awards and nominations ==
Awards
Year	Media	Award	Result	Notes
2010	The Tree	AFI Young Actress Award	Nominated	
2010	The Tree	AFI Award for Best Actress in a Leading Role	Nominated	
2011	The Tree	Film Critics Circle of Australia Award – Best Supporting Actress – Female	Nominated	
2011	The Hunter	AACTA Award for Best Actress in a Supporting Role	Nominated	
2012	The Hunter	Film Critics Circle of Australia Award – Best Performance by a Young Actress	Nominated	
