= The Sloth Lane =

2024 animated film

- Theatrical release poster
- Directed by: Tania Vincent
- Written by: Tania Vincent; Ryan Greaves
- Story by: Tania Vincent; Ryan Greaves; Erica Harrison
- Produced by: Kristen Souvlis; Nadine Bates; Ryan Greaves
- Starring: Teo Vergara; Olivia Vásquez; Ben Gorroño; Facundo Herrera; Remy Hii; Leslie Jones
- Edited by: Josef Switak
- Music by: Ack Kinmonth
- Production companies: Like A Photon Creative; Screen Queensland Studios; Cosmic Dino Studio; Maslow Entertainment
- Distributed by: Sola Media (international sales); Universal Pictures (Australia); Blue Fox Entertainment (United States)
- Release dates: 10 June 2024 (Annecy); 15 June 2024 (Sydney Film Festival); 25 July 2024 (Australia); 28 February 2025 (United States)
- Running time: 89 minutes
- Country: Australia
- Language: English
- Box office: $1.4 million

The Sloth Lane (also known in the United States as A Sloth Story) is a 2024 Australian animated adventure-comedy film directed by Tania Vincent. It is the fifth film in Like a Photon Creative's The Tales from Sanctuary City franchise. The film stars the voices of Teo Vergara, Olivia Vásquez, Ben Gorroño, Facundo Herrera, Remy Hii, and Leslie Jones.

Produced by Like A Photon Creative and Screen Queensland Studios with animation services by Cosmic Dino Studio, The Sloth Lane had its world premiere at the Annecy Animation Film Festival in France on 10 June 2024, and was released by Maslow Entertainment in Australia on 25 July.

== Plot ==
Laura Romero and her family of Mexican sloths move to Sanctuary City after their family restaurant is destroyed by the storm. After moving to the city with their old food truck, they all have to adapt to life in the fast lane, while remembering and respecting their family and cultural customs. Armed with their family recipes that have been perfected for generations, their food truck becomes a huge success, which does not go unnoticed by entrepreneur and snappy dresser, Dotti Pace. After being deceived into giving up their secret recipes, Laura and her family must defy the odds and find a way to get their beloved recipe book back.

== Voice cast ==
- Teo Vergara as Laura Romero, a 12-years old sloth and the daughter of the Romero family
- Olivia Vásquez as Gabriella Romero Flores, the mother of the Romero family
- Ben Gorroño as Luis Romero, the father of the Romero family
- Facundo Herrera as Mani Romero, the son of the Romero family
- Leslie Jones as Dotti Pace, a cheetah who works as a fast food magnate
- Remy Hii as Platy, a platypus and Dotti Pace's henchmen
- Matteo Romaniuk as Arlo, a kiwi
- Dan Brumm as Chief Furbank, an elderly dingo who works as a state guard

== Production ==
The film's voice cast was revealed in October 2023 that included Leslie Jones, Teo Vergara, Olivia Vásquez, Ben Gorroño, Facundo Herrera, Remy Hii and Matteo Romaniuk. Dan Brumm joined the cast the following year in May.

== Release ==
The Sloth Lane had its world premiere screening at the Annecy International Animation Film Festival on 10 June 2024. It then screened at Sydney Film Festival on 15 June ahead of its domestic theatrical release in Australia on 25 July.

The film has international sales by the Stuttgart-based company Sola Media and opened in US theatres on 28 February 2025, distributed by Blue Fox Entertainment using the name A Sloth Story.

== Reception ==
=== Critical response ===
Metacritic review
breakdown (unweighted)

Positive
2 (50%)
Mixed
2 (50%)
Negative
0 (0%)

On the review aggregator website Rotten Tomatoes, 71% of 17 critics' reviews are positive, with an average rating of 5.6/10. Metacritic, which uses a weighted average, assigned the film a score of 56 out of 100, based on 4 critics, indicating "mixed or average" reviews.
