= Never Too Late (2020 film) =

- Theatrical release poster
- Directed by: Mark Lamprell
- Screenplay by: Luke Preston
- Story by: Grant Carter; Luke Preston
- Produced by: Antony I. Ginnane; David Lightfoot
- Starring: James Cromwell; Dennis Waterman; Roy Billing; Shane Jacobson; Jack Thompson; Jacki Weaver
- Cinematography: Peter Falk
- Edited by: Marc van Buuren
- Music by: Angela Little
- Production companies: Screen Australia; F.G. Film Productions; South Australian Film Corporation; Myriad Pictures; McMahon International Pictures; The Post Lounge; White Hot Productions; Filmology Finance
- Distributed by: R&R Films
- Release dates: 19 February 2020 (Young at Heart Festival); 10 July 2020 (United States)
- Running time: 98 minutes
- Country: Australia
- Language: English
- Box office: $844,581

Never Too Late is a 2020 Australian comedy film directed by Mark Lamprell and starring James Cromwell and Jacki Weaver. The film also features Dennis Waterman, Roy Billing, Jack Thompson and Shane Jacobson.

== Plot ==
Four former prisoners of war, members of an elite squad "the Chainbreakers", who broke out of their prison in Vietnam, are now residents of Hogan Hills, a retirement home for returned veterans. Each has some unfinished business "outside", but they are not allowed to leave as they are under the Mental Health Act.

Bronson, an American, was their leader and has feigned symptoms to be near Norma, once an Army nurse with whom he fell in love, but is now a widow suffering Alzheimer's disease. His leadership is blamed by the others for their incarceration in Vietnam. Caine would love to go sailing on his yacht but is restrained for his own safety. Wendell is a wheelchair-using former bikie and bank robber: he still wears gloves, flannelette shirt and badged vest. Between jail and the "home", he has not been "outside" since 1975. Alienated from his son Bruce, his letters are always returned unopened. He regrets never taking Bruce to a football game. Angus is an ex-VFL footballer for Collingwood, "the mighty Magpies", and winner of the 1973 Brownlow medal (Note: The real-life winner of the 1973 Brownlow Medal was Keith Greig; he won it again in 1974.) but was disqualified for punching an opponent, so never received it. They enlist the aid of Elliot, a young orderly who is son of Lin, the Vietnam-born matron in charge. Unknown to the four, she is the daughter of a prison guard who refrained from shooting the escapees and was executed for his failure.

After several foiled attempts, they escape in a hearse, pick up Bruce and while Wendell and his son are watching the game at Adelaide Oval (Adelaide Crows v. Port Power); Angus steals the medal from its display case. They escape in the Glenelg tram, and manage to persuade the police that they are innocent tourists. Bronson meets Norma on the jetty; she accepts his proposal. They proceed to the marina where Caine's yacht is moored; he sails off for the horizon. In the final scene Bronson tells Lin about her father and offers his thanks, Norma returns to the retirement home but fails to recognise Bronson, Angus is still wearing his medal and Bruce has become his father's caregiver.

== Cast ==
- James Cromwell as Jack Bronson
- Dennis Waterman as Jeremiah Caine
- Roy Billing as James Wendell
- Shane Jacobson as Bruce Wendell
- Jack Thompson as Angus Wilson
- Jacki Weaver as Norma McCarthy
- Renee Lim as Lin (matron in charge)
- Zachary Wan as Elliot (her son, an orderly)
- Edmund Pegge as Howard
- Ling-Hsueh Tang as Kate

== Production ==
Never Too Late was directed by Mark Lamprell, written by Grant Carter and Luke Preston, produced by Antony I. Ginnane and David Lightfoot, with executive producers Jack Christian and Kirk D'Amico.

The film was shot in Adelaide, South Australia throughout March and April 2019. Some of the scenes were shot at the Adelaide Oval where dozens of extras were needed to appear in the movie as supporters of local AFL teams Adelaide Crows and Port Adelaide.

== Soundtrack ==
The film features original music by Angela Little, also songs from the 1960s and 1979s performed by Lior: House of the Rising Sun (Traditional), Catch the Wind (Donovan), Mad World (Orzabal), and I Can See Clearly Now (Johnny Nash). These are not included on the soundtrack album.

== Release ==
The film premiered at Adelaide's Young at Heart Festival on 19 February 2020. It was scheduled to be released digitally in the United States on 10 July 2020.

It was distributed by R&R Films.

== Critical reception ==
Never Too Late received mixed reviews, earning an approval rating of 46% on Rotten Tomatoes, based on 24 reviews.

- "With this line-up, Lamprell should have turned the film into a celebration of some great screen careers. Instead, it winds up as a sad waste of talent."
- Standard and sentimental. You can see where it's going, but it's fun and benign anyway to see how they work this out.
