= Julian (2012 film) =

- Directed by: Matthew Moore
- Written by: Matthew Moore
- Produced by: Matthew Moore; Robert Jago
- Starring: Ed Oxenbould; Leon Ford; Morgan Davies (Note: Credited as Morgana Davies)
- Cinematography: Stuart O'Rourke
- Edited by: Christian Barratt-Hill
- Music by: Adam Sofo
- Production company: Year of the Rabbit Films
- Release date: 2012
- Running time: 14 minutes
- Country: Australia
- Language: English

Julian is a 2012 Australian short film written and directed by Matthew Moore.

The film is set in a 1981 classroom. It explores a day in the life of a nine-year-old Julian Assange, played by a then-unknown Ed Oxenbould.

Julian won a Flickerfest Special Jury Award, a Crystal Bear at the Berlin International Film Festival and an AACTA Award for Best Short Fiction Film. Lead actor, Ed Oxenbould, was nominated for an AACTA for Best Young Actor.

== Cast ==
- Ed Oxenbould as Julian
- Leon Ford as Mr. Braybon
- Morgan Davies as Cassandra
- Joseph Famularo as Geoff
- Will Cottle as Carl
- Christopher Stollery as Mr. Dexter
- Catherine Moore as Mrs. Cunliffe
