= The Pout-Pout Fish (film) =

2026 animated film

- Australian theatrical release poster
- Directed by: Ricard Cussó
- Written by: Elise Allen; Elie Choufany; Dominic Morris
- Based on: The Pout-Pout Fish by Deborah Diesen
- Produced by: Nadine Bates; Madeira Ginley; Kristen Souvlis; Cyma Zarghami
- Starring: Nick Offerman; Nina Oyama; Miranda Otto; Remy Hii; Mark Coles Smith; Nazeem Hussain; Jordin Sparks; Amy Sedaris
- Edited by: Ahmad Halimi
- Music by: Ack Kinmonth
- Production companies: MIMO Studios; Like a Photon Creative; Cosmic Dino Studio; Alceon Entertainment; Eclectik Vision
- Distributed by: Viva Pictures (United States); Maslow Entertainment (Australia and New Zealand)
- Release dates: January 1, 2026 (Australia); March 20, 2026 (United States)
- Running time: 92 minutes
- Countries: Australia; United States
- Language: English
- Budget: <$10 million
- Box office: $5.4 million

The Pout-Pout Fish is a 2026 animated comedy film directed by Ricard Cussó and written by Elise Allen, Elie Choufany, and Dominic Morris, based on the children's book by Deborah Diesen. It is an international co-production between Australia and United States and features the voices of Nick Offerman, Nina Oyama, Miranda Otto, Remy Hii, Mark Coles Smith, Nazeem Hussain, Jordin Sparks, and Amy Sedaris. The film was released theatrically on January 1, 2026 in Australia and on March 20, 2026 in the United States. It received mixed reviews from critics.

== Plot ==
Mr. Fish lives in a coral reef society. Described as glum and gloomy, he meets baby sea dragon Pip at his shipwreck home. Pip needs help expanding her home to accommodate for her hundreds of siblings. At first, Mr. Fish declines, but changes his mind after both his and Pip's homes are destroyed. Instead of rebuilding, Pip suggests they visit Shimmer, a mysterious, wish-granting fish.

Underneath the reef is an abyss home to a pod of cuttlefish, led by their leader Marin, who is in danger of being cut off from the sun due to kelp growth and will soon be forced to relocate. Benji, her son, does not wish to leave, deciding to seek out Shimmer as well. This puts both Benji and Mr. Fish in a race to find Shimmer, as it is rumored that she can only fulfill one wish every few years.

Mr. Fish and Pip make their way to Shimmer, by rescuing two jellyfish, helping three dolphins, and helping a mother whale find her child, with the assistance of an eel. They eventually reach Shimmer, but are interrupted when Benji kidnaps her. Benji arrives at the abyss with Shimmer with others trailing behind, when she reveals that she can't actually fulfill wishes. Because of this, the cuttlefish relocate to the reef above, with Marin disowning Benji. They hypnotize its residents into exile. In an attempt to save the reef, Mr. Fish and Pip call upon the animals they helped. They manage to remove all of the kelp, allowing the cuttlefish to return to their homes.

After they return, Mr. Fish has his home rebuilt, and Pip's family moves to a cruise shipwreck fitting all of her siblings. Pip reveals to Mr. Fish that she wrote a story named "The Pout-Pout Fish", of which the film is depicting. As Pip leaves, Mr. Fish is greeted by Shimmer, who the former tries asking out, unaware that the eel accidentally caused his home to be destroyed again.

== Voice cast ==
- Nick Offerman as Mr. Fish, a short-tempered sky blue and purple ocean pout
- Nina Oyama as Pip, a hyperactive baby yellow leafy seadragon
- Miranda Otto as Marin, a female red cuttlefish
- Remy Hii as Benji, an orange cuttlefish
- Jordin Sparks as Shimmer, a mystical pink Siamese fighting fish
- Amy Sedaris as Brigitta, Greta and Karina, three pink Dolphins
- Nazeem Hussain as Archie, a blue cuttlefish with glasses
- Mark Coles Smith as Hector, an orange octopus shop owner
- Grant Denyer as Beautiful Mike
- Lloyd Langford as a bioluminescent eel
- Mel Buttle as Shaz, a purple box jellyfish

== Release ==
The Pout-Pout Fish was released theatrically on January 1, 2026 in Australia by Maslow Entertainment and was released on March 20 in the United States, by Viva Pictures.

== Reception ==
=== Critical response ===
On the review aggregator website Rotten Tomatoes, 61% of 31 critics' reviews are positive, with an average rating of 5.8/10. The website's consensus reads: "Appealing and colorful without being particularly distinctive, this animated adventure is a small fish in the big pond of family entertainment but can be relied upon to turn a frown upside down."

Catherine Bray of The Guardian gave the film two out of five, writing: "Based on the books by Deborah Diesen and Dan Hanna, The Pout-Pout Fish’s animation lacks the charm of the books’ illustrations, and the writing is uninspired."
