= Combat Wombat (film) =

2020 Australian animated superhero film

- Theatrical release poster
- Directed by: Ricard Cussó
- Written by: Matthew James Kinmonth
- Produced by: Kristen Souvlis; Nadine Bates
- Starring: Deborah Mailman; Ed Oxenbould; Frank Woodley; Judith Lucy; George Pullar
- Edited by: Michelle McGilvray
- Music by: Ack Kinmonth
- Production company: Like a Photon Creative
- Distributed by: Odin's Eye Entertainment
- Release dates: 11 October 2020 (Brisbane International Film Festival); 15 October 2020 (Australia)
- Running time: 80 minutes
- Country: Australia
- Language: English
- Box office: $164,199

Combat Wombat is a 2020 Australian animated superhero film directed by Richard Cussó and written by Matthew James Kinmonth. It is the second film in Like a Photon Creative's The Tales from Sanctuary City franchise and was financed by Screen Queensland and Screen Australia. It premiered at the Brisbane International Film Festival before being released in Australian theatres on 15 October 2020, distributed by Odin's Eye Entertainment.

== Premise ==
Lazy wombat Maggie Diggins becomes Combat Wombat, Sanctuary City's new superhero after she begrudgingly saves a citizen from falling to his death, but her rising stardom displeases local superhero Flightless Feather, who hatches a plan for Maggie's demise. Maggie uncovers a conspiracy that could put the city in grave danger, and it is up to her to expose it.

== Voice cast ==
- Deborah Mailman as Maggie Diggins / Combat Wombat
- Ed Oxenbould as Sweetie
- Frank Woodley as Flightless Feather
- Judith Lucy as PR manager CeCe
- George Pullar as Bradley Burrows / Raccoon Bandit

== Release and reception ==
Combat Wombat was released in Australian theatres on 15 October 2020, distributed by Odin's Eye Entertainment. It had a limited release on 42 screens. At the box office it grossed $164,199. It received positive reviews from critics.

== Sequel ==
A sequel, titled Combat Wombat: Back 2 Back, was released in February 2024 in Australia by Maslow Entertainment.
