= Oliver Twist (1982 Australian film) =

- Based on: Oliver Twist by Charles Dickens
- Written by: John Palmer
- Directed by: Richard Slapczynski
- Music by: Richard Bowden
- Country of origin: Australia
- Original language: English

Production
- Producer: George Stephenson
- Editor: Peter Siegl
- Running time: 72 minutes

Original release
- Network: Nine Network Australia
- Release: 15 December 1982

Oliver Twist is a 1982 Australian 72-minute made-for-television animated film from Burbank Films Australia, a part of the studio's series of adaptations of Charles Dickens' works made from 1982 through 1985.

It was originally broadcast in 1982 through Nine Network Australia.

The film is based on Charles Dickens' classic 1838 English novel, Oliver Twist, and was adapted by John Palmer. It was produced by George Stephenson and directed by Richard Slapczynski. A second live-action, made-for-television title under the same name was produced in the same year. All copyright in this film is currently owned by HS Holding Corporation who controls the licensing of this film. Different companies, including the American GoodTimes Entertainment and Digiview Entertainment, distributed the film for home video around the globe.

== Plot ==
Oliver Twist is born at the workhouse of Mr. Bumble, where he is left an orphan as his mother dies shortly after giving birth to him. Mr. Bumble, just as he does with all his other orphans, puts Oliver to daily work, giving him in exchange little more than a daily bowl of porridge. One day, outraged that Oliver would dare supplicate for more food, Mr. Bumble sells the boy to Mr. Sowerberry, an undertaker, who makes him an apprentice at his funeral home. There, Oliver is humiliated and insulted by Noah, Mr. Sowerberry's other apprentice. Tired of this life, Oliver runs away from the funeral home and heads for the city of London where he meets the Artful Dodger. The Artful Dodger takes Oliver to the home of Fagin, a seemingly kind old man who turns homeless boys into shameless pickpockets. There, Oliver is trained to wander the streets stealing from ladies and gentlemen. When Oliver witnesses the Artful Dodger and another boy named Charlie stealing the handkerchief of Mr. Brownlow as he browses the books at a street bookshop, Oliver flees. The suspicious act on Oliver's part arouses the attention of Mr. Brownlow and accuses him of theft. When caught, Oliver is taken before a magistrate, treated as a cold-blooded criminal and sentenced to transportation to Australia. Mr. Brownlow confronts the magistrate, telling him that his sentence is too harsh and that he never did see Oliver actually steal the piece of cloth. Mr. Brownlow takes a liking towards Oliver and invites him to live in his home. Mr. Monks, a sinister man, seeks information about Oliver from Mr. and Mrs. Bumble, when they present him with a locket that the old nurse Sally had taken from Oliver's mother. Mr. Monks wishes Oliver to be involved in a crime and imprisoned, so he may claim the inheritance that is rightfully Oliver's.

== Characters ==
- Oliver Twist is a ten-year-old orphaned boy born at Mr. Bumble's workhouse. He experiences many hardships and cruelty from greedy villains before finding his rightful place in the world.
- Mr. Brownlow is an old friend of Oliver Twist's mother, his path is crossed with Oliver's when he believes the boy had stolen his handkerchief.
- Fagin is a seemingly kind and harmless old man who collects homeless boys from the streets and teaches them to steal from people, thus making his own fortune.
- Artful Dodger is Oliver's first friend and Fagin's preferred boy. He is streetwise and the best among Fagin's band of pickpockets.
- Nancy is the girlfriend of Bill Sykes. She takes pity towards Oliver and tries to help him into a new, better life, which ends up costing her her own.
- Bill Sykes is determined to see Oliver commit a crime in order to receive compensation from Mr. Monks, no matter whose life may be at stake.
- Mr. Monks is revealed to be Oliver Twist's own brother and wishes to take his inheritance from him by involving the young boy in a crime. He believes he's destroyed the last evidence of Oliver's parentage when he destroys the golden locket Sally gives to Mrs. Bumble.
- Mr. Bumble is the owner of the workhouse where Oliver Twist is born. He is a cruel man and forces his boys to hard work from the day they're capable of standing on their feet.
- Sally is an old nurse working for Mr. Bumble at his workhouse, where she is abused and ill-treated. She nurses Oliver Twist's mother as she gives birth to her son and is with her when she dies. She notices Agnes, Oliver's mother, dropping an old locket on the ground; she picks it up and holds on to it. Ten years later and shortly before dying, she apologetically gives the locket to Mrs. Bumble and supplicates her to give the piece of jewelry to Oliver, so that he may know who he is.

== See also ==
- Oliver Twist
- Charles Dickens
- Burbank Films Australia
