= Richard Slapczynski =

- Born: Ryszard Słapczyński; 1934 (age 91–92)
- Occupations: Animator, director, screenwriter

Ryszard Słapczyński (born 1934) is a Polish and Australian animation director and screenwriter.

== Selected animated filmography ==
- 1969: Georgie to the Rescue
- 1969-1971: The Strange Adventures of Matołek the Billy-Goat (Dziwne przygody Koziołka Matołka)
- 1971: Czarna krowa w kropki bordo...
- 1970: Kochajmy straszydła
- 1972–1976: Pies, kot i...
- 1977: A Journey to the Center of the Earth
- 1979: Off on a Comet
- 1982: Oliver Twist
- 1987: Alice Through the Looking Glass
- 1991: Ali Baba
- 1996: Beauty and the Beast
- 1997: Camelot (animated)
- 2001: The Canterville Ghost (animated)

== Awards ==
1973: International Young Audience Film Festival "Ale Kino!" (Poznań) - Silver Goats (for an animated film Czarna krowa w kropki bordo...)
