= H Is for Happiness =

2019 film directed by John Sheedy

H is for Happiness
- Theatrical movie poster
- Directed by: John Sheedy
- Written by: Lisa Hoppe
- Based on: My Life as an Alphabet by Barry Jonsberg
- Produced by: Julie Ryan; Tenille Kennedy; Lisa Hoppe
- Starring: Daisy Axon; Wesley Patten; Richard Roxburgh; Emma Booth
- Cinematography: Bonnie Elliott
- Edited by: Johanna Scott
- Music by: Nerida Tyson-Chew
- Production companies: Cyan Films; The Koop; Screen Australia; ScreenWest; Film Victoria; Melbourne International Film Festival Premiere
- Distributed by: R & R Films for Universal Pictures
- Release dates: 11 August 2019 (Melbourne International Film Festival); 6 February 2020 (Australia)
- Running time: 103 minutes
- Country: Australia
- Language: English
- Box office: $142,855

H is for Happiness is a 2019 Australian family film directed by John Sheedy, written by Lisa Hoppe, and starring Daisy Axon, Wesley Patten, Richard Roxburgh, Emma Booth, Joel Jackson, Deborah Mailman, Miriam Margolyes, Alessandra Tognini.

== Premise ==
A twelve-year-old girl is inspired by the strange new boy at school and sets out to mend her broken family – whatever it takes.

== Cast ==
- Daisy Axon as Candice Phee
- Wesley Patten as Douglas Benson
- Richard Roxburgh as Jim Phee
- Emma Booth as Claire Phee
- Miriam Margolyes as Miss Bamford
- Joel Jackson as Rich Uncle Brian
- Deborah Mailman as Penelope Benson

== Production ==
The script is based on the Australian young adult novel My Life as an Alphabet, by Barry Jonsberg, with the screenplay written by Lisa Hoppe.

The film was shot in Albany, Western Australia from 12 November 2018 to 21 December 2018.

== Release ==
The film premiered at the Melbourne International Film Festival in 2019, where it won second place in the audience awards, and also screened at the Perth Festival.

It was distributed by R & R Films for Universal Pictures.

== Reception ==
Review aggregator Rotten Tomatoes reported that 77% of critics reviewed the film positively, with an average score of 6.7/10, based on 31 reviews. The site's critical consensus reads, "A feel-good family film that's as visually vibrant as its sunny outlook, H Is for Happiness finds a universal message in its young protagonist's journey".

Alissa Simon of Variety said that the film, "Provides feel-good entertainment for the entire family without pandering – and definitely without sacrificing style or substance". David Stratton wrote, "What could have been trite and mawkish turns out to be really rather engaging".

Dov Kornits of Filmink called the film, "incredibly generous hearted, embracing the rich, the poor, the normal, the damaged, the eccentric, the humanity in equal measure".

Andrew F. Peirce of The Curb said, "I can say with complete certainty that I have not smiled this hard after a film in a very long time."

Conversely, Paul Byrnes of the Sydney Morning Herald argued, "Sheedy never finds the right tone for this ambitious project. Candice's florid language is great on paper, one of the main attractions of the book, but it's almost impossible to translate to the screen."

Leigh Paatsch of the Herald Sun said, "Some nice work does continually surface during H is for Happiness, but so too do its niggling inconsistencies. A less-is-more approach might have been the better way to go."

== Box office ==
Box office sales were disappointing on its opening weekend, taking only A$96,000 across 158 screens; it was outdone in its pre-release screenings, taking A$117,000.
