= Ed Oxenbould =

Australian actor

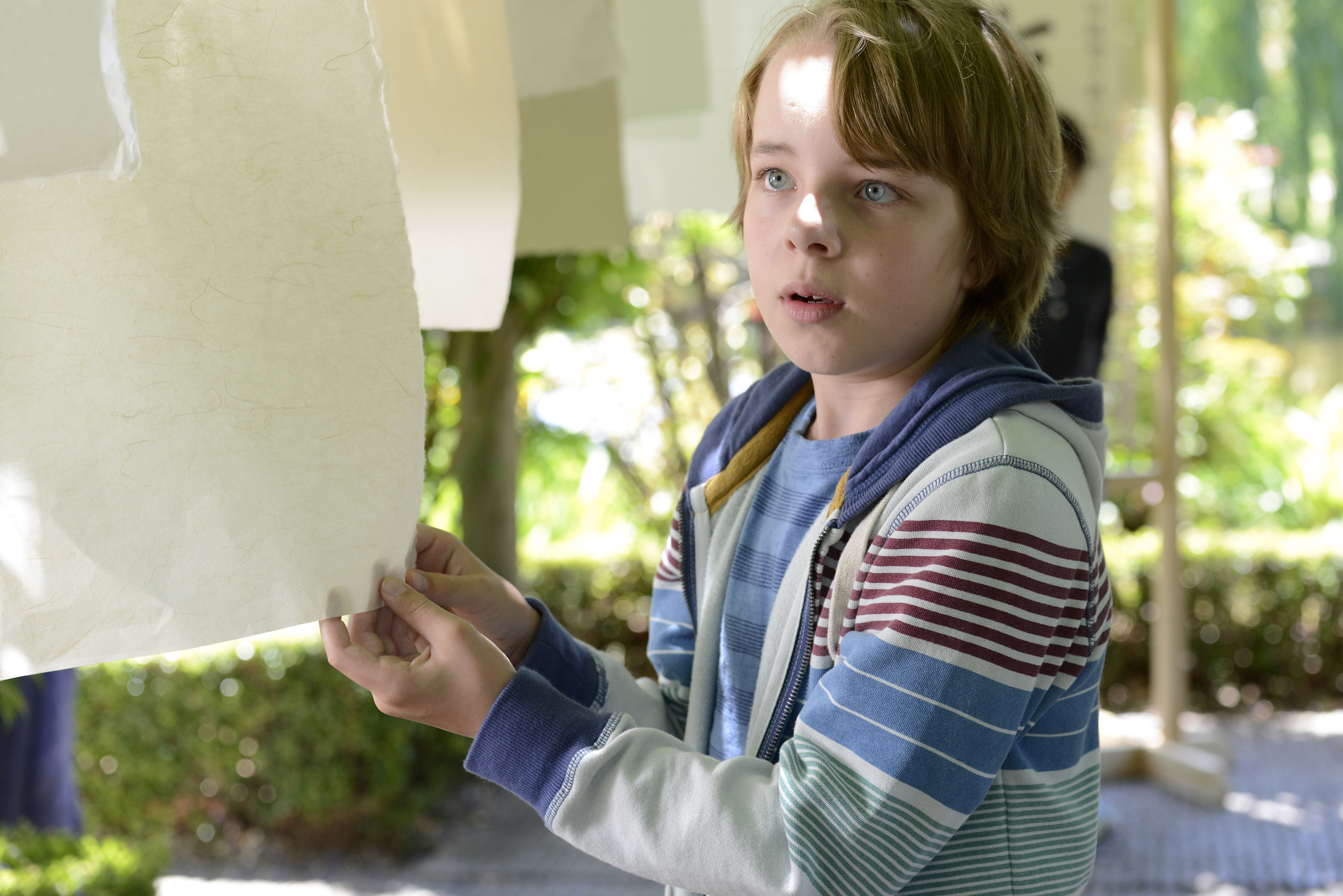
- Ed Oxenbould in 2013
- Born: 1 June 2001 (age 25); Australia
- Occupation: Actor
- Years active: 2011–present
- Relatives: Ben Oxenbould (uncle)

Ed Oxenbould (born 1 June 2001) is an Australian actor. He rose to prominence for his role in the film Julian (2012). Subsequently, he appeared in the television series Puberty Blues (2012–2014) and became more well-known for his role in the film Alexander and the Terrible, Horrible, No Good, Very Bad Day (2014). He continued to gain fame for his roles in the films Paper Planes (2015), The Visit (2015), Better Watch Out (2016), Wildlife (2018), and Nugget is Dead? (2024).

== Early life and education ==
Oxenbould was born in Melbourne, the son of actors Diane Adams and Jamie Oxenbould. He is the nephew of comedian/actor Ben Oxenbould.

== Career ==
He starred in the 2012 Australian short film Julian, directed by Matthew Moore, in which he played the title role (a 9-year-old Julian Assange). He was nominated for the AACTA Award for Best Young Actor. He then starred in the Australian television show Puberty Blues as David Vickers, a 10-year-old boy.

Oxenbould co-starred as Dylan in the 2014 film Paper Planes along with Sam Worthington, which premiered at the Toronto International Film Festival. On 24 June 2013, Oxenbould was added to the cast of Disney's film Alexander and the Terrible, Horrible, No Good, Very Bad Day, in which he played the title role of Alexander. Miguel Arteta directed the comedy film, which was released on 10 October 2014.

Oxenbould won the Las Vegas Film Critics Society Sierra Award for Best Youth Male Performance for his role in the 2018 American indie film Wildlife.

== Filmography ==
=== Film ===
Year	Title	Role	Notes
2012	Julian	Julian Assange	Short film
2014	Alexander and the Terrible, Horrible, No Good, Very Bad Day	Alexander Cooper	
2014	Paper Planes	Dylan Webber	
2015	The Visit	Tyler Jamison	
2016	Better Watch Out	Garrett	
2017	The Butterfly Tree	Fin	
2018	Wildlife	Joe Brinson	
2019	Being Gavin	Josh	
2019	The Wishmas Tree	Sweetie	Voice role; supporting character
2020	Combat Wombat	Sweetie	Voice role
2021	The Exchange	Tim	
2024	Before Dawn	Don	
2024	Head South	Angus	
2024	Nugget Is Dead: A Christmas Story?	Ryan	

=== Television ===
Year	Title	Role	Notes
2011	Underbelly: Razor	Fred Twiss	Episode: "Jerusalem Revisited"
2012	Tricky Business	Max Nugent	Episode: "Skyrockets in Flight"
2012–2014	Puberty Blues	David Vickers	Recurring role
2014	Soul Mates	Russell Crowe	2 episodes
2015	Australian Story	Himself	Episode: "The Meaning of Life"
2015	Comedy Bang Bang!	Grandson	1 episode
2015	Chevy	Taylor	Television film
2017	Fireside Chat With Esther	Patrick Junior	1 episode
2019	Diary of an Uber Driver	Clint	1 episode
2019–2020	Reckoning	Paxton Doyle	Main role
2020	Bloom	Luke	Main role (season 2)
2022	Irreverent	Cameron	Main role
2022	Christmas Ransom	Pete	Main role
2023	Pantheon	Dave Kim Jr.	2 episodes
