= Children's International Film Festival =

Children's International Film Festival has been conceptualised by The Film Studio FZ LLC, which is a company based out of Dubai Studio City. Children's International Film Festival, is commonly known as CIFF is the United Arab Emirates' first national level Children's Film Festival. CIFF over a period of time has attracted significant attention from schools, parents, families and filmmakers - locally, regionally and globally.

CIFF has had 4 editions held during the last week of April from the years 2014 to 2017.

== Activities ==
- Filmmaking workshops
- Filmmaking competition
- Film appreciation forums
- International Children Film Screenings
