= Becker Group =

Australian film and television company

- Formerly: R. A. Becker & Co.
- Industry: Film distribution
- Founded: 1965
- Founder: Russell Becker
- Defunct: 2007
- Successor: Prime Television
- Headquarters: Australia
- Key people: Richard Becker

Becker Group, formerly R. A. Becker & Co., was an Australian independent film and television distribution company founded by Russell Becker. It was established in 1965 and sold to Prime Television in 2007.

In 2008, a new company, Becker Film Group, was created by Richard Becker. In 2018, Becker formed a new film distribution company with Robert Slaviero, called R & R Films.

== History ==
Becker Group was established in 1965 as R. A. Becker & Co. by Russell Becker. In 1976, his son, Richard Becker took over the Australian unit of Fremantle International, and went on to expand into television production in 1977.

In 1987, the company's group was expanding into two subsidiaries, PRO Films, to produce films in the Los Angeles area and REP Distribution (stood for Richard Entertainment Partners) to distribute films locally in Australia. The group then formed Becker Entertainment in 1995 by combining the assets of Becker Group's Australian entertainment subsidiaries into a single unit.

In 2002 it took over Dendy Films and became known as Dendy/Becker; however, both continued to operate separately. It also owned OnSite Broadcasting, Moonlight Cinemas, and Dendy Cinemas, and had offices in New Zealand, Indonesia, Singapore and London.

In April 2006 Richard Becker, the managing director and son of Russell, announced he was stepping down and the chief operating officer and finance director Tim Keens would become the managing director on 1 July 2007. In June 2007 the group was sold to Prime Television. The Dendy chain was sold off to Icon Film Distribution around the same time.

== Becker Film Group ==
In 2008 Richard Becker started a new company called Becker Film Group, and was managing director of the company.

== R & R Films ==
In 2018, after Richard Becker had decided to "put Becker Films to the side", he asked Robert Slaviero, former CEO of Hoyts Distribution (which was sold to StudioCanal in 2012) to join him in a new venture, a distribution and consultancy company called R & R Films. The company was registered as R & R Films Pty Ltd in April 2018, and as of April 2022 is still operational. The focus of the new company is Australian films, to date distributing both feature films for the cinema, such as Black Water: Abyss, H Is for Happiness, and The Wishmas Tree; and DVDs and digital media (Angel of Mine).

== Films ==
Becker Group was involved in the production or distribution of the following films:

- Four Weddings and a Funeral (1994)
- Scream (1996)
- Two Hands (1999)
- The Blair Witch Project (1999)
- Emma (1996)
- FairyTale: A True Story (1997)
- Rabbit Proof Fence (2002)
- Margin Call (2011)
- Amélie (2001)
- Brassed Off (1997)
- Black Dog (1998)
- An American Werewolf in Paris (1997)
- Enigma (2001)
- Dungeons & Dragons (2000)
- Swingers (1996)
- Vera Drake
- A Simple Plan
- Primary Colors
- Super Size Me
- Wonder Boys (2000)
- Waking Ned Devine (1998)
- Candy (2006)
- Control
- Like Minds
- December Boys
- Feed
