= The Wishmas Tree =

2019 Australian animated adventure film

- Theatrical release poster
- Directed by: Ricard Cussó
- Written by: Ricard Cussó
- Story by: Peter Ivans
- Produced by: Kristen Souvlis; Nadine Bates
- Starring: Miranda Tapsell; Ross Noble; Kate Murphy; Ricard Cussó; Ryan Renshaw
- Edited by: Ahmad Halimi
- Music by: Ack Kinmonth
- Production company: Like a Photon Creative
- Distributed by: Universal Pictures; R & R Films (Australasia)
- Release dates: 5 October 2019 (Brisbane International Film Festival); 27 February 2020 (Australia)
- Running time: 90 minutes
- Country: Australia
- Language: English
- Box office: $874,049

The Wishmas Tree is a 2019 Australian animated adventure film written and directed by Ricard Cussó from a story by Peter Ivan. Financed by Screen Queensland and Screen Australia, it is the first film in Like a Photon Creative's The Tales from Sanctuary City franchise. The film stars Miranda Tapsell and Ross Noble. It had its world premiere at the Brisbane International Film Festival on 5 October 2019, and was released in Australian cinemas on 27 February 2020.

== Premise ==
A young possum's misguided wish for a white Wishmas freezes her entire hometown of Sanctuary City and threatens the lives of all who live there. Before the magical Wishmas Tree dies, she must undertake a journey into The Wild in order to reverse the damage she caused and save the city.

== Voice cast ==
- Miranda Tapsell as Kerry
- Ross Noble as Yarra
- Kate Murphy as Petra and Bernard the Drop Bear
- Ricard Cussó as Augustus
- Ryan Renshaw as Kerry and Petra's father

== Release and reception ==
The Wishmas Tree had its world premiere at the Brisbane International Film Festival on 5 October 2019. It had a limited release, and grossed $874,049 worldwide. It was distributed theatrically by R & R Films in Australia and New Zealand, and by various other companies internationally and on home media.

The film received generally negative reviews from critics, and on review aggregator Rotten Tomatoes the film holds an approval rating of 50% based on six reviews.
