= Odin's Eye Entertainment =

Australian entertainment company

- Type: Privately held company
- Industry: Film animation
- Founded: 2006
- Founder: Michael Favelle
- Headquarters: Sydney, Australia
- Owner: Michael Favelle

Odin's Eye Entertainment is an Australian entertainment company that variously focuses on the production, distribution, and international sales of feature films and television content, including both live-action and animated.

Founded in 2006, the company later established a related animation arm called Odin's Eye Animation.

== Management ==
Michael Favelle is the Sydney-based CEO and founder of Odin's Eye. Other company executives have included Derek Lui, senior vice president of operations and business development, Tianna Roberts, head of development and co-director of acquisitions, and Petrina Hull as head of development and director of acquisitions.
