= Screen Queensland =

- Formation: 1999; 27 years ago
- Founded at: Queensland
- Type: Governmental organisation
- Purpose: Promotion and development of Tasmanian screen industry
- Location: Queensland, Australia
- Chief Executive Officer: Jacqui Feeney
- Parent organisation: Queensland Government
- Website: screenqueensland.com.au

Screen Queensland is an agency of the Queensland Government which seeks to expand the production of movies, television series, and computer games within Queensland, Australia. It provides financial support to attract producers to use Queensland as a filming location or for other related services, such as post-production. It supports skills development of Queenslanders in the industry and the holding of film festivals and other events. It seeks to increase the involvement of Indigenous Australians in the industry. It often partners with Screen Australia which has similar objectives for Australia.

Screen Queensland owns Screen Queensland Studios, which are film studios located in Hemmant, Brisbane, available for rental by film makers. The Brisbane studio opened in 2019, and was followed by another set of film studios in Portsmith, Cairns in 2024. It also partners with Village Roadshow Studios at Oxenford on the Gold Coast.

While Screen Queensland has used its funding to attract major international productions, such as Pirates of the Caribbean: Dead Men Tell No Tales, to film in Queensland, the local industry believes that the funding would be better used to support local productions.

== See also ==
- Film and television financing in Australia
- List of film production companies
- List of television production companies
