= Screen Queensland Studios =

General information
- Type: Film and television studios
- Location: Brisbane, Gosport Street
- Coordinates: 27.4414535°S 153.1277494°E
- Inaugurated: 2019
- Owner: Screen Queensland

Screen Queensland Studios are a set of film studios operated by Screen Queensland in Queensland, Australia. They are available for rental by film makers.

The first film studios opened in 2019 in Hemmant, Brisbane. Another set of film studios opened in Portsmith, Cairns in 2024.

Screen Queensland also partners with Village Roadshow Studios at Oxenford on the Gold Coast.

== Description ==
Screen Queensland Studios studios are owned by Screen Queensland and are designed for low-mid budget domestic and international feature films, television drama series, subscription/streaming video on-demand shows, and television commercials.

== Productions ==
=== Film ===
Year	Title	Notes	Ref.
2020	Love and Monsters		
2020	Black Water: Abyss		
2021	You, Me and the Penguins		
2024	The Red		
2024	Sharko	Documentary film	
2025	Beast of War		
2025	Fear Below		
2026	Allen		
2026	Fing!		
2027	Zombie Plane		

=== Television ===
Year	Title	Notes	Ref.
2021	Young Rock	Season 1	
2022	Joe vs. Carole	Miniseries	
2024	Boy Swallows Universe	Miniseries	
2026	Deadloch	Season 2	
2026	Ina	Web series	
2026	Big Brother Australia	Season 17	

== Clients ==
Clients include:

- Paramount Pictures

== See also ==
- List of films shot in Brisbane
- List of films shot in Queensland
- List of films shot on the Gold Coast
- Village Roadshow Studios
- Queensland Film Corporation
- Screen Queensland
