= Maslow Entertainment =

Australian film distribution and production company

- Type: Privately held company
- Industry: Films
- Founded: 21 November 2020; 5 years ago
- Founder: Marc Wooldridge
- Headquarters: Sydney, Australia, Australia
- Key people: Marc Wooldridge (CEO and managing director)
- Products: The Pout Pout Fish; Kangaroo Island; Life Could Be a Dream
- Parent: Maslow Holdings
- Website: Official website

Maslow Entertainment is an Australian film distribution and production development company based in Sydney, founded in 2020 by Marc Wooldridge.

== History ==
Maslow Holdings, along with Maslow Entertainment, was founded in late 2020 by Marc Wooldridge, who had previously worked for 20th Century Fox International in various marketing and distribution roles. He was managing director of the Australasian cinema division for ten years.

The company was named after psychologist Abraham Maslow, whose theory of self-actualisation relates to Wooldridge's aims to enable creatives to reach their full potential both creatively and commercially. After the downturn caused by the COVID-19 pandemic, he hoped to be part of the revival of cinema in Australia.

== Description ==
Maslow Entertainment, which is also referred to simply as Maslow, is a film distribution and development company based in Sydney, New South Wales. Its main focus is distribution of new releases, particularly independent films, in Australian and New Zealand cinemas and on VOD. Up to 80 per cent of its releases are Australian films, which Wooldridge has called "emotionally and intellectually fulfilling".

Its production development arm is focused on early engagement with Australian filmmakers, and provides feedback on pitch and script feedback, as well as marketing advice and financial analysis. Maslow also provides consultancy services to investors and agencies.

As of June 2026, founder Marc Wooldridge is managing director.

=== Industry activities ===
Maslow Entertainment is a host company in the Matched Market Meetings section of the SPA Connect event held by Screen Producers Australia in April 2026 on the Gold Coast.

== Notable releases ==
By 2026, Maslow had released 40 films, including the 2022 hit horror film Talk to Me, the AACTA Award-winning political thriller The Correspondent, and the 2026 animated feature The Pout Pout Fish. It released the Australian family drama Kangaroo Island in 2025, and the 2026 drama Life Could Be a Dream.
