= Brisbane International Film Festival =

Film festival in Australia

Coordinates: 27°28′15.19″S 153°01′24.70″E

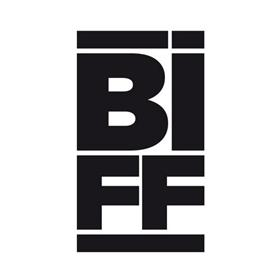
- Opening film: The Drover’s Wife: The Legend of Molly Johnson
- Closing film: Memoria
- Location: Brisbane, Queensland, Australia
- Predecessor: Brisbane Asia Pacific Film Festival (2014-2016)
- Founded: 1992
- Most recent: 2021
- Hosted by: Screen Queensland
- No. of films: 103 films (2021)
- Festival date: 21 to 31 October 2021
- Language: Various
- Website: biff.com.au

Current: 27th
- 28th 26th

The Brisbane International Film Festival (BIFF) is an annual film festival held in Brisbane, Australia. Organised by the Screen Culture unit at Screen Queensland, the festival has taken place since 1992, with the program including features, documentaries, shorts, indies, experimental efforts, retrospectives, late night thrillers, animation, and children's films. The festival has attracted more than 400,000 visitors across its history. The festival was replaced by the Brisbane Asia Pacific Film Festival from 2014-2016 but has been revived in 2017 while the Brisbane Asia Pacific Film Festival has ceased operations. In 2018, BIFF was held at Queensland Art Gallery | Gallery of Modern Art (QAGOMA), with screenings held across multiple venues.

The festival includes opening and closing night celebrations, special screenings, seminars, and awards ceremonies. In addition to promoting Australian content, the Brisbane International Film Festival (BIFF) features a diverse selection of international cinema and hosts question-and-answer sessions with filmmakers.

The 27th edition of the festival will be held from 21 to 31 October, 2021. 103 films including opening film Leah Purcell's The Drover’s Wife: The Legend Of Molly Johnson and closing film Memoria by Apichatpong Weerasethakul will be screened in the festival.

== History ==
In June 2017, the Queensland Government announced the festival’s revival through a partnership between Screen Queensland and Palace Cinemas. The revived event was scheduled for 17 August to 3 September 2017 and received $250,000 in state funding.

In June 2026, Screen Queensland announced that BIFF would not take place that year while it developed a new operating model. The agency planned to replace the licensing arrangement with a partnership-led approach and relaunch the festival in 2027.

== Events ==
In addition to the regular program, BIFF has synergies with Cine Sparks and the Queensland New Filmmakers Awards.

Cine Sparks, the Australian Film Festival for Young People was part of BIFF’s expansion in 2005, with a program of films, workshops and seminars for people under the age of 18. Cine Sparks is popular with school groups, with more than 10,000 students attending the various sessions. In 2011, Cine Sparks took place in October, as a prelude to BIFF.

The Queensland New Filmmakers Awards (QNFA) is the biggest industry sponsored new filmmaker competition in the country, recognising and encouraging the achievements of emerging Queensland filmmakers. The competition is aimed at rewarding the creative talents of Queensland short filmmakers, with 2011 marking its 25th year.

== Awards ==
BIFFDOCS — In 2011 the festival established BIFFDOCS, Australia's richest prize for documentary filmmakers. The BIFFDOCS competition rewards excellence in documentary production - particularly films that exhibit the ability to surprise, entertain, provoke and disturb. The inaugural BIFFDOCS award went to Arirang, by one of South Koreas most celebrated filmmakers, 'Kim Ki-duk.

Audience Award — Attendees at the festival are asked to vote after each screening, with the results shaping the festival's Audience award.

Jury Awards — The festival has also hosted international juries, who judge three awards: The FIPRESCI Award, the NETPAC Award and the Interfaith Award for Promoting Humanitarian Values.

Chauvel Award — From 1992 until 2011, the festival acknowledged a contributor to Australian cinema through the Chauvel Award, named in honour of filmmakers Charles Chauvel and his wife Elsa Chauvel. One of the last awards at this venue was awarded posthumously to Heath Ledger in 2008, before being revived by the Gold Coast Film Festival in 2016, where it is now awarded annually.

== See also ==
- List of festivals in Brisbane
- List of festivals in Australia
