= AACTA Award for Best Indie Film =

Australian film award

Best Indie Film AACTA Award
- Awarded for: Best Australian indie film of the year
- Country: Australia
- Presented by: Australian Academy of Cinema and Television Arts (AACTA)
- First award: 2019; 7 years ago
- Currently held by: Lesbian Space Princess (2025)
- Website: www.aacta.org/aacta-awards/overview/

The AACTA Award for Best Indie Film is an award presented by the Australian Academy of Cinema and Television Arts (AACTA) since 2018.

The award is presented at the annual AACTA Awards, which hand out accolades for achievements in feature film, television, documentaries and short films. Since 2024 the awards have been held at the Gold Coast, Queensland.

== History ==
The establishment of the AACTA Award for Best Indie Film was announced on 1 May 2018. The inaugural award was won by Jirga, directed by Benjamin Gilmour.

== Eligibility ==
The intention of the award is to allow "a pathway into competition for a greater number of films from filmmakers with diverse backgrounds (gender, sexual and cultural diversity), as well as films from emerging filmmakers". Only films with a budget of under A$2 million are eligible.

== Winners and nominees ==
=== 2018 ===
The winner of the inaugural award in 2018, in the 8th AACTA Awards:

- Jirga, directed by Benjamin Gilmour

Other films nominated were:

- Brothers' Nest (Clayton Jacobson)
- The Second (Mairi Cameron)
- Strange Colours (Alena Lodkina)
- West of Sunshine (Jason Raftopoulos)

=== 2019 ===
The winner of the 2019 award, in the 9th AACTA Awards:

- Buoyancy, directed by Rodd Rathjen

Other films nominated were:

- Acute Misfortune (Thomas M. Wright)
- Book Week (Heath Davis)
- Emu Runner (Imogen Thomas)
- Sequin in a Blue Room (Samuel Van Grinsven)

=== 2020 ===
The winner of the 2020 award, in the 10th AACTA Awards:

- Standing Up for Sunny (Steve Vidler)

Other nominations:

- A Boy Called Sailboat (Cameron Nugent)
- Hot Mess (Lucy Coleman (director))
- Koko: A Red Dog Story (Dominic Pearce)
- A Lion Returns (Serhat Caradee)
- Unsound (Ian Watson)

=== 2021 ===
The winner of the 2021 award, in the 11th AACTA Awards:

- Ellie & Abbie (& Ellie's Dead Aunt) (Monica Zanetti)

Other films nominated were:

- Disclosure (Michael Bentham)
- Lone Wolf (Jonathan Ogilvie)
- Moon Rock for Monday (Kurt Martin)
- My First Summer (Katie Found)
- Under My Skin (David O'Donnell)

=== 2022 ===
The winner of the 2022 award, in the 12th AACTA Awards:

- A Stitch in Time, directed by Sasha Hadden

Other films nominated were:

- Akoni (Genna Chanelle Hayes)
- Darklands (Scott Major)
- Lonesome (Craig Boreham)
- Pieces (Martin Wilson)
- Smoke Between Trees (Michael Joy)

=== 2023 ===
The winner of the award celebrating the best films released in 2023 in the 13th AACTA Awards, announced in February 2024:

- Limbo, directed by Ivan Sen

Other films nominated were:

- The Survival of Kindness (Rolf de Heer)
- A Savage Christmas (Madeleine Dyer)
- Monolith (Matt Vesely)
- The Rooster (Mark Leonard Winter)
- Streets of Colour (Ronnie S. Riskalla)

=== 2024 ===
The winner of the award celebrating the best films released in 2024 in the 14th AACTA Awards, announced in February 2025:

- Birdeater, directed by Jack CLark and Jim Weir

Other films nominated were:

- Before Dawn (Jordon Prince-Wright)
- Christmess (Heath Davis)
- Just A Farmer (Simon Lyndon)
- The Emu War (Lisa Fineberg)
- You'll Never Find Me (Indianna Bell, Josiah Allen)

=== 2025 ===
The winner of the award celebrating the best films released in 2025 in the 15th AACTA Awards, announced in February 2026:

- Lesbian Space Princess, directed by Emma Hough Hobbs and Leela Varghese

Other films nominated were:

- Carmen & Bolude (Michela Carattini)
- Fwends (Sophie Somerville)
- It Will Find You (Enzo Tedeschi and Chris Broadbent)
- Magic Beach (Robert Connolly)
- With or Without You (Su Armstrong and Carolyn Johnson)
