= Black lung =

Black lung may refer to:

- Black lung, or black lung disease, the common name for coalworker's pneumoconiosis, a disease caused by long-term exposure to coal dust
- Black Lung, nickname of Red Dead Redemption 2 protagonist Arthur Morgan
- Black Lung, a theatre company founded by Thomas M. Wright and Thomas Henning
- Black Lung, also known as Snog, an Australian band
- "Black Lung," a song by folk-bluegrass band The Dead South from their 2019 album Sugar & Joy
- "Black Lung," a song by punk band Rancid from the album Life Won't Wait
- Black Lungs, a side project of Alexisonfire guitarist Wade MacNeil
- "Black Lungs," a song by Architects from their 2021 album For Those That Wish to Exist
