= Daniel Henshall =

Australian actor (born 1982)

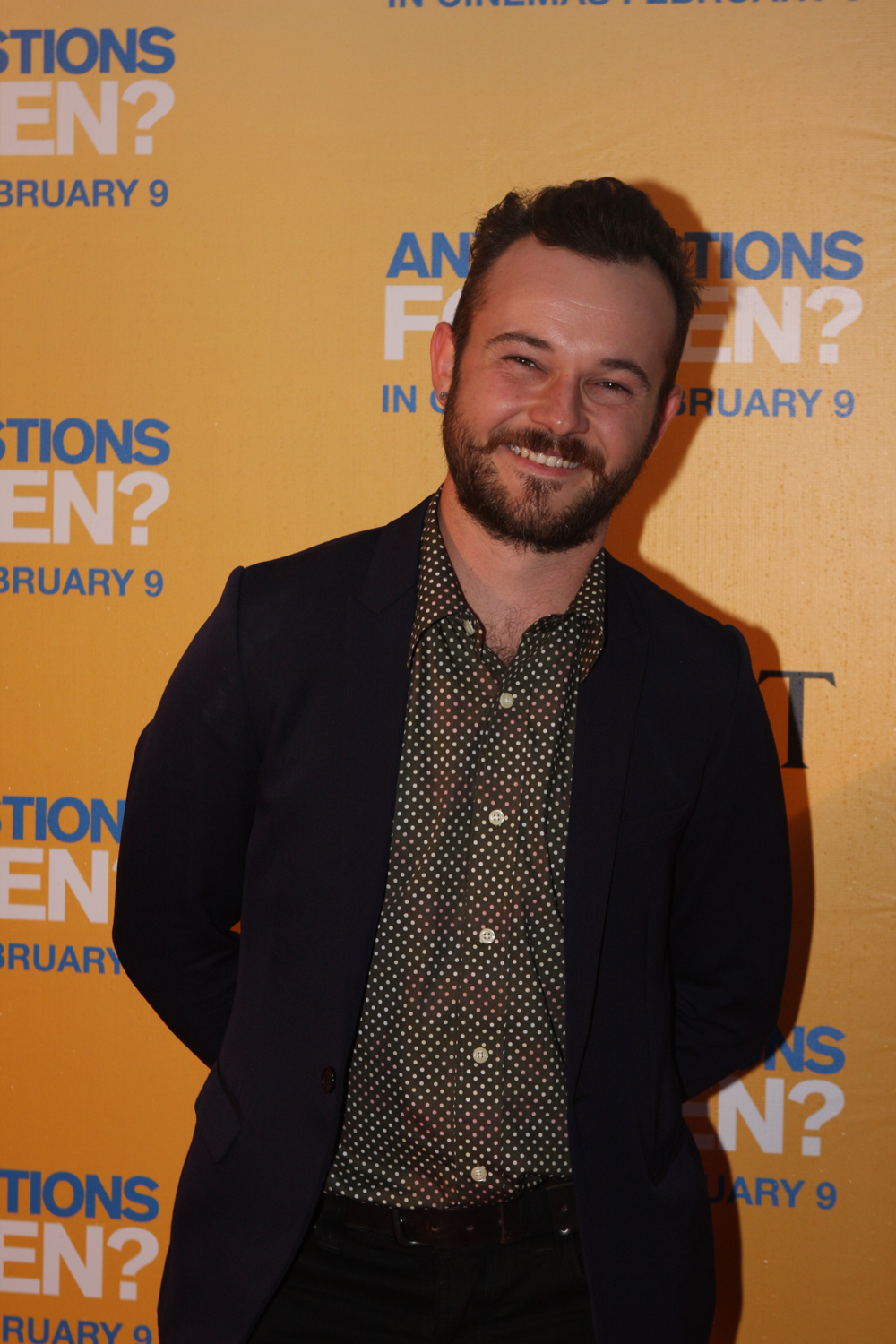
- Henshall in February 2012
- Born: Daniel Edwin Henshall; 1982 or 1983 (age 43–44); Sydney, New South Wales, Australia
- Occupation: Actor
- Years active: 2006–present

Daniel Edwin Henshall (born 1982) is an Australian actor. Following his film debut in Snowtown (2011), for which he won the AACTA Award for Best Actor in a Leading Role, Henshall has appeared in films such as The Babadook (2014), Okja (2017), Acute Misfortune (2018), Catch the Fair One (2021) and Mickey 17 (2025).

== Early life and education ==
Daniel Henshall was born and raised in Sydney, Australia.

He graduated from the full time acting program at Actors Centre Australia in 2006.

== Career ==
Henshall's first major role was on the short lived BBC soap Out of the Blue (2008), where he played happy go lucky, Adam 'Ado' O'Donnell.

He won the AACTA Award for Best Actor in a Leading Role for his debut feature film performance as real life serial killer, John Bunting, in Justin Kurzel's Snowtown (2011). Indiewire named it one of the best performances of 2012. Snowtown was selected to play at Critics' Week during the Cannes Film Festival where it was awarded two special mention prizes.

Henshall originated the role of Dan Oldfield in the initial sell-out seasons of The Secret River (2013) written by Andrew Bovell, commissioned by Cate Blanchett and Andrew Upton for The Sydney Theatre Company.

For four seasons he played co-lead, whaler spy Caleb Brewster, alongside Jamie Bell, Heather Lind and Seth Numrich in the AMC revolutionary war series Turn: Washington's Spies (2014–2017).

Writer/Director Jennifer Kent cast him as Nurse Robbie, opposite Essie Davis, in the universally praised, modern cult classic, The Babadook (2014). The Babadook had its world premiere at the 2014 Sundance Film Festival.

In the DreamWorks live-action version of the Ghost in the Shell (2017) he played Skinny Man, an AI corrupted vigilante, opposite Scarlett Johansson. Johansson and Henshall battle it out in a recreation of the famous water fight and interrogation scenes of the original 1995 Anime of the same name.

Oscar-winning Director Bong Joon-ho cast him as Blonde, animal rights-activist and boyfriend of Silver, alongside Paul Dano, Steven Yeun, Lily Collins and Devon Bostick, in the action-adventure feature film Okja (2017). Okja competed for the Palme d'or in Official Competition at the Cannes Film Festival.

He played white supremacist Slayer, opposite Jamie Bell, Vera Farmiga and Bill Camp, in Skin (2018), based on the life of Bryon Widner and work of Daryle Lamont Jenkins. Skin had its world premiere at the Toronto Film Festival.

Henshall was nominated for the Film Critics Circle of Australia and Australian Film Critics Association Awards for Best Actor for his performance as Archibald Prize-winning artist Adam Cullen in Acute Misfortune (2019), opposite Toby Wallace and directed by Thomas M. Wright. Acute Misfortune was named best Australian film of 2019 by The Guardian.

He played murder suspect Leonard Patz, opposite Chris Evans and Cherry Jones, in the Apple TV+ thriller Defending Jacob (2020), directed by Morten Tyldum.

He was Daryl Dunn, criminal on the run turned Santa, in the Stan family Christmas comedy, A Sunburnt Christmas (2020), directed by Christiaan Van Vuuren.

Next Henshall played grieving brother turned vigilante, Simon Burton, in the Netflix limited series Clickbait (2021), opposite Zoe Kazan, Adrian Grenier and Phoenix Raei.

In the film Catch the Fair One (2021) directed by Josef Kubota Wladyka, he plays Bobby, heir to a human trafficking syndicate, opposite Kali Reis and Kevin Dunn. Catch the Fair One premiered at the Tribeca Film Festival where it won the Audience Award.

Henshall has a cameo in the third and final season of the cult FX series Mr Inbetween (2022), opposite creator Scott Ryan and directed by Nash Edgerton.

He was nominated for a AACTA Award for Best Guest or Supporting Actor in a Television Drama for his work as Patrick, the fraudulent son of a bankrupt mining family, opposite Mark Coles Smith in Mystery Road: Origin (2022), directed by Dylan River.

In The Royal Hotel (2023), directed by Kitty Green, he plays barfly and menace, Dolly, opposite Julia Garner, Jessica Henwick and Hugo Weaving. The Royal Hotel had its world premiere at the 2023 Telluride Film Festival.

Henshall was nominated for the 2025 AACTA Award for Best Actor in a Leading Role for his work as Joe, in the 2024 Warner Bros film How to Make Gravy (an adaptation of the iconic Australian song of the same name by singer-songwriter Paul Kelly), opposite Hugo Weaving, Agathe Rousselle and Damon Herriman, and directed by Nick Waterman.

In the Warner Bros space odyssey Mickey 17, visionary director Bong Joon-Ho once again cast him, this time as bald man-servant and believer, Preston, opposite Mark Ruffalo, Robert Pattinson and Naomi Ackie.

In the multi-generational family drama Jimpa, directed by Sophie Hyde, Daniel plays Harry opposite Olivia Colman, Aud Mason-Hyde and John Lithgow. Jimpa had its world premiere at the 2025 Sundance Film Festival, where it was the opening night film.

Henshall was nominated twice for the 2026 AACTA Award for Best Guest or Supporting Actor in a Television Drama. First, for his work as Bill McFarlane in the award-winning ABC Australia series The Newsreader, opposite Anna Torv and directed by Emma Freeman, and second, for his work as Nigel, in the ABC Australia hit The Family Next Door also directed by Emma Freeman and opposite Ming-Zhu Hii and Teresa Palmer. He won for his role in the The Newsreader.

Daniel was also nominated for the 2026 Logie Award for Best Supporting Actor in a Drama for his work as Nigel in The Family Next Door.

He played Uncle Vanya in the Melbourne Theatre Company production of Uncle Vanya (2026), adapted by Joanna Murray-Smith and directed by the company's Artistic Director Anne-Louise Sarks.

Next he will be seen as Donald 'Donnie' Reid in the Apple TV+ limited series Last Seen directed by Christian Schwochow and opposite Patrick Brammall, Maxine Peake and Brendan Cowell.

== Filmography ==
=== Film ===
Year	Title	Role	Notes
2011	Snowtown	John Bunting	
2012	Not Suitable for Children	Dave	
2012	Any Questions for Ben?	Nick	
2013	These Final Hours	Freddy	
2014	The Babadook	Robbie	
2014	Fell	Luke	
2017	Ghost in the Shell	Skinny Man	
2017	Okja	Blonde	
2019	Acute Misfortune	Adam Cullen	
2019	Skin	Slayer	
2020	Measure for Measure	Lukey	
2020	A Sunburnt Christmas	Daryl Dun	
2021	Catch the Fair One	Bobby	
2023	The Royal Hotel	Dolly	
2024	How to Make Gravy	Joe	
2025	Jimpa	Harry	
2025	Mickey 17	Preston	

=== Television ===
Year	Title	Role	Notes	Ref
2007	All Saints	Tim Downly	Episode: "The Pain of It All "	
2008	Out of the Blue	Adam 'Ado' O'Donnell	Main cast	
2010	Rescue Special Ops	Trevor Slezack	Episode: "Street Legal"	
2012	Rake	Clown	Episode: "R vs Mohammed"	
2012	Devil's Dust	Jock	Ensemble	
2013	Mr & Mrs Murder	Gregor Cheresniak	Episode: "Atlas Drugged"	
2015	The Beautiful Lie	Kingsley Faraday	Main cast	
2014–2017	Turn: Washington's Spies	Caleb Brewster	Main cast	
2019	Lambs of God	Barnaby	Main Cast	
2019	Bloom	Griffo	Main Cast	
2020	Defending Jacob	Leonard Patz	Ensemble	
2021	Clickbait	Simon Burton	Episode: "The Brother"	
2021	Fires	Kip	Ensemble	
2021	Mr Inbetween	Kenny	Cameo	
2022	Mystery Road: Origin	Patrick	Main Cast	
2023	RFDS	Glen	Episode 2.6	
2025	The Newsreader	Bill McFarlane	Main Cast	
2025	The Family Next Door	Nigel	TV series	
2026	Dear Life	Jack	TV series	
2026	Last Seen	Donald Reid	Apple TV+ series	
2026	Wentworth: Halfway Home	Vince	TV series	

== Theatre ==
Year	Title	Role	Notes
2013	The Secret River	Dan Oldfield	Sydney Theatre Company
2026	Uncle Vanya	Vanya	Melbourne Theatre Company

== Awards ==
Year	Work	Award	Category	Result
2011	Snowtown	Film Critics Circle of Australia Awards	Best Actor	Won
2011	Snowtown	Australian Film Critics Association Awards	Best Actor	Won
2011	Snowtown	Marrakech International Film Festival	Best Actor	Won
2012	Snowtown	AACTA Awards	AACTA Award for Best Actor in a Leading Role	Won
2019	Acute Misfortune	Australian Film Critics Association Awards	Best Actor	Nominated
2019	Acute Misfortune	Film Critics Circle of Australia Awards	Best Actor	Nominated
2022	Mystery Road: Origin	AACTA Awards	Best Guest or Supporting Actor in a Television Drama	Nominated
2023	Mystery Road: Origin	Equity Ensemble Awards	Outstanding Performance by an Ensemble in a Drama Series	Won
2025	How to Make Gravy	AACTA Awards	Best Actor in a Leading Role	Nominated
2025	How to Make Gravy	Equity Ensemble Awards	Outstanding Performance by an Ensemble in a Telemovie	Won
2026	The Newsreader	AACTA Awards	Best Guest or Supporting Actor in a Television Drama	Won
2026	The Family Next Door	AACTA Awards	Best Guest or Supporting Actor in a Television Drama	Nominated
2026	The Family Next Door	Equity Ensemble Awards	Outstanding Performance by an Ensemble in a Drama Series	Won
2026	The Family Next Door	Logie Awards	Best Supporting Actor in a Drama	Nominated
