= Acute Misfortune =

2018 Australian drama film about artist Adam Cullen, made by Thomas M. Wright

- Film poster
- Directed by: Thomas M. Wright
- Written by: Erik Jensen; Thomas M. Wright
- Based on: Biography of artist Adam Cullen by Erik Jensen
- Produced by: Thomas M. Wright, Virginia Kay, Jamie Houge, Liz Kearney
- Starring: Daniel Henshall; Toby Wallace; Max Cullen; Genevieve Lemon; Gillian Jones
- Cinematography: Germain McMicking; Stefan Duscio
- Edited by: Luca Cappelli
- Music by: Evelyn Ida Morris
- Production company: Arenamedia
- Release date: August 4, 2018 (Melbourne International Film Festival)
- Running time: 90 minutes
- Country: Australia
- Language: English

Acute Misfortune is a 2018 Australian drama film co-written, directed and produced by Thomas M. Wright. The story is based on Sydney journalist Erik Jensen's biography of Australian artist Adam Cullen, who died at the age of 46. The film stars Daniel Henshall as Cullen and Toby Wallace as Jensen.

== Plot ==
This film tells part of the story of the life of deeply troubled, award-winning artist Adam Cullen (1965–2012), specifically his relationship with his biographer, Erik Jensen, as it descends into a dependent and abusive relationship.

== Themes ==
The focus of the film is on the complex relationship between the artist and his biographer, and Wright said that he had wanted to make the film "full of beauty, full of possibility...[with] A lightness, an accessibility and an honesty". He rejects the bio-pic moniker, and says that he did not set out to make a biography, nor a "faithful transcription of the book"; he wanted to question the book.

== Production ==
The film was based on Jensen's 2015 biography of Cullen, Acute Misfortune: The Life and Death of Adam Cullen. The book won the 2015 Nib Literary Award as well as being shortlisted for the Walkley Book Award and the Victorian Premier's Prize for Nonfiction. Wright co-wrote the screenplay with Jensen.

Authenticity was important to Wright: Henshall lost 22 kilograms (49 lb) during the making of the film, wore Cullen's clothes, painted with his paints and paintbrushes, worked closely with Cullen's assistant, and met many of Cullen's friends, caregivers, former partners and lawyers.

Wright co-produced the film with Virginia Kay, Jamie Houge and Liz Kearney. Luca Capelli edited the film, Germain McMicking and Stefan Duscio were the directors of photography, Leah Popple production designer and Robert Connolly executive producer. Evelyn Ida Morris wrote the score.

== Release ==
The film premiered at the Melbourne International Film Festival (MIFF) in August 2018, and played at the Adelaide Film Festival in October that year. It was also shown at the 2018 Brisbane International Film Festival and the 2019 Edinburgh International Film Festival.

It was released in Australian cinemas in May 2019, starting with Q&A sessions at selected cinemas.

== Reception ==
Acute Misfortune received a five-star review and was named the best Australian film of 2019 by The Guardian. It was later named one of The Guardian's "10 Best Australian Films of the decade 2010–2020" The Hollywood Reporter called Acute Misfortune "one of the year's most striking and accomplished directorial debuts".

Screen Daily called it an "overlooked gem" in their list of the Best Films of 2018.

== Cast ==
- Daniel Henshall as Adam Cullen
- Toby Wallace as Erik Jensen
- Gillian Jones as Ruth Marr
- Genevieve Lemon as Carmel Cullen
- Max Cullen as Kevin Cullen
- Christopher Clift as the grieving father
- Daniel Aguiar as Portuguese man
- James Bell as Ben
- Rowland Holmes as a policeman
- Steve Mouzakis as Jim
- Joanne Samuel as the magistrate
- Jane Townsend as Erik’s Mother

== Awards and nominations ==
Acute Misfortune was given a "Notable mention" (along with Sweet Country) in The Monthly Awards 2018

It received The Age Critics' Prize at Melbourne International Film Festival after its premiere, and later in the year was nominated for the 2019 AACTA Award for Best Indie Film in the 9th AACTA Awards.

Wright was nominated in the Best Director (Feature Film) category for Acute Misfortune at the 2020 Australian Directors' Guild Awards.

For his work, Henshall was nominated for the 2019 Film Critics Circle of Australia Award for Best Actor and 2020 Australian Film Critics Association Award for Best Actor.

The score, by Evelyn Ida Morris, was nominated for best soundtrack at the 2018 ARIA Music Awards.
