= Toby Wallace =

British-born Australian actor (born 1995)

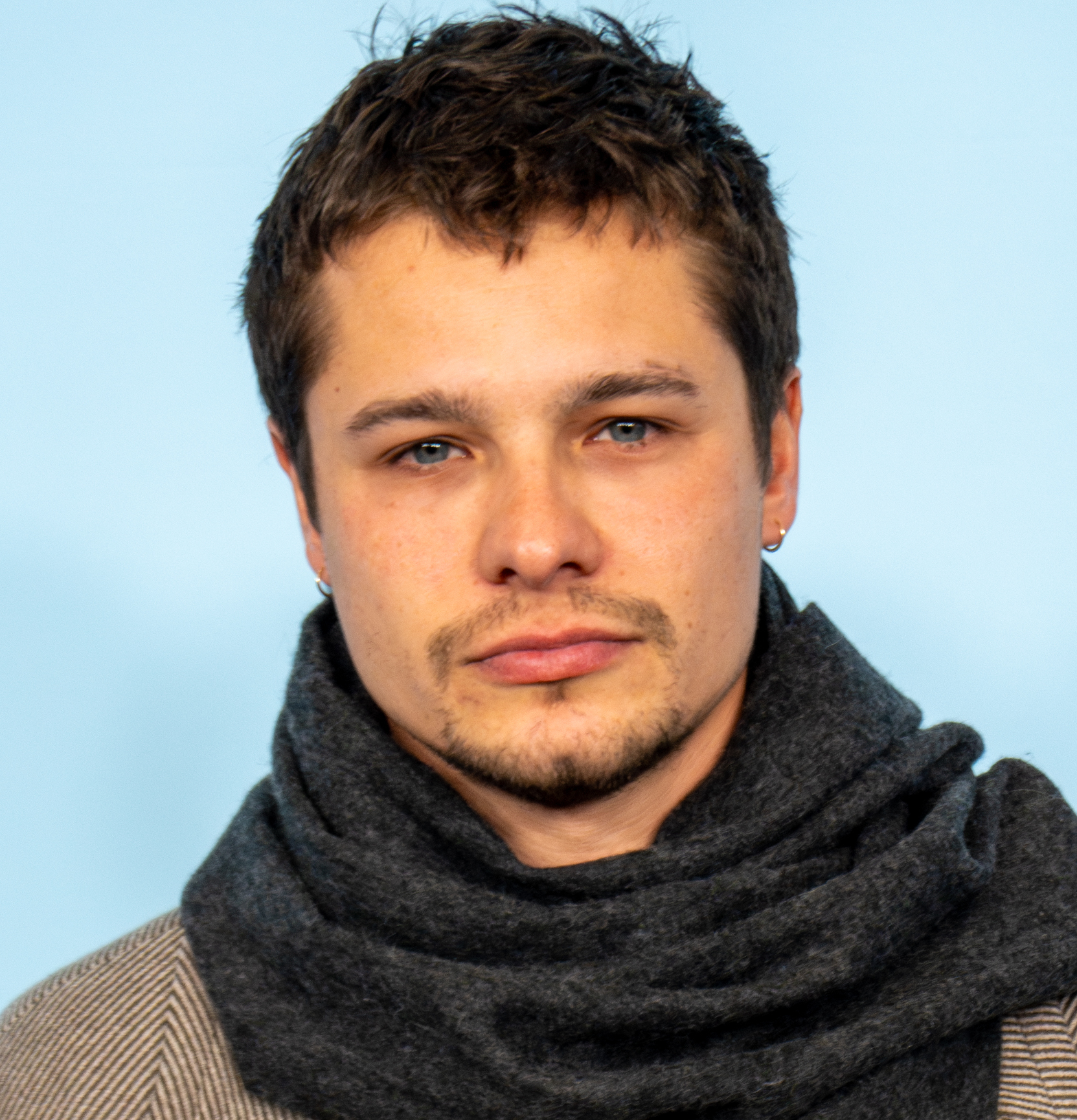
- Wallace in 2025
- Born: 6 June 1995 (age 31); Westminster, London, England
- Citizenship: Australia; United Kingdom
- Occupation: Actor
- Years active: 2009–present

Toby Wallace (born 6 June 1995) is a British-born Australian actor, known for his role in Babyteeth (2019), for which he won the Marcello Mastroianni Award at the 2019 Venice Film Festival and the AACTA for Best Actor in a Leading Role in 2020.

== Early life and education ==
Wallace was born in the United Kingdom on 6 June 1995, living there until he was aged eight. After the family moved to Australia, he went to Jells Park Primary School in the Melbourne suburb of Wheelers Hill until Year 6, before transferring to Caulfield Grammar School, where he trained in drama and theatre.

== Career ==
Wallace's first appearance in a feature film, aged 13, was in Lucky Country, a 2009 film by Australian filmmaker Kriv Stenders. It was for this role that he was nominated for an Australian Film Institute Award for Best Young Actor.

In 2012, Wallace had a role in the TV movie Underbelly Files: The Man Who Got Away. In 2012, Wallace played a month-long guest role in the long-running TV series Neighbours.

Wallace played the young Michael Hutchence in the miniseries about the rock band INXS, called INXS: Never Tear Us Apart, released in 2014.

Wallace played a leading role in the Australian feature Acute Misfortune, starring Daniel Henshall as the artist Adam Cullen and Wallace as his biographer, and was in the TV miniseries Romper Stomper, both released in 2018.

Wallace plays Steve Jones of the Sex Pistols, in the 2022 TV series Pistol, directed by Danny Boyle.

In February 2025, it was announced that Wallace had joined the third season of the HBO series Euphoria.

In December 2025, it was announced that Wallace was cast in an undisclosed regular role in the upcoming live-action television adaptation of the Assassin's Creed video game series.

== Filmography ==
=== Film ===
Year	Title	Role(s)	Notes
2009	Lucky Country (aka Dark Frontier)	Tom	
2011	Surviving Georgia	Albie	
2013	Return to Nim's Island	Edmund	
2013	Galore	Danny	
2013	Grandad		
2013	A Great Man	Dusty	Short film
2013	The Last Time I Saw Richard	Jonah	Short film
2013	The Turning	Blakey	
2016	Boys in the Trees	Corey	
2016	St Elmo	Joshua	Short film
2017	Smashed	Dean	Short film
2017	Tangles and Knots	Taylor	Short film
2018	Acute Misfortune	Erik Jensen	
2018	Entrenched	Thomas	Short film
2018	Nursery Rhymes	Metalhead Boy	Short film
2019	Babyteeth	Moses	
2023	Finestkind	Charlie Eldridge	
2023	The Royal Hotel	Matty	
2023	The Bikeriders	The Kid	
2024	Inside	Adrian Murfett	
2024	Eden	Robert Phillipson	
2025	Last Days	Chandler	
2026	Closing Night	Theo	Completed

=== Television ===
Year	Title	Role(s)	Notes
2011	Underbelly Files: The Man Who Got Away	David Junior	TV movie
2012	Neighbours	Corey O'Donaghue	TV series
2014	It's a Date	Nathan	TV series
2014	Parer's War	Lieutenant Ron 'Judy' Garland	TV movie
2014	INXS: Never Tear Us Apart	Young Michael	TV movie
2018	Romper Stomper	Kane	TV series
2019	The Society	Campbell Eliot	TV series
2022	Pistol	Steve Jones	Miniseries
2026	Euphoria	Wayne	TV series
TBA	Assassin's Creed		TV series

== Recognition ==
Wallace was nominated for an AFI Award for Best Young Actor in Lucky Country.

He won the Marcello Mastroianni Award at the 2019 Venice Film Festival and the AACTA for Best Actor in a Leading Role in 2020, for his role in Babyteeth.
