= David O'Donnell =

David O'Donnell may refer to:

- David O'Donnell (actor-director) (born 1956), New Zealand actor and theatre director
- David O'Donnell (filmmaker), Australian-born film writer, director and producer
- David O'Donnell (rugby league) (born 1968), Australian rugby league footballer
