= Evelyn Morris =

Evelyn Ida Morris
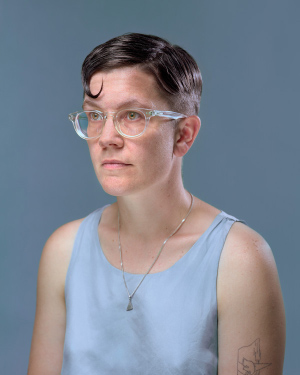
- Morris in 2018

Background information
- Occupation: singer-songwriter
- Years active: 2003–present

Evelyn Ida Morris, also known as Pikelet, is a musician from the outer suburbs of Melbourne, Australia. Morris is non-binary and uses they/them pronouns.

They released four albums; Pikelet (2007), Stem (2010), Calluses (2013) and Tronc (2016).

== Career ==
Morris began playing piano from a young age.

Their music career began as a hardcore/punk-obsessed drummer, performing in many bands but mostly including Baseball and True Radical Miracle.

In 2003 Morris switched from drum kit to a mix of instruments and a loop pedal for recordings as Pikelet. The project employs delay pedals, piano accordion, guitar, drums, and other forms of percussion.

The name "Pikelet" comes from Evelyn's mother, who used to spoil her kids with pikelets (Australian pancake) when she was a little short of money. "She always had eggs, she always had flour and powdered milk in the cupboard, so she would just throw together pikelets", Evelyn told Mess+Noise in 2007. "It was a really big deal for me, but I found out later that it was just what she did when she had nothing else".

Pikelet released their self-titled album in 2007. They have toured throughout Australia, Europe and New Zealand playing with acts including Frida Hyvönen, Jens Lekman, Beirut, Camera Obscura, Darren Hanlon, The Blow, Sufjan Stevens, Broadcast and Ned Collette.

From 2010 Pikelet has frequently referred to a band consisting of Morris, Shags Chamberlain, Tarquin Manek and Matthew Cox. Later releases have been described as "deep psych pop", and songs have been written collaboratively.

In April 2018, Morris issued a predominantly wordless, piano-based self-titled album.

In August 2018, Morris provided the score for the Australian film Acute Misfortune, an adaptation of the biography of Adam Cullen by Erik Jensen, directed by Thomas M. Wright.

On 18 March 2019, Morris released the final Pikelet release, the EP Goodbye.

== Discography ==
=== Studio albums ===
List of studio albums, with selected details
Title	Album details
Pikelet	Released: May 2007; Label: Chapter Music (CH59); Formats: CD, digital download
Stem	Released: January 2010; Label: Love + Mercy, Chapter Music (BRIAR022); Formats: CD, digital download
Calluses	Released: 16 August 2013; Label: Chapter Music (CH111); Formats: CD, LP, digital download
Tronc	Released: 1 May 2016; Label: Chapter Music (CH142); Formats: CD, digital download
Evelyn Ida Morris (as Evelyn Ida Morris)	Released: 20 April 2018; Label: Milk! Records (MILK029); Formats: CD, LP, digital download, streaming

=== Soundtracks ===
List of studio albums, with selected details
Title	Album details
Acute Misfortune (as Evelyn Ida Morris)	Released: 3 August 2018; Label: Arenamedia / ABC Music; Formats: CD, digital download, streaming

=== Extended plays ===
List of studio albums, with selected details
Title	EP details
Pre-Flight Jitters	Released: 2008; Label: Sabbatical (SBB008); Formats: CD
Not So Still	Released: 2009; Label: Special Award (SA002); Formats: CD, digital download
Goodbye	Released: 18 March 2019; Label: Babyrace Records (BR-002); Formats: Cassette, digital download, streaming

== Awards and nominations ==
=== ARIA Music Awards ===
The ARIA Music Awards is an annual awards ceremony that recognises excellence, innovation, and achievement across all genres of Australian music. They commenced in 1987.

Year	Nominee / work	Award	Result	Ref.
2018	Acute Misfortune (Original Soundtrack)	Best Original Soundtrack, Cast or Show Album	Nominated	

=== Australian Music Prize ===
The Australian Music Prize (the AMP) is an annual award of $30,000 given to an Australian band or solo artist in recognition of the merit of an album released during the year of award. The commenced in 2005.

Year	Nominee / work	Award	Result
2010	Stem	Australian Music Prize	Nominated

=== Music Victoria Awards ===
The Music Victoria Awards are an annual awards night celebrating Victorian music. They commenced in 2006.

Year	Nominee / work	Award	Result	Ref.
2013	Evelyn Morris	Best Female	Nominated	
2014	Evelyn Morris	Best Experimental/Avant-Garde Act	Won	
2022	Evelyn Morris	Arts Access Amplify Award (for Deaf and Disabled acts)	Won	

=== National Live Music Awards ===
The National Live Music Awards (NLMAs) are a broad recognition of Australia's diverse live industry, celebrating the success of the Australian live scene. The awards commenced in 2016.

Year	Nominee / work	Award	Result
2016	themselves	Industry Achievement	Nominated
