= Jirga (film) =

2018 film

- Film poster
- Directed by: Benjamin Gilmour
- Written by: Benjamin Gilmour
- Produced by: John Maynard; Amirshah Talash
- Starring: Sam Smith
- Cinematography: Benjamin Gilmour
- Edited by: Nikki Stevens
- Music by: AJ True
- Production company: Felix Media
- Release date: 27 September 2018
- Running time: 78 minutes
- Country: Australia
- Languages: Pashto, English
- Box office: $110,056

Jirga (Pashto: جرګه, meaning "meeting") is a 2018 Australian drama film written and directed by Benjamin Gilmour and produced by John Maynard. It stars Sam Smith as an Australian former soldier returning to Afghanistan to seek forgiveness from the family of a man he killed while serving in the war. The film was shot under extreme circumstances, in dangerous locations and with assistance from the local people of Afghanistan. Deemed too politically divisive to be produced in Pakistan, the film moved production at the last minute to Afghanistan and shot in one of the most dangerous regions in the world, Kandahar Province.

Gilmour sought to create a film which showed the beauty of the Afghan country and people as well as highlight the detrimental impact of the war in Afghanistan on Western and Afghan people. He also wanted to create a film in which the line between truth and fiction was blurred. Gilmour stated he wished to "make an audience feel like they're not quite sure if they're watching a documentary or a drama." It was selected as the Australian entry for the Best Foreign Language Film at the 91st Academy Awards, but it was not nominated.

== Plot ==
The Australian army sends a helicopter raid to a small village called Ghazi Ghar in Afghanistan in search of hidden Taliban fighters. Men in the village seeking to protect their families exchange gunfire with the soldiers. During the raid a soldier named Mike shoots and kills an unarmed man who steps into the doorway of his home. The man's wife and children pull him back into the house.

Three years later Mike returns to Afghanistan in search of the family in order to ask for forgiveness and takes with him a large sum of money as recompense. He lands in Kabul where he comes in contact with a man who had previously arranged to transport him to the family's village. This man now refuses to help him, telling Mike it is too dangerous and that he should go back to Australia. Mike hides in an Afghan curiosity shop to escape from a commotion in the street where he purchases a guitar under pressure from the owner.

Mike asks a hotel owner to call a taxi driver to take him to Ghazi Ghar which is in Kandahar Province. The hotel owner refuses as Kandahar is Taliban territory. He says he can arrange for a driver to take him as far south as the Band-e-Amir lake but that is all. While at the lake, Mike tries to convince the taxi driver to take him the rest of the way to Kandahar, offering him a lot of money. The taxi driver refuses and argues back with Mike. Neither man speaks the other's language and so the argument simply stops. That night Mike plays his guitar. The taxi driver sings a Pashtun song and Mike teaches him to sing the notes which correspond to the guitar strings.

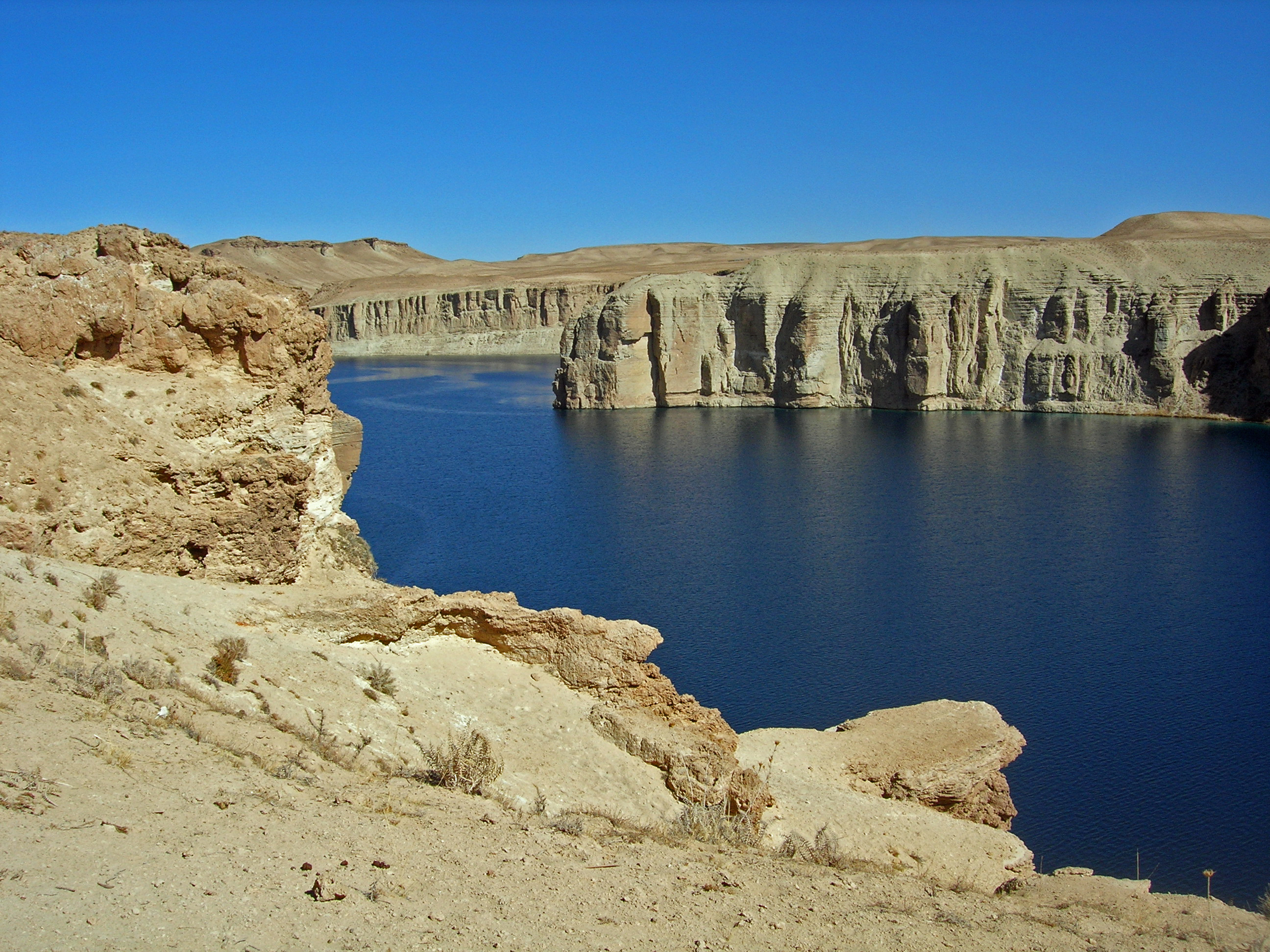
Lake Band-e-Amir in Afghanistan. Photo by: Carl Montgomery

The next morning Mike offers the taxi driver even more money and begs him to drive to the village. The driver accepts and they begin the journey. The pair are stopped at a road block and the taxi driver warns Mike it is the Taliban. Mike gets out of the car and scrambles down a nearby cliff to escape the Taliban who shoot at him but do not follow down the cliff. Mike begins to walk towards the village but collapses from the heat and dehydration. Taliban soldiers find him unconscious in the desert and take him captive, chaining him in a cave.

The Taliban men discuss whether to kill Mike but their leader, Sher Khan, wants to interview him first. They speak through an English speaking Taleb, and Mike explains why he is in Afghanistan. Khan tells him that giving the money would be disrespectful and asks "your people kill thousands of us. Why do you care about this one man?"

Khan takes Mike to a bombed building and tells him that his brother and his brother's entire family were killed by an American drone there. Khan agrees to bring Mike to Ghazi Ghar. On the way to the village the English-speaking Taleb teaches Mike how to say ""I killed someone, please forgiveness," in Pashto as a proper apology.

When Mike reaches Ghazi Ghar he explains that he is there because he killed a man in the raid three years prior. He walks through the village explaining how his team carried out the raid and that they thought the men shooting at them were Taliban. The villagers take him to the family of the man he killed where he apologises in Pashto. The man's widow Sherbano cries and throws shoes at him while the two sons stare at Mike furiously.

The community decides to hold a Jirga, a meeting of elders to decide whether to punish or forgive Mike. The Jirga decide Inam Khan, the son of the man who Mike killed, deserves to decide his fate. He steps through the crowd with a dagger, holds it to Mike's throat before sheathing it and deciding to forgive him. The Jirga believes he has made the correct decision and one elder says "forgiveness is mightier and [more] honourable than taking revenge."

Mike assists in the ritual sacrifice of a sheep and then leaves the village.

== Cast ==
- Sam Smith as Mike Wheeler
- Basheer Safi as Sher Khan
- Muhammad Shah Majroh as Colonel Rafiq
- Sher Alam Miskeen Ustad as Afghan Taxi Driver
- Amirshah Talash as English Speaking Taleb
- Arzo Weda as Sherbano
- Inam Khan as Sana Gul

== Production ==
The film was written and directed by Benjamin Gilmour and produced by John Maynard through Felix Media.

=== Conception ===
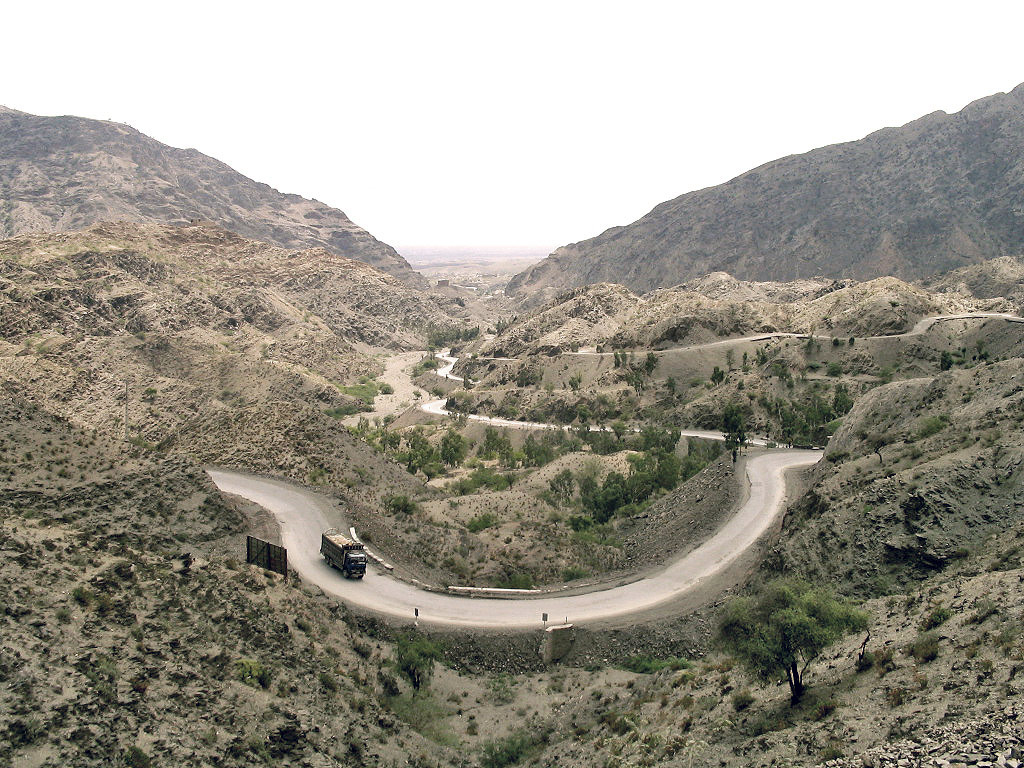
Khyber Pass.

While Gilmour was shooting his previous two films "Son of a Lion," and "Paramedico," he spent a lot of time on the border of Pakistan and Afghanistan. Looking at the Khyber Pass Gilmour said he felt drawn towards the country but was unable to make a film there at the time as it was under Taliban control. In Pakistan he met with many refugees from Afghanistan and "found them to be the most engaging, generous, kind people." He found they were deeply connected to their culture, music and poetry and that he felt more comfortable in the company of Pashtun men than men of his own country. In 2013 on a trip to Afghanistan Gilmour decided he had to create a film set there.

Gilmour also worked as a paramedic in New South Wales for 20 years. This work brought him into close contact with Veterans of the War in Afghanistan, who shared with him their stories of the war as well as the guilt they experienced as a result of their actions. Gilmour combined the experiences of these veterans and the Afghan refugees he had met in Pakistan into the story of Jirga. He believed it was important to show people seemingly on opposite sides of the war, both suffering the same tragic consequences.

Gilmour wrote a draft screenplay in Australia in conjunction with Afghan refugees in Pakistan, in order to create the most realistic story possible. The script was simply an outline which would be rewritten on location with the assistance of local people. "You can't sit 10 000 kms [sic] away from the country you're going to shoot in and write a script and put dialogue into the mouths of people who are speaking a language which is not your own," Gilmour said.

Gilmour was worried he would not find an actor willing to travel to a dangerous part of the world to perform such a role. He was introduced to Sam Smith by a friend who was cast after a "brilliant audition". Smith bought his own costume as well as the guitar which was used in the film. In order to achieve the worn look it required, Smith painted it, rubbed it with sandpaper and soaked it in water at Maroubra beach in order to achieve the worn look.

=== Filming ===
The original plan was to shoot the film in Pakistan, on the border with Afghanistan. Gilmour says the production was "lured to Pakistan with promise of considerable finance from a businessman in Islamabad." According to Gilmour this businessman was going to invest "$100 000 U.S. dollars, which goes a long way in Pakistan." Gilmour and Smith arrived in Pakistan to begin production. However the production was shut down as the Inter-Services Intelligence deemed the script too politically sensitive and prevented the shoot. The original script was set in a music school and was "a lot more campy, a lot more Baz Lurman style" according to Gilmour.

After this set back “Returning to Australia to make alternative plans would've been the sensible conclusion to our adventure. Instead, we went with Plan B and decided to shoot the whole film ourselves in Afghanistan" said Gilmour.

Gilmour spoke to his friend George Gittoes who lived in East Afghanistan and ran The Yellow House, an artists collective in Jalalabad, to get in contact with Afghan actors and filmmakers. Gilmour and Smith bought the only Sony A7S in Pakistan and two plane tickets to Kabul and headed to Afghanistan to shoot the film. The camera did not have many of the accessories traditionally utilised in a film production such as stabilisation. However it was compact which Gilmour said "was a blessing in disguise," as it better suited their sporadic and dangerous filming schedule.

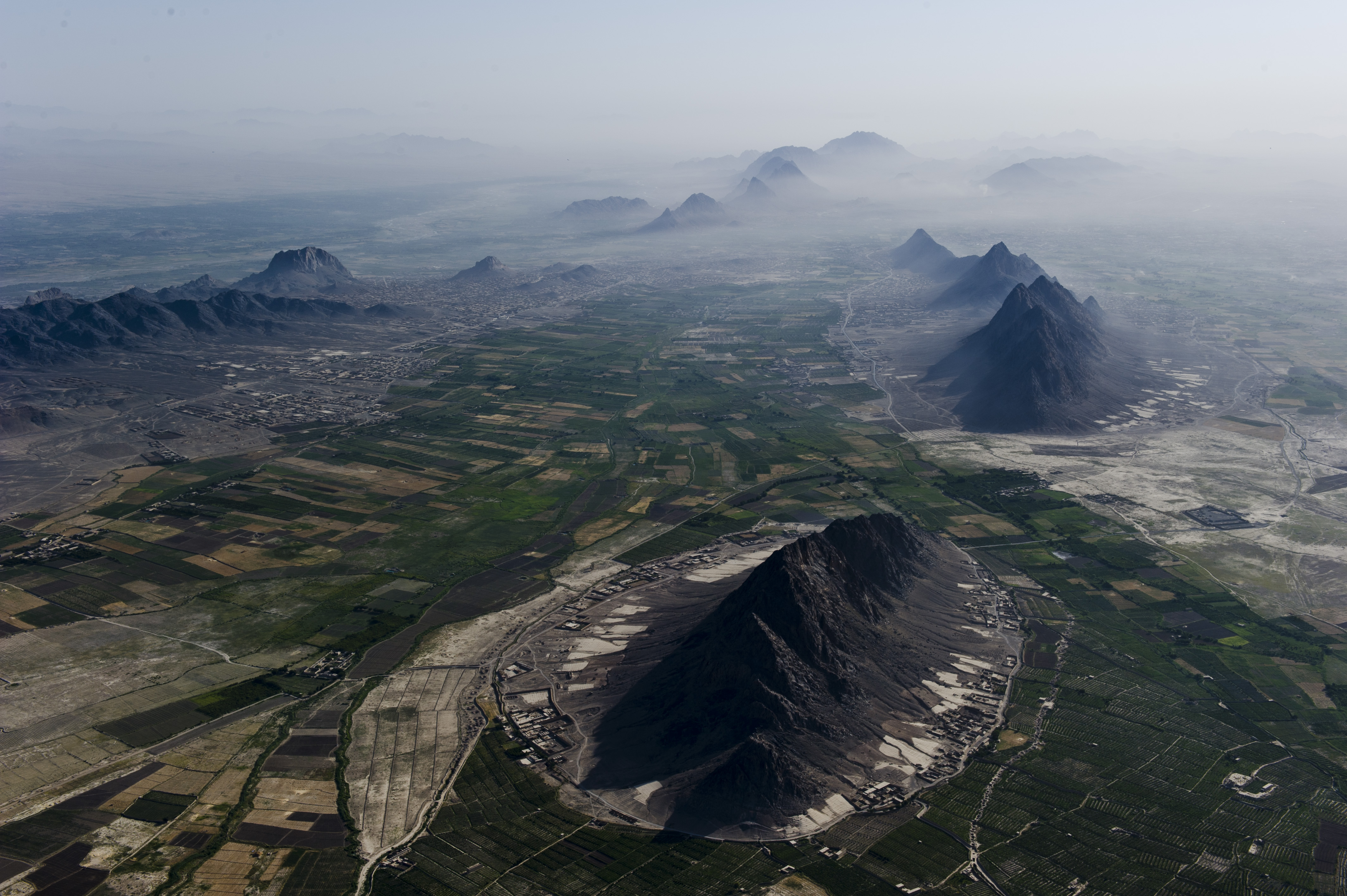
Kandahar Province

Once in Kabul Gilmour and Smith sat down with two Afghans, a tour guide and an actor they had hired and talked through the script, which was constantly revised with the assistance of Afghan locals. Gilmour and Smith then went to the Afghanistan Film Commission to acquire permits to film their movie. The Director of the Afghan Film Commission, Ibrahim Arify, was very skeptical, believing Gilmour would create a negative portrayal of Afghanistan. Arify asked to see the script before he granted the permits. Gilmour did not want to do this because the script included violence carried out by the Taliban and was sure the film would be rejected. However, when looking at Gilmour's passport Arify began to converse with him in German, a bond which Gilmour believes eventually convinced him to grant the permits.

The Afghan people both added and removed scenes from the original screenplay. Some scenes which were removed included one in which Sher Khan looked longingly at a photograph of Marilyn Monroe and scenes involving the Taliban militants constructing improvised explosive devices.

Shooting in Afghanistan was difficult. Without knowing what the security situation is going to be, who will be near the filming or where you're going to be able to shoot pre-planning became almost impossible. "People here check the daily security level like people back home check the weather forecast," said Gilmour. Gilmour described the production as almost "like a news crew," filled with constant tension and adrenaline. Additionally, the crew had to pay the Afghan Police and army in order to prevent their information being sold to Taliban forces.

The harsh landscape and small crew and budget also presented numerous challenges. Gilmour had to be the camera operator and director, which he said took away from his ability to focus on either task completely. Plus, scenes which involved Smith sliding down a mountain of shale became very dangerous as Gilmour had to follow him doing the same thing while holding a camera. Gilmour said he does not believe the shots could have been completed on any other film set due to occupational health and safety requirements.

A real hotel was used as the set of the Hotel scenes in Kabul. The crew built their own reception in order to curtail their impact on the business, but had a few people attempt to check in at their fake desk. The receptionist was played by a Pashtun comedian Naqibullah Shinwari. The bellboy was played by a homeless gang leader called "Steel." Gilmour had seen him in the film 'Snow Monkey,' and cast him for his stark appearance. Steel was 14 years old and had the nickname because he hid razorblades in his mouth, which he used to rob tourists.

The script also went through large changes as Sher Alam Miskeen Ustad, who played the Taxi Driver, could not speak English. In the screenplay the taxi driver and Mike conversed often. However, Gilmour found the fact Ustad could not speak English a refreshing change. "We were blessed by the way things went downhill for us", he said. Instead the crew decided to focus on forms of non-verbal communication such as music. This change was amplified as Smith asked Gilmour if they could do many scenes without words. “I learned a lot from Sam about what an actor can do that doesn’t require dialogue. And I found that very interesting,” Gilmour said about the experience.

Sher Alam was a former Mujahideen, and the head of Afghan Palace guards for President Daoud Khan. He had fought the Russians and was a revered Jihadi. However, when the American army invaded Afghanistan he said he would not fight for the Taliban and had to flee the country due to threats against his life and family. As a result, Sher Alam had to carefully consider reentering Afghanistan to film the movie, but eventually joined the cast.

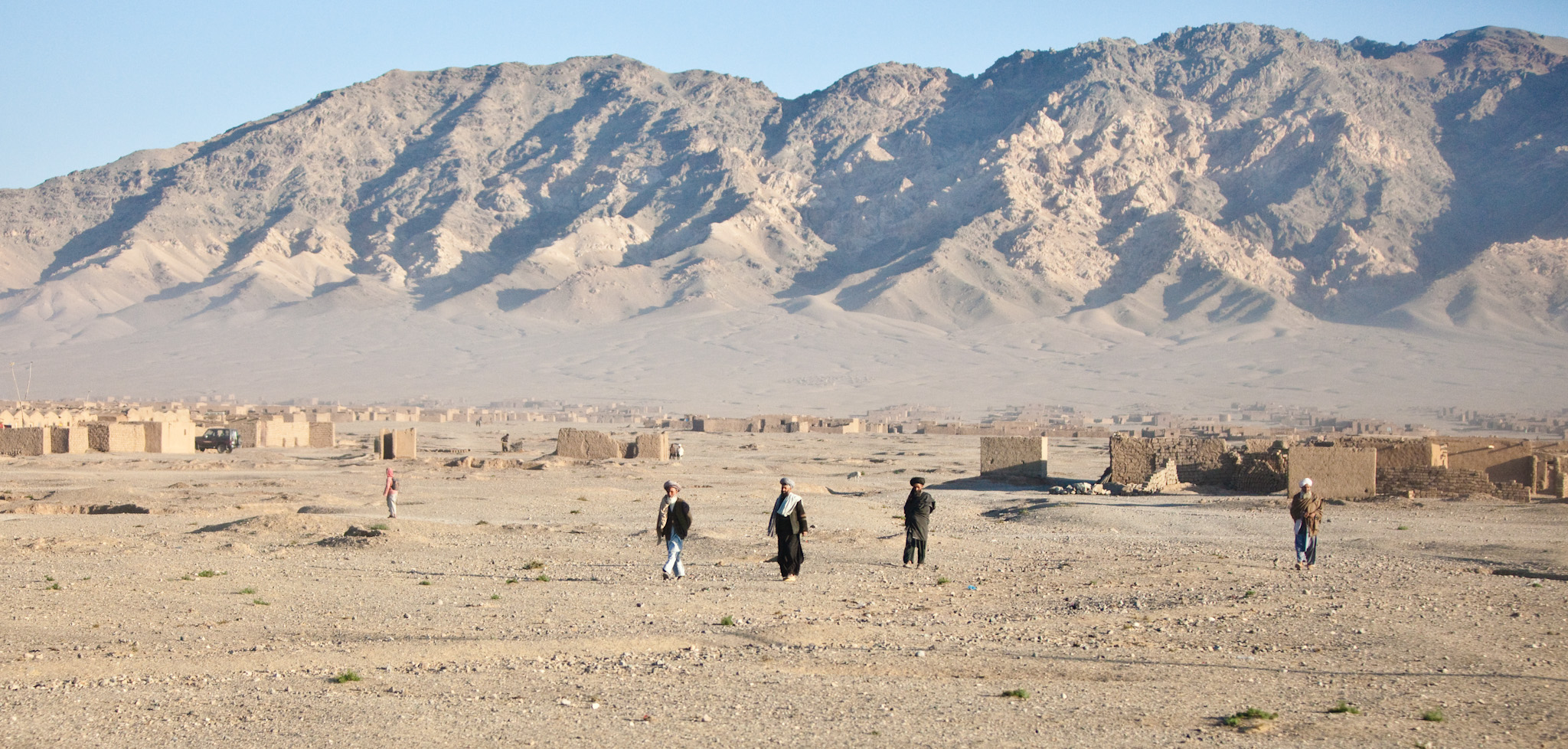
Village in Afghanistan

Additionally, Sher Alam could not drive which was a requirement of his role. However, he said he would learn, "If I can fire an RPG, driving a car will be easy,". When Gilmour asked Sher Alam to sing while driving he almost crashed the taxi and Smith had to steer the car from below the frame of the camera while Sher Alam pretended to drive.

The lake scenes were filmed at Lake Band-e-Amir which Gilmour had visited in 2012. Standing by the lake, he was inspired to share its beauty with the world and wrote the scenes that take place there in order to do so.

While filming in Jalalabad, the crew stayed at a hotel called The Spin Ghar. This hotel is the usual choice for Westerners staying in the city and is a frequent target of attacks and kidnapping attempts. The last foreign guest was an Australian aid worker, named Kerry Wilson, who was kidnapped. Smith said the hotel reminded him of the Overlook Hotel in The Shining.

While staying at The Spin Ghar, the Second Secretary at The Australian High Commission in Kabul, David Timbs, called Gilmour and said there were threats against the crew and that they needed to leave Jalalabad. Timbs suggested that Gilmour finish shooting the film in Morocco or Turkey but, without the necessary funds, Gilmour, Smith and the crew decided to continue shooting in Afghanistan.

Gilmour asked Timbs to tell the American forces where the crew would be filming so that they wouldn't be attacked by military helicopters or drones. The crew was going to shoot actors dressed as Taliban, carry AK47s and kidnap an Australian man, which would look extremely dangerous to surveying military vehicles not aware of the film. Timbs asked for the coordinates of the filming locations and passed the information on to American forces to help protect the crew.

The Taliban actors were cast in the Rose Garden of the hotel. The first choice to play Sher Khan, the Taliban leader, was an actor from Nangahar. However, the village he was from was controlled by both Taliban and Daesh, and the actor was unable to work in the film as his clan would potentially be endangered by his collaboration. As a result, Basheer Safi, who had been cast as a Taliban henchman was moved to the role of Sher Khan.

Production was postponed because the Provincial Governor of Nangahar had not assigned the police and army escorts the crew required. The mountains of Tora Bora where the crew wished to shoot was only 20 km from Daesh positions and it would have been extremely dangerous to film there without the army and police protection.

While waiting for the escorts to be approved, Gilmour and Smith purchased two Fosters beers. Possession of alcohol is illegal in Afghanistan, and especially dangerous in the strictly Islamic, Jalalabad. As a result, the beers had been purchased on the black market, smuggled in the floor of a taxi and discovered by Afghan Police who had to be bribed in order to reach the two Australians. After this journey, the two beers cost USD$114. However, the small taste of home relaxed the two Australians, and Gilmour said it was well worth the price.

The next day, the escorts were approved and the crew began to film the Taliban scenes in Buddhist caves in the mountains of Tora Bora. Smith had Gastroenteritis and as a result refused to eat the chicken prepared for the scenes. He ate some bread and pretended to eat the chicken to avoid ingesting harmful bacteria.

Two men were seen running away from the caves on the last day of shooting at the location. The police believed the men had placed IEDs in the cave and forced the crew to abandon the scenes left which took place in those caves.

The crew had only two days to film all of the scenes which take place in the village of Ghazi Ghar which concludes the film. Many of the real villagers were used as actors in the film, which delayed shooting as they would often look directly into the camera and force a shot to be started again. However, Gilmour was glad that they used the actual villagers for actors, as the children who had been suggested by casting agents in Pakistan had all looked like "pudgy private school kids in Shiny clothes." Instead, for the part of Ana Gul, the son of the man killed by Mike Wheeler, Gilmour cast Inam Khan, a child in the village whose face showed the signs of his hard life.

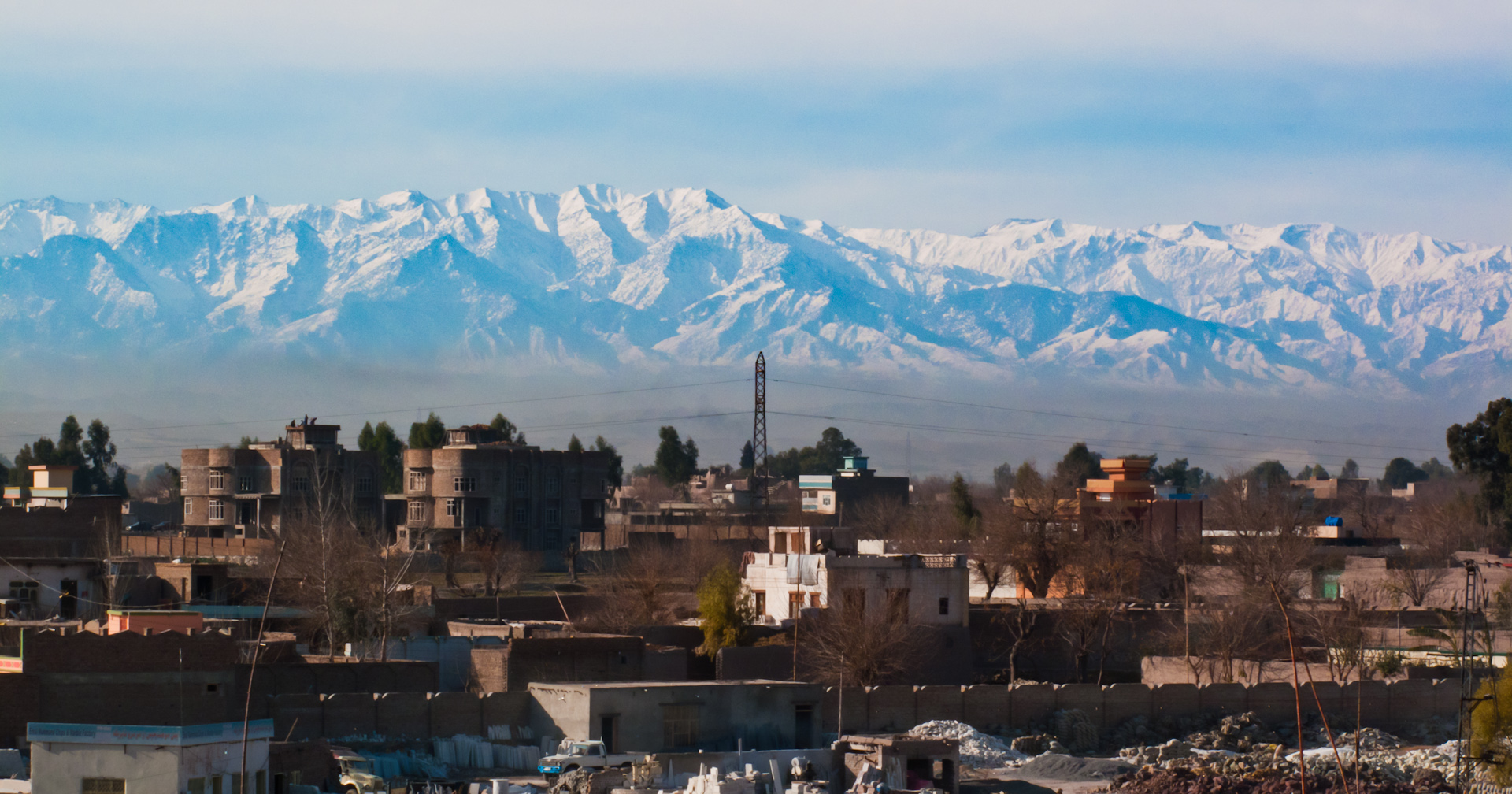
A View of Spin Ghar

The end of the film, in which Mike Wheeler places himself at the hands of the Jirga, was planned to be as real as possible. The crew briefed the actual village elders that this was a story about a former soldier who was returning to apologise for killing one of the men of their village. As a result, the Jirga scene played out like a real Tribal Council, with the elders debating how they would deal with such an event if it had actually occurred. Due to miscommunication some of the elders were not aware it was a fictional film and believed Smith was a real soldier returning to their village to confess to killing one of their people.

After this scene, the script called for Smith to carry a small lamb on his shoulders to be sacrificed for the village. However, Amirshah got a full-sized sheep, which Smith could not carry on his shoulders. Amirshah said he got the large sheep because the animal was actually to be sacrificed and it was a hungry village that he wanted to be able to feed. The crew filmed the sheep being sacrificed by the village.

While filming the final shots of a bus leaving the village, the crew saw a US army convoy approaching along the road and a drone directly over their position. Gilmour ran for their car but was told to slow down as he looked suspicious and had to calmly walk to the car. The crew was able to finish shooting safely.

Production was completed in 2017.

== Release ==
Jirga premiered at the Sydney Film Festival on 8 June 2018 where it was the only Australian film in competition. Afterwards it was screened at the New Zealand Film Festival and then various other film festivals across Australia including CinefestOz, Melbourne International Film Festival and the Adelaide Film Festival. Jirga had its North American premier at the Toronto International Film Festival. It was released in Australian cinemas on 27 September 2018.

== Reception ==
=== Critical response ===
Jirga has an approval rating of 78% on review aggregator website Rotten Tomatoes, based on 23 reviews, and an average rating of 6.8/10. The website's critical consensus states: "Jirga movingly depicts the weight of a soldier's grief -- and the human capacity for change and forgiveness in the wake of awful tragedy". Metacritic assigned the film a weighted average score of 59 out of 100, based on 6 critics, indicating "mixed or average reviews".

Luke Buckmaster of The Guardian gave the film 4/5 Stars. Harry Windsor of the Hollywood Report said the film "feels a little obvious and even patronizing: a redemption story by an Australian filmmaker that lets its Australian protagonist off the hook in a manner too neat to be dramatically interesting." Paul Byrnes of the Sydney Morning Herald gives the film 4/5 and calls Gilmour a film maker "with a strange combination of talents: he's very passionate about trying to make a better world; a little redemptive perhaps, being the son of an Anglican preacher, but crazy brave."

=== Box office ===
Jirga had grossed $110,056 across nine cinemas as of 14 October 2018. In the first week of release in Australia it was only screened in one cinema, where it made $2,495 in its first weekend, placing it as the 33rd highest-grossing film of the weekend within Australia. In its second weekend of release it expanded to eight cinemas and grossed $13 859, placing it as the 30th highest-grossing film of the weekend.

=== Awards and nominations ===
Jirga won the Best Film Prize at CinefestOz in August 2018, receiving A$100,000 in prize money. The jury chair, Sigrid Thorton, said the film was a "visceral insight into an age-old culture [and] explores the nature and definition of forgiveness, leaving us with truly unforgettable cinematic moments".

It also won the inaugural AACTA Award for Best Indie Film in the 8th edition of the AACTA Awards at a ceremony in December 2018.

It was chosen as Australia's submission for the Academy Award for Best Foreign Language Film for the 91st Academy Awards, but it was not nominated.

In 2019, AJ True's score was nominated for "Best Music" at the Film Critics Circle of Australia Awards, and the "Feature Film Score of the Year" at the 2019 APRA/AGSC Screen Music Awards.

Gilmour won a New South Wales Premier's Literary Award for the script of Jirga.

== See also ==
- List of submissions to the 91st Academy Awards for Best Foreign Language Film
- List of Australian submissions for the Academy Award for Best Foreign Language Film
