= Benjamin Gilmour =

Australian German author and filmmaker

Benjamin Gilmour is a German Australian author and filmmaker, best known for writing and directing the film Jirga (2018).

== Career ==
=== Paramedic ===
Gilmour became a paramedic around 1999. He has worked in public health development in low-middle income nations.

=== Writing ===
Gilmour has written several non-fiction books.

Warrior Poets: Guns, Movie-making and the Wild West of Pakistan, first published in 2008, is an account of the making of his feature film, Son of a Lion, but it also describes much about the Pashtun people of the North-West Frontier Province and in particular the town of Darra Adam Khel, where guns are made.

Paramedico - Around the World by Ambulance (2012), a "collection of adventures by Australian paramedic Benjamin Gilmour as he works and volunteers on ambulances around the world".

The Gap: A paramedic's summer on the edge (2019) is a memoir recounting incidents in a group of paramedics' work in the lead-up to Christmas one summer.

Cameras and Kalashnikovs: The Making of Jirga (2018) is about making the film Jirga in Afghanistan.

He is also the author of an illustrated book for children The Travel Bug (2011), and two volumes of poetry, The Song of a Hundred Miles and Night Swim.

=== Films ===
Son of a Lion (2007) was his first film, a documentary filmed in Pakistan as he lived among the Pashtun tribes of the Northwest Frontier Province.

Paramedico (2011) is another documentary film, released at the same time as his book of the same name. It was nominated for the Foxtel Best Documentary Award at the Sydney Film Festival.

Gilmour wrote and directed the 2018 film Jirga, Son of a Lion (2007) and Paramedico (2012). Jirga won the inaugural AACTA Award for Best Indie Film at the 8th AACTA Awards in 2018 and the CinefestOZ Film Prize. It was selected as Australia's entry to the 91st Academy Awards in the Best Foreign Language Film section.

== Publications ==
- Song of a Hundred Miles: A Collection of Poetry (1998)
- Warrior Poets: Guns, Movie-making and the Wild West of Pakistan (2008)
- Paramedico - Around the World by Ambulance (2012)
- The Travel Bug (2011)
- Cameras and Kalashnikovs: The Making of Jirga (2018)
- The Gap: A paramedic's summer on the edge (2019)
- Night Swim: New Poetry by Benjamin Gilmour (2020)

== Filmography ==
Year	Title	Ref
2008	Son of a Lion	Screenwriter & director
2012	Paramedico	Director
2018	Jirga	Screenwriter & director
