= The Royal Hotel (film) =

2023 Australian film by Kitty Green

- Theatrical release poster
- Directed by: Kitty Green
- Written by: Kitty Green; Oscar Redding
- Based on: Hotel Coolgardie by Pete Gleeson
- Produced by: Liz Watts; Emile Sherman; Iain Canning; Kath Shelper
- Starring: Julia Garner; Jessica Henwick; Toby Wallace; Hugo Weaving
- Cinematography: Michael Latham
- Edited by: Kasra Rassoulzadegan
- Music by: Jed Palmer
- Production companies: See-Saw Films; Screen Australia; South Australian Film Corporation; Screen NSW; HanWay Films; Cross City Films; Alma Margo
- Distributed by: Transmission Films
- Release dates: 1 September 2023 (Telluride); 23 November 2023 (Australia)
- Running time: 91 minutes
- Country: Australia
- Language: English
- Box office: $1 million

The Royal Hotel is a 2023 Australian psychological thriller film directed by Kitty Green, who co-wrote the screenplay with Oscar Redding. The film stars Julia Garner, Jessica Henwick, Toby Wallace, and Hugo Weaving. It is inspired by the 2016 documentary Hotel Coolgardie by Pete Gleeson.

The Royal Hotel premiered at the 50th Telluride Film Festival on 1 September 2023. It was released in Australia by Transmission Films on 23 November 2023.

== Plot ==
Two young American backpackers, Hanna and Liv, are travelling through Australia. After running out of money while partying in Sydney, they take up an employment agency's offer to work as bartenders at the Royal Hotel, a pub in a remote outback mining town. Upon arrival, they meet the pub's owner, Billy, and his wife Carol, who also works as the pub's cook. Hanna and Liv's first shift is handling the raucous farewell party for their predecessors, English tourists Jules and Cassie. While working, they meet several of the pub's regulars. Hanna is disturbed by the casual sexism, misogynistic jokes and inappropriate behaviour displayed by the pub patrons, who are mostly men, although Liv brushes it off as cultural differences.

The next day, Jules and Cassie are driven back to town by a mysterious local named Dolly. Matty, a young regular at the pub who crudely flirted with Hanna and Liv the previous night, pays them a visit. The group goes swimming nearby; Hanna begins to bond with Matty. Returning, they observe Billy and Carol's unstable relationship and learn that Billy has not paid deliveryman Tommy for the last three months, much to Carol's chagrin. That night at the girls' upstairs living quarters, while Liv is asleep, Hanna rebuffs Matty's sexual advances and orders him to leave. Hanna is frightened when Dolly comes upstairs and she quickly bolts their bedroom door. In the morning, Matty apologises to Hanna. Over the next few nights, Hanna continues to endure harassment by the pub patrons, while Liv is embraced by the regulars for her easygoing attitude.

Liv begins to join the regulars in drinking, striking up a friendship with local miner Teeth. During one quiet night, after an intoxicated Liv retires early and leaves Hanna to work alone, a drunk and aggressive Dolly antagonises Hanna and a few patrons before Billy forces him to leave. Hanna is rattled by the incident, but Liv believes Dolly to be harmless. Shortly afterwards, when a snake invades the girls' living quarters, Dolly offers to retrieve it. The next morning, Hanna discovers Dolly has left the dead snake in a jar of alcohol with her name on it, further upsetting her, but Liv once again dismisses Hanna's concerns.

After unsuccessfully attempting to get Dolly banned from the pub, Hanna announces that she and Liv are quitting, but Billy refuses to pay them. During an argument with Carol over paying Tommy and the girls, Billy injures himself in a drunken fall, and Carol sets out to drive him to the nearest hospital several hours away. Before leaving, Carol reveals she has taken most of the money to pay Tommy and has left some for Hanna and Liv. She instructs the pair to make as much money as they can and then leave when the next bus arrives in two days.

On their last night at the pub, Hanna throws a birthday party for Liv. Learning from Teeth that Liv has left the pub with Dolly, Hanna finds her drunk in Dolly's car in the parking lot. Dolly attempts to drive off, but Hanna intervenes, slashing one of his tires with an axe. Hanna and Liv return to the pub, where they argue. The next morning, Hanna awakens to let Matty in, only to discover Dolly is with him. The two men break in and chase Hanna to her living quarters. Liv leaves with Dolly while Hanna brandishes an axe to block Matty from entering her room. A scuffle ensues, and Hanna is injured.

As Dolly and Matty take Liv to their car, Hanna steps outside. Alarmed by her friend's injuries, Liv breaks free from Dolly and reunites with Hanna. As Dolly approaches the pair, Teeth smashes into his car with his truck and assaults Dolly as Matty flees. Retreating to the pub, the girls hurl and smash several bottles of liquor. When Teeth walks in, declaring that he beat up Dolly to claim Liv for himself, Liv angrily turns him away. With the pub floor covered in liquor, Hanna sets the building on fire. Hanna and Liv walk away in silence as the Royal Hotel burns behind them.

== Cast ==
- Julia Garner as Hanna
- Jessica Henwick as Liv
- Herbert Nordrum as Torsten
- Bree Bain as office woman
- Ursula Yovich as Carol
- Hugo Weaving as Billy
- James Frecheville as Teeth
- Daniel Henshall as Dolly
- Toby Wallace as Matty
- Baykali Ganambarr as Tommy

== Production ==
=== Development ===
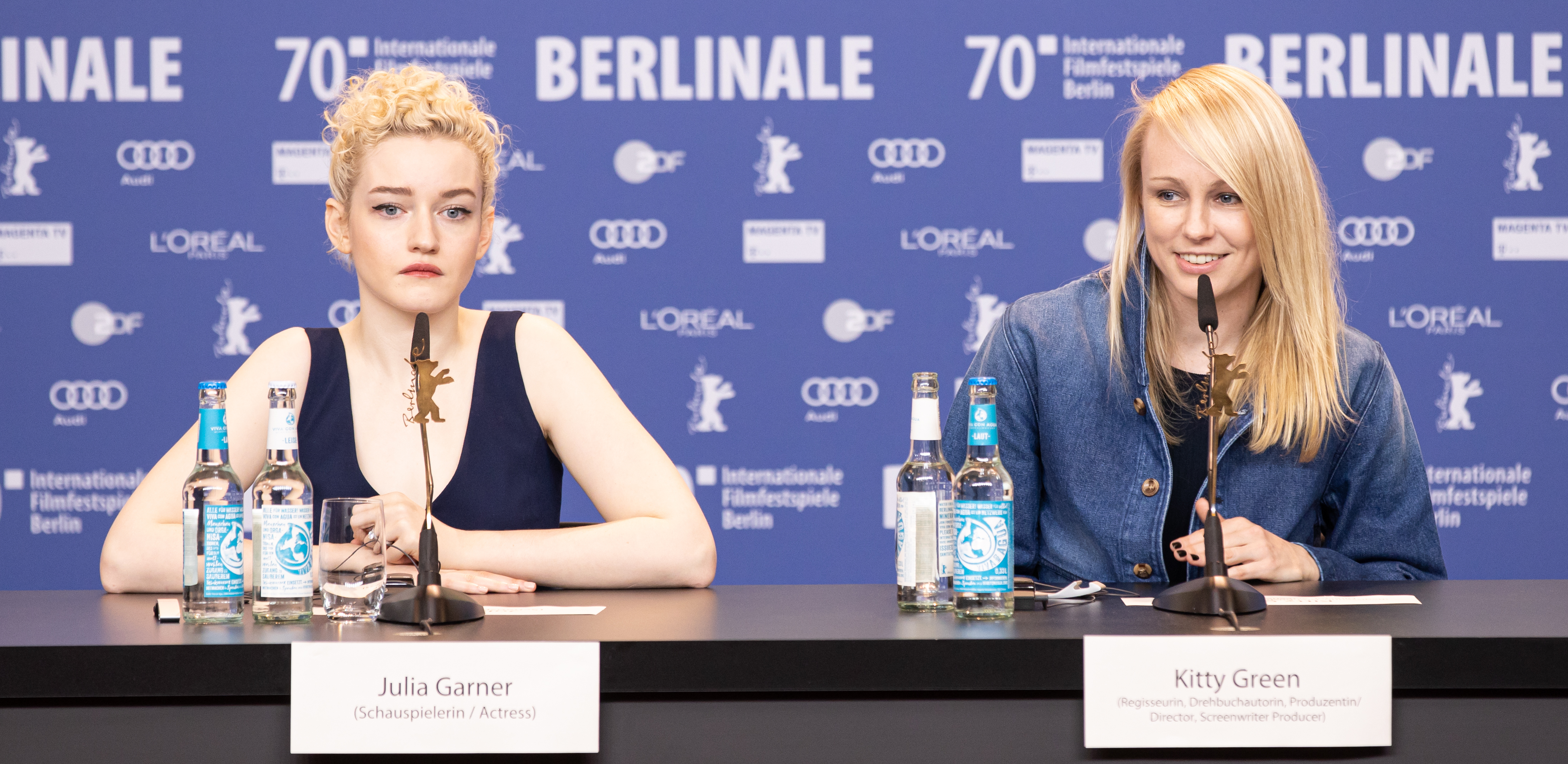
The film reunited actress Julia Garner with director Kitty Green

Kitty Green co-wrote the script with Oscar Redding, inspired by Pete Gleeson's 2016 documentary Hotel Coolgardie, which chronicles two young Finnish female backpackers who face misogyny while working as barmaids at a pub in the mining town of Coolgardie, Western Australia. Production comes from See-Saw Films through producers Emile Sherman, Iain Canning and Liz Watts along with Scarlett Pictures' Kath Shelper. HanWay Films and Cross City Films handled international sales, with Neon taking North American distribution rights, in April 2022.

=== Casting ===
Hugo Weaving and Jessica Henwick joined the cast in April 2022. Toby Wallace was confirmed to have joined the cast in August 2022.

=== Filming ===
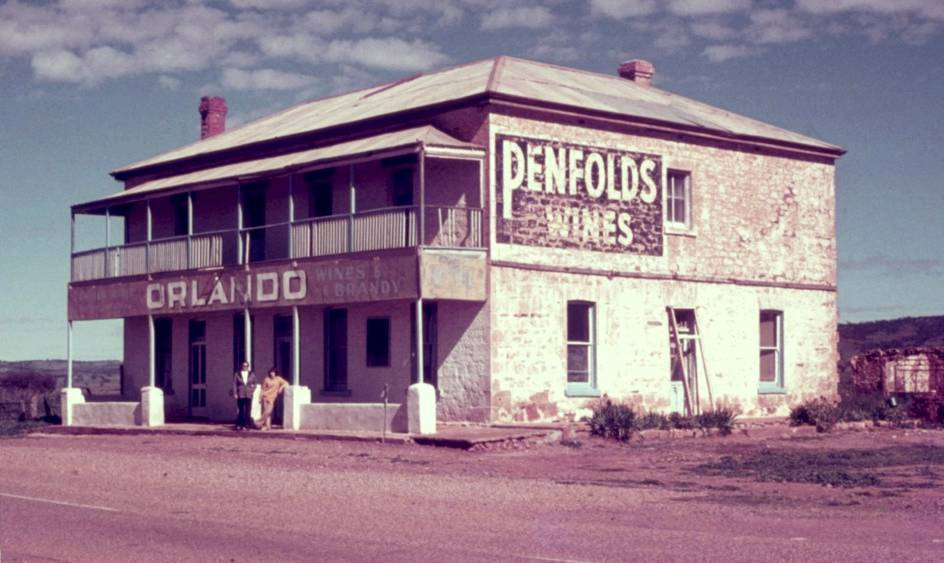
The Yatina Hotel where the film was shot.

Principal photography took place in the town of Yatina and other areas around South Australia in August 2022. A disused bar in Yatina, a town with a population of 29, was used for The Royal Hotel. While the upstairs living area of the building was used for filming, scenes of the bar on the ground floor were shot on a separate stage.

Filming took place over 21 days. Green and cinematographer Michael Latham storyboarded many of the scenes prior to filming.

== Release ==
The Royal Hotel had its world premiere at the 50th Telluride Film Festival on September 1, 2023. It also screened at the 2023 Toronto International Film Festival on 7 September 2023. It was released by Neon in the United States on 6 October 2023, and was released by Transmission Films in Australia on 23 November 2023.

=== Critical response ===
On the review aggregator website Rotten Tomatoes, 88% of 139 critics' reviews are positive, with an average rating of 7.1/10. The website's consensus reads: "A chilling immersion into a place and time fraught with constant danger, The Royal Hotel reunites Kitty Green and Julia Garner to electrifying effect." Metacritic, which uses a weighted average, assigned the film a score of 77 out of 100, based on 35 critics, indicating "generally favorable" reviews.

Sheri Linden of The Hollywood Reporter called the fim, "a well-etched story on dread overload". Writing for RogerEbert.com, Marya E. Gates described the film as "a Gen Z twist on the Australian classic Wake in Fright". She added, The Royal Hotel "remains a chilling and tense examination of the Outback’s toxic alcohol-fueled culture. Green continues to establish herself as an insightful chronicler of the minor yet devastating terrors of violent masculinity that many women endure everywhere they go."

=== Awards ===
- San Sebastián International Film Festival nominee for Best Film, won the RTVE-Otra Mirada Award
- BFI London Film Festival official selection
- 2023 Cinéfest Sudbury International Film Festival Outstanding International Feature Film
- Best Film category at the AACTA Awards, with Julia Garner receiving a Best Lead Actress in Film nomination.
