= Ranko Markovic =

Australian film producer

Ranko Markovic is an Australian film and television producer and is the company director and producer of Templar Entertainment. Markovic's career started out in property development and investment before moving into film. Since then Markovic has studied at the Australian Film, Television and Radio School(AFTRS) and the Metroscreen Film College. He came together with Jeff Purser in 2004 after completing his studies to form Templar Entertainment alongside Purser.

Together they produced the award-winning film Cedar Boys (2009), along with television shows I Love Youse All (2008), starring Jeff Fenech and Clublife TV (2008), a reality show based on Bloc Nightclub in Penrith, New South Wales.

== Biography ==
Markovic comes from a background in property development and investment. Over the years he ran a property development company as well as his own property investment company working as a project manager and investment consultant. Markovic went on to study film production at various institutions including AFTRS and Metro Screen. In this time he completed several short films and TV pilots.

In 2004, after completing his studies, Markovic and Purser established Templar Entertainment. Templar began seeking projects with micro to low budgets that had commercial potential. In 2005 Templar Entertainment produced their first low budget supernatural thriller Shadow of Sins, written by Edward Berridge.

In late 2006, Templar entered into a diversification process which saw them entering the domestic and international television market after shooting the television series Clublife TV. The program aired on Channel [V] in May 2008. They then created I Love Youse All which aired on Channel 9, Fox Sports and Main Event in June 2008. 2008 also saw Templar diversify into corporate/trade delivering work to organizations such as Paramount Australia, and Women's Cricket Australia.

In 2009 Cedar Boys was released and premiered at the Sydney Film Festival. The film starring Rachael Taylor and Martin Henderson was distributed by Mushroom Pictures and financed by the Australian Film Commission, the New South Wales Film and Television Office and private investors.

== Film and television ==
- Cedar Boys (2009) Directed by Serhat Caradee, Produced by Jeff Purser and Ranko Markovic, starring Rachel Taylor and Les Chantry.
- I Love Youse All (2008), Directed by Jeff Purser and Produced by Jeff Purser and Ranko Markovic, starring Jeff Fenech
- The Travelling Warrior – Pilot (2008), Directed and Produced by Jeff Purser, starring Bren Foster
- Clublife TV (2008) – Directed and Produced by Ranko Markovic
