= Lucky Country (film) =

- Directed by: Kriv Stenders
- Written by: Andy Cox
- Produced by: Smoking Gun Productions (Kristian Moliere)
- Starring: Aden Young; Toby Wallace; Neil Pigot
- Cinematography: Jules O'Loughlin
- Distributed by: Footprint Films
- Release date: 2009
- Running time: 96 mins
- Country: Australia
- Language: English
- Box office: A$28,000 (Australia)

Lucky Country, released in the United States in 2013 as Dark Frontier, is a 2009 Australian psychological thriller film set in Australia in 1902, starring Aden Young and Toby Wallace. It was titled Home until just before its Australian release.

== Plot ==
Set in 1902, the Australian Federation has been established for one year. Twelve-year-old Tom's beloved father Nat has dragged him and his sister Sarah to an isolated farm at the edge of the woods. However, Nat's dream of living off the land has died, as he loses his sanity.

When three ex-soldiers arrive at their cabin one night, Tom, like his father, believes they are providence. But their presence becomes more menacing when one of them reveals a secret: he's found gold. As the lure of gold infects everyone around him the cabin becomes a psychological battleground in which Tom's loyalty is put to the ultimate test.

== Cast ==
- Aden Young as Nat Doole
- Toby Wallace as Tom
- Hanna Mangan-Lawrence as Sarah
- Eamon Farren as Jimmy
- Neil Pigot as Carver
- Pip Miller as Henry
- Helmut Bakaitis as Connolly
- Robert Menzies as The Rabbiter

== Production ==
The film was shot in 16mm in late 2008, and took around six weeks. Cinematography was by Jules O'Loughlin. It was produced by Kristian Moliere, of Adelaide production company Smoking Gun Productions.

The budget was around $2 million. The film was developed and financed with the assistance of Screen Australia, and also had financial assistance from the South Australian Film Corporation and the Adelaide Film Festival.

The film was titled Home until just before its Australian release, but was retitled just before its release as there was another film of the same title being screened at the 2009 Adelaide Film Festival.

== Release ==
Lucky Country had its official premiere at the Adelaide Film Festival in May 2009, and was also premiered at the Dungog Film Festival in New South Wales in the same month. It was also screened at the 2009 Montreal World Film Festival, the 2009 Cork Film Festival, the 2009 Cinema des Antipodes in Saint-Tropez, the 2010 Palm Springs Film Festival, and the 2010 London Australian Film Festival.

It was given limited release in Australian cinemas on 16 July 2009.

In 2013 it was released on DVD and Blu-ray in the United States under the title Dark Frontier.

== Reception ==
The film received mixed reviews, with Margaret Pomeranz giving it one of the highest ratings on the ABC's At the Movies, with four stars out of five.

== Awards and nominations ==
Jules O'Loughlin won a Silver Award in the NSW + ACT state section of the 2009 Australian Cinematographers Society Awards.

Lucky Country was nominated for two awards at the 2009 AFI Awards:

- Mariot Kerry, for Best Costume Design
- Toby Wallace, for the Young Actors' Award

== See also ==
- Cinema of Australia
