= Under My Skin (2020 film) =

- Directed by: David O'Donnell
- Written by: David O'Donnell
- Produced by: Paul F. Bernard; Carrie Finn; Rob Gibson; Chase B. Kenney; David O'Donnell; Raynen O'Keefe; Alex Russell
- Starring: Liv Hewson; Alex Russell; Bobbi Salvör Menuez; Lex Ryan; Kylo Freeman
- Cinematography: Jac Fitzgerald
- Edited by: Kevin Ward
- Music by: Evelyn Morris
- Production company: Five Lip Films
- Distributed by: Stan (Australia); 1091 Pictures (US & Canada) High Fliers Films (UK)
- Release dates: 29 October 2020 (Raindance Film Festival); 21 August 2021 (Australia VOD); 6 June 2023 (U.S.)
- Running time: 96 minutes
- Countries: Australia; United States
- Language: English

Under My Skin is an Australian-American drama film directed by David O'Donnell, starring Liv Hewson, Alex Russell, Bobbi Salvör Menuez, Lex Ryan, Kylo Freeman and Alexis Denisof.

== Cast ==
- Alex Russell as Ryan
- Liv Hewson as Denny 1
- Kylo Freeman as Denny 2 (credited under their former name)
- Lex Ryan as Denny 3
- Bobbi Salvör Menuez as Denny 4
- Alexis Denisof as Mike
- Michael Ray Escamilla as Collin
- Diana Hopper as Daisy
- James Saivanidis as Garth
- Joseph Lee Anderson as Tallis
- Davida Williams as Dana
- Dominic Russell as Chase
- Jeffrey Doornbos as Townsend
- Mason O'Sullivan as Randall
- Ashwin Gore as Brian

== Plot summary ==
Denny, a free spirited artist falls for Ryan, a strait-laced lawyer. Young love ensues, but when Denny begins to explore gender, Ryan’s ingrained values are challenged. As Denny finds they can no longer ignore their true self, pressures mount and the couple seek to negotiate the shifting sands. Denny is played by four different actors, exploring four chapters in their story.

== Production ==
Production was by O'Donnell's production company, Five Lip Films. The film was shot in 15 days in Los Angeles, California.

The film employs a noteworthy narrative device. Four actors (Hewson, Freeman, Ryan, Menuez) play the lead character, Denny. O'Donnell noted, "Given our film centers on a gender non-conforming lead, it was a natural choice to also utilize a non-conforming narrative structure that would challenge an audience to question conventions".

== Release ==
The film premiered at the Raindance Film Festival on 29 October 2020. It screened at various festivals including NewFest, Santa Barbara International Film Festival and Mardi Gras Film Festival and was acquired by Australian streaming platform Stan and 1091 Pictures in the US. The film premiered in the US and Canada on 6 June 2023.

== Reception ==
Alan Ng of Film Threat gave the film a score of 8/10, praising the performances of Hewson, Freeman, Ryan and Menuez as well as the film's portrayal of Denny and Ryan's relationship, and called it "utterly captivating".

The Curb called the film a "difficult watch for a number of reasons", but a "valuable and ultimately hopeful one."

Chris Bright of FilmInk wrote that while the film "adheres to many Hollywood romantic cliches", and "a lot of the sub-characters fall to the wayside quickly", the film's story is "unique" and O'Donnell is "certainly breaking new ground".

Guy Lambert of The Upcoming gave the film 4 stars calling it "a dazzlingly executed example of the cinema of the future. Times are changing, and this groundbreaking production will likely act as a foundation for movies to come".

Rich Cline from Shadows On The Wall praised it as "an important film, powerfully eye-opening and hugely moving".

Chad Armstrong of The Queer Review noted "[T]he conceit of using multiple performers is an interesting one and works well; not only demonstrating Denny’s unease in their own skin, but also Ryan’s confusion in dealing with a person who is changing day-by-day" and calls it a "story of people in flux".

Dennis Harvey of 48 Hills expressed criticism of the ensemble casting of the central character [Denny] and stated "Under My Skin is an intriguing conceit, but it stays stubbornly abstract when it means to be psychologically revealing".

== Awards and nominations ==
Under My Skin was nominated for an Australian Academy of Cinema and Television Award (AACTA), and O'Donnell received an Australian Director's Guild nomination.

Liv Hewson received a nomination for Best Performance at Raindance Film Festival.
