= The Stranger (2022 film) =

Film by Thomas M. Wright

- Australian release poster
- Directed by: Thomas M. Wright
- Written by: Thomas M. Wright
- Based on: The Sting: The Undercover Operation That Caught Daniel Morcombe's Killer by Kate Kyriacou
- Produced by: Rachel Gardner; Emile Sherman; Iain Canning; Joel Edgerton; Kerry Kohansky Roberts; Kim Hodgert
- Starring: Joel Edgerton; Sean Harris; Jada Alberts
- Cinematography: Sam Chiplin
- Edited by: Simon Njoo
- Music by: Oliver Coates
- Production companies: See-Saw Films; Anonymous Content; Blue-Tongue Films
- Distributed by: Transmission Films (Australia); Netflix (worldwide)
- Release dates: 18 May 2022 (Cannes); 6 October 2022 (Australia)
- Running time: 116 minutes
- Country: Australia
- Language: English

The Stranger is a 2022 Australian psychological crime thriller film written and directed by Thomas M. Wright, starring Joel Edgerton and Sean Harris. Based on the non-fiction book The Sting: The Undercover Operation That Caught Daniel Morcombe's Killer by Kate Kyriacou, and inspired by the investigation of the murder of Daniel Morcombe. The film tells the story of this investigation, a child abduction case, focusing on an undercover police officer (Edgerton) in a sting operation tasked with getting close to and forming a friendship with the prime suspect (Harris).

The film premiered at the Cannes Film Festival on 18 May 2022, under the Un Certain Regard section. It had a limited theatrical release in Australia by Transmission Films on 6 October 2022 and streamed worldwide on Netflix on 19 October. The film received positive reviews from critics.

== Plot ==
The police suspect Henry Teague of the abduction and murder of a young teen but lack proof. They use the Mr. Big procedure to elicit a confession while continuing to search for evidence. Undercover police officer Paul Emery introduces himself to Teague during a long bus ride and strikes up a friendship with him. After gaining Teague's confidence and sympathy, Emery introduces him to a criminal acquaintance, Mark Frame. Frame, who is also an undercover police officer, offers Teague low-level work in a supposed criminal organization. Frame and Emery emphasize that the organization values honesty above all, and they push Teague to reveal any criminal history that could jeopardize it. Teague admits to having been in and out of jail, culminating in a two-year sentence for assault, but claims to be otherwise clean.

The undercover officers portray Emery as having gotten himself into a great deal of trouble, which the organization clears up through their police contacts. Teague is recruited and tasked with helping to get a fake passport and plane ticket out of the country for Emery. Before pretending to leave the country, Emery urges Teague to trust Frame and be honest with the organization, which he says will protect him.

Frame becomes a mentor to Teague, drawing him further into the organization and introducing him to increasingly influential figures, all of whom are secretly undercover police officers. Teague comes to rely on Mark for companionship; in one sequence, Teague plays the 1982 Icehouse song "Trojan Blue" and dances to its opening bars while Frame watches. Teague later makes a sexual advance toward him. Frame relays any information gained from Teague to Detective Senior Constable Kate Rylett, who investigates it further. Rylett finds holes in Teague's alibi for the night of the abduction and uncovers the fact that, under a different name, he had been convicted for an earlier assault of another child; this convinces her of his guilt.

After Teague briefly disappears, the police fear he may be getting anxious. A police officer pretending to be corrupt relays information to Teague that he is about to be charged. Frame tells Teague that the head of the organization, John, needs to see him. John reminds Teague that his organization can give him a new life, as they did with Emery. To make this possible, John says Teague must reveal all the details of the crime so the evidence can be erased. Frame becomes agitated as John nervously bumbles some of his lines. However, Teague is convinced to confess and takes the undercover police officers to the scene of the crime in the woods, where he is arrested.

After a long and painstaking search for evidence, one of the dozens of officers finds some physical evidence (exactly what is not shown). At the same time, Frame becomes haunted by the case, feeling sadness and anxiety. He starts to have trouble sleeping and becomes overprotective of his young son, who also starts to develop anxiety as a result of his father not letting him go outside the house.

== Cast ==
- Joel Edgerton as 'Mark Frame'
- Sean Harris as Henry Peter Teague / Peter Morley
- Jada Alberts as Detective Senior Constable Kate Rylett
- Cormac Wright as Mark's son
- Steve Mouzakis as Paul Emery
- Matthew Sunderland as Controller / Detective Sergeant Cross
- Fletcher Humphrys as Detective Senior Constable Graham Ikin
- Alan Dukes as John
- Ewen Leslie as Assistant Commissioner Milliken
- Gary Waddell as WA Head
- Brendan Cooney as Senior Victorian Detective
- Jeff Lang as Milliken Offsider
- Anni Finsterer as Female uniformed cop (uncredited)
- Heather Farmer as Female Detective (uncredited)

== Production ==
In April 2020, during the COVID-19 pandemic in Australia, it was announced that the film, under the working title, The Unknown Man, would begin filming in South Australia as soon as enough of the COVID-19 restrictions were lifted. Written and directed by Wright, it was produced by and stars Joel Edgerton. Sean Harris played the second lead role. The film was originally announced at Berlin's European Film Market in February, and was made by Anonymous Content and See-Saw Films, with support from Screen Australia and the South Australian Film Corporation.

Principal photography of the film began on 29 October 2020 in Australia.

== Reception ==
On the review aggregator website Rotten Tomatoes, 92% of 48 critics' reviews are positive, with an average rating of 7.5/10. The website's consensus reads: "A masterful blend of genre elements, The Stranger brings a tautly told mystery to life with simmering tension and a pair of outstanding lead performances." Metacritic, which uses a weighted average, assigned the film a score of 74 out of 100, based on 10 critics, indicating "generally favorable" reviews.

Luke Buckmaster of The Guardian wrote a glowing review of the film, having wrote "it’s abundantly clear that The Stranger has crept, assiduously, into brilliance; to call it an unconventionally impressive crime drama is to put it very lightly." Writing for RogerEbert.com, critic Brian Tallerico called the film "taut and effective" and that it's "worth seeking out." In Variety, Peter Debruge praised the film's direction, saying, "'The Stranger' confirms that Wright has arrived, even if his treatment sometimes feels more oblique and self-consciously arty than the material demands."

In July 2022, due to the film being inspired by the Daniel Morcombe murder investigation, Morcombe's parents "demanded" that the filmmakers stop using his name to market the film and were upset that they continued to do so.

The producers of the film responded with a statement: "The Stranger is a fictionalised account of the undercover police operation that resulted in a successful murder prosecution. Out of our deepest respect for the family, the name of the victim is never mentioned in the film and the film does not depict any details of the murder. Nor is the family represented in the film in any way. Instead it tells the story of the unknown police professionals who committed years of their lives and their mental and physical health to resolve this case and others like it. When the film was first in development, the producers approached the family to make them aware of the film. They declined to be involved. It is a decision we continue to respect."
