= Cedar Boys =

2009 Australian film

- Theatrical release poster
- Directed by: Serhat Caradee
- Written by: Serhat Caradee
- Produced by: Matthew Dabner; Ranko Markovic; Jeff Purser
- Starring: Les Chantery; Buddy Dannoun; Waddah Sari; Rachael Taylor; Martin Henderson; Daniel Amalm
- Cinematography: Peter Holland
- Edited by: Suresh Ayyar
- Music by: Immortal Technique
- Distributed by: Screen Inc.
- Release dates: 10 June 2009 (Sydney); 30 July 2009 (Australia)
- Running time: 100 minutes
- Country: Australia
- Language: English
- Budget: $1.3 million
- Box office: $354,160

Cedar Boys is a 2009 Australian film about the life of three young adults in Western Sydney, New South Wales, Australia. Written, directed and co-produced by Serhat Caradee and produced by Matthew Dabner, Ranko Markovic, and Jeff Purser, Cedar Boys had its world premiere at the 2009 Sydney Film Festival. It opened in theatres on 30 July 2009 and was made available on DVD on 7 December 2009. The film has a dedication at the end to Caradee's mother, who died of cancer 19 days after the film was completed.

The film won the Audience Award during the 56th 2009 Sydney Film Festival and was nominated for "Best Film" category at the 2009 Inside Film Awards. It was an official selection in many festivals, including Vancouver, Chicago, Antalya, Dubai Film Festival, and the 2010 London Australian Film Festival.

== Plot ==
Tarek a young working class man living in Sydney's tough western suburbs, wants to help his imprisoned older brother, Jamal but cannot afford the costs. His mate Nabil, a cleaner, persuades Tarek to steal drugs from a drugs depot, and their drug-dealing friend Sam helps in distribution. Meanwhile, Tarek has met Amie, an Anglo-Australian young woman who likes to party and to snort cocaine.

== Cast ==
- Rachael Taylor as Amie
- Martin Henderson as Mathew
- Les Chantery as Tarek
- Daniel Amalm as Cassar
- Serhat Caradee as Zac
- Bren Foster as Jamal
- Waddah Sari as Sam
- Buddy Dannoun as Nabil
- Matuse Terror as Hamdi
- Ian Roberts as Bell Room Door Man
- Drew Pearson as Camera News Man
- Erica Lovell as Brigid
- Fayssal Bazzi as Assad
- Hani Malik as Walid
- Taffy Hany as Yousaf Ayoub
- Yasser Assadi as Ali
- Vico Thai as Police Officer
- Jake Wall as Simon
- Dan Mor as Danny
- Hunter McMahon as Craig
- Jayb Hoyt as Brian
- Eddie Idik as Bell Room Doorman 2
- Helen Chebatte as Huda

== Production ==
Cedar Boys cost $1.3 million to make.

== Film festivals ==
- Sydney Film Festival 2009
- Chicago International Film Festival 2009
- Vancouver International Film Festival 2009
- Dubai International Film Festival 2009
- Antalya Golden Orange Film Festival 2009
- London Australian Film Festival 2010

== Reception and box office ==
The film received mixed reviews from critics. It grossed $354,160 at the box office in Australia, but did well on the DVD for Sony Home Entertainment, Apple iTunes, and VOD markets. It has a cult following in the suburbs of Sydney, Melbourne and Brisbane due to its "outsiders" subject matter and multiple screening on Australian television and cable via Showtime and Movie Classics channel.

== Accolades ==
- Sydney Film Festival Audience Award - Serhat Caradee - Won
- Australian Directors Guild, Best Direction - Serhat Caradee - Nominated
- Australian Film Institute (AFI) Awards, Best Original Screenplay - Serhat Caradee - Nominated
- Australian Writers Guild (AWGIE Awards) - Serhat Caradee - Nominated
- Inside Film Awards, Best Film - Serhat Caradee - Nominated

== See also ==
- Cinema of Australia
