= A Lion Returns =

- Directed by: Serhat Caradee
- Written by: Serhat Caradee
- Produced by: Liz Burton; Serhat Caradee
- Starring: Tyler De Nawi; Danny Elacci; Jacqui Purvis; Taffy Hany; Buddy Dannoun; Helen Chebatte; Maha Wilson
- Cinematography: Simon Koloadin
- Edited by: Serhat Caradee; Sabin Gnawali; Devyn Heusmann
- Music by: Matt Rudduck
- Production company: Bonafide Pictures
- Distributed by: Bonsai Films
- Release dates: 22 April 2020 (Gold Coast Film Festival); 5 November 2020 (Australia)
- Running time: 92 minutes
- Country: Australia
- Languages: English; Arabic

A Lion Returns is a 2020 Australian drama film directed by Serhat Caradee, starring Tyler De Nawi, Danny Elacci, Jacqui Purvis, Taffy Hany, Buddy Dannoun, Helen Chebatte and Maha Wilson.

== Cast ==
- Tyler De Nawi as Jamal Alamein
- Danny Elacci as Omar Alamein
- Jacqui Purvis as Heidi Alamein
- Taffy Hany as Yusef Alamein
- Buddy Dannoun as Yahya Alamein
- Helen Chebatte as Manal Alamein
- Maha Wilson as Maya Alamein
- Maddox Elachi as Khalil Alamein
- Mohammad Mick Farroukh as Hesham
- Oliver Trajkovski as Mahmood
- Serhat Caradee as Ahmed
- Frances Duca as Auntie Fadia

== Release ==
The film premiered at the Gold Coast Film Festival on 22 April 2020. The film opened in theatres in Australia on 5 November.

== Reception ==
Erin Free of FilmInk called the film a "volatile, extraordinarily well-crafted treatise on the dangers of extremism, and how the bonds with the ones that you love can bring it undone", a "mini-miracle of local filmmaking" and an "excellent piece of cinema outside of its incredible production history." Free also praised the performances, calling them "uniformly excellent", and wrote that Caradee "displays a resolute command of his material from beginning to end".

Sandra Hall of The Sydney Morning Herald rated the film 4 stars out of 5 and wrote that while the script is "probably too verbose" and largely "predictable", the film's story is "told with such conviction" and the actors "pack" their dialogue with "such a charge that there’s a wealth of family history in every word."

== Awards and nominations ==
A Lion Returns was nominated for the 2020 AACTA Award for Best Indie Film in the 10th AACTA Awards.
