= Tyler De Nawi =

Australian actor

- Born: Moustafa Dennawi; July 2, 1989 (age 37); Sydney, New South Wales, Australia
- Education: University of New South Wales

Tyler De Nawi (born July 2, 1989) is an Australian actor and human rights activist.

He made his debut TV appearance in SBS drama miniseries The Principal. He then gained recognition as the boy next door, Elias Habib on Australian comedy TV series Here Come the Habibs (2016), followed by an appearance in Doctor Doctor (2017).

In April 2017 he made his stage debut in Bengal Tiger at the Baghdad Zoo, in which he played the role of Uday Hussein alongside Maggie Dence in a story based on the fall of Iraq and the Saddam regime.

De Nawi appeared on SBS's 2019 miniseries On the Ropes.

== Early life ==
De Nawi was born in Sydney, Australia, to Lebanese and Syrian parents who migrated to Sydney from Lebanon in the 1970s during the civil war. Born into a conservative Muslim household, De Nawi was raised in Riverwood, New South Wales. His father introduced him to the figures who became his biggest inspirations which included; Bruce Lee, Muhammad Ali, and Elvis Presley.

De Nawi attended many different schools, including Hanan's Road Public School, Sir Joseph Banks High School, James Busby High School, and Cecil Hills High School. He graduated from Punchbowl Boys High School. With a love for movies and fighting, his interests outside of school fell more with martial arts, beginning with Hapkido. He discovered capoeira and Brazilian jiu-jitsu at the age of 15. Continuing Capoeira for over 10 years, he also trained in gymnastics tumbling, and learned the Brazilian-Portuguese language. At the age of 17 he began performing professionally through Australia, China and the Asia Pacific. The progression of his skill as an acrobat introduced him to the greater community, evolving his craft with elements of parkour.

== Career ==
He was cast in the action-thriller short film Hunt For Hiroshi by 9Lives Films, and attached himself to the production as a producer, discovering his interests in film and cinema, thereafter continuing his study in drama.

Upon graduating drama school, he was cast in an original Australian miniseries, The Principal, in the role of Karim Ahmed in the high school crime drama loosely based on De Nawi's home district of Punchbowl/Bankstown.

In 2016, De Nawi took on the role of Elias Habib in the Original Nine Network Television production of Here Come the Habibs in 2016. De Nawi and this program became a focus of debate around the 2016 Australian Logie Awards when one of the winners, Waleed Aly, dedicated his win to an actor who had been forced to change his given name, Mustafa, to get work on Australian television. It shortly came to light that this actor was De Nawi, who then wrote an essay for The Age describing the difficulties he had had landing auditions and jobs until he changed his first name. He pointed to the "irony in the fact that after I changed my name to Tyler I landed roles as Karim Ahmed (Syrian-Australian) in The Principal and Elias Habib (Lebanese-Australian) in Here Come the Habibs. Especially since my own heritage includes both Lebanese and Syrian ancestry."

Deciding to continue his focus on martial arts training, he began kickboxing in 2016, competing and judging in the WAKO Championship. He was then cast as a boxer in the SBS miniseries On the Ropes, playing Hayder “The Hammer” Al-Amir, middleweight champion.

In 2021, he starred in the feature film, 'A Lion Returns', where he plays, 'Jamal Alamein', a fighter who returns to Sydney to reunite with his family and terminally ill mother. De Nawi's performance has been praised by critics, "Excellent performance by Tyler De Nawi".

De Nawi has recently taken a step back from the limelight by shifting his focus onto giving back to the Sydney community. He has reported his passion lies in helping the disadvantaged youth overcome their barriers to education, employment and mental health recovery. De Nawi continues to focus on achieving this by chairing and attending motivational workshops, teaching the youth the creative art forms he has worked on for many years, including the spirituality, principles, discipline and strategy underlying his expertise in Martial Arts, Acting and the culture of Soulful Music. With a transition from Drama and Comedy, De Nawi continues to work in television with up and coming roles which focus on representing the struggles and challenges individuals of different socio-economic classes face everyday in Australia.
