= Son of a Lion =

Australian-Pakistani drama film about a Pashtun boy

- Directed by: Benjamin Gilmour
- Written by: Benjamin Gilmour in collaboration with the people of Kohat and Darra Adam Khel, Pakistan
- Produced by: Carolyn Johnson
- Starring: Niaz Khan Shinwari, Sher Alam Miskeen Ustad Baktiyar, Baktiyar Ahmed Afridi Agha, Agha Jaan Anousha Baktiyar, Fazal Bibi Pite, Khaista Mir Hayat Afridi, Anousha Vasif Shinwari, Hayat Khan Shinwari
- Cinematography: Benjamin Gilmour, Haroon John
- Edited by: Alison McSkimming Croft
- Music by: Amanda Brown
- Production company: Carolyn Johnson Films
- Distributed by: ARD Degeto Film, Mara Pictures
- Release date: 6 October 2007 (Pusan International Film Festival)
- Running time: 92 minutes
- Countries: Australia; Pakistan
- Language: Pashto

Son of a Lion is a 2007 Australian-Pakistani drama film set in Darra Adam Khel, in Pakistan's Khyber Pakhtunkhwa province. The film tells the story of Niaz Afridi (Niaz Khan Shinwari), a Pashtun boy who wants to go to school instead of carrying on the family business of manufacturing firearms. The director, Benjamin Gilmour, is an Australian former paramedic; Son of a Lion is his first film. It was filmed in the area around Darra with the cooperation of local residents. The actors are local non-professionals and much of the dialogue is improvised. It has received generally positive reviews. The film is in Pashto with English subtitles.

== Cast ==
- Niaz Khan Shinwari – Niaz Afridi
- Sher Alam Miskeen Ustad Baktiyar – Sher Alam Afridi
- Baktiyar Ahmed Afridi Agha – Baktiyar Afridi
- Agha Jaan Anousha Baktiyar – Agha Jaan
- Fazal Bibi Pite – Grandma
- Khaista Mir Hayat Afridi – Pite Afridi
- Anousha Vasif Shinwari – Anousha Baktiyar
- Hayat Khan Shinwari – Hayat Afridi

== Production ==
Gilmour visited Darra Adam Khel in August 2001, on his way from Australia to Britain, and wanted to make a film that would combat negative Western perceptions of Pashtuns and Muslims following the 11 September attacks. He wrote the first draft of the film's script (the initial title was The Bullet Boy) while working as a nurse on the sets of British TV series such as The Bill and Murphy's Law. The character of Niaz was based on a boy Gilmour met on his 2001 visit.

Gilmour returned to Pakistan in 2005 and spent several months building up the network of contacts necessary to make the film, while teaching film at IQRA University in Lahore. Eventually Gilmour was introduced to Hayat Khan Shinwari, a landowner in the Darra area, who offered him protection and assistance in making the film. Khan Shinwari is credited as the film's executive producer and assistant director.

Foreigners were banned from entering Darra soon after the 11 September attacks, and Gilmour didn't apply for a permit to enter the area, expecting that none would be granted. Instead he filmed in secret, wearing a salwar kameez and a long beard to blend in. To minimize the chance of discovery by the Pakistani authorities or Islamist militants, Gilmour says that he used "relatively safe places such as inside walled compounds, empty mountainsides and valleys to shoot many of the longer scenes with dialogue. This minimized the number of scenes we needed to shoot in the actual Darra bazaar." The film was shot on a small digital camera, again "to limit the chance of detection." Son of a Lion cost slightly over £2,000 to film. The Australian Film Commission funded its post-production.

Gilmour says that his original script "was ridiculed by the locals I wanted to work with" and so "it was soon abandoned and we started from scratch." While the film's "basic premise" remained the same, significant changes were made to its plot, and much of the dialogue was improvised. The screenplay is credited to "Benjamin Gilmour in collaboration with the people of Kohat and Darra Adam Khel, Pakistan."

According to Gilmour, "Auditions were not possible, as they would have involved exposing our mission. So our cast was taken from a small number of families in the collaborating clans." Khan Shinwari himself appears in it, and he persuaded his son Niaz (who plays Niaz), mother (Niaz's grandmother), business partner (Niaz's uncle) and others to act in it as well. Gilmour also appears in one scene, as a woman wearing a burqa. Since Gilmour speaks little Pashto, he communicated with the cast through Niaz Khan Shinwari: "What usually happened was that I work-shopped the scene with Niaz, the lead actor, who spoke excellent English. He would then, in turn, discuss the scene with the other actors in Pashto."

=== Soundtrack ===
The film's music was composed by Amanda Brown (formerly a member of The Go-Betweens) and performed by Brown in collaboration with Sydney-based Afghan, Pakistani, and Lebanese musicians. It includes a song sung by Sher Alam Miskeen Ustad Baktiyar, the actor who plays Niaz's father, Sher Alam Afridi. Baktiyar's vocals were taken from footage cut from the film, specifically from a scene in which Afridi visits his wife's grave. The soundtrack was released in September 2008. Jarrod Watt, reviewing the soundtrack for the Australian Broadcasting Corporation, gave it four out of five stars.

== Release ==
The film had its world premiere at the Pusan International Film Festival in October 2007 and its Australian premiere at the Sydney Film Festival in May 2008. It was screened at various other Australian and international film festivals as well, including the Berlin International Film Festival (February 2008), the San Francisco International Film Festival (April 2008), and the Edinburgh International Film Festival (May 2008). Hayat and Niaz Khan Shinwari travelled to Australia for the film's festival screenings there. It had limited releases in Australia in 2008 (opening on 21 August) and in the UK in 2009.

In 2008 Gilmour also published a book about the film's making, titled Warrior Poets.

In January 2009 Gilmour wrote in a newspaper editorial that "[s]ince completing Son of a Lion in 2007, one of our actors has been shot and killed, another kidnapped, while our production car was destroyed by an explosion in which its owner and his son also died. And yet, after all this, a group of extras from the film has left to join the Taliban."

=== Box office ===
Son of a Lion grossed $124,888 at the box office in Australia.

=== DVD ===
The film was released on DVD in Australia on 7 January 2009. The DVD includes deleted scenes, behind the scenes footage, and commentary by Gilmour and Hayat and Niaz Khan Shinwari.

=== Reception ===
Critics have generally responded positively to the film. As of January 2010 it had an 88% "fresh" rating on Rotten Tomatoes, based on eight reviews.

== Awards ==
Award	Category	Recipients and nominees	Outcome
Inside Film Awards (2008)	Best Music	Amanda Brown	Won
Inside Film Awards (2008)	Independent Spirit Award	Benjamin Gilmour, Carolyn Johnson	Won
Inside Film Awards (2008)	Best Feature Film	Benjamin Gilmour, Carolyn Johnson	Nominated
Film Critics Circle of Australia Awards (2009)	Best Director	Benjamin Gilmour	Nominated
Film Critics Circle of Australia Awards (2009)	Best Film	Carolyn Johnson	Nominated
ARIA Music Awards of 2009	Best Soundtrack	Amanda Brown	Nominated

== See also ==
- Pollywood
- Gun culture in Pakistan
- Afridi
- Shinwari
