= David O'Donnell (filmmaker) =

Australian Filmmaker

David O'Donnell is an Australian director, writer, and film producer known for his debut feature film Under My Skin, starring Liv Hewson, Alex Russell, and Bobbi Salvör Menuez.

== Early life and education ==
David O'Donnell grew up in a working class family, the son of a cleaner (father) and nurse (mother). He grew up in Maroubra Beach, an eastern suburb of Sydney, Australia, then known for crime and violence. It also had a surfing community, which he joined, and describes his teenage years as "wild".

He graduated from the Western Australian Academy of Performing Arts in Perth in 2007.

== Career ==
O'Donnell worked for several years in Australian theatre, film, and television.

He wrote, produced, and directed the short film Picture Wheel which screened at numerous festivals including Palm Springs, Rhode Island, Cinequest, and Santa Monica Film Festivals. It won Best Short Film at Santa Monica. It was sold to Gunpowder & Sky.

O'Donnell's dark comedy short Love & Dating: in LA! (writer, producer) screened at festivals around the world, including Cleveland International, Hollyshorts, and Santa Monica Film Festival, where it won the Audience Choice award, and sold to El Rey Network.

His debut feature Under My Skin (writer, director, producer) was nominated for Best Indie Film in the 11th edition of the AACTA Awards in 2021, and received an Australian Director's Guild nomination. Under My Skin screened at various festivals including NewFest, Santa Barbara Film Festival, and Raindance and was acquired by Australian streaming platform Stan^{[8]} and 1091 Pictures in the US. Under My Skin premiered in the US and Canada on June 6, 2023.^{[}

== Five Lip Films ==
In 2014 O'Donnell co-founded production company Rockpool Films, later renamed Five Lip Films, with Alex Russell, James Saivanidis, and Sarah-Jane McAllan. The company operates out of both Sydney and Los Angeles.

== In academia ==
O'Donnell has lectured on writing and performance at various institutions, including M.I.T. and Edith Cowan University.

== Filmography ==
Year	Title	Role	Type	Awards	Distribution
2010	Team Australia	Writer, Director, Producer	Short		
2013	Love & Dating: In LA!	Writer, Producer	Short	Audience Choice Award, Santa Monica Film Festival	El Rey Network
2017	Picture Wheel	Writer, Director, Producer	Short	Best Short Film, Santa Monica Film Festival	Gunpowder & Sky
2021	Under My Skin	Writer, Director, Producer	Feature	Best Direction Australian Director's Guild Award nomination Best Indie Film, Australian Academy Award (AACTA) nomination	Stan, 1091 Pictures, High Flier Films
--	Sons of Salt		Feature		In development^{[13]}
--	Tick		Feature		In development
