= Serhat Caradee =

Australian film director

Serhat Caradee is an Australian filmmaker, writer and actor based in Sydney, New South Wales. He is known for the feature films Cedar Boys (2009) and A Lion Returns (2020), and earlier short films.

His films have screened at many local and international film festivals, and also been nominated for numerous awards and won four.

== Early life and education ==
Born in Turkey, Caradee arrived in Australia when he was two years old. He played rugby league, rugby union, and cricket, and did boxing and martial arts before becoming interested in drama and acting on stage.

He studied performing arts for five years in total, at The Australian Playhouse Studio (TAPS), Western Sydney University's Theatre Nepean, and Actors Centre Australia, then switched focus into theatre and film direction. Caradee gained a Graduate Diploma of Arts (Film and Television) - Directing, from AFTRS (the Australian Film, Television and Radio School) in 1999.

== Career ==
As an actor, Caradee's credits include Australian TV series East West 101 and The Principal (2015), and the 2016 American sci-fi series Hunters for the Syfy Channel.

Caradee's influential role models have changed over the years, from Turkish director Yilmaz Güney, Oliver Stone and Elia Kazan early in his career, to with Krzysztof Kieslowski (Polish filmmaker) and Nuri Bilge Ceylan around 2020. He has also been inspired by human rights activists, sociologist's and writers Abby Martin, Susan Sontag, Gail Dines and Jane Elliott.

His first feature film, Cedar Boys, screened at several international film festivals in 2009 and earned award nominations in Australia, including an AACTA nomination for Best Original Screenplay and nominations for awards given by the Australian Writers Guild, Australian Directors Guild, and Inside Film. It won the Sydney Film Festival Audience Award.

A Lion Returns was shot in a record time for an Australian film, the 90 page script was shot over a total of 10 days. The story concerns a young Arab Muslim man returning from fighting for Islamic State in Syria to his family in Sydney, including his dying mother. It was released in 2020.

His upcoming film is based on American author Michael Prescott's book Mark of Kane.

== Bonafide Pictures ==
Caradee and producer Liz Burton are co-creators on a number of projects through their production company, Bonafide Pictures.
