= Thomas Henning (artist) =

Thomas Henning (born 26 January 1984) is an Australian writer, director, producer and artist working in theatre and film. He was co-founder and co-director of the Black Lung theatre company, known also as The Black Lung Theatre and Whaling firm along with Thomas Wright. From 2009 until 2010, Thomas Henning worked on several projects with Hayloft Theatre. From 2013 until 2020, Thomas Henning has worked on several projects with TerryandTheCuz productions.

In 2013 and 2014, Thomas Henning worked at Arte Moris, free art school in Timor-Leste, in the role of artist liaison. In 2014 Thomas Henning worked as dance producer for the art festival Arte Publiku.

In 2015 Thomas Henning established the Malkriadu Cinema film collective in Timor-Leste, creating fiction film, music videos and experimental video art.

In 2020 for the AsiaTOPA festival in Melbourne, Thomas Henning co-Produced and curated Huru Hara, a multidisciplinary arts installation and performance space at the Abbotsford Convent.

== Filmography ==
=== Film ===
Year	Title	Role
2015	Hard Hold	Director, editor, producer
2015	Crocodiles	Director, editor, producer
2015	Salt Shaker	Director, editor
2015	Hamrok ba Ran	Co-Director, Producer, Editor
2016	Wasting Time	Director, editor, Co-Producer
2017	Ms Dhu	Editor
2017	Rai Livre	Director, editor, co-Producer
2018	Liberdade	Director, co-producer
2018	Ema Nudar Umanu	Co-Director, Co-Writer, Co-Producer

=== Stage ===
Year	Title	Role
2004-2008	Avast I	Writer, director, Malthouse Theatre
2004	Sod	Director, actor
2005	Dingy the Fish	Co-Writer, Actor
2006-2007	Rubeville	Writer, director, producer
2007	Sugar	Co-writer, Actor
2007	A Ramble Through the Wooded Glen	Writer, director
2008	Avast II	Co-writer, Actor, Malthouse Theatre
2009	Glasoon	Writer, director, producer, The Black Lung Theatre
2009	3x Sisters	Actor, Contributing writer
2009	The Only Child	Co-Writer
2011	The Business	Actor
2013	Doku Rai	Co-writer, director, designer, the Black Lung Theatre
2010-2018	Thyestes	Co-Writer, Actor
2019	Light	Writer, director

=== Events ===
Year	Title	Role
2014	Arte Publiku	Dance Producer
2020	Huru Hara	Curator, Co-producer
