= Erik Jensen (writer) =

Australian journalist and author

- Born: c. 1988/89
- Occupations: Journalist and author
- Writing career
- Notable awards: 2010 Walkley Award — Young Australian Journalist Award — Print News, winner

Erik Jensen is an Australian journalist and author, known for his 2014 biography of artist Adam Cullen, Acute Misfortune: The Life and Death of Adam Cullen, and as founding editor of The Saturday Paper.

== Early life ==
Jensen went to primary school in Fiji, attending a Methodist school for a while. He said that it was while he was there that he discovered that his parents were "godless", so he prayed for them for about six months before he "left God at about six and a half".

== Career ==
Jensen started writing for music magazines when he was 15, and The Sydney Morning Herald employed him as a critic when he was 16. After finishing high school, the Herald took him on as a news reporter, a role he was in for five years, until at the age of 23 he became summer editor at the paper. While he was at the Herald, he won a Walkley Award for Young Print Journalist of the Year in 2010.

In 2008, Archibald Prize-winning artist Adam Cullen asked Jensen to live with him and write his biography. He stayed for about four years, in the role of observer as Cullen dealt in drugs and was arraigned for weapons possession. Jensen was even shot in the leg by Cullen, to prove his commitment to the book. After Cullen's death in 2012, Jensen completed and published his biography, titled Acute Misfortune: The Life and Death of Adam Cullen. He later said "...I allowed myself to be in fairly traumatic settings during that book, because I had convinced myself that the professional response was to be absent from them" and that he "[needed] to continue working on the project to properly extricate [himself] from it".

He had met publisher Morry Schwartz while he was at the Herald and together they decided to launch a Saturday newspaper. Jensen moved to Melbourne in 2013 in order to prepare for publication of the new weekly newspaper. The Saturday Paper was launched in February 2014, as a return to "old fashioned journalism", and based on Jensen's drive to "reconnect journalism with writing" and away from "just arranging facts from most important to least important". Jensen remained editor until June 2018, when Vice Media features editor Maddison Connaughton was appointed to the position, when Jensen became editor-in-chief of Schwartz Media.

In 2017, Jensen published an essay, Erik Jensen on Kate Jennings, in the monograph series Writers on Writing, in which he writes about the Australian novelist, poet and feminist Kate Jennings.

Jensen co-wrote the screenplay of the 2019 film Acute Misfortune, with director Thomas M. Wright. He has also written for television.

In 2019, he released a Quarterly Essay about that year's federal election, titled The Prosperity Gospel. It was described as a "dazzling report from the campaign trail".

In 2021, he released a collection of poetry, titled I Said the Sea Was Folded.

In 2024, he released a collection of political writing, titled Angry at Breakfast.

== Awards ==
- 2009: Winner, United Nations Association of Australia Media Peace Award
- 2010: Winner, Walkley Award for Young Australian Journalist Award, Print News
- 2012: Finalist, Walkley Award for Young Australian Journalist Award, Print News
- 2014: Finalist, Walkley Award, All Media Headline Journalism
- 2015: for Acute Misfortune: The Life and Death of Adam Cullen
  - Winner, "The Nib", CAL Waverley Library Award for Literature, Alex Buzo Shortlist Prize
  - Winner, "The Nib", CAL Waverley Library Award for Literature
  - Shortlisted, Victorian Premier's Literary Awards, Nettie Palmer Prize for Non-Fiction
  - Shortlisted, Walkley Book Award
- 2018: Winner, The Age Critics Award for best Australian feature
- 2019: for Acute Misfortune (2019 film)
  - Nominated, Film Critics Circle of Australia – Best Screenplay, Original or Adapted
  - Nominated, AACTA Awards, Best Indie Film
- 2022:
  - Finalist, Walkley Award, Commentary, Analysis, Opinion and Critique
  - Finalist, Walkley Award, Public service journalism
- 2023: Winner, Quill Award, Reporting on Disability Issues
- 2024: Winner, Keith Dunstan Quill for Commentary

== Bibliography ==
=== Books ===
- Jensen, Erik. Acute Misfortune: The Life and Death of Adam Cullen. 2014.
- Jensen, Erik. I Said the Sea Was Folded. 2021.
- Jensen, Erik. Angry at Breakfast. 2024.

=== Essays and Monographs ===
- Jensen, Erik. "Erik Jensen on Kate Jennings". In Writers on Writing series, 2017.
- Jensen, Erik. "The Prosperity Gospel". In Quarterly Essay. 2019.

=== Screenwriting ===
- Jensen, Erik and Wright, Thomas M. Acute Misfortune. 2019.
