= Jane Townsend =

Jane Townsend, also known as Jane Townshend, was a 19th-century British sailor. She is notable for her service on HMS Defiance during the Battle of Trafalgar.

== Biography ==
Townsend's origin is not known, with first accounts of her life placing her aboard HMS Defiance during the Battle of Trafalgar. Townsend's service during the battle is not specified by sources, but was remembered as notable with the captain of the Defiance (Philip Durham) later vouching for her. Townsend is first mentioned in the historical record when in 1847 Queen Victoria declared that the newly established Naval General Service Medal would be awarded for service regardless of sex. This caused Townsend to file a claim for the medal; her claim was originally admitted, but on reconsideration refused on the grounds that granting the award would cause complications given the number of other women who served on Royal Navy ships. According to one source, she was the first woman to be awarded the General Service Medal.

Suzanne J. Stark writing in The American Neptune argued that the grounds given for refusing the medal were clearly nonsense since over 20,000 were awarded to men and a more likely reason for the reversal was political pressure from Queen Victoria who felt that being involved in a naval battle went against a woman's natural position in life.
