= Thomas M. Wright =

Australian actor

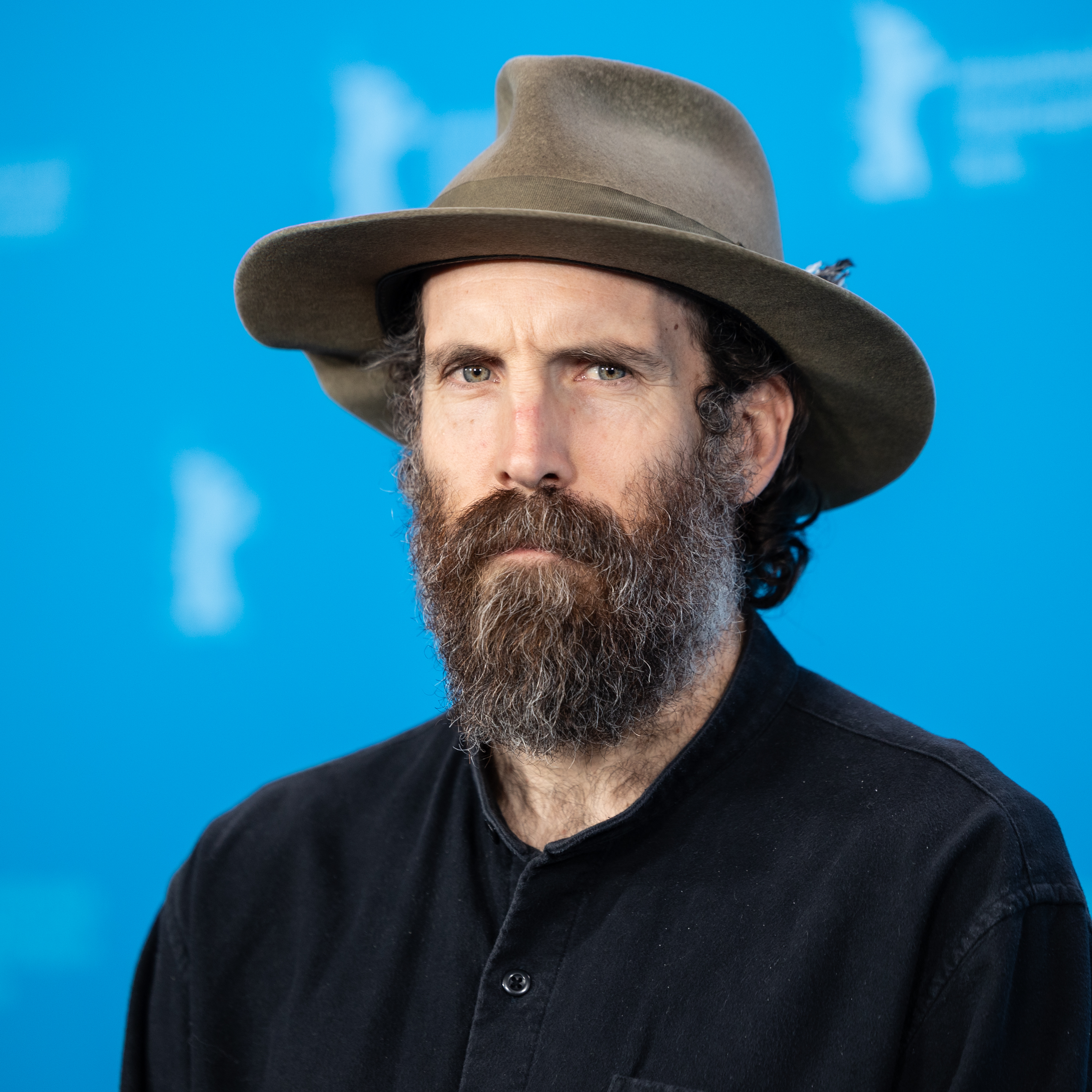
- Wright in 2026
- Born: Thomas Michael Wright; 22 June 1983 (age 43); Melbourne, Victoria, Australia
- Other name: Thomas M. Wright
- Education: Carey Baptist Grammar School
- Occupations: Actor, producer, writer, director, theatre designer
- Years active: 1998–present

Thomas Michael Wright (born 22 June 1983) is an Australian actor, writer, film director and producer. He is the co-founder (2006) and director of theatre company "Black Lung" and director of the feature films Acute Misfortune (2019) and The Stranger (2022).

As an actor he came to attention in Jane Campion's series Top of the Lake, for which he was nominated for Best Supporting Actor at the (US-Canadian) Critics' Choice Awards. The Stranger premiered at the 2022 Cannes Film Festival.

== Early life ==
Wright was born on 22 June 1983 in Melbourne.

== Career ==
=== Theatre ===
Wright created the theatre company Black Lung, also known as The Black Lung Theatre and Whaling Firm, in 2006, with fellow writer and director Thomas Henning. Their first production, Avast, was called "Insanely fast-paced, artfully arrhythmic, meta-theatrical - a breathtaking combination of precision and chaos" by Chris Kohn, writing for Realtime. Under the Black Lung banner, Wright created productions with Adelaide Festival and Darwin Festival, Belvoir, Malthouse Theatre, and Queensland Theatre Co. and Brisbane Festival. Black Lung were hailed as one of the most influential theatre companies of the decade.

Wright was the director, co-writer and production designer of Doku Rai, a production created over four and a half years, with a three-month rehearsal process on the remote island of Atauro Island, East Timor. Doku Rai came about after Wright formed a close relationship with Michael Stone, then Chief Military Advisor to the President of East Timor, José Ramos-Horta. Stone facilitated Wright flying in and out of the country over a number of years. Doku Rai was created with a group of independent Timorese artists, a number of them former resistance fighters. The film sequences in Doku Rai were co-directed by Wright with director Amiel Courtin-Wilson.

As an actor he played lead roles for the Malthouse Theatre, Melbourne Theatre Company and Sydney Theatre Company, including the title role Baal in the controversial production commissioned by Cate Blanchett and Andrew Upton and directed by Simon Stone in 2011.

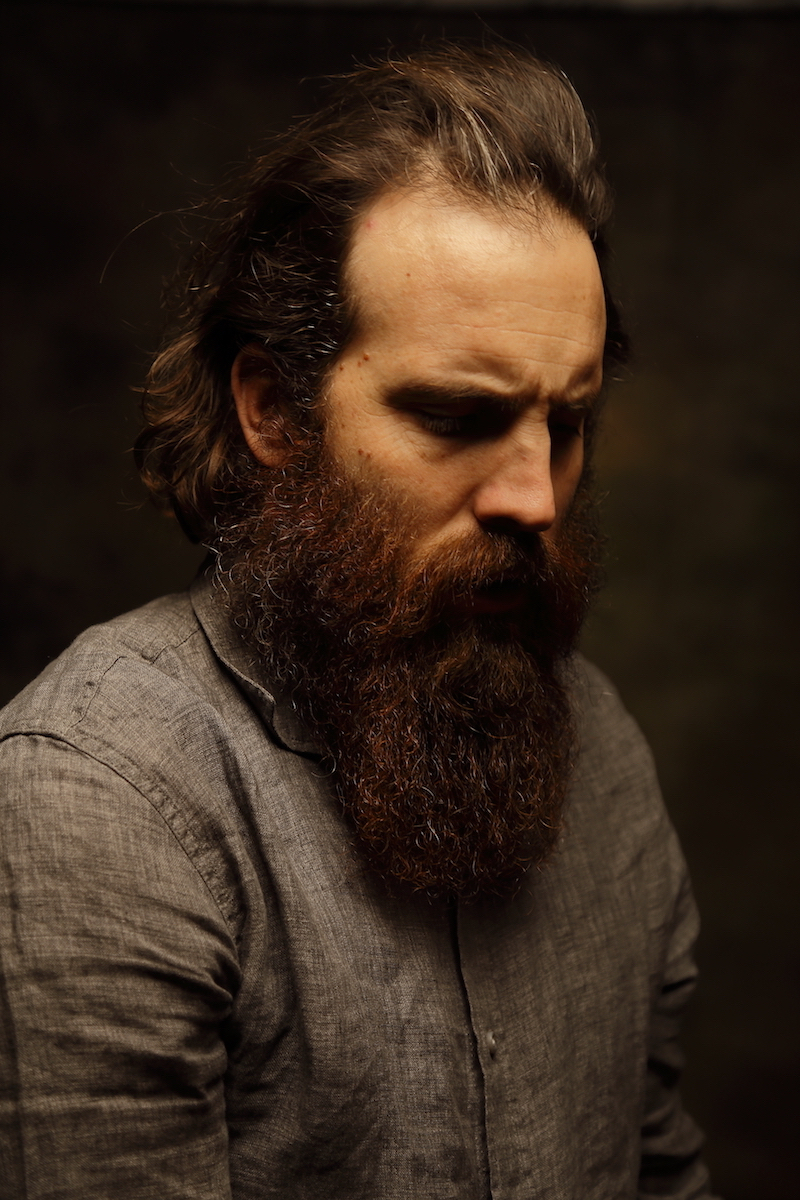
Wright in 2018

=== Television and film ===
Wright came to attention of the world as an actor in the Disney Channel Original Movies, Stepsister From Planet Weird and Zenon: The Zequel in the early 2000s, and later in the Sundance / BBC TV series Top of the Lake in 2013, for which he was nominated for Best Supporting Actor at the US Critics' Choice Awards. Regarding his casting as Johnno Mitcham in the series, director Jane Campion compared him to a young Daniel Day-Lewis.

He appeared as cult-figure Steven Linder in the 2013 US adaptation of The Bridge. Executive Producer Elwood Reid said of Wright’s audition for the series: "...it was the best audition I have ever seen. He walked in and the temperature of the room changed".

In 2015, Wright played the guide Mike Groom in the feature film Everest, based on the 1996 Mount Everest disaster, in which eight climbers were killed and several others were stranded by a storm. He also played the murdered journalist Brian Peters in Balibo (2009), and Thomas Bodenham in Van Diemen's Land.

Wright featured in the film The Man With The Iron Heart (2016), an adaptation of Laurent Binet's Prix Goncourt-winning novel, HHhH, with Jack O'Connell, Rosamund Pike, Stephen Graham and Jason Clarke. He also filmed the Sony / WGN America Series Outsiders in the lead role of Sheriff Wade Houghton for producers Peter Tolan and Paul Giamatti. His performance was cited as the standout of the series by Hollywood Reporter and Variety.

In 2017 Wright was the subject of an Archibald Prize finalist portrait by Marcus Wills, Antagonist, Protagonist (Thomas M. Wright), with a scene set up to look like a crime drama, with Wright as protagonist.

In 2018 he featured in Warwick Thornton's Sweet Country, which received the Venice Film Festival's Special Jury Prize, the AACTA Award for Best Film and the Toronto Film Festival's Platform Prize.

He co-wrote, directed and produced the feature film Acute Misfortune, released in 2019, based on Sydney journalist Erik Jensen's award-winning biography of Australian artist Adam Cullen, Acute Misfortune: The Life and Death of Adam Cullen. The film received The Age Critics' Prize at Melbourne International Film Festival, where it premiered. It received a five star review in The Guardian, and was named one of The Guardian's "10 Best Australian Films of the decade 2010-2020" and the best Australian film of 2019. It was given a "Notable mention" (along with Sweet Country) in The Monthly Awards 2018, and Screen Daily called it an "Overlooked gem" in their list of the year's best films. The film was nominated for the 2019 AACTA Award for Best Independent Film. The score, by Evelyn Ida Morris, was nominated for best soundtrack at the 2018 ARIA Music Awards. The Hollywood Reporter called Acute Misfortune "one of the year's most striking and accomplished directorial debuts". Wright is nominated in the Best Director (Feature Film) category for the 2020 Australian Director's Guild Awards.

In April 2020, during the COVID-19 pandemic in Australia, it was announced that a new film, The Stranger, would begin filming in South Australia as soon as enough of the COVID-19 restrictions were lifted. Written and directed by Wright, it was produced by and starred Joel Edgerton. Sean Harris played the second lead role. The film was originally announced at Berlin’s European Film Market in February, and was made by Anonymous Content and See-Saw Films, with support from Screen Australia and the South Australian Film Corporation. The script was shortlisted for the Betty Ronald Prize for Scriptwriting at the 2023 New South Wales Premier's Literary Awards. The Stranger screened at the 2022 Cannes Film Festival.

== Filmography ==
=== Film ===
| Year | Title | Role |
|---|---|---|
| 2000 | Stepsister from Planet Weird | Cutter Colburne |
| 2001 | Zenon: The Zequel | Orion |
| 2007 | The King | Alfie |
| 2009 | Van Diemen's Land | Thomas Bodenham |
| 2009 | Balibo | Brian Peters |
| 2010 | Torn | Tim Strauss |
| 2015 | Everest | Michael Groom |
| 2016 | The Man with the Iron Heart | Josef Valcik |
| 2017 | Sweet Country | Mick Kennedy |
| 2024 | Sleeping Dogs | Wayne Devereaux |
| 2026 | Wolfram | Mick Kennedy |

==== As director ====
| Year | Title | Role |
|---|---|---|
| 2019 | Acute Misfortune | Director |
| 2021 | The Stranger | Director |

=== Television ===
| Year | Title | Role |
|---|---|---|
| 2013 | Top of the Lake | Johnno Mitcham |
| 2013–2014 | The Bridge | Steven Linder |
| 2016–2017 | Outsiders | Deputy Sheriff Wade Houghton jr. |
| 2020 | Barkskins | Elisha Cooke |

=== Stage ===
| Year | Title | Role | Notes |
|---|---|---|---|
| 2004 | 51 Ashworth St. | The Boy | Co-writer, co-director, designer |
| 2005 | Hamlet | Laertes | Beggars Theatre |
| 2007 | The Glass Soldier | Jonas Fink | Melbourne Theatre Company |
| 2007 | Pimms | Dying Man | Writer, co-director Black Lung Theatre |
| 2008 | Love Song | Beane | Melbourne Theatre Company |
| 2008 | Avast I | The Older Brother | Malthouse Theatre, Melbourne |
| 2008 | Avast II | Jack Lemmon | Co-director, designer Malthouse Theatre, Melbourne |
| 2009 | Glasson | God | Black Lung Theatre |
| 2010 | Furious Mattress | The Exorcist | Malthouse Theatre, Melbourne |
| 2011 | Baal | Baal | Sydney Theatre Company |
| 2011 | And They Called Him Mr. Glamour | | Director, designer Belvoir Street Theatre, Sydney |
| 2011 | I Feel Awful | | Writer, director, designer Brisbane Festival |
| 2013 | Doku Rai | | Co-writer, director, designer Black Lung Theatre |
