= Adam Cullen =

Australian artist (1965–2012)

- Born: Adam Frederick Cullen; 9 October 1965; Sydney, New South Wales, Australia
- Died: 28 July 2012 (aged 46); Wentworth Falls, New South Wales, Australia
- Awards: Archibald Prize; 2000 Portrait of David Wenham
- Patrons: Edmund Capon

Adam Frederick Cullen (9 October 1965 – 28 July 2012) was an Australian artist, most known for winning the Archibald Prize in 2000 with a portrait of actor David Wenham. He was also known for his controversial subjects and his distinctive style, sometimes referred to as "grunge".

He is the subject of the feature film Acute Misfortune (2019), co-written, directed and produced by Thomas M. Wright, based on journalist Erik Jensen's 2015 biography of the artist, Acute Misfortune: The Life and Death of Adam Cullen.

== Early life ==
Cullen was born in Sydney on 9 October 1965. He graduated from the City Art Institute (now UNSW Art & Design) with a Diploma of Professional Art in 1987 and received a Master of Fine Arts from the University of New South Wales in 1999.

He was a cousin of the actor and artist Max Cullen.

== Career ==
Cullen's home and studio was located at Wentworth Falls, in the Blue Mountains of New South Wales.

Cullen's work was exhibited in solo and group exhibitions both in Australia and internationally. Cullen was well-established as a Sydney "grunge" painter when he won the prestigious Archibald Prize for his portrait of actor David Wenham in 2000. In 2002 he represented Australia at the 25th São Paulo Art Biennial.

== Style and themes ==
Cullen often employed the image of infamous and iconic Australian bushranger Ned Kelly in his artwork. He also portrayed the killers of 1986 murder victim Anita Cobby, and illustrated the underworld figure and convicted criminal Mark 'Chopper' Read's fairy tale book called Hooky the Cripple.

== Reception ==
He has been described as one of Australia's most collectible contemporary artists.

== Prizes ==
=== Archibald Prize ===
He entered the Archibald Prize at least nine times, was hung at least eight times, and won once, in 2000. He was a finalist in 1997, 1999, 2001-2004, 2006 (with his painting Edmund, depicting gallery director and art historian Edmund Capon), in 2011 and 2012.

=== Other prizes and honours ===
Cullen was exhibited in the Doug Moran National Portrait Prize show of 2000-2001 with a portrait of comedian Mikey Robins. He was the winner of the Mosman Art Prize in 2005.

== Later life and legacy ==
In 2011 he was given a suspended jail sentence for drunk-driving and weapons offences. A psychiatric report recommended treatment for bipolar disorder as well as a long-term alcohol rehabilitation program.

He died on 28 July 2012, after having been seriously ill for some time.

Erik Jensen's 2015 biography of Cullen, Acute Misfortune: The Life and Death of Adam Cullen, won the 2015 Nib Literary Award as well as being shortlisted for the Walkley Book Award and the Victorian Premier's Prize for Nonfiction.

Acute Misfortune, directed by Thomas M. Wright, based on Jensen's book, with the screenplay co-written by Wright and Jensen and focussing on Cullen's volatile relationship with his biographer, was released in 2018.

Awards
| Preceded by Euan MacLeod | Archibald Prize; 2000 for Portrait of David Wenham | Succeeded by Nicholas Harding |
