= Film industry in Western Australia =

The film industry in Western Australia encompasses a wide range of productions and a wide range of filmmakers.

Funding can be sourced from ScreenWest, Screen Australia, FTI, television broadcasters and private investors.

Filmmakers and productions can be recognised at the West Australian Screen Awards.

A dedicated screen production facility, Perth Film Studios, opened in January 2026.

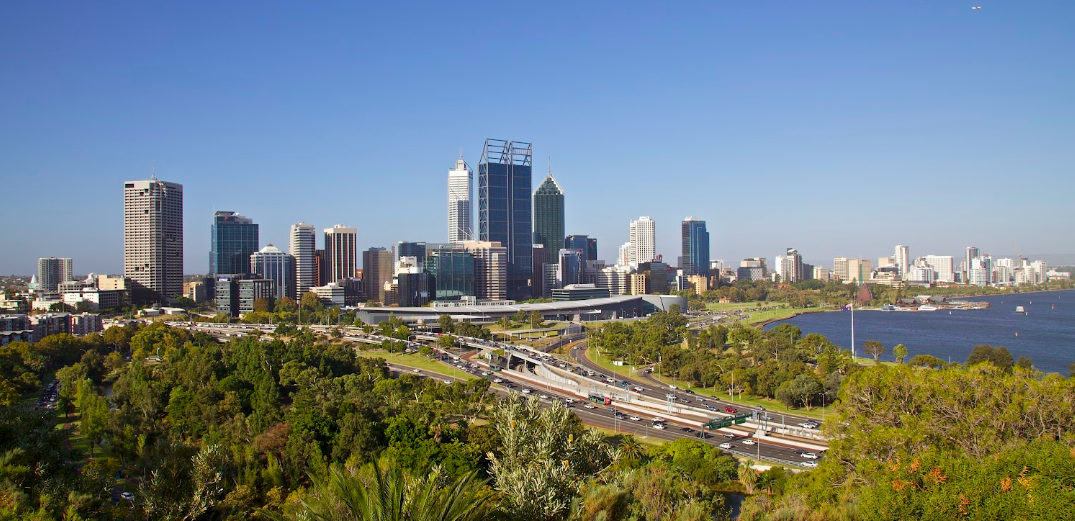
Western Australia's capital, Perth, from Kings Park

== Feature films ==
- Bad Girl (2016)
- Blackfellas (1993)
- Blame (2010)
- Boundaries of the Heart (1988)
- Bran Nue Dae (2009)
- Breath (2017)
- Day of the Panther (1988)
- Dingo (1991)
- Drift (2013)
- A Few Less Men (2016)
- Fran (1985)
- Harlequin (1980)
- Hounds of Love (2016)
- How to Please a Woman (2022)
- Japanese Story (2003)
- Jasper Jones (2016)
- Kill Me Three Times (2014)
- Last Train to Freo (2006)
- Let's Get Skase (2001)
- Looking for Grace (2015)
- Love in Limbo (1993)
- Mad Bastards (2011)
- The Olive Tree (1975)
- OtherLife (2016)
- Paper Planes (2015)
- Rabbit-Proof Fence (2002)
- The Reckoning (2014)
- Red Dog (2011)
- Red Dog: True Blue (2016)
- Satellite Boy (2012)
- Shame (1988)
- Son of a Gun (2014)
- Stone Bros. (2009)
- Teesh and Trude (2002)
- These Final Hours (2013)
- Thunderstruck (2004)
- Top Knot Detective (2016)
- The Turning (2013)
- Two Fists, One Heart (2008)
- Under the Lighthouse Dancing (1997)
- Wasted on the Young (2013)
- Windrider (1986)
- Zombie Brigade (1988)

== Independent feature films ==
Feature films made outside of the government funding bodies include:

- The Actress (2005)
- Aussie Park Boyz (2004)
- Aussie Park Boyz: The Next Chapter (2011)
- The Bouncer (2006)
- Broken (2016)
- Broken Contract (2015)
- The Burning Kiss (2017)
- Cherubhead (2021)
- The Course (2007)
- Crush (2009)
- Death Bet (2008)
- The Director's Cut (2009)
- Emu War: A Subtle Examination of the Sheer Caucasity of Colonialism (2023)
- Everybody Gets Stabbed (2020)
- Esoterica (2010)
- Foreshadow (2013)
- I Am Bish (2009)
- Indefinite (2015)
- Infected Paradise (2014)
- Little Sparrows (2010)
- Lurking Woods (2015)
- Needle (2010)
- No Through Road (2008)
- Pinch (2015)
- Plum Role (2007)
- Pulse (2016)
- Raven's Cabin (2012)
- The Sculptor (2009)
- Sororal (2014)
- The Toll (2010)
- Twisted Minds (2014)
- The Wheelchair Warriors (1998)
- White December (2016)

== Television movies ==
- 3 Acts of Murder (2009)
- An Accidental Soldier (2013)
- The Great Mint Swindle (2012)
- Justice (1998)
- Southern Cross (2001)

== Feature documentaries ==
- Frackman (2015)
- Fridey at the Hydey (2013)
- Hotel Coolgardie (2016)
- Hunter: For the Record (2012)
- Meal Tickets (2016)
- It's Not Just Me (2017)
- Parkerville Amphitheatre: Sets, Bugs and Rock n Roll (2015)
- Putuparri and the Rainmakers (2015)
- Three Hams in a Can (2009)

== Television documentaries ==
- Bom Bali (2006)
- Chateau Chunder: A Wine Revolution (2012)
- Child Soldiers (2002)
- Gallipoli Submarine (2008)
- The Hunt for HMAS Sydney (2008)
- Jandamarra's War (2011)
- Prison Songs (2015)
- The Secret History of Eurovision (2011)
- Singapore 1942 End of Empire (2012)
- Skippy: Australia's First Superstar (2009)
- Surviving Mumbai (2009)
- Wadjemup: Black Prison White Playground (2014)
- The War on Microbes (2012)

== Television and web series ==
- Boomtown (2013–2014)
- Castaway (2011)
- The Circuit (2007–2010)
- Cloudstreet (2011)
- Comic Book Heroes (2013)
- Desperately Seeking Sheila (2004)
- Dogstar (2006–2011)
- The Dreamhouse (2014)
- Falcon Island (1981)
- Foreign Exchange (2004)
- Greenfield (2015)
- Harvest (2012)
- The Heights (2019–Present)
- Henry & Aaron's 7 Steps to Superstardom (2011)
- House of Hancock (2015)
- The Legend of Gavin Tanner (2014–2016)
- Lockie Leonard (2007–2010)
- Mal.com (2011)
- Marx and Venus (2007–2008)
- Minty (1998)
- Ocean Star (2003)
- Outback Truckers (2012)
- Parallax (2004)
- Popcorn (2015)
- Railroad Australia (2016)
- The Shark Net (2003)
- Ship to Shore (1993–1994)
- The Sleepover Club (2002–2008)
- Stormworld (2009)
- Streetsmartz (2005–2006)
- Suicidal Balloon (2003)
- Sweat (1996)
- Top Knot Detective (2015–2016)
- Trapped (2008–2009)
- Who Do You Think You Are? (2008–2016)
- The War That Changed Us (2014)
- Wormwood (2007)

== Short films ==
- Arrivals and Departures (2009)
- The Artifact (2015)
- At Play (2006)
- Bad Credit and Aliens (2001)
- Barrow (2014)
- Before Closing (2007)
- The Belfast Boys (2004)
- Betrand the Terrible (2010)
- The Billabong (2010)
- Black Swan (2003)
- Blue (2009)
- Blue (2012)
- Blunt (2025)
- Bogside Boys (2003)
- The Brink (2005)
- Bush Basher (2011)
- Cain Rose Up (2010)
- Cedric & Hope (2012)
- Charlotte (2011)
- Consume This! (2006)
- The Cookie Crumbles (2013)
- Council (2016)
- Crosshairs (2012)
- Crossroad (2008)
- Crush (2001)
- The Dead Wastes (2009)
- Declan (2002)
- Deep End (2009)
- The Dinner Meeting (2012)
- Dogs Run Loose Around Here (2008)
- A Dollar For the Good Ones (2006)
- Edgar and Elizabeth (2007)
- Effective Towel Flicking (2003)
- Every Ute and Its Dog (2002)
- Exposure (2012)
- Factory 293 (2014)
- Fading West (2002)
- Fallout: Lanius (2013)
- The Fan (2013)
- Fastest Shrinking Town (2002)
- Fetch (2002)
- George Jones and the Giant Squid (2011)
- Gifted Thumbs (2002)
- A Girl's Best Friend (2016)
- Good Pretender (2011)
- Goodbye, Cruel World (2012)
- Happy Haven (2010)
- Hello, It's Freo (2009)
- Her Outback (2002)
- The Hunt (2016)
- Iron Bird (2006)
- Jack (2002)
- Junction (2002)
- Kanowna (2010)
- Karroyul (2015)
- Legacy (2008)
- Library of Love (2016)
- Light as a Feather (2010)
- Little Boxes (2009)
- Little Hunters (2002)
- Little Man (2004)
- Lola & Luis (2016)
- Love in a Disabled Toilet (2015)
- Love Like You've Never Been Hurt (2009)
- Mamani (2016)
- Man (2014)
- Matchbox (2002)
- Medusa (2003)
- Men's Room (2002)
- My Love Lilac (2015)
- My Uncle Bluey (2009)
- No School No Pool (2002)
- One Night Only (2012)
- OnO (2016)
- The Owl (2013)
- The Paddock (2003)
- Pale Blue Eyes (2014)
- Perished (2011)
- Pilbara Pearl (1999)
- The Planet Lonely (2008)
- Polarised (2012)
- Postie (2003)
- Professor Pebbles (2008)
- Rat Tale (2014)
- Reflection (2016)
- Reflections (2005)
- Restare Uniti (2011)
- Revive (2013)
- Rock and Roll Mud Wrestling (2009)
- Ronan's Escape (2010)
- Set Yourself Free (2014)
- Setting Them Straight (2015)
- Sex Ed (2013)
- Scoff (2003)
- A Short Film Named Desire (2017)
- Sleeper (2005)
- Something Fishy (2010)
- Strike (2012)
- Stump (2002)
- Submarine (2015)
- Tango Underpants (2014)
- Then She Was Gone (2010)
- Third-World Solution (2015)
- This Is Perth (2009)
- Til 3 Knocks (2008)
- Tinglewood (2009)
- Transmission (2012)
- Two Minds (2010)
- The Umbrella Condition (2005)
- Three to one (2005)
- Upside Down (2002)
- Victim (2003)
- Victims (2009)
- Vincent (2012)
- Wait 'Til Your Father Gets Home (2002)
- Watch Comes Around (2004)
- Water (2009)
- We Were Here (2016)
- Why the Long Face? (2007)

== Filmmakers ==
Past and present Western Australian writers, producers and directors include:

- Britt Arthur
- Jeffory Asselin
- Julius Avery
- Harry Bardwell
- Sam Barrett
- Paul Barron
- Brian Beaton
- Justin Beckett
- Natalie Bell
- Stuart Bender
- Dave Bishop
- Jess Black
- James Bogle
- Gavin Bond
- Michael Bond
- Lauren Brunswick
- Rebecca Caldwell
- Kody Cameron-Brown
- A.J. Carter
- Gary Centrone
- Tania Chambers
- Camille Chen
- Michael Joel Clark
- Reg Cribb
- Stevie Cruz-Martin
- Arnie Custo
- Sean Robert Daniels
- Pierce Davison
- Mat de Koning
- Tim Dean
- Brendan Dee
- Mark DeFriest
- Alex Dermer
- Eva Di Blasio
- Elissa Down
- Brett Dowson
- Coral Drouyn
- Khrob Edmonds
- Miranda Edmonds
- Lauren Elliott
- Ron Elliott
- Karen Farmer
- Damian Fasolo
- Rai Fazio
- Sam Bodhi Field
- Robert Forsyth
- Hayden Fortescue
- Damien Giglietta
- Pete Gleeson
- James Grandison
- Peter Gurbiel
- Michael Hatch
- Joe Henderson
- Cathy Henkel
- Zak Hilditch
- Mike Hoath
- Richard Hyde
- Henry Inglis
- Ross Ioppolo
- Georgina Isles
- Dean Israelite
- Jimmy Jack
- Alison James
- Brendan Joel
- Kane George Jason
- Corrie Jones
- Aaron Kamp
- Phil Jeng Kane
- David Karsten
- Maya Kavanagh
- Liz Kearney
- Nathan Keene
- Melissa Kelly
- Tenille Kennedy
- Christopher Kenworthy
- Deidre Kitcher
- Paul Komadina
- Nunzio La Bianca
- Maziar Lahooti
- Nelson Lau
- Luna Laure
- Andrew Lewis
- Matty Limpus
- Robert Livings
- Matt Lovkis
- Johnny Ma
- Roderick MacKay
- Kelrick Martin
- Michael McCall
- Stephen McCallum
- Aaron McCann
- Adrian McFarlane
- Ross Metcalf
- Jonathan Messer
- Holly Miller Brouwer
- Daniel Monks
- Robyn Marais
- Nathan Mewett

Steven J. Mihaljevich

- Pann Murujaiyan
- Carmelo Musca
- Kate Neylon
- Andrew Ogilvie
- Dan Osborn
- Jag Pannu
- Jess Parker
- Dominic Pearce
- James Pentecost
- Vincenzo Perrella
- Levon J Polinelli
- Ruben Pracas
- Adrian Prospero
- Stefan Androv Radanovich
- John Rapsey
- Chris Richards-Scully
- Chris Ridley
- Kirsten Robb
- Melanie Rodriga
- Sarah Rosetti
- Wade K. Savage
- Brooke Silcox
- Angie Smith
- Burleigh Smith
- David Vincent Smith
- Anthea Smyth
- Damien Spiccia
- Grant Sputore
- Robbie Studsor
- John V. Soto
- Nathan Stone
- Curtis Taylor
- Sue Taylor
- Julius Telmer
- Peter Templeman
- Debbie Thoy
- Ross Tinney
- Richard Todd
- Miley Tunnecliffe
- Alexander von Hofmann
- Roslyn Walker
- April Ward
- Antony Webb
- Renée Webster
- Cameron Whiteford
- Keir Wilkins
- Martin Wilson
- Alice Wolfe
- Ella Wright
- Troy Wyatt
- Ben Young
- Mark Zanosov

== Directors of photography ==
- Denson Baker (ACS)
- Ian Batt
- Laetitia Belen
- Ben Berkhout
- Dion Borrett
- A.J. Coultier
- Joel Crane
- Ivan Davidov
- George Davis
- Torstein Dyrting (ACS)
- Jim Frater
- Rusty Geller
- Stewart Hadfield
- Ulrich Krafzik (ACS)
- David Le May (ACS)
- Richard Malins (ACS)
- Michael McDermott (ACS)
- Andrew McLeod
- Alex McPhee (ACS)
- Ross Metcalf
- Lewis Potts
- David Vincent Smith
- Jason Thomas
- Michael Titter
- Antony Webb
- Sam Winzar
- Mark Zagar (ACS)

== Other industry practitioners ==
- Vikki Barr (ScreenWest)
- Tony Bective (Luna Cinemas)
- Nick Bertke (Electronic musician, visual effects)
- Rikki Lea Bestall (ScreenWest)
- Paul Bodlovich (FTI)
- Ian Booth (ScreenWest)
- Andre Chang-Fane (Visual effects)
- Michael Cunningham
- Merlin Eden (Film editor)
- Rusty Geller (Steadicam operator)
- Ash Gibson Greig (Composer)
- James Helm (Actor)
- Ryan Hodgson (ScreenWest)
- Travis Johnson (Film Critic, Filmink, The West Australian, X-Press Magazine)
- George Karpathakis (ECU)
- Jaemie Manners CSI (Colourist)
- Edward McQueen-Mason (Film editor)
- Annie Murtagh-Monks (Casting director, FTI)
- Mark Naglazas (Film critic, The West Australian)
- Andy Parnell (Sound recordist)
- Herbert Pinter (Production designer)
- Peter Pritchard (Film editor)
- Ali Roberts (Acting coach)
- Jack Sargeant (Revelation)
- Helen Shervington (CinefestOZ)
- Lawrie Silvestrin (Film editor)
- Keith Smith (ECU, Revel-8)
- Richard Sowada (Revelation)
- Stephen Sunderland (Film critic)
- Ingrid van den Berghe (Luna Cinemas)
- Robert Woods (Visual effects)

== Film schools ==
- Curtin University
- Edith Cowan University
- Film and Television Institute (FTI)
- Filmbites
- Murdoch University
- Perth Film School
- SAE Institute
- University of Notre Dame Australia
- WA Screen Academy

== See also ==
- Australian Directors Guild
- Australian Writers' Guild
- CinefestOZ, a major WA film festival
- Cinema of Australia
- List of films shot in Western Australia
- Lotterywest
- National Film and Sound Archive
- Perth International Arts Festival
