= Western Australia Screen Culture Awards =

Screen arts awards in Australia

The Western Australia Screen Culture Awards, also known as the WA Screen Culture Awards or WASCAs, acknowledge innovation and contributions in a wide range of screen-related artistic areas, where the work was created in Western Australia or by West Australians. The awards, launched in 2020, succeed a previous West Australian screen award series, and are presented annually.

== Purpose ==
The awards recognise outstanding innovation, independent spirit and contributions in the areas of contemporary short, feature and documentary filmmaking, television, computer games, VR, AR, gallery-based moving image, installations, projections and other intersections with screen and moving image forms, created in Western Australia, or by West Australians.

== History ==
The awards were launched by the producers of the Revelation Perth International Film Festival under chairperson Richard Sowada, in 2020. The promoters had support from the Australian and West Australian governments. They represent a "reimagining" and expansion of the WA Screen Awards, which had been cancelled in 2016. The award ceremony has taken place each year at the Luna Cinemas in Leederville.

=== Trophies ===
The first-year trophy was a glass circle with an engraving. In 2021 filmmaker, screen industry advocate, and previous WASCA winner Ryan Hodgson, worked with Geographik, Squarepeg Home, and Artcom Fabrication to create new trophies. Hodgson said that he "wanted to use a local, sustainable material for the trophy, and I settled on a Western Australian hardwood because timber can be fashioned into things of great beauty or practical, hardwearing things. That struck me as a good metaphorical fit for our local screen industry and its diverse and eclectic output".

== Ceremonies ==
Event	Date	Host
#1	December 13, 2020	Eloise Eftos - Comedian
#2	December 5, 2021	Dave Callan - Comedian
#3	December 4, 2022	Joe White - Comedian
#4	November 26, 2023	Ozzy Man (Ethan Marrell) - YouTube Personality

== Event format ==
The awards night is held annually in December, and the awards are presented by the Revelation International Film Festival, with the first year book-ending the festival when it had to move from its regular spot in July because of the Covid pandemic.

== Nominations and winners ==
Entry to the awards is, as of 2022, run through an external platform, File Freeway. Entry generally opens in August and closes in October and is open to any project completed within the 12 months prior. The rules state that up to 5 projects will be nominated for each award.

=== Outstanding Contribution to the Industry ===
YEAR	PRESENTED BY	NAME	AREA OF CONTRIBUTION
2020	The West Australian	Clayton Jauncey	Production Design
2021	Komixx	Perry Sandow	Lighting Design
2022	Samantha Rowe MLC	Joan Peters	Legal

=== Independent Spirit Award ===
YEAR	PRESENTED BY	NAME	AREA OF CONTRIBUTION
2020	Revelation Film Festival	Robert Woods	Director
2021	Revelation Film Festival	Johnny Ma	Studio
2022	Revelation Film Festival	Ingrid Van Den Berghe	Exhibition

=== Innovation Awards ===
Winners are shown in yellow shading and bold type.

==== 2020 ====
AWARD	PRESENTED BY	TITLE	PRODUCER/S
Narrative Feature Film		100% Wolf	Alexia Gates-Foale, Francesca Hope, Barbara Stephen, Mayank Jhalani
Narrative Feature Film		An Ideal Host	Tyler Jacob Jones, Robert Woods
Narrative Feature Film		I Met A Girl	Adam Dolman, Ryan Hodgson, Melissa Kelly
Feature Documentary/Non-Fiction		Laura’s Choice	Cathy Henkel, Ryan Hodgson, Melissa Kelly, Sam Lara
Feature Documentary/Non-Fiction		The Beloved	Joseph London
Feature Documentary/Non-Fiction		Wild Butterfly	Shireen Narayanan
Short Film or Animation		Carmentis	Jaclyn Hewer
Short Film or Animation		Judas Collar	Brooke Tia Silcox
Short Film or Animation		Yulubidyi – Until The End	Glen Stasiuk
Music Video		Break Thru	Dan Thom
Music Video		Leaving LA	Tee Ken Ng
Music Video		Like The Stars	Johnny Ma
Game Design		First Contact	Ready Team One
Virtual Reality, 360° or Augmented Reality	PAV	First Contact	Ready Team One
Virtual Reality, 360° or Augmented Reality	PAV	I Am Mother	Timothy White, Kelvin Munro, Michael Lloyd Green
Virtual Reality, 360° or Augmented Reality	PAV	Inside Earthship Freo	Kath Dooley
Moving Image and Installation Art		The Light of the Star We Are Seeing Right Now	Jennie Feyen
Web Series or Online Content		KGB	Taryne Laffar
Web Series or Online Content		Molly and Cara	Emilia Jolakoska
Web Series or Online Content		Normal Place	Tomás Ford

==== 2021 ====
Commercial Content and Best Student Film categories were introduced this year.

AWARD	PRESENTED BY	TITLE	PRODUCER/S
Narrative Feature Film		Edward and Isabella	Adam Morris
Narrative Feature Film		Good For Nothing Blues	Elle Cahill
Feature Documentary/Non-Fiction		Girl Like You	Cody Greenwood
Feature Documentary/Non-Fiction		Jaimen Hudson From Sky to Sea	Jodie De Barros
Feature Documentary/Non-Fiction		The Truth About Anxiety	Lisa Dupenois
Feature Documentary/Non-Fiction		Under the Volcano	Cody Greenwood
Short Film or Animation	AFTRS	Abiogenisis	Tania Chambers, Clint Logan
Short Film or Animation	AFTRS	In Australia	Emilia Jolakoska
Short Film or Animation	AFTRS	These Walls	Sophia Vertannes
Short Film or Animation	AFTRS	Two Sands	Lauren Brunswick, David Kucha
Short Film or Animation	AFTRS	While(Alive){}	Cody Cameron-Brown, Ziggy O'Reilly
Music Video	Johnny Ma Studios	Abiogenesis	Tania Chambers, Clint Logan
Music Video	Johnny Ma Studios	Break Loose	Priscilla-Anne Jacob
Music Video	Johnny Ma Studios	Hypnotized	Tee Ken Ng
Music Video	Johnny Ma Studios	Structural	Tania Chambers, Clint Logan
Music Video	Johnny Ma Studios	The Wild Geese	Tania Chambers
Game Design		Dementia Training Australia	Viewport XR
Game Design		Tactical Response	Ready Team One
Virtual Reality, 360° or Augmented Reality	PAV	Dementia Training Australia	Viewport XR
Virtual Reality, 360° or Augmented Reality	PAV	Fleeting	Stephanie Senior
Virtual Reality, 360° or Augmented Reality	PAV	Reflections of Iwanoff	Justin McArdle, Stuart Harrison
Virtual Reality, 360° or Augmented Reality	PAV	Virtual Whadjuk	Alice Wolfe
Moving Image and Installation Art		Abiogenesis	Tania Chambers, Clint Logan
Moving Image and Installation Art		Alluvium	Erin Coates
Moving Image and Installation Art		Leaving LA Exhibition	Aidan O'Bryan
Moving Image and Installation Art		Structural	Tania Chambers, Clint Logan
Moving Image and Installation Art		The Separation	Richard Eames
Web Series or Online Content		Hug The Sun	Max Miller, Aaron McCann
Web Series or Online Content		Iggy and Ace	Hannah Ngo
Web Series or Online Content		In Their Footprints	Glen Strindberg
Web Series or Online Content		Real Life Outback Adventures	Glen Strindberg
Student Film		Linger	Justine Hinz
Student Film		Flamingo	Sarah Williams
Student Film		Painting By Numbers	Matt Hearn, Jay Jay Jegathesan
Student Film		Piano	Alicia Fahnesa
Commercial Content		Austin XR	Viewport XR
Commercial Content		Dementia Training Australia	Viewport XR
Commercial Content		Kaboodle Kitchen Visualiser	Viewport XR
Commercial Content		Karrinyup – WA On Stage	Kate Downie
Commercial Content		Stop the Coward Punch	Martin Wilson, Nicole Ferraro

==== 2022 ====
This year, the Innovation in Narrative Feature Film category was split into two categories - over and under $1m (AUD) budget. The nominees and awards were:

AWARD	PRESTENTED BY	TITLE	PRODUCER/S
Narrative Feature Film under $1m		Bassendream	Tim Barretto, Melanie Filler
Narrative Feature Film under $1m		Cherubhead	Sarah Legg
Narrative Feature Film under $1m		Painkiller	Morgan James Munro
Narrative Feature Film under $1m		Pieces	Nicole Ferraro, Ryan Hodgson
Narrative Feature Film under $1m		Thorns & Thistles At The End of The World	Aaron Kamp, Anthony Chila
Narrative Feature Film over $1m	City of Fremantle	Avarice	John V. Soto
Narrative Feature Film over $1m	City of Fremantle	How To Please A Woman	Judi Levine, Tania Chambers
Narrative Feature Film over $1m	City of Fremantle	Where All The Lights Tend To Go	Griff Furst, Josh Kessleman, Jamie Hilton, Robin Wright,
Feature Documentary / Non Fiction	Broadcast Gurus	Facing Monsters	Frank Chidiac, Susanne Morrison, Chris Veerhuis
Feature Documentary / Non Fiction	Broadcast Gurus	Namarali	Tim Mummery
Feature Documentary / Non Fiction	Broadcast Gurus	Shipwreck Hunters Australia	Brendan Hutchens
Feature Documentary / Non Fiction	Broadcast Gurus	Stage Changers	Janelle Landers
Short Film / Animation		Freedom Swimmer	Brooke Silcox, Ron Dyens
Short Film / Animation		Match Made	Peter Williams
Short Film / Animation		Hash Browns	Alzbeta Rekosh
Short Film / Animation		Redzone	Joseph Wilkie
Short Film / Animation		Survivors of Wadjemup	Glen Paul Stasiuk
Student Film	City of Vincent	Expiration Date	Bailey Hamilton
Student Film	City of Vincent	Letters	
Student Film	City of Vincent	(Not So) Great Expectations	Dana Jolliffe
Student Film	City of Vincent	The Golden Rollers	Jennifer 'JP' Piper
Student Film	City of Vincent	Through Her Eyes	Jason Haji-Ali
Student Film	City of Vincent	Walk Run Strive	Sarah Williams
Commercial Content	PAV	Queens On The Edge	Emilia Jolakoska, Grady Habib
Commercial Content	PAV	The View From Here	Emma Pegrum
Music Video		ANI – Anywhere Else	
Music Video		Drapht & WASO – Jimmy Recard	
Music Video		Drapht & WASO – Where Ya From	
Music Video		Inneka – Prof Strohl	
Music Video		The Hills – The Faim	
Game Design	StemSmart	Lost & Hound	Brian Fairbanks
Game Design	StemSmart	Isle of Trials: Curse of The Fire God	Ready Team One
Moving Image and Installation Art	City of Vincent	BUFF[ED]	Sioux Tempestt
Moving Image and Installation Art	City of Vincent	Equal Opportunity To Be A Dictator	Danielle Marie Freakley
Moving Image and Installation Art	City of Vincent	Making Dalison	Emma Pegrum
Moving Image and Installation Art	City of Vincent	Women Inc	Jennie Feyen
Virtual Reality, 360° or Augmented Reality	XR:WA	A Quiet Day in the Hall	Christopher Young
Virtual Reality, 360° or Augmented Reality	XR:WA	Beyond The Milky Way	Jess Black
Virtual Reality, 360° or Augmented Reality	XR:WA	Galup VR Experience	Poppy van Oorde-Grainger
Virtual Reality, 360° or Augmented Reality	XR:WA	Isle of Trials: Curse of the Fire God	Ready Team One
Virtual Reality, 360° or Augmented Reality	XR:WA	MPA Skills – “Try a Trade” Program	Ben Dalhstrom, Andrea Conte
Web Series or Online Content	RevStream	Capturing The Fire	Samantha Marlowe, Frances Elliott
Web Series or Online Content	RevStream	Making Dalison	Emma Pegrum
Web Series or Online Content	RevStream	The View From Here	Emma Pegrum
Web Series or Online Content	RevStream	Walking Man	Brendan Hutchens

==== 2023 ====
AWARD	PRESENTED BY	TITLE	PRODUCER
Narrative Feature Film with budget under $1m		Frank and Frank	
Narrative Feature Film with budget under $1m		Rampage Electra	
Narrative Feature Film with budget under $1m		Sweet Rhythm	
Narrative Feature Film with budget under $1m		Violett	
Narrative Feature Film with budget over $1m		He Ain't Heavy	
Narrative Feature Film with budget over $1m		It Only Takes A Night	
Feature Documentary / Non Fiction		Black Cockatoo Crisis	
Feature Documentary / Non Fiction		Dolphins: Is Our Love Too Deep?	
Feature Documentary / Non Fiction		The Last Song	
Short Film / Animation		An Origin of Rape Culture	
Short Film / Animation		Bird Drone	
Short Film / Animation		Making Waves	
Short Film / Animation		Max Pam: The Freddie Incident	
Short Film / Animation		Tee Ken Ng	
Short Film / Animation		The Grey Line	
Student Film		Student Film	
Student Film		Dare to Dream	
Student Film		Diary of Death	
Student Film		Injustice	
Student Film		Melody of Life	
Student Film		School Makes Me…	
Student Film		Tea’s Ready	
Television		Claremont – A Killer Among Us	
Television		New Leash on Life	
Television		Ningaloo Nyinggulu	
Music Video		Anna Schneider – Lyrebird	
Music Video		Booxkid – The Battle	
Music Video		Bad Weather – Flowers in Your Room	
Music Video		Moana – Kingdom and Temple	
Music Video		Studio Orange – Healthy Hygiene Behaviours	
Game Design		Nekograms	
Game Design		Tactical Response: PVP, Apocalypse and Genesis	
Commercial Content		2023 Certified Organic Vintage – Voyager Estate, Margaret River	
Commercial Content		Kaleep	
Commercial Content		Raith Skateboards – World Record Attempt	
Commercial Content		Real Good Honey – Nothing to Hide	
Commercial Content		Wizard Pharmacy: Xmas Rap!	
Commercial Content		World Transplant Games 2023	
Moving Image and Installation		A Leap of Faith	
Moving Image and Installation		LightWaves	
Virtual Reality, 360° or Augmented Reality		Bidi Walbraaniny – Path to Healing	
Virtual Reality, 360° or Augmented Reality		BoodjAR	
Virtual Reality, 360° or Augmented Reality		Tactical Response: PVP, Apocalypse and Genesis	
Virtual Reality, 360° or Augmented Reality		The Careful Project – Kiera Jas – Thoughts	
Virtual Reality, 360° or Augmented Reality		Wiluna Martu Ranger VR – Protecting Culture and Country	
Web Series or Online Content		Dr Russell’s World of Curiosities	
Web Series or Online Content		Love Me Lex	
Web Series or Online Content		Puntukurnu – Smoking Aware	
Web Series or Online Content		Cool Mum	

=== Outstanding Achievement ===
Winners are highlighted with yellow shading and bold type.

==== 2020 ====
AWARD	PRESENTED BY	NOMINEE	TITLE
Directing	The Backlot Perth	Miley Tunnecliffe	Calling
Directing	The Backlot Perth	Alison James	Judas Collar
Directing	The Backlot Perth	Cathy Henkel, Sam Lara	Laura’s Choice
Cinematography or Visualisation		Michael McDermott	Judas Collar
Cinematography or Visualisation		Radheya Jegatheva	The Quiet
Cinematography or Visualisation		Ben Berkhout	Yulubidyi – Until The End
Writing		Alison James	Judas Collar
Writing		Radheya Jegatheva, Jay Jay Jegathesan	The Quiet
Writing		Nathan Mewett, Curtis Taylor	Yulubidyi – Until The End
Performance			Antecedents
Performance			Carmentis
Performance			Yulubidyi – Until The End
Production Design		Shane Devries	100% Wolf
Production Design		Emma Fletcher	Carmentis
Production Design		Stephanie Davis	Yulubidyi – Until The End
Editing	Sandbox	Frances Elliott	Abduction
Editing	Sandbox	David Vincent Smith	I’m Not Hurting You
Editing	Sandbox	Lawrie Silvestrin	Judas Collar
Sound	Soundbyte	James Brock, Nick Gallagher, Talen Herzig	Abduction
Sound	Soundbyte	Radheya Jegatheva	The Quiet
Sound	Soundbyte	Tim Bott, Ben Morton	Yulubidyi – Until The End
Original Music		Josh Hogan	Below
Original Music		Ash Gibson-Greig	Everybody Gets Stabbed
Original Music		Ben Morton, Mike Sukys	Yulubidyi – Until The End

==== 2021 ====
AWARD	PRESENTED BY	NOMINEE	TITLE
Directing		David Vincent Smith	Abiogenesis
Directing		Miley Tunnecliffe	In Australia
Directing		Jacqueline Pelczar	Sparkles
Directing		Martin Wilson	Stop The Coward Punch
Directing		Renée Webster	Structural
Directing		Karla Hart	Tooly
Directing		Poppy van Oorde-Grainger	Two Sands
Cinematography or Visualisation	City of Fremantle	David Vincent Smith, Lewis Potts	Abiogenesis
Cinematography or Visualisation	City of Fremantle	Jim Frater	In Australia
Cinematography or Visualisation	City of Fremantle	Leighton De Barros	Jaime Hudson From Sky to Sea
Cinematography or Visualisation	City of Fremantle	Jim Frater	Stop The Coward Punch
Cinematography or Visualisation	City of Fremantle	Lewis Potts	Two Sands
Cinematography or Visualisation	City of Fremantle	Hugh Miller	Under the Volcano
Writing		Miley Tunnecliffe	In Australia
Writing		Taihra Swaine	Peanut
Writing		Tina Fielding	Sparkles
Writing		Karla Hart	Tooly
Writing		Poppy van Oorde-Grainger and Kook Manuer	Two Sands
Performance	PAC Screen Workshops	Karin Kowi	In Australia
Performance	PAC Screen Workshops	Joanna Tu	Peanut
Performance	PAC Screen Workshops	Jay Jay Jegathesan	Soul Catcher
Performance	PAC Screen Workshops	Emily Rose Brennan	Tent Girl
Performance	PAC Screen Workshops	Garang John Deng	Two Sands
Design		Kate Separovich, Kate Anderson, Texx Montana	Evie
Design			Fading Numbers
Design		Nina Gee	Hold Up
Design		Emma Fletcher	Itch
Design		Emma Vickery	Two Sands
Editing	Sandbox	Caitlan O’Connor	In Australia
Editing	Sandbox	Radheya Jegatheva	Painting By Numbers
Editing	Sandbox	Elaine Smith	Sparkles
Editing	Sandbox	Dominic Pearce	Two Sands
Sound	Soundbyte	Adrian Vinci and Josh Hogan	Girl Like You
Sound	Soundbyte	Alexander Blocher, Ben Cowman, Ric Curtin, Morgan Dufour, Glenn Martin, Benjamin Morris, John Simpson, Lisa Simpson, Gavin Repton, Trevor Hope	Itch
Sound	Soundbyte	Brad Habib and Shaun Sandosham	Murder on the Dancefloor
Sound	Soundbyte	Steeve Body	Painting By Numbers
Sound	Soundbyte	Nicholas Gallagher	Sparkles
Sound	Soundbyte	Nick McKenzie, Josh Hogan & Ned Beckley	Two Sands
Original Music		Stephan Callan	In Australia
Original Music		ZĀN (Zain Awan)	These Walls
Original Music		Piers Burbrook de Vere	Under The Volcano

==== 2022 ====
2022 saw the introduction of a split in the Performance category into "Over 18" and "Under 18". The listings are:

AWARD	PRESENTED BY	NOMINEE	TITLE
Directing	The Backlot Perth	Renee Webster	How To Please A Woman
Directing	The Backlot Perth	Dominic Pearce	Making Dalison
Directing	The Backlot Perth	Martin Wilson	Pieces
Directing	The Backlot Perth	Ella Wright	Stage Changers
Directing	The Backlot Perth	Jennie Feyen	Touch
Directing	The Backlot Perth	Luna Laure	Walking Man
Directing	The Backlot Perth	Ben Young	Where All Light Tends To Go
Cinematography or Visualisation	Raz Rentals	Claire Leach	Choice
Cinematography or Visualisation	Raz Rentals	Rick Rifici	Facing Monsters
Cinematography or Visualisation	Raz Rentals	Lewis Potts	Mettle
Cinematography or Visualisation	Raz Rentals	Jim Frater	Pieces
Cinematography or Visualisation	Raz Rentals	Darren McCagh, Andre Rerekura	Shipwreck Hunters Australia
Cinematography or Visualisation	Raz Rentals	Christian Kennedy	Struggling Songlines
Writing		Ian Wilkes and Poppy van Oorde-Grainger with an oral history from Doolann-Leisha Eatts	Galup VR Experience
Writing		Renee Webster	How To Please A Woman
Writing		Donna Hughes	Isolation in Lockdown
Writing		Peter Williams and Chantelle Naude	Match Made
Writing		Ian Wilkes and Poppy van Oorde-Grainger	Ngaluk Waangkiny
Performance Individual including voice		Hayley McElhinney	How To Please A Woman
Performance Individual including voice		Peter Williams	Match Made
Performance Individual including voice		Alex Arco	Pieces
Performance Individual including voice		Megan Aspinall	Pieces
Performance Individual including voice		Monique Wilson	Pieces
Performance Individual including voice		Emma Booth	Where All Light Tends To Go
Performance Individual including voice		Della Rae Morrison	Wirnitj
Performance under 18	The Ali Roberts Studio	Lauren Campbell	(Not So) Great Expectations
Performance under 18	The Ali Roberts Studio	Saffron Bell	Choice
Performance under 18	The Ali Roberts Studio	Allegra Teo	Pieces
Performance under 18	The Ali Roberts Studio	Jasmine Lucas	Pieces
Performance under 18	The Ali Roberts Studio	Tjiirdm McGuire	Wirnitj
Production Design (incl costume, set design, hair and make up)		Alzbeta Rekosh	Choice
Production Design (incl costume, set design, hair and make up)		Emma Fletcher	How To Please A Woman
Production Design (incl costume, set design, hair and make up)		Christian Kennedy	Modern Clocks
Production Design (incl costume, set design, hair and make up)		Dennon Pike, Monique Wilson, Kristie Rowe, Tess Rowe, Shannon Murphy	Pieces
Production Design (incl costume, set design, hair and make up)		Nathan Stone + Stuart Campbell	Slasher Squad
Editing	Sandbox	Merlin Eden	How To Please A Woman
Editing	Sandbox	Lawrie Silvestrin	Pieces
Editing	Sandbox	John McGovarin	Redzone
Editing	Sandbox	Chris Trappe	Stage Changers
Editing	Sandbox	Frances Elliott	Walking Man
Sound	Soundbyte	Xoe Baird, Ric Curtin, Jeremy Ashton	Facing Monsters
Sound	Soundbyte	Intentionally omitted names	Freedom Swimmer
Sound	Soundbyte	Jason North, Ned Beckley, Josh Hogan, Lucy Torvaldsen	Shipwreck Hunters Australia
Sound	Soundbyte	Jason North, Ned Beckley, Josh Hogan, Tom Allum	Walking Man
Sound	Soundbyte	Ric Curtin, Xoe Baird, Les Fiddess, Terri Bellem	Where All Light Tends To Go
Original Music	RTRFM	Sean Tinnion	Laugh With Me
Original Music	RTRFM	Marc Earley	Making Dalison
Original Music	RTRFM	Oscar Millar	Immortal
Original Music	RTRFM	Cameron Deyell	Namarali
Original Music	RTRFM	Tim Count	Pieces
Original Music	RTRFM	Mathew ‘Cheeky’ Cheetham	Walking Man
Original Music	RTRFM	Adam Spark	Where All Light Tends To Go

2023

AWARD	PRESENTED BY	NOMINEE	TITLE
Directing		Anthony Barwell	Claremont – A Killer Among Us
Directing		David Vincent Smith	He Ain’t Heavy
Directing		Jessica Bailey	I’m Not a Nurse
Directing		Christian Horgan	Making Waves
Directing		Kaleb McKenna	Raising Thunder
Directing		Ella Wright	Tee Ken Ng
Cinematography or Visualisation		Radheya Jegatheva	Bird Drone
Cinematography or Visualisation		Lewis Potts	He Ain’t Heavy
Cinematography or Visualisation		Damian Fasolo	I’m Not a Nurse
Cinematography or Visualisation		Christian Kennedy	Marlu Man
Cinematography or Visualisation		Rhys Jones	Tee Ken Ng
Writing		Clare Toonen	Bird Drone
Writing		Lata Periakarpen	Good Fortune
Writing		David Vincent Smith	He Ain’t Heavy
Writing		Callan Durlik	It Only Takes A Night
Writing		Sanja Katich	Love Me Lex
Writing		Tim Winton, Peter Rees	Ningaloo Nyinggulu
Performance		Myles Pollard	Frank and Frank
Performance		Greta Scacchi	He Ain’t Heavy
Performance		Sam Corlett	He Ain’t Heavy
Performance		Christine Ayo	I’m Not a Nurse
Performance		Ana Ika	It Only Takes A Night
Performance		Sarah Light	Love Me Lex
Performance Under 18s		Koko Kelemete	A Novel Christmas
Performance Under 18s		Chloe Brink	Raising Thunder
Performance Under 18s		Valentina Blagojevic	Violett
Performance Under 18s		Lauren Campbell	When Doves Fly
Production Design (incl. costume, set design, hair and makeup etc)		Casey Renzullo, Kayleigh Lux	A Novel Christmas
Production Design (incl. costume, set design, hair and makeup etc)		Emma Fletcher	He Ain’t Heavy
Production Design (incl. costume, set design, hair and makeup etc)		Johnny Ma	It Only Takes A Night
Production Design (incl. costume, set design, hair and makeup etc)		Stephanie Davis	The Redemption
Production Design (incl. costume, set design, hair and makeup etc)		Helena Polley	Violett
Editing		Saxon Wright	Good Fortune
Editing		Antony Webb	He Ain’t Heavy
Editing		Oliver Dear	Love Me Lex
Editing		David Vincent Smith	Tee Ken Ng
Editing		Scott Quayle	The Grey Line
Sound or Sound Design		Ben Morris, Kim Lord	Claremont: A Killer Among Us
Sound or Sound Design		Ben Morton	I’m Not a Nurse
Sound or Sound Design		Nick Gallagher	It Only Takes A Night
Sound or Sound Design		Ric Curtin, Xoe Baird, Glenn Martin, Brett Stayt, Elizabeth Parer-Cook, Marcus Lorenz	Ningaloo Nyinggulu
Sound or Sound Design		Brad Habib, Holly Miller, Jake Isard, Tam Glover, Brendan Hill, James Brock	Raising Thunder
Original Music		Andrew James Bartlett	A Novel Christmas
Original Music		Nicholas Gardiner	An Origin of Rape Culture
Original Music		Ben Morton	I’m Not a Nurse
Original Music		Robert Woods	Raising Thunder
Original Music		Steven J. Mihaljevich, Ben Chase	Violett
