= Raw Nerve Short Film Initiative =

Australian film sponsorship venture

Raw Nerve Short Film Initiative was a joint venture between Screen Development Australia (SDA) and Screen Australia (formerly the Australian Film Commission) that awards Australian filmmakers sponsorship to encourage film production.

The program funds the creation of short films on a low budget by emerging filmmakers and then tours the films throughout Australia at the end of a years work. It was created to address the sponsoring organisations' objective of showcasing new talent via organizations in each state.

The scheme is run in New South Wales through Metro Screen, in Victoria through Open Channel, in Queensland through QPIX, in South Australia Media Resource Centre, in Western Australia through Film and Television Institute, in Tasmania through Wide Angle Tasmania.

During 2002 there were 29 short films produced using approximately seven-hundred cast and crew. The successful filmmakers in 2003 were given a small amount of money, two days equipment hire and two days post-production facilities. In 2003 $150,000 came from the AFC and $75,000 was contributed by SDA organizations.

== List of selected filmmakers ==
2012

- Liz Tomkins – Tender (Qld)

2011

- Adam Ransley – Dibs (Tas)
- Ninna Millikin – Piercing Silence (Tas)
- David Pyefinch – Showing the Ropes (Tas)
- Thomas Wright – "Burrowed Frowns" (Metro)
- Samuel Bartlett – " Grand Design" (Metro)
- Samuel Faull – "I Spy" (Metro)
- Jo-Anne Brechin – "This Dog's Life" (Metro)
- Phoebe Hartley – "Switch" (Open Channel)
- Daniel Deparis – " Phone Call" (Open Channel)
- Corrie Chen – "Bruce Lee Played Badminton Too" (Open Channel)

2010

- Rebecca Thomson – Slashed (Tas)
- Sara Pensalfini Brown – Exit, Pursued By a Bear (Tas)
- Daniel Speed – Thicker Than Water (Tas)
- Alexandra Blue, Amber McBride, Nikki Wieland – "Daddy, Daddy" (SA)
- Chad Leader, Nima Nabili Rad – "Beta" (SA)
- Madeleine Parry & Daniel Joyce – "Murder Mouth" (SA)
- Christine Williams, Gareth Wilkes & Patrick Rees – "The Window" (SA)
- Casper Zielono and Cameron Thompson – "Beware Drop Bears" (WA)
- Neale Crawford – "Innocent Andy" (WA)
- Cassandra Nguyen and Tamara Small – "Play Lunch" (WA)
- Josh Mawer – "Gone" (Metro)
- Erin Good – "Abbie" (Metro)
- Benjamin Brink – "Sal"(Metro)
- Alexandra Edmondson – "The Burnt Cork" (Metro)

2009

- Dominique Hurley & Justus Neumann – Water (Tas)
- Marisa Mastrocola – Daughter of San Dominico (Tas)
- Bernard Lloyd – Tin Man (Tas)
- Jasmine Cameron – The Gardener (Tas)
- Michael Clarkin & Sarah McLauchlan – "A World Away" (SA)
- Ben Crisp & Miles Rowland – "Don't Blame Me" (SA)
- Seth Williams & Luke Marsden – "Things Have Changed" (SA)
- Claire Harris & Sean Riley – "Lure" (SA)
- Tasha Stephenson and Mel Judkins – "I will NOT be Outbid" – (WA)
- Phillip Walker and Oriellie Tylor – "Trash Out" (WA)
- Penny Bedford and Megan Riley – "The Washing line" – (WA)
- Jules Duncan – "Cashed Up Bogans' (WA)
- Megan Palinkas – "crows Feet" (WA)
- Roy Weiland – "Barton the Ghost Catcher" (Metro)
- Genevieve Clay – "Francis and Annie" (Metro)
- Sam McKeith – "Hinterland" (Metro)
- Sarah-Mace Dennis – "Rebel Wessex" (Metro)

2008

- Paul Searles – Butterfingers (NSW)
- Ngaire O'Leary – Homecoming (NSW)
- Daren Nair – Body Dysmorphic (NSW)
- Lisa Kowalski – The Last Cherry (NSW)
- Vivien Mason – Iron Will (Tas)
- Dan Weavell – Help Wanted (Tas)
- Shaun Wilson & Tim Logan – Henry Finn (Tas)
- Rose Schramm – Next of Kin (Tas)
- Mark Aldeson and Crystal McCallum – "Strings" (WA)
- Gary Sewell and Vanessa Demaine – "Shatter" (WA)
- Rowan Crosby and Christina Yiannakis – "Contact" (WA)
- Christine Sistrunk – "The Nappy Tree" – (WA)
- Julia Ngeow and Gregg Johnson – "Victims" (WA)

2007–8

- Matt Hawkins & Bettina Hamilton – "Casual Living" (SA)
- Nick Bollard, Travis Kaledra, Felice Burns – "Family Business" (SA)
- Simone Mazengarb, Bowen Ellames, Sylvia Warmer – "Daniel" (SA)
- Michael Zeitz & Jane Baird – "Killjoy" (SA)
- Scott Eathorne – "Selling Hopkins" (WA)
- Will Falconer and Annabelle Fouchard – "Clouds" – (WA)

2006–7

- Luci Temple – Don't Panic! (NSW)
- Carol Williamson – What I'll Be When I Grow Up (NSW)
- Rozamund Waring – Clydesdale – The Horse That Built The Nation (NSW)
- Jacqueline Archer – Beneath The Tides (NSW)
- Sarah Crowest – "Caught in a Loop" (SA)
- Adam Lemmey – "Hard Rubbish" (SA)
- Dave Wade – "Dead End" (SA)
- Charlotte Hamlyn – "Mona" (SA)
- Richard Hatwell – "The Hunt" – (WA)
- Alistair McNaughton – "The Dance" (WA)
- Salam Zuisdras – "Chess" (WA)

2005–6

- Simon Blythe – Father's Day (NSW)
- Irena Dangov – "Aunt Joan's Friendly Grotto" (SA)
- Mark Fantasia – "Destinations" (SA)
- Jo Zealand & Michael Clarkin – "Like You Do..." (SA)
- Aaron Schuppan & Matt Salleh – "Shirt" (SA)
- Trevor Wright – "Train Runner" (SA)
- Michael Rautao and Kirsten Twining – "Jack in a Box"(WA)
- Tony Merriweather and McGee Noble – "A Walk in the Hills" (WA)
- Serena Ryan and Tracey Spark – "Best Kept Secret" (WA)
- Les Carol and Heather Robinson – "The Good Muslim" (WA)

2004

- Jason Chong – "Meteor Shower" (SA)
- Tim Rockk – "Disconnected" (SA)
- Albert Jamae – "Beat It" (SA)
- Lisa McDonald and Denise Wilson – "Hard Rubbish" (SA)
- Storm Ashwood – "Sleeping with the Light On" (SA)
- Arthur James Tsiakas – "Big Fat Greek Fag" (SA)
- Janine Boreland – "Picture Showman" (WA)
- Teja Hudson and Kye Leslie – "Framer" (WA)
- Dani Little and Adam Gould ' "Parvulus Natu"(WA)
- Hugh Butterworth and John Small – "Within Security" – (WA)
- Kate Vyvyan and Ian Tregonning – "Island of Wild Hope" (WA)

2003

- Jackie Loeb – Girls at Beach with Mum (NSW)
- Aaron Kajanto – "True Blue" (SA)
- Pelham Andrews & Jonathon Woolven – "The Kadina Policeman" (SA)
- Sheridan Stewart & Jeanette Wildwood – "Baubo" (SA)
- Ryan Walters – "Jasmine Jackson" (SA)
- Catherine Purling – "My Surfer Boy" (SA)
- Gretchen Mercedes – "Blue" (SA)
- Antonio Barimen – "The Escape"(WA)
- Jillian Claver – "Kaden's Room"(WA)
- Carrie Crookes – "The Opposite Sex"(WA)
- Lindsay Hallam – "The State of Things"(WA)
- Timothy Merks – "Existence"(WA)

2002

- Christine Armstrong – In The Family (NSW)
- Bianca Barling – "I've Never Walked Out on a Movie Before" (SA)
- Chris Rieckmann – "8 Orient Road" (SA)
- Steve Lockley – "Trick or Treat" (SA)
- Greg Osbourne – "The Club" (SA)
- Brendan Richards – "Nastyboy" (SA)
- Anna Bennetts – "Chiko Roll"(WA)
- Kazmir Sas – "Killing Candy"(WA)
- Nicholas Langoulant – "The Fish who saw God" (WA)
- Christopher Kenworthy – "Dreamer"(WA)
- Shaun Patten – "Guests and Fish" (WA)
- Peter Templeman – "Gifted Thumbs"(WA)
- Jennifer Janieson – "Lens" (WA)
- Olivia Herring – "Three's a Crowd"(WA)

== See also ==
- Adam Bayliss

== Sources ==
- Australian Film Commission – NewsAndEvents
- METRO SCREEN Raw Nerve Initiative
- ACMI
- Open Channel (online)
- Media Resource Center
