= West Australian Screen Awards =

Defunct film awards in Western Australia

The West Australian Screen Awards (WASA) were a film awards in Western Australia presented by FTI (Western Australia). Commencing in 1987, they were not held in 2012, before recommencing in 2013 and finally being cancelled in 2016. The awards were significant points in the careers of a number of Australian film professionals and companies. In 2020 the Western Australia Screen Culture Awards developed in their absence.

== See also ==
- Film industry in Western Australia
- Cinema of Australia
