= Redback =

Redback, Red Back or Red-back may refer to:

== Companies ==
- Redback Aviation, an Australian aircraft manufacturer
- Redback Boots, Australian footwear manufacturing company
- Redback Networks, telecommunications equipment company

== Sports ==
- West End Redbacks or Southern Redbacks, the South Australia cricket team based in Adelaide
- Frankfurt Redbacks, Australian rules football club based in Frankfurt, Germany
- Glasgow Redbacks, Australian rules football club based in Glasgow, Scotland
- Romsey Football Club, nickname Redbacks, Australian rules football club based in Romsey, Victoria, Australia

== Finance ==
- Texas redbacks, paper money issued between 1839 and 1840 in the Republic of Texas
- Australian twenty-dollar note, sometimes referred to as a redback
- Renminbi, the Chinese currency is sometimes referred to as redback in contrast to US dollar

== Other uses ==
- Redback, working title of the 2010 Australian film Raven's Cabin
- Redback (armoured vehicle), Australian infantry fighting vehicle, version of the Korean K21
- Redback (comics), a comic book superhero
- Redback spider (Latrodectus hasselti), species of spider found in Australia
