= Aaron McCann =

Australian filmmaker, writer, and novelist

- Born: Ireland
- Occupations: Filmmaker, writer, director, novelist
- Years active: 2003–present
- Known for: Top Knot Detective, Koko: A Red Dog Story, Henry & Aaron's 7 Steps to Superstardom, Hug the Sun

Aaron McCann is an Irish-born Australian filmmaker, writer, and novelist. He is best known for co-directing the cult mockumentary Top Knot Detective (2016), the documentary Koko: A Red Dog Story (2019), and his work in the comedy duo Henry and Aaron. He is the founder of the production company Banshee Hills, through which he produces feature films and digital content. His projects have been distributed by Umbrella Entertainment, Village Roadshow, and SBS Viceland, and his web content has garnered millions of views. In 2023 he, along with writer Dominic Pearce, published their first novel, Big Red.

== Career ==
=== Early work and the Henry and Aaron duo ===
McCann began his on-screen career in Perth, collaborating with filmmaker/comedian Henry Inglis as the duo Henry and Aaron. Their work included the Foxtel series Henry & Aaron's 7 Steps to Superstardom (2011) and their YouTube and ABC iView Christmas specials. Their absurdist comedy style earned them a cult following in Australian online comedy, while their online videos, It's a Snap! and Set Yourself Free, have collectively gained over 24 million views online.

=== Film ===
McCann's early short film Perished (2011), a zombie thriller, screened at both the Revelation Perth International Film Festival and the SXSW Film Festival in 2012.

His TV feature debut, Top Knot Detective (co-directed with Dominic Pearce), premiered on SBS (Australian TV channel) and later at the Sydney Film Festival and Fantastic Fest and was released by on Blu-ray by Third Window Films in the UK and by Umbrella Entertainment and Vinegar Syndrome in the USA. The film, a parody of 1980s Japanese TV, gained a dedicated fan base. His follow-up, Koko: A Red Dog Story (2019), was a documentary spin-off of the Australian film Red Dog (film).

=== Television and online content ===
McCann has worked on:

- Henry & Aaron's 7 Steps to Superstardom (2011, MovieExtra & YouTube)- co-creator, co-writer, producer, performer
- The Heights (2019-2020, ABC) – Writer & Additional Assistant Director
- Hug the Sun (2021, YouTube) – A comedy webseries starring Aunty Donna, which he co-produced and directed.

=== Novel ===
Upon being shortlisted as a semifinalist for the Nicholl Fellowships in Screenwriting in 2019 alongside co-writer Dominic Pearce for the sci-fi/comedy Big Red, both McCann and Pearce began searching for finance for the film, but as the COVID-19 pandemic hit, the pair decided to turn their screenplay into their debut novel of the same name.

Author Amanda Bridgeman called it, "A rollicking Sci-Fi ride that hits all the right notes, with a touch of horror, and a barrel-load of laughs along the way."

The novel follows the crew of the Chronos One, Earth's first televised colonisation mission to Mars. But when their journey goes off course and the crew starts to turn on each other, the desperate group of reality TV show wannabes must fight to survive on this big red rock.

TV critic Travis Johnson called it "A savage satire set on the frontier of the red planet that, judging by our current grim age, might well prove to be all too prescient."

=== Banshee Hills (company) ===
In 2020, McCann founded Banshee Hills, a production company focused on genre films and digital content and is currently in production on a documentary about the life of screenwriter David Webb Peoples and his sole feature film The Salute of the Jugger.

=== Industry involvement ===
McCann served on the National Executive Committee of the Australian Writers' Guild (AWG) between 2019 and 2025, where he has advocated for screenwriters' rights and emerging talent development.

=== Awards and recognition ===
- 2011: Perished – Official Selection, SXSW Film Festival
- 2016: Top Knot Detective – Screened at Sydney Film Festival, Fantastic Fest
- 2019: Big Red - Semifinalist in the Nicholl Fellowships in Screenwriting part of the (Academy of Motion Picture Arts and Sciences). Big Red, which was later published as a novel in 2023 of a same name alongside co-writer Dominic Pearce
- 2021: Jonesy - Selected for Frontières Co-Production Market
- 2021: Hug the Sun - nominated for Best Short Form Comedy at the AACTA Awards
- 2025: Inspector Vengeance - Won Second Rounder Semi-Finalist for Best Comedy feature Screenplay at the Austin Film Festival Script Competition

== Filmography ==
=== Feature films ===
- Top Knot Detective (2016) – Co-director, writer, co-producer
- Koko: A Red Dog Story (2019) – Co-director, writer

=== Television and web ===
- Henry & Aaron's 7 Steps to Superstardom (YouTube & MovieExtra 2011) – Creator, writer, performer
- #7DaysLater (ABC, 2013) - performer
- The Heights (ABC, 2019–2020) – Writer, Additional AD
- Hug the Sun (YouTube 2021) – Director, producer
