= Jonathan Messer =

Australian film director (born 1976)

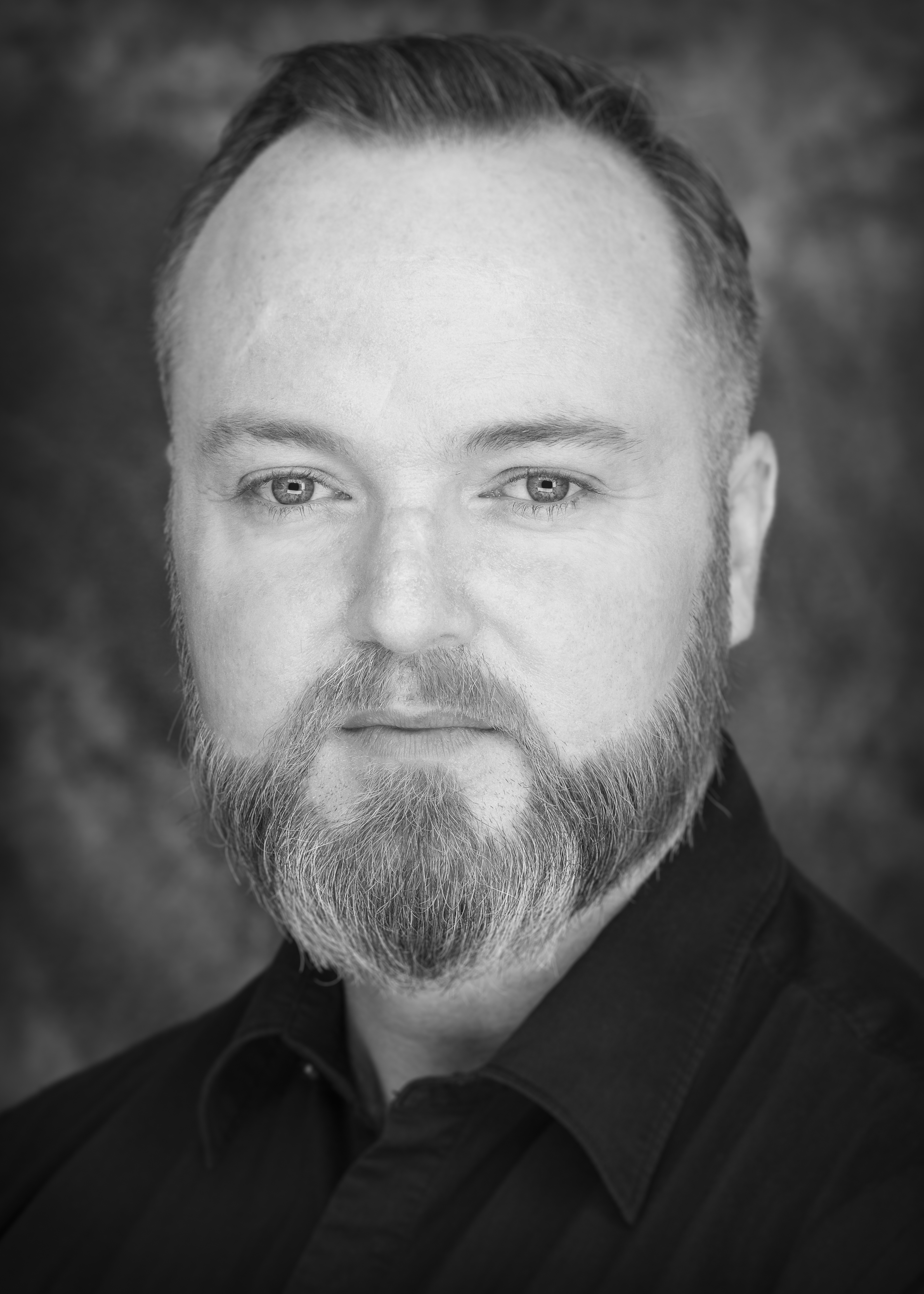
- Born: Jonathan William Arthur Messer; 17 March 1976 (age 50); Melbourne, Victoria, Australia
- Years active: 1990 – present

Jonathan Messer (born 17 March 1976 in Melbourne) is an Australian director of theatre, television and film.

== Early years ==
Jonathan Messer grew up in Beaumaris, a suburb of Melbourne, Victoria, Australia. Baptised a Catholic, at the age of five he began studying at Stella Maris Catholic Primary School. Messer began his theatrical career at St Martins Youth Arts Centre in Melbourne, where he appeared in various productions both acting and singing from the age of 12 to 15. He also appeared in various television commercials as a child. His secondary studies were at St Bede's College (Mentone), where he undertook his high school work-experience on the Australian drama series Neighbours.

== Career ==
Messer works as an Australian director/producer of film, television and theatre and holds a Doctor of Philosophy from the Western Australian Academy of Performing Arts. During his doctorate he was awarded the Edith Cowan University's Vice Chancellors award for Community Engagement, and produced and directed a 60-minute observational documentary film called It’s Not Just Me as the creative component of his practice-led research, taking four years to make. The film explores female to male gender transition, providing a complex narrative that investigates the rich life of four transgender men and those around them. It's Not Just Me won best LGBT documentary feature at the Atlanta International Documentary Film Festival in 2017. The film aired on SBS Viceland in Australia and SBS VOD and was rated 4.5 stars by The Curb and 5 Stars by Lezly Herbert from Out in Perth. The film screened at the Sydney Gay and Lesbian Mardi Gras Film Festival, Brisbane Queer Film Festival, Revelation Perth International Film Festival and was also screened as part of the History Trust of South Australia, History Festival.

Messer's professional theatre productions include Tejas Verdes by Fermin Cabal in 2006 with Red Stitch Actors Theatre following the successful run of Vincent in Brixton by Nicholas Wright. In 2005 Messer went to New York City where he was invited to The Sloan Film Summit at the Tribeca Film Institute, where he screened his short film Joshua Tree starring Taylor Dayne. Messer also worked as the Assistant Director to Jim Sharman in the production of Three Furies at the Sydney Opera House. He has also directed and produced music videos for the bands Tiltmeter, Nokturnal and 67 Special.

Messer trained in Los Angeles for three years, and developed his film making skills and experience studying film direction at the American Film Institute. He then worked as production assistant for the Kennedy-Marshall Company producing feature films such as Seabiscuit and The Bourne Supremacy. Before graduation from the MFA program in directing at the American Film Institute (AFI) in 2002, Messer underwent an internship at Killer Films in New York, working in pre-production on the Todd Haynes film Far from Heaven and the release of John Cameron Mitchell's film Hedwig and the Angry Inch. Messer also received a Queen Elizabeth Scholarship Trust (Australia) and an Ian Potter Foundation Grant to pursue his MFA (directing) at the American Film Institute. He is also a graduate director from the National Institute of Dramatic Art, in Sydney, and has also worked and in London at the BBC as an assistant director and Floor Assistant in both Drama and Light Entertainment on the shows Absolutely Fabulous, Top of the Pops, Blue Peter, The Hello Girls and Later… with Jools Holland. He also trained in single and multi-camera drama at the BBC.

== Personal life ==
Messer is also a photographer, a painter and a writer. Previously he was a health outreach worker for 6 years in a harm reduction project, working with street-based sex-workers in St Kilda, Victoria. He was born under the Zodiac sign of Pisces, the fish and is also a Justice of the Peace in the State of Western Australia, where he executes search warrants for police and witnesses affidavits for the public on a volunteer basis. He is also a mental health, disability, and inclusion advocate and is blind in his left eye. Messer is on the Diversity Leadership Group for Screenwest, Western Australia's primary film funding organisation.
