= Kate Raynes-Goldie =

- Born: Toronto, Canada

Kate Raynes-Goldie is a Canadian-New Zealand designer, writer, speaker, cultural anthropologist and who is widely regarded as Oceania's leading Lego Serious Play expert. She is known for her work on play and games for human connection, creativity and innovation. She is a regular media commentator, appearing on MTV, NPR and in the Australian Financial Review and Elle. She has a monthly technology and innovation column in the Business News, and is a regular contributor to Scitech's science and technology publication, Particle. Raynes-Goldie was the first Director of Interactive Programs at FTI and a past Senior Adjunct Research Fellow at Curtin University. She currently lectures at the Tokyo City University Program at Murdoch University.

== Early work ==
Raynes-Goldie is also known for her early work on how people understand, use and connect with each other on social media, in particular her ethnographic research on Facebook and privacy. She co-authored the first scholarly examination of friending on social networks.

Her PhD thesis was titled Privacy in the Age of Facebook: Discourse, Architecture, Consequences. The thesis was the 5th most downloaded thesis of all time from the Curtin University library repository as of July 2022.

Raynes-Goldie spoke at SXSW in 2007 on a panel with danah boyd on young people’s use of social media, amidst the then ongoing moral panic around young people “over sharing” online.

Raynes-Goldie received funding from the MacArthur Foundation's Digital Media and Learning Initiative, which resulted in her co-authored a chapter that examined young people's use of social media for activism and engagement in Civic Life Online, published by MIT press.

She was a contributor to Don Tapscott and Anthony D. Williams' Wikinomics Playbook in 2008.

== Play and games ==
Her games have been featured at international venues including IndieCade (San Francisco), Come Out and Play (New York), the National Theatre (London), Playpublik (Berlin), Fresh Air (Melbourne) and the Toronto International Film Festival's Sprockets (Toronto).

She gave a talk on play and games as enablers of connection at TEDxPerth.

Raynes-Goldie co-founded Atmosphere Industries, a game design studio and in 2007 co-created Ghost Town, an ARG aimed at exploring Perth.

In 2023, Raynes-Goldie was on a panel at the first SXSW Sydney on power of play along with Lego Masters' Ryan McNaught, Pasi Sahlberg and Nine Network's Ally Langdon.

== Education ==
She has a BA(hons.) in Philosophy and Semiotics from the University of Toronto and holds a PhD in internet studies from Curtin University.

== Awards ==
In 2016, she was awarded the Australian Computer Society's Digital Disruptors Awards' "ICT Professional of the Year", and also won WAITTA Incite's Achiever of the Year. In 2015 and 2016, she was named one of the 75 most influential women in the games industry in Australia and New Zealand by MCV and a finalist for Curtin University's Alumni Professional Achievement Award in Humanities.
