= Fremantle School building =

Heritage-listed building in Fremantle, Western Australia

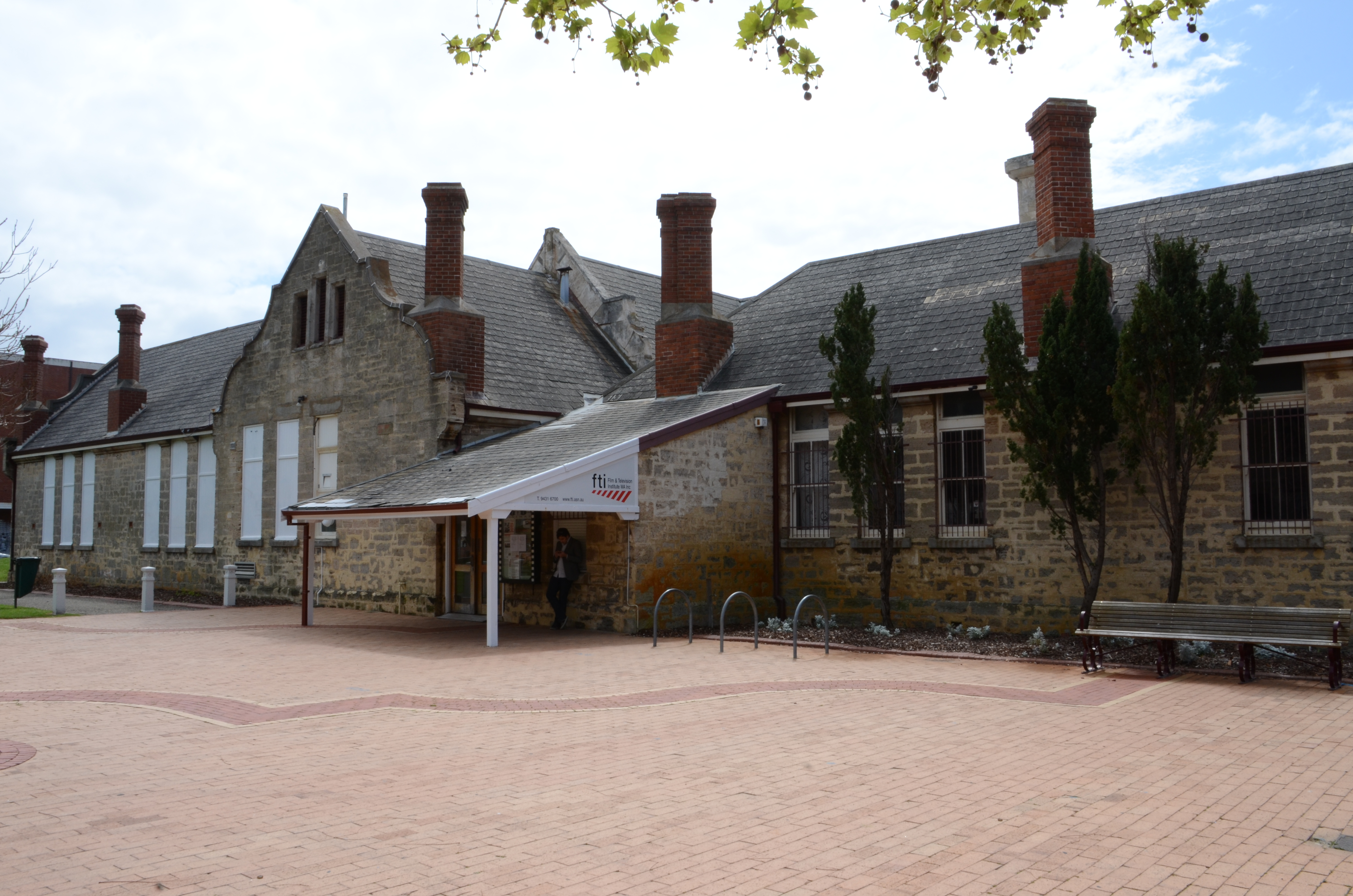
- Fremantle School building
- Interactive map of the Fremantle School building area

General information
- Type: Heritage-listed building
- Location: Fremantle, Western Australia
- Coordinates: 32.0508°S 115.7493°E

Western Australia Heritage Register
- Official name: Film and Television Institute
- Type: State Registered Place
- Designated: 6 March 1992
- Reference no.: 842

The Fremantle School building is a heritage-listed building located at 92 Adelaide Street, Fremantle. It was known for a long time by the name of its later occupants, the Film and Television Institute (also known as the Perth Institute of Film and Television).

The building was built to house the Fremantle School. It opened in 1854 and was later renamed to the Fremantle Boys' School. The building was designed by William Ayshford Sanford in the Victorian Tudor Style. Constructed using convict labour, the walls are limestone and the roof has Dutch gables with shingle covering. Additions were carried out in 1910 by the Public Works Department. The building was placed on the Register of National Estate in March 1972, and was given an interim listing on the State register in 1992. It was given permanent listing on the State register as part of the Princess May Reserve in 2001.

== History ==
In 1833, schools assisted by the Government were opened in Perth and Fremantle. These schools were called the Colonial Schools and they were open to all denominations of Christians. The Colonial Schools were designed to be for all children in the colony to use and to that end the cost of instruction was small, although the children had to provide their own slates and books. By 1850, the Education Board was discussing the problem of the non-suitability of rooms in use for the school at Fremantle and inquiring whether the Board could make arrangements for hiring or building a room giving better accommodation. The school accommodation proved so poor that the school was closed down in 1851.

By February 1852, the Resident Magistrate of Fremantle wrote to the Colonial Secretary on the subject of re-establishing the school. It is believed that the school was then moved to the Fremantle Mission House while preparations were under way for the new school. A letter sent by Mr Wright, the Master at the Colonial School in Fremantle in November 1852, demonstrated the great need for a new school building. Not only did he have to teach seventy-eight children by himself, with the possibility of the number being increased to 100 with the admittance of twenty-two pensioners' children, but the accommodation was very inadequate and that the '...erection of a school house at Fremantle is a positive necessity'. Tenders for building a school room at Fremantle were first printed in 1850 and the tenders for the carpenters' and joiners' work and the masonry (certain portions to be executed in limestone) as well as the tenders for quarrying the stone and performing the stone cutting for the dressings to the doors and windows were printed in March and October 1853. In 1852, the Legislative Council had voted £600, equivalent to A$104,692 in 2022, for the new school in Fremantle.

The design of the building is credited to William A Sanford, the then Colonial Secretary, who also served as Chairman of the Board of Education in the early 1850s. However, Considine and Griffiths Architects, in their report, Princess May Reserve Fremantle Conservation Plan (for WA Building Management Authority, 1995) state that the building was designed by James Austin. The school was completed by 1854, when The Inquirer and Perth Gazette both had small notices announcing its opening. The Inquirer has the opening date of the school as 16 October 1854 and, to celebrate the occasion, the children, led by the Master, Mr J Davis and headed by the Pensioner Band, marched to the school. At the time of its opening, the school was described by the Fremantle Inquirer as '...remarkably handsome but in our opinion far too expensive for what it was built for'.

Public Works Department (PWD) Plans for 1860, show there were additions to the Fremantle School, as do plans of 1869-70, where the architect was James Manning. The necessity for additions in 1870 are explained in the Legislative Council papers. The Governor, Fred A Ward, wrote that some Protestant parents were sending their children to the private Roman Catholic Schools in Fremantle because they thought that there they would receive an education superior to that given by the Government school at Fremantle. He admitted that the Government Fremantle Boys' School would not meet the requirements of the population without further extension and that '...indeed, I am now, at the urgent request of the Board, obliged to put the Colony to a considerable expense in providing additional school accommodation to satisfy the actual requirements of Fremantle'.

In the early 1890s, the Report on School Buildings found that, '...out of seventy-three Government school buildings, twenty were fair, thirteen bad and eleven very bad' and to change this, '...considerable sums have been expended in improving and enlarging many of the old school premises'. At this time, the Fremantle Boys' School had £336/19/11, equivalent to A$61,232.71 in 2022, spent on it for fencing and repairs, provided by the PWD. Note that the school was by now a boys' school, rather than the earlier school which was for both sexes. Fremantle Boys' School was again added to in 1898, because the increase in school attendance was so great that overcrowding had again been the result. To remedy the situation and to '...take away any ground for complaint', the Report on Education for 1898, noted that additions to the building were under way. These additions cost the PWD £1,521 and were tendered by F Warner.

Again in 1900, the school was added to, as were many other old schools in that year, but the additions were not as substantial as the ones of 1898, only costing the PWD £545. The additions reflected Western Australia's growth resulting from the goldrushes. Fremantle Boys' School was designated a central school starting in 1909. The idea of the central schools was to take children from contributory schools in the area and place them into either the commercial or industrial course. This system allowed the teachers to give the children more attention in their last two years of school. As a result of this new system, Fremantle Boys' required new rooms for the more effective teaching of science. Another addition at the time was probably a hall. New, better ventilated and brighter main halls were added to several large schools at that time, particularly those with attendances over 350 students. In 1910 Fremantle Boys' had an enrolment of 371. These extra works cost £A 1,649 and were completed on 13 June 1911.

The Headmaster of Fremantle Boys' School from 1864-89 was George Bland Humble and the school was sometimes referred to as Humble's School. Humble was Clerk of the City of Fremantle for nearly ten years, Town Clerk, Secretary of the Fremantle Building Society and Secretary of the Fremantle Masonic Lodge for over forty years. Another well known personage who went through the school was Thomas Blamey (later Sir Thomas Blamey, Australia's first Field Marshal), who taught there from 1903-06. In 1928, the increased number of students became too much for the school, so the younger children went to other schools in Fremantle and the Fremantle Boys' School became a high school. Fremantle Boys' School became an annexe of John Curtin Senior High School in 1956. In 1970 the school was described as 'deserted and ravaged by vandals', but, in 1973, the building was restored and leased by the Film and Television Institute (later shortened to FTI), who still occupy the building.

The building was registered on the Register of the National Estate on 21 March 1978, and gazetted with an interim entry on the state Register of Heritage Places on 6 March 1992.

== Description ==
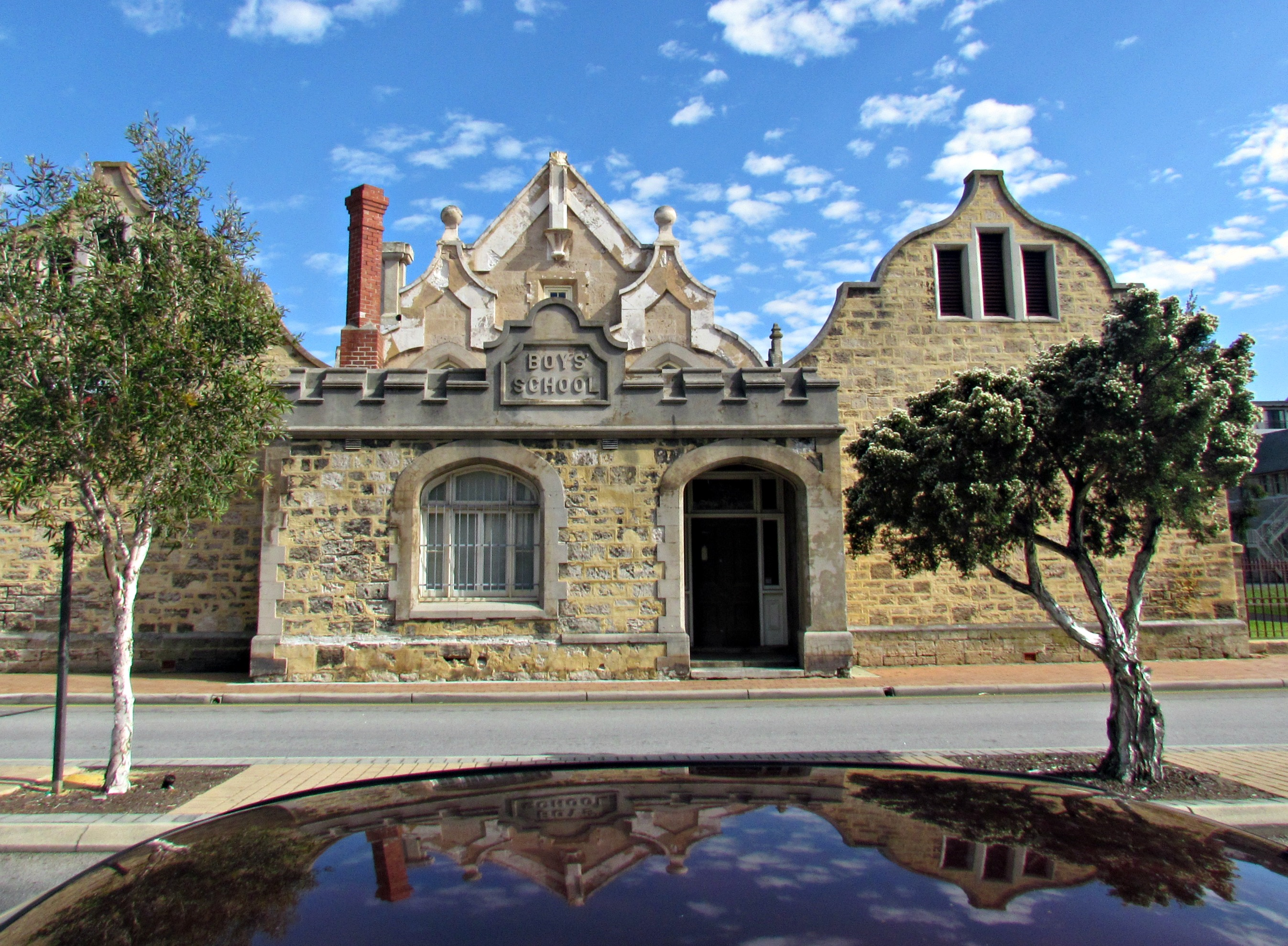
The building's dutch gables

This shingle roofed single storey limestone building in a Victorian Tudor style with Dutch gables, was constructed utilising convict labour. Additions were carried out by the PWD. The building was firstly constructed as a single room with a porch with curvilinear parapeted gables and finials. It has a steeply pitched roof supported on timber trusses and once had perimeter windows. It was a single room school with a large fireplace on the southern wall.

In 1871, James Manning designed the next addition in keeping with the original style. The first room was extended westward and two new classrooms were added to the north and south of this section. The area is now used as a library. In 1891, a verandah was added to the west face of the original room and included a set of lavatory basins. There is no evidence of this stage of work. The work was later removed in 1897. In 1898 Hillson Beasley's design for additional classrooms began to make the changes in planning. The scheme added three new classrooms that wrapped the original room. A fourth was added to the south-west corner. Beasley maintained the existing styling and materials. These classrooms encircle the hall and form the major visual addition to the original concept when viewed from Adelaide Street. It is these rooms that have the dominant curvilinear parapeted gables.

In 1900, the single classroom addition by Beasley completed the encircling of the original school room by filling the last gap to the northern side and required some demolition to make a connection. This room is clearly legible in the existing fabric. The school had a central hall and six classrooms at this stage. In 1901, Beasley designed a new classroom for the north-west corner to match a previous room added to the south-west corner, together with a small teacher's room in the centre of the south elevation which now constitutes the main entry to the present configuration.

In 1910-11, the works of 1910, under Beasley, virtually completed the school's growth with the addition of the science room, two new classrooms and a cloakroom. These additions had brick infill walls to allow for further expansion in the westerly direction; all rooms remain and have been subject to change. In 1912, the eastern porch and teacher's room were created in what is now the road reserve. This was the last campaign and completed the school. This room is now used as a conference room. In 1973, the present configuration of the building remains near to its 1901 shape, but the interiors were extensively remodelled by John Rowney to accommodate the Perth Institute of Film and Television. The main walls of the existing school were left in place, but many of the spaces have been re-configured.
