= Adam Bayliss =

Australian film director

Adam Bayliss (born 17 September 1979 in Wollongong, Australia) is an Australian producer of films. His films Luna and the Moon and Alex's Party have been shown at international film festivals, including the Palm Springs International Film Festival, the Canberra International Film Festival, the Australian International Film Festival, and the New York Gay & Lesbian Film Festival. Both deal with sexuality and gender identification.

He received funding from the Raw Nerve Initiative awarded by the Australian Film Commission, which provided financing for Luna and the Moon.

He launched production company Playback Entertainment in 2002 with colleague director Katie O'Neill.

Prior to becoming a producer of short films, Bayliss spent several years working in the art departments of Australian television dramas. Bayliss has also worked with Latent Image Productions and Rebelstudio in the development and production of various projects, including working on the 2001 film WillFull as Assistant to the Director.

In recent years he has produced several documentaries for Rebelstudio; "Sculpture by the Sea: 10th Anniversary", "Tommy Tomasi: A Life Well Travelled" and "Thredbo 50 Years". These documentaries are available through the Rebelstudio DVD store among other retailers, and have screened in numerous festivals and on Television in Australia.

== Bibliography ==
- Australian Film Commission, List of films by Adam Bayliss
- Australian Film Commission, Interview of Bayliss and Raw Nerve award description
- Adam Bayliss at IMDb
- Australian Film Commission, Raw Nerve Award (description)
- Metroscreen "Raw Nerve" discusses Bayliss
- The nominees for the 2002 International Emmy Awards (included WillFull)
- Playback Entertainment
- Rebelstudio

Luna and the Moon (Bayliss as producer)

- Indiflix.com "Luna and the Moon" (Producer)
- Australian Film Commission, "Luna and the Moon" (Producer)
- Newfest Filmguide (NY Gay & Lesbian Festival), "Luna and the Moon" (Producer)
- The Age (4 March 2006). "It's a big, wide, queer world". The Age.

Alex's Party (Bayliss as producer)

- Australian Film Commission, "Alex's Party" (Producer)
- Palm Springs Film Festival, "Alex's Party" (Producer)
- Canberra Short Film Festival, "Alex's Party" (Producer)
