= QPIX =

QPIX was an Australian not-for-profit film and television training organisation based in Brisbane. It closed in 2014.

== Description ==
QPIX was located in Annerley, an inner-city suburb of Brisbane, Queensland. The organisation provided career development for filmmakers and assistance developing and producing film and television projects. It received financial support from Screen Queensland at a state level and Screen Australia at a Federal level and offered opportunities to Queensland filmmakers through initiatives such as the Raw Nerve Short Film Initiative and the White Heat Short film program.

It was the Queensland member of Screen Development Australia (SDA), which also included Metro Screen (NSW), Open Channel (Vic), Media Resource Centre (SA), Wide Angle Tasmania (Tas) and FTI (WA).

== Closure ==
QPIX closed its doors in 2014 amid ongoing allegations of bullying, violence and discriminatory behaviour by its staff and students.

== Films ==
Past films developed by QPIX include:

Year	Title	Producer
2012	“Tender”	Liz Tomkins
2011	“Timing Light”	Semah Mokak-Wischki
2011	"Hot Chaps"	Tyronne Curtis
2011	"The Gordon Hookey Story"	Damien O'Mara
2011	"Free Rider"	Stephen Kanaris
2009	"Lamb Island"	Christopher Zaryc
