= Screenwest =

Screen funding and development organisation in Western Australia

Screenwest is Western Australia's screen funding and development organisation, working in partnership with the screen industry to develop, support and promote film, television and digital media production in Western Australia. Screenwest receives funding from the Government of Western Australia via Lotterywest. In July 2017 it took over the FTI (formerly Film and Television Institute).

== History ==
On 1 December 2016, Minister for Culture and Arts John Day announced that Screenwest would transition out of government, and become an independent not-for-profit organisation. This structural transition was completed on 20 July 2017, with Screenwest formally becoming Screenwest (Australia) Limited.

On 17 May 2017, Screenwest announced the proposed consolidation of FTI (Western Australia) (formerly Film and Television Institute) and Screenwest. Support for early career filmmakers in the form of a grants program transitioned from the FTI to Screenwest from July 2017, when the FTI ceased operations.

== Description ==
As WA's screen funding and development organisation, Screenwest works in partnership with the screen industry to develop, support and promote film, television and digital media production in WA. It receives funding from the Government of Western Australia and Lotterywest.

Screenwest's funding and support programs are designed to:

- Foster the development and production of quality, marketable film and television projects
- Expand the creative and professional development of Western Australia's film and television program makers
- Promote Western Australian screen culture

== See also ==
- Film and television financing in Australia
- List of film production companies
- List of television production companies
- Film industry in Western Australia
- Screen Australia
- Cinema of Australia
