= Henry and Aaron =

Australian comedy duo

- Occupation(s): Screenwriters, Directors, Actors
- Years active: 2003–present

Henry Inglis and Aaron McCann are a comedy duo from Perth, Western Australia, who produce and star in a series of Henry & Aaron digital short films.

The pair are best known for their web series, Henry & Aaron’s 7 Steps to Superstardom (2011), the Central Institute of Technology promotional video, It’s A Snap!, which gained international attention in February 2012, resulting in the pair being signed by Creative Artists Agency, and "Set Yourself Free" which has currently been viewed more than 20 Million times on YouTube.

== Career ==
Henry Inglis and Aaron McCann met whilst studying Film & TV at the Central Institute of Technology in 2003.

Several years later, they started producing and starring in a series of Henry & Aaron digital shorts, including The Yarising (2008), which featured Burleigh Smith, Taryn Leggett and Lee Jankowski.

In 2009, the pair teamed up with producer Lauren Elliott and together they founded Perth-based production company, Perfectly Adequate.

In December 2010, they produced Henry & Aaron’s Perfectly Adequate Christmas Special.

In January 2011, the trio won the inaugural Movie Extra Webfest, receiving $50,000 to produce a 7-part web series, Henry & Aaron's 7 Steps to Superstardom, which debuted on YouTube and the Movie Extra channel.

In February 2012, they produced It's A Snap! for the Central Institute of Technology, which went viral, achieving over two million international YouTube hits in one week and resulting in the trio being signed with Hollywood's leading talent agency, Creative Artists Agency (CAA).

In December 2013, Henry & Aaron’s ABC2 Xmas Quickie was commissioned by the ABC. The episode also stars James Helm as Danny ‘The Dynamite’ Danielson as well as Perth comedy stars, Ben Sutton, Liam Graham and Paul ‘Werzel' Montague who is reprising his role as Santa.

In January 2014, the pair released the PSA - Set Yourself Free which gained 10 million views in just under 5 days.

In 2015 Inglis and Elliott started Mad Kids a production company that has made exclusive content for ABC iView with programs like The Shapes (TV Series), The Legend of Gavin Tanner and DAFUQ?. McCann went on to create Top Knot Detective for SBS the same year

== Reception ==
Henry and Aaron were ranked by Zoo Weekly as among the Funniest People of 2012.

In December 2014 Rude Tube ranked Set Yourself Free #2 in their Best of 2014 video compilation.
