= Cigarette Girl (2009 film) =

- Theatrical release poster
- Directed by: Mike McCarthy
- Written by: Mike McCarthy
- Produced by: Jay Carl; Emmy Collins; Brett Magdovitz
- Starring: Cori Dials; Ivy McLemore; Helen Bowman; Danny Vinson
- Cinematography: Wheat (Stephen Buckley)
- Edited by: Wheat
- Music by: Scott Bomar; Jonathan Kirkscey
- Distributed by: Guerrilla Monster Films
- Release date: July 10, 2009 (Revelation Perth)
- Running time: 90 minutes
- Country: United States
- Language: English

Cigarette Girl is a 2009 film written and directed by Mike McCarthy and starring Cori Dials, Ivy McLemore, Helen Bowman, and Danny Vinson. The film premiered on July 10, 2009 at the Revelation Perth International Film Festival in Australia.

== Plot ==
In the not too distant future, society has levied laws against smoking and forced citizens to live in a certain part of town called the "Smoking Section" if one wants to smoke cigarettes. After crossing the line into the smoking ghetto, cigarettes now cost $63.49 a pack, and are sold on the street corners and underground bars. The unnamed heroine (Cori Dials) of the film works in the "Vice Club", an abandoned 1930s era cigarette factory turned club.

After her grandmother (Helen Bowman) is hospitalized with emphysema, the Cigarette Girl attempts to break her addiction to nicotine while also escaping the clutches of her employers, the mob-associated operators of the Vice Club. Deciding to start carrying a pistol, the Cigarette Girl stops smoking and starts killing on the third day to alleviate her acute psychological withdrawal manifested primarily by the ghost of a cowboy who is always on her back to keep smoking.

== Cast ==
- Cori Dials as The Cigarette Girl
- Helen Bowman as Grandma
- Ivy McLemore as Runaway
- Danny Venson as Cowboy
- D'Army Bailey as Store Owner
- James Buchanan as Johnny Valet
- Lynne Turley as Vice Boss
- J. Lazarus Hawk as Ace
- Donald Meyers as Doctor
- Christian B. Walker as Prophet/Dead Grass Boy #1
- Christopher Tyzhai Allen as Dead Grass Boy #2
- Markus Seaberry as Dead Grass Boy #3
- Emmy Collins as Suspicious Dude
- Lary Love Dolley as Hat Check Girl
- Daniel Lee as Customer
- Daniel Reed as Customer
- Glenn Payne as Customer
- Jacob Burcham as Customer

== Promotion ==
- World Premiere: Revelation Perth International Film Festival, July 2–12, 2009 in Perth, Australia
- US Premiere: Malco Theatres' Studio on the Square, Sept. 10, 2009 in Memphis, TN. Promoted by a collaboration between the On-Location Memphis & Indie Memphis Film Festivals.

== Reception ==
Variety said the film "is a hot low-budget mess, but fun." John Beifuss of The Commercial Appeal gave Cigarette Girl 3 1/2 out of 5 stars, calling it "signature McCarthy".
