= D'Army Bailey =

American judge and actor

- Bailey ca. 1971
- Born: November 29, 1941; Memphis, Tennessee, U.S.
- Died: July 12, 2015 (aged 73); Memphis, Tennessee, U.S.
- Education: Southern University; Yale University (1967)
- Occupations: lawyer, judge, activist, author, actor
- Employer(s): National Civil Rights Museum; Harvard University; Loyola Marymount University; Washington and Lee University; Washington University in St. Louis; University of Notre Dame

D'Army Bailey (November 29, 1941 – July 12, 2015) was an American lawyer, circuit court judge, civil rights activist, author, and film actor. Born and raised in Memphis, Tennessee, he served as a city councilman in Berkeley, California, from 1971 to 1973.

Bailey was the founder of the National Civil Rights Museum which opened in 1991 at Memphis’s Lorraine Motel, where Dr. Martin Luther King Jr. was slain in 1968. His 1993 book, Mine Eyes Have Seen: Dr. Martin Luther King’s Final Journey, focused on that period. A second book, The Education of a Black Radical, published in October 2009 by LSU Press, recalls Bailey's own history in the civil rights movement. His interest in civil liberties issues also led Bailey to film, where he portrayed a judge in the film The People vs. Larry Flynt (1996).

He had roles in seven other movies, including portrayals ranging from a minister to a street-hustling pool player. Bailey received his law degree from Yale Law School in 1967. He received an honorary Doctor of Laws degree from Clark University in Worcester, Massachusetts, in 2010. As a lawyer, he practiced for 16 years in Memphis before being elected as a judge in the Circuit Court of Tennessee's Thirtieth Judicial District in 1990. He presided over a nationally recognized trial lasting four months in 1999 in which three major tobacco firms were acquitted of wrongdoing in contributing to the deaths of smokers. He was twice nominated to serve on the Tennessee Supreme Court.

In September 2009, Bailey retired from the bench and became a member of Wilkes & McHugh, PA, a national civil litigation law firm, founded in 1985 by Jim Wilkes and Tim McHugh. In 2014, he was again elected to the bench and returned to office September 1, 2014. Bailey lectured at law schools, including Harvard Law School, Loyola Law School, Washington and Lee School of Law, Washington University School of Law, and Notre Dame Law School. He published legal articles at the law schools at Harvard, the University of Toledo College of Law, Washington and Lee, and Howard University School of Law. Bailey has served on the executive committee of the Tennessee Judicial Conference.

== Early years ==
Bailey was born in South Memphis and grew up near Mississippi Boulevard. He attended the segregated Booker T. Washington High School from 1955 to 1959, as Tennessee resisted desegregating its schools, as did numerous other southern states. Bailey attended the nation's largest historically black university, Southern University in Baton Rouge, Louisiana.

As president of the school’s freshman class, and for the next two years, Bailey was drawn into the fight against segregation. He joined actions such as a sit-in at a Greyhound bus station, picketing against discriminatory hiring practices at Baton Rouge businesses, and leading a march from the Southern University campus to downtown to support fellow students jailed for demonstrating. Bailey led a class boycott later, resulting in his expulsion. News of Bailey's ouster coursed through the civil rights community to Clark University in Worcester, Massachusetts, where sympathetic students had established a scholarship for a civil rights activist. The students raised $2,400 through community appeals, bake sales, and car washes to bring Bailey to Clark and continue his education.

At Clark, he helped organize and became director of the Worcester Student Movement. He invited and hosted Malcolm X as a guest speaker at Clark, worked briefly with Abbie Hoffman in the Worcester leftist movement's early days, and interacted with such civil rights and student activist icons as James Meredith, John Lewis, Tom Hayden, and Allard Lowenstein. The Worcester Student Movement was active tutoring students from the city’s low-income neighborhoods. It also picketed against a downtown department store Denholm and McKay for not employing blacks as clerks, and organized demonstrations against a city manufacturing company. Bailey began to understand the power of law in advancing change as he assisted with the filing of legal complaints with the federal government to halt discrimination in the city.

== Political involvement, public service ==
With his newly minted degree, Bailey worked in New York as national director of the Law Students Civil Rights Research Council, recruiting law students for civil rights legal work in the South. Later, he moved to San Francisco, California, to practice law. He was elected to the Berkeley City Council, where he served from 1971 to 1973. In the tumultuous politics of Berkeley, he pushed efforts to open new job opportunities and for expanding housing, recreational, and child-care programs for residents of the city next to the University of California campus. Eventually, he became ensnared in the divisive, politics that dominated Berkeley city government at the time, and he was recalled from the council in 1973.

== Memphis ==
In 1974 he returned to Memphis, where he opened a law practice with his brother, Walter Lee Bailey Jr. In 1982 Bailey became part of a group of attorneys and activists who raised $144,000 to buy the Lorraine Motel, site of the King assassination. It had gone to foreclosure and was being sold at auction on the steps of the Shelby County Courthouse.

A year later, Bailey made an unsuccessful run for Memphis mayor. He became more involved in working with others to preserve the motel and establish a civil rights museum there, organizing a foundation to raise money for this purpose. He served as the Board President from 1983 until the Museum opened in 1991. After lobbying to obtain public and private funding for the museum, Bailey resigned from its foundation board within months of the facility’s opening. Bailey said he felt fellow board members had lost sight of a central mission of the museum, which he felt was to inspire advances in civil rights. By then he had been elected as a circuit court judge. He said he envisioned the museum serving as a catalyst for activities aimed at what he said would “carry out the unfinished business of the civil rights movement”.

The museum complex's exhibits trace the story of the struggle for African-American civil rights from the arrival of the first Africans in the American colonies in 1619 through the assassination of King in 1968. A 2001 expansion acquired new buildings for the museum, including the former Bessie Brewer's rooming house at nearby 418 South Main Street, where the shot that killed Dr. King was allegedly fired. In 2014, the main motel building re-opened after a major renovation that upgraded exhibits, adding many interactive elements, and building systems.

== Law career ==
From 1976-83, he worked part-time for the Shelby County, Tennessee, public defender's office, representing defendants in dozens of cases. During this period he also wrote a weekly opinion column for the Commercial Appeal newspaper in Memphis. He hosted a local television program, Memphis Forum, and has appeared as a legal and political analyst for Court TV. Before he was first elected as a judge in 1990, he had practiced law for 16 years in Memphis. His general law practice represented clients in criminal and civil cases. Much of his casework was in personal injury law. Bailey served three terms as president of the Memphis chapter of the National Bar Association. He was elected to three judicial terms and was twice nominated to serve on the Tennessee Supreme Court.

After 19 years as a circuit court judge in Tennessee’s Thirtieth Judicial District, Bailey resigned Sept. 15, 2009 to resume a career as a civil trial lawyer. He focused on medical malpractice, nursing home liability, and catastrophic injury. Bailey joined Wilkes & McHugh, P.A., to take part in major cases with a firm recognized as a pioneer in nursing home abuse litigation.

== Film career ==
A member of the Screen Actors Guild, Bailey had worked in film for three decades, including with such directors as Oliver Stone, Miloš Forman, Michael Hausman, and Jim Jarmusch. He described acting as “hard work, but it's something different for me.” In The People vs. Larry Flynt, Bailey played a judge, in a film that included a supporting role by political consultant and pundit James Carville.

Bailey appeared in Cigarette Girl (2009), set in 2035, a future in which cigarette smokers have been ostracized into ghettos called “smoking sections” and a pack of cigarettes cost more than $60. In Deadline (2012), he played a judge.

== Personal life/death ==
Bailey was married to the former Adrienne Marie Leslie; the couple had two sons, Justin and Merritt. Bailey died on July 12, 2015, of cancer at Methodist Hospital in his native Memphis, Tennessee.

== Partial filmography ==
- Mystery Train (1989) – Pool Player 3 (segment "Lost In Space")
- The People vs. Larry Flynt (1996) – Judge Thomas Alva Mantke
- How Stella Got Her Groove Back (1998) – Minister
- Woman's Story (2000) – Adam Freeman
- Forty Shades of Blue (2005) - Man (uncredited)
- Street Life (2007) (Video) – Agent Mike Stone
- Nothing But the Truth (2008) – Supreme Court Judge
- Cigarette Girl (2009) – Store Owner
- Deadline (2012) – Judge Williams (final film role)
