= Open Channel Victoria =

Open Channel is a not-for-profit film and television training organisation based in Melbourne, Victoria in Australia. It is the Victorian member of Screen Development Australia (SDA) which also includes Metro Screen (NSW), QPIX (Qld), Media Resource Centre (SA), Wide Angle Tasmania (Tas), and FTI (WA).

Open Channel assists with the film, television and multimedia industries by offering a variety of support to aspiring and emerging filmmakers. It providing facilities hire, training and production support. The organisation receives financial support from Film Victoria at a state level and Screen Australia at a Federal level and offers opportunities to Victorian filmmakers through initiatives such as the Raw Nerve Short Film Initiative.

Recent films developed by Open Channel include:

Year	Title	Producer
2011	"Switch"	Phoebe Hartley
2011	"Phone Call"	Daniel Deparis
2011	"Bruce Lee Played Badminton Too"	Corrie Chen
