= Set Yourself Free =

- Directed by: Henry Inglis & Aaron McCann
- Release date: January 29, 2014
- Running time: 0:01:45

Set Yourself Free is a hoax public service announcement directed by Henry Inglis and Aaron McCann, released on 29 January 2014, via the Internet. It has gone viral, and by 5 February 2014, had over 12 million views on YouTube. Its goal is to discourage truancy in schools. The ad was produced by Henry and Aaron, a filmmaking and comedy duo from Perth, Australia, with a history of making viral videos intended to shock, and the ad states that they did so on behalf of the "Learn for Life Foundation of Western Australia".

As of January 2021, the video is sitting at over 20 million views on YouTube.

== Campaign plot ==
In the video, four teenagers skip school, get into a Volkswagen van and drive to the beach, where they enjoy surfing, drinking beer, and generally relaxing and enjoying themselves. However, the ad takes an abrupt turn for the worse when one of the girls steps on a land mine and is immediately blown to bits, and two of the others are dispatched in a similar way. One surviving girl is then shown screaming before zooming out to show that the beach they had driven to that day was, in fact, an explosives testing site, before the screaming stops and a mushroom cloud appears, implying that she was also blown to smithereens. The film ends with the slogan, "This is what happens when you slack off. Stay in school."

== Reactions ==
A reporter for the International Business Times said that the ad "might be the most gruesome [PSA] yet," a remark that was echoed by Lee Moran writing for the New York Daily News and by The Daily Mirror's Rebecca Pocklington. Lance Richardson wrote that "As deterrents for skipping class go, severed body parts and a lingering mushroom cloud are pretty extreme." He went on to question whether the ad was authentic, and noted that the website of the organization on behalf of which it was supposedly produced (i.e. The Learn for Life Foundation of Western Australia) "features stock images of smiling people, and no contacts, explanations, or further details beyond the single video and a link to its directorial team, Henry and Aaron." He concluded that it was "probably a good bet to assume that Inglis and McCann invented the Foundation for the sake of the joke."
