= Burning Kiss =

- Directed by: Robbie Studsor
- Written by: Robbie Studsor
- Produced by: Megan Palinkas
- Starring: Liam Graham; Alyson Walker; Richard Mellick; Christie Sistrunk; Nichola Renton
- Release date: November 24, 2018 (Monster Fest)
- Running time: 81 minutes
- Country: Australia
- Language: English

Burning Kiss is a 2018 Australian neo-noir thriller film directed by Robbie Studsor, starring Liam Graham, Alyson Walker, and Richard Mellick.

== Plot ==
6 years after the car crash that crippled Edmund Bloom and killed his wife. Fueled by vengeance, a submissive daughter Charlotte cares for her father and helps to find the crash perpetrator. Unfortunately, as the truth becomes more and more distorted, Edmund begins to spiral further and further out of control.

== Cast ==
- Liam Graham as Max Woods
- Alyson Walker as Charlotte Bloom
- Richard Mellick as Edmond Bloom
- Christie Sistrunk as Sophia Valmont
- Nichola Renton as Juliette Bloom

== Production ==
Burning Kiss is Robbie Studsor's debut, he watched many film noir and old detective movies while writing the script. Studsor was inspired by the idea of building a mystery in reverse, this became the movie's main plot.

Before the shooting, Studsor watched featurettes and interviews with other directors, and took inspiration from cult directors such as Alfred Hitchcock and Billy Wilder. Principal photography took place in the director's home state Western Australia. Studsor ditched big city scenes because he wished to force the film's production team to be creative, utilizing the rural scenes of Western Australia to add to the film's kooky, eerie atmosphere.

The producer Megan Palinkas describes the film as “a smouldering psychodrama, etched with exotica and surrealism”. Also the actor Liam Graham comments “It’s a sexy, dangerous summer noir with hints of classic cinema”.
