= Metro Screen =

Former filmmaking school in Sydney

Coordinates: 33°53′06.50″S 151°13′32.84″E

Metro Screen was a not-for-profit film, television, and digital media training organisation based in Sydney.

== Description ==
Metro Screen was located in the Paddington Town Hall in Paddington.

It was the New South Wales member of Screen Development Australia (Note: Referred to in the 2015 Metro Screen report as "Screen Network".)Other members include Open Channel (Vic), QPIX (Qld), Media Resource Centre (SA), Wide Angle Tasmania (Tas), and FTI (WA). QPIX (Queensland) was also a member until it ceased operations in 2013.

== History ==
Metro Screen began in the 1970s as the Paddington Video Access Centre, before being incorporated as Metro Screen in 1981, with seed funding from the Australian Film Commission. During the eighties Metro was instrumental in developing community access to video and television production through training, productions, and capital investment in equipment and facilities. In the late eighties Metro organised the community television trials and was a key organisational player in the establishment of Sydney's community television station Television Sydney, which started broadcasting on 21 November 2005.

It received annual funding of $240,000 from Screen Australia in 2014-2015, to contribute to core operational costs. Metro Screen closed down in December 2015, after the funding from Screen Australia was not renewed, owing to a decision to no longer fund the development of emerging practitioners, that being the responsibility of the education sector.

== Films ==
Films developed by Metro Screen include:

| Year | Title | Producer |
|---|---|---|
| 2011 | "Burrowed Frowns" | Thomas Wright |
| 2011 | "Grand Design" | Samuel Bartlett |
| 2011 | "I Spy" | Samuel Faull |
| 2011 | "This Dog's Life" | Jo-Anne Brechin |
| 2010 | "Gone" | Josh Mawer |
| 2010 | "Abbie" | Erin Good |
| 2010 | "Sal" | Benjamin Brink |
| 2010 | "The Burnt Cork" | Alexandra Edmondson |
| 2009 | "Barton the Ghost Catcher" | Roy Weiland |
| 2009 | "Francis and Annie" | Genevieve Clay |
| 2009 | "Hinterland" | Sam McKeith |
| 2009 | "Rebel Wessex" | Sarah-Mace Dennis |
| 2008 | “Butterfingers” | Paul Searles |
| 2008 | “Homecoming” | Ngaire O'Leary |
| 2008 | “Body Dysmorphic” | Daren Nair |
| 2008 | “The Last Cherry” | Lisa Kowalski |
| 2007 | "Glory" | Donna Chang |
