= The Sculptor (film) =

2009 Australian thriller film

- Directed by: Christopher Kenworthy
- Release date: 2009
- Country: Australia
- Language: English

The Sculptor is a 2009 Australian thriller film. It was directed by Australian film director Christopher Kenworthy, who co-wrote and co-produced with Chantal Bourgault. Filming took place in Perth, Western Australia during early 2008. Prior to a limited online release in 2013, the film was retitled The Sculptor's Ritual. In 2019 it was added to the RevOnDemand catalogue of the Revelation Film Festival, where it can be rented or purchased for streaming.

== Plot ==
A struggling artist immerses himself in black magic in order to further his career. However, once he has everything he has ever desired, the demons return to plague him, his work, and his family.

== Cast ==
- Paul David-Goddard
- Melanie Vallejo
- Georgina Andrews
- Matt Penny
- Gordon Honeycombe

== Production ==
The production team included production designer Emma Fletcher and composer James Ledger, with additional music being provided by Trembling Blue Stars.

The Sculptor was one of the first Australian feature films to be filmed using the Red One camera. The film was described as a Supernatural Thriller. Cinematographer Jason Thomas said, "The hype is to be believed. The workflow, resolution, weight, camera features and the rest are unmatched. Forget the whole Film vs Digital debate; this capture system is something again and more." Despite this, the camera was not well understood and the film was shot with blown highlights and other cinematography errors.
