= Christopher Kenworthy =

Australian writer

Christopher Kenworthy (1968) is an Australian writer, artist, and former film director. He was the author of two novels, The Winter Inside and The Quality of Light for Serpent's Tail, along with a short story collection, Will You Hold Me? and the chapbook Sullom Hill. His fiction has been widely praised by authors such as Michael Moorcock, and anthologised in books such as The Year's Best Fantasy and Horror.

Born in Preston, England, he moved to Australia in 1997 and began a low-key directing career which lasted until 2013. He was the director of a feature film called The Sculptor. His Master Shots books were best-sellers for Michael Wiese Books. He won the Award For Directing (WA Screen Awards) in 2007 and directed many music videos, including Dreaming Light for Anathema (band).
