= Top Knot Detective =

2017 Japanese film

- Directed by: Aaron McCann Dominic Pearce
- Written by: Aaron McCann Dominic Pearce
- Produced by: Lauren Brunswick
- Starring: Toshi Okuzaki Masa Yamaguchi Mayu Iwasaki
- Cinematography: A.J. Coultier
- Edited by: Steve Huges
- Music by: Jima Kazara
- Distributed by: Umbrella Entertainment & Third Window Films
- Release date: 2017
- Running time: 87minutes
- Country: Australia
- Languages: Japanese, English

Top Knot Detective is a 2017 mockumentary film directed by Aaron McCann and Dominic Pearce. It humorously chronicles the rise and fall of a fictional Japanese samurai/detective series, known in Japan as Ronin Suiri Tentai and in the West as Top Knot Detective.

== Plot ==
The series follows Sheimasu Tantei, an Edo-era police officer turned ronin/private detective on a never-ending road to vengeance after being framed for the murder of his Master. The show features a variety of adversaries including ninjas, samurai, yakuza, aliens, monsters, demons, robots, time-traveling baseball players, and go-go dancers...

== Production ==
Originally shot as a short film for Australian broadcaster SBS in 2014, the film was later greenlit in late 2015 and shot in 2016 in the Australian cities of Perth and Sydney, and also the Japanese cities of Tokyo, Osaka, and Kyoto. To achieve the authentic look of an "archival documentary" the filmmakers dumped all of the 4K footage to VHS before recapturing the media and presenting it as if it was "uncovered" archival tapes.

== Cast and Crew ==
- Toshi Okuzaki as Takashi Takamoto
- Masa Yamaguchi as Haruto Kioke
- Mayu Iwasaki as Mia Matsumoto
- Guitar Wolf as Himself
- Written & Directed by Aaron McCann and Dominic Pearce
- Produced by Lauren Brunswick

== Release ==
The film premiered in 2017 and has been featured in various international film festivals, including Fantastic Fest, the International Film Festival Rotterdam, and the Sitges Film Festival.

== Reception ==
Top Knot Detective has been recognized for its unique blend of comedy and drama, earning a cult following. It has received a 100% rating on Rotten Tomatoes. The film has also won several awards and nominations.

Critics have praised the film for its inventive take on the mockumentary genre and its clever commentary on the Japanese entertainment industry.

Nathan Mattise of Ars Technica described the film as “wildly original,” highlighting its delightful derivation from the “show” it portrays. Andrew F. Peirce from The Curb lauded the film for being full of “timeless quotes” and “exciting action,” calling it “the comedy film that Australia deserves” and emphasizing its brilliant post-credits scene.

The film’s ability to play with the concept so earnestly that it momentarily convinces the audience of its reality has been noted as a testament to its convincing style.
