= Raven's Cabin =

2010 Australian film

- Directed by: Loren Johnson
- Written by: Katrina Rodriguez
- Produced by: Loren Johnson; Alice Johnson; Scott O'Keeffe
- Starring: Andrea Burdett; Luke Ledger; Pia Prendiville; Mauricio Merino Jr.
- Cinematography: Arthur Bienkowski
- Music by: Cameron Johnson; Kristen Johnson
- Production company: Atomic Light Pictures
- Release date: 1 April 2014
- Running time: 90 minutes
- Country: Australia
- Language: English
- Budget: A$1,000,000 (est.)

Raven's Cabin, also known under the working title Redback, is a 2014 independent Australian thriller film shot in the outback area of Perth, Western Australia. The film is directed by Loren Johnson and stars Luke Ledger, cousin of Heath Ledger.

== Plot ==
At a wilderness boot camp for difficult teens, the desperate spirit of an alleged suicide victim seeks out the help of a young girl to expose the truth about her death.

== Cast ==
- Andrea Burdett as Andrea Briggs
- Luke Ledger as Brian Carter
- Pia Prendiville as Jessica Howell
- Mauricio Merino Jr as Daniel Watts
- John McPherson as Harris
- Neal Huxley as Parker
- Jag Pannu as Jack Tyler
- David Ryan Kinsman as Cole Martin
- Elizabeth Frodsham as Claire Abbotts
- Scott O'Keeffe as Mechanic
- Laura Fairclough as Sarah White
- Leon Grey as Steven Wong
- Blake Prosser as Ryan Clarke
- Bradley Stevens as Billy

== Production ==
Raven's Cabin is directed by Loren Johnson and stars Luke Ledger, cousin of Heath Ledger. The working title was Redback. which was the name of the youth modification facility in the film. More than 90% of the cast and crew were inexperienced, this being their first feature film, and the film was made on a very low budget.

Filming began in the outback hills of Western Australia, around 45 minutes' drive outside Perth, in early May 2010.

== Release ==
Raven's Cabin had its world premiere in the Monster Fest in Perth on 1 April 2014.

It was released on DVD in the UK in August 2014.
