= Revelation Perth International Film Festival =

Revelation
- Location: Perth, Fremantle, Western Australia
- Founded: 1997
- Website: www.revelationfilmfest.org

Revelation Perth International Film Festival began in 1997. Founded by Richard Sowada to showcase a large range of independent feature films, documentaries, short films, and experimental works, it runs every July in Perth, Western Australia and is regarded as one of the best independent film festivals in Australia.

== History ==
Attendees at the 2025 Revelation Film Festival

Revelation's roots are as an underground film festival started in the basement of the Greenwich Club in Perth, Western Australia. The 1997 Festival ran 24 September – 4 October. In addition to the Greenwich Club, events and screenings were held at the Luna, Picabar, and Kulcha theatres. Opening night at the Greenwich featured Beat movies, live jazz, and DJ Joe 19. Screenings included "Timothy Leary's Dead": (Paul Davids), "Bad Bugs Bunny" (Dennis Nyback), and "Beat America" (Bruce Connor, Kenneth Anger, etc.).

The festival has developed into a large cultural event, screening films at cinemas and nightclubs across the city. Revelation specialises in independent and documentary films. Since its inception the festival has grown in size and scope. Alongside film screenings, the festival also features special events, including collaborations with musicians providing live soundtrack scores, academic conferences on cinema and culture, and associated visual art exhibitions.

It is a tightly curated event that also includes international animations, short films, experimental works and hybrid styles. It annually receives around 400 entries from the international community and is programmed from a mix of these submitted and invited works.

From 2001 - 2008, the festival collaborated with SPLIF - Screening Perth's Local Independent Films - showcasing local independent films and short films as part of the festival.

In 2006, founder and festival director Richard Sowada began working at the Australian Centre for the Moving Image. Filmmaker, broadcaster and journalist Megan Spencer became program director for the 2007 festival.

Since 2008 Jack Sargeant, film theorist, author and curator, has programmed the event, maintaining its unique status amongst Australian film festivals. The festival has expanded each year, attracting wider acclaim and an increased international profile.

Since its inception, Revelation has featured Australian premieres and films such as Sonic Outlaws directed by Craig Baldwin, Sick: The Life & Death of Bob Flanagan, Heavy Metal Parking Lot by Jeff Krulik, WADD: The Life & Times of John C Holms, Divine Trash, Spellbound, One Hundred Mornings, Wheedle's Groove, Nude Study, Pictures of Superheroes and cult movies such as Beat Girl, Pull My Daisy, Gimme Shelter, and Cigarette Girl.

The event has participated as a platform for a range of feature and documentary works that have gone on to attain theatrical, DVD or other on-going release and sales in Australia. It also works with a range of major Australian screen culture events, organisations and festivals with guests, curated programs and individual titles.

== Opening night films ==
Revelation 2007 poster

Opening Night Films have included:

- 2002: The Low Down (directed by Jamie Thraves)
- 2003: Gimme Shelter (directed by Albert and David Maysles and Charlotte Zwerin)
- 2004: Reconstruction (directed by Christoffer Boe)
- 2005: Kontroll (directed by Nimród Antal)
- 2006: Ambulance (directed by Laurits Munch-Petersen)
- 2007: Monkey Warfare (directed by Reginald Harkema)
- 2008: Island of Lost Souls (directed by Nikolaj Arcel)
- 2009: Sita Sings the Blues (directed by Nina Paley)
- 2010: Good Hair (directed by Jeff Stilson)
- 2011: Fire in Babylon (directed by Stevan Riley)
- 2012: Your Sister's Sister (directed by Lynn Shelton)
- 2013: Burn (directed by Tom Putnam and Brenna Sanchez)
- 2014: Under the Skin (directed by Jonathan Glazer)
- 2015: Last Cab to Darwin (directed by Jeremy Sims)
- 2016: Demolition (directed by Jean-Marc Vallée)
- 2017: Becoming Bond (directed by Josh Greenbaum)
- 2018: The Breaker Upperers (directed by Madeleine Sami and Jackie van Beek)
- 2019: Kursk (directed by Thomas Vinterberg)
- 2020: Firestarter (directed by Wayne Blair and Nel Minchin)
- 2021: Freshman Year (directed by Cooper Raiff)
- 2022: Sissy (directed by Hannah Barlow and Kane Senes)
- 2023: Devil's Peak (directed by Ben Young)
- 2024: Kid Snow (directed by Paul Goldman)
- 2025: U Are the Universe (directed by Pavlo Ostrikov)

== See also ==
- Film industry in Western Australia
- Screen Australia
- Cinema of Australia
