= FTI (Western Australia) =

Former organisation supporting the film and other media industry in Western Australia

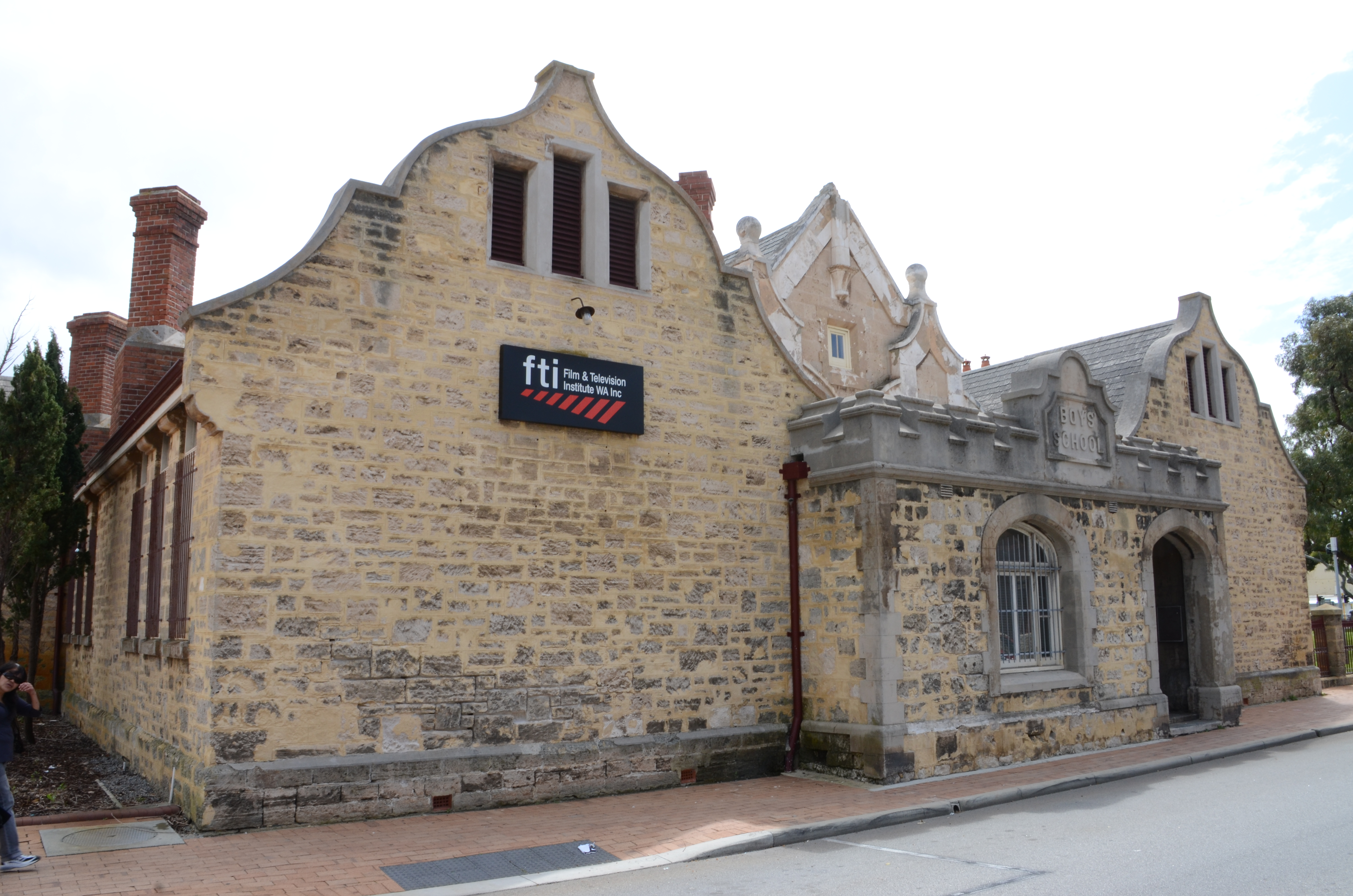
- FTI former home in Fremantle, WA
- Successor: Screenwest
- Formation: 1971 (55 years ago)
- Dissolved: 2017
- Coordinates: 32.050837°S 115.749266°E
- Formerly called: Film and Television Institute

FTI WA Inc., formerly the Film and Television Institute and also known as the Perth Institute of Film and Television, was a screen resource centre located in Western Australia aimed at increasing the vibrancy of the screen sector, including film, Television, games and interactive media. Founded in 1971, the Institute occupied the heritage-listed old Fremantle School building in Adelaide Street, Fremantle, completed in 1854, before relocating to Northbridge, an inner city suburb in Perth, in May 2014.

It wound up operations on 20 June 2017, when it merged with Screenwest.

== History ==
Until May 2014 when it moved to the State Library of Western Australia at 48 Lake Street, Northbridge, FTI occupied the heritage-listed old Fremantle Boys' School, opened in 1854–5.

On 17 May 2017, amid uncertainty around future funding, FTI announced that it would be closing down and merging with ScreenWest. Support for early career filmmakers in the form of a grants program transitioned from the FTI to Screenwest from July 2017, when the FTI ceased operations.

== Description ==
The FTI was the WA member of Screen Development Australia (SDA), along with other members Metro Screen (NSW), Open Channel (Vic), QPIX (Qld), Media Resource Centre (SA), and Wide Angle Tasmania (Tas). It was a non-profit, membership-based organisation providing members with low-cost equipment and facilities hire, production assistance and script consultation, as well as regular production grants for low budget filmmakers.

In 2014, FTI officially moved into the games and interactive space, hiring Kate Raynes-Goldie as its first Director of Interactive Programs, the first of its kind for a non-governmental Australian screen resource association.

== Funding grants ==
FTI administered many of the major funding grants available for short film and documentary production in Western Australia. The grants program is now managed by Screenwest.

=== Philanthropy Program ===
By March 2017, FTI's Philanthropy Program had raised over $300,000 for West Australian screen projects since its inception on 2015.

The Philanthropy Program allows organisations and people to donate funds to programs or specific screen projects, taking advantage of FTI's not-for-profit status. It differs significantly from traditional grant funding models in that it permits year-round private sector donations to projects with little administrative interference.

=== Raw Nerve ===
While being administered by FTI, the Raw Nerve scheme is an initiative of Screen Development Australia (SDA) in conjunction with Screen Australia. It provides $5,000 worth of in-kind assistance (equipment and facilities rental) plus a $2,000 cash budget. This grant is available to all WA filmmakers, regardless of FTI membership. Recent films include:

Year	Title	Producer
2010	"Beware Drop Bears"	Casper Zielono and Cameron Thompson
2010	"Innocent Andy"	Neale Crawford
2010	"Play Lunch"	Cassandra Nguyen and Tamara Small
2009	"I will NOT be Outbid"	Tasha Stephenson and Mel Judkins
2009	"Trash Out"	Phillip Walker and Oriellie Tylor
2009	"The Washing line"	Penny Bedford and Megan Riley
2009	"Cashed Up Bogans"	Jules Duncan
2009	"Crows Feet"	Megan Palinkas
2008	"Strings"	Mark Alderson and Crystal McCallum
2008	"Shatter"	Gary Sewell and Vanessa Demaine
2008	"Contact"	Rowan Crosby and Christina Yiannakis
2008	"The Nappy Tree"	Christine Sistrunk
2008	"Victims"	Julia Ngeow and Gregg Johnson

=== OOMPF ===
OOMPF stands for "One Off Members Production Fund". Similarly to Raw Nerve, it provides a $5,000 in-kind budget, but also $5,000 cash, up from Raw Nerve's $2,000. As the name suggests, you must be a paid-up member of FTI to apply for the grant, and you can only receive it once. As of 2015, OOMPF also became available to game developers, thus providing WA's only game production funding.

=== Link ===
Link provides up to $30,000 cash, provided by ScreenWest, for WA filmmakers to create either a documentary, drama or animation project. The concept behind the grant is that it provides the 'link' for early career filmmakers to move up to professional standards.

=== Hyperlink ===
Hyperlink is the next step up from Link, providing up to $70,000 for the creation of a film of 15 minutes or less duration. Filmmakers are only eligible to apply for Hyperlink if they have already completed a Link funded or equivalently funded film
