= Luna Leederville =

Cinema in Perth, Western Australia

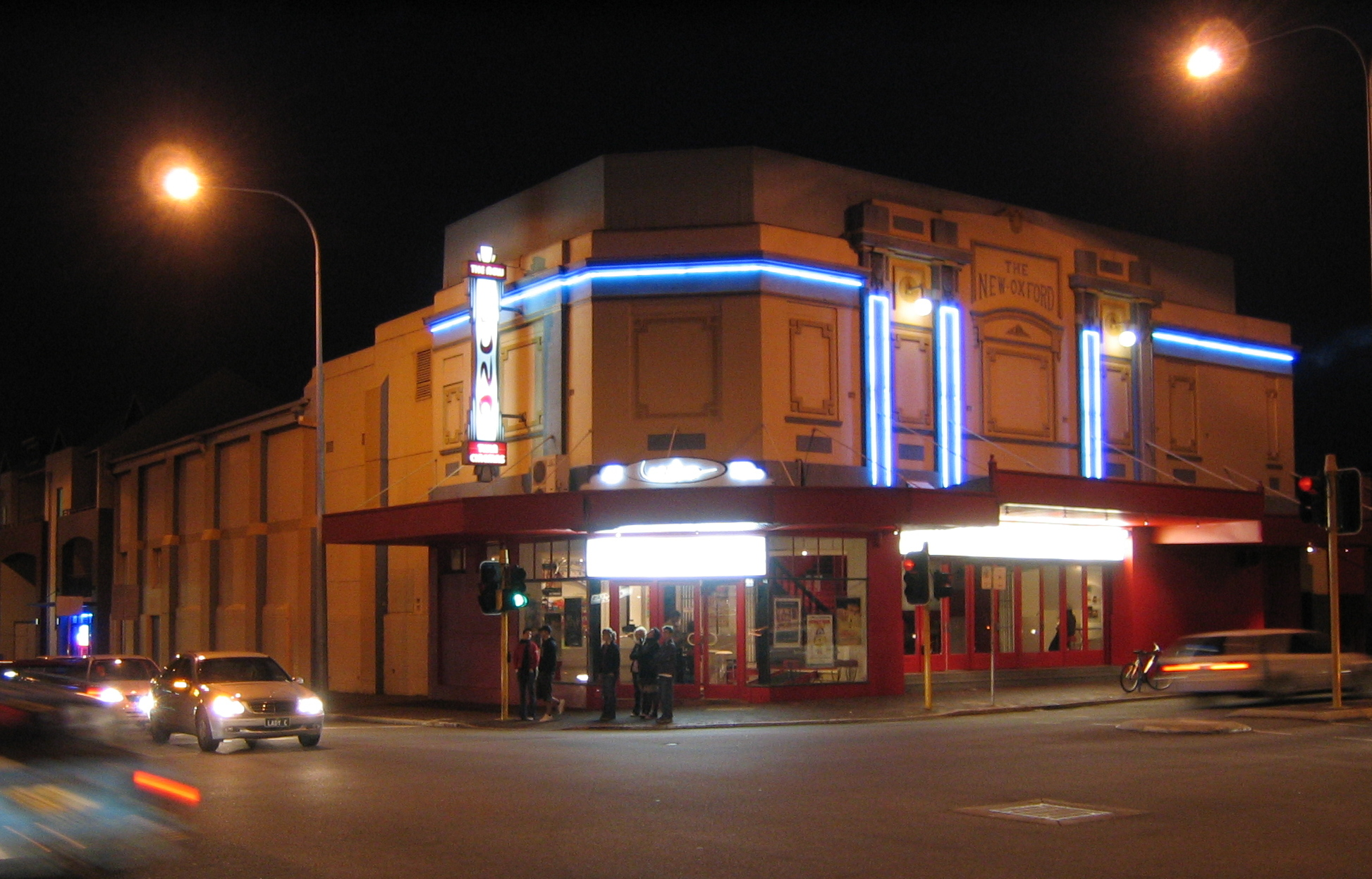
- Luna Leederville at night (2004)
- Alternative names: New Oxford Theatre; Nickelodeon; Olympia Theatre; Star Theatre; Luna Cinema

General information
- Type: Cinema
- Architectural style: Inter-War Art Deco
- Location: 155–159 Oxford Street (corner Vincent Street), Leederville, Western Australia, Australia
- Coordinates: 31.936231°S 115.840985°E
- Completed: 1927

Design and construction
- Architect: S. B. Rosenthal
- Main contractor: E. A. Allwood

Website
- lunapalace.com.au

Western Australia Heritage Register
- Official name: New Oxford Cinema
- Type: Municipal Inventory
- Designated: 13 Nov 1995
- Reference no.: 2206
- Municipality: City of Vincent

Luna Leederville (formerly New Oxford Theatre, Nickelodeon, Olympia, Star Theatre and Luna Cinema) is a cinema complex located at the corner of Oxford and Vincent streets in Leederville, a suburb of Perth, Western Australia.

== History ==
The New Oxford Theatre was designed by architect Samuel B. Rosenthal and constructed by E. A. Allwood. Rosenthal was a significant architect in Western Australia in the interwar period, known primarily for his cinema designs. The New Oxford Theatre was opened in March 1927 by the Minister for Works, Alex C. McCallum, before a capacity audience of 1,286. The opening programme included vaudeville, music by the New Oxford Orchestra, a short play, some comedy, and a special appearance by Beryl Mills, the first Miss Australia. Its first managers were William Bellion and Mr Cunningham. Silent movies were originally shown to the accompaniment of a piano or organ. During a second anniversary screening in 1929, hundreds were turned away because there were no seats left. This was the first suburban theatre to install sound, which was installed in September 1929.

A 3,000-seat picture garden was opened on the southern corner of the same intersection in 1935, the largest of its kind at the time, and was named New Oxford Beautiful. As time went on, the garden's capacity shrunk to just under 2,000. The theatre was then owned by Ampol and Ralph Stewart was the operator until August 1959. Evelyn and Bob Manorgan owned the theatre from 1959 to October 1966. The picture gardens closed in 1964, and an Ampol service station was built on the site by the owners. After Ampol sold it, the theatre was closed for two months in 1966 and then re-opened as the Nickelodeon. Then in 1972 it was renamed the Olympia and for the next seven years showed mainly Greek and Italian films, reflecting the changing local community.

Cyril Watson was the next to take over the lease of the theatre in Oxford Street and together with partner Roger Hunt and his wife Christine, they upgraded the theatre. It then re-opened as the New Oxford on 18 August 1979 showing family-type films. The response was not as good as expected and Watson tried R-rated films to boost attendances. This had the desired effect and new fittings and carpets were purchased. A coffee bar was also opened upstairs. In 1981 a new roof was installed and a large 13-metre (43 ft) screen, new projection equipment and new seating were purchased. The coffee bar and upstairs lounge were turned into a small cinema, which seated around 150 people and it was named Star Theatre. In 1980, the cinema underwent a renovation and two years later, the lounge was converted into a second cinema. Watson began providing live music on Sunday afternoons and it was around that time that he was offered The Gods Must Be Crazy which was not doing well in the eastern states but proved to be so successful, becoming the cinema's longest running film, showing at the theatre for three years. In the mid-1980s, the theatre, now fully refurbished, began to show other independent films and in both 1998 and 1999 it was named the best Indie-Urban Cinema in Australia by the Australian Independent Distributors Association. The cinema was renamed the Luna Cinema in the 1990s. In 1995 the theatre was converted into twin cinemas, and in 1996 a new picture garden opened at the rear of the adjoining shops at 163–167 Oxford Street, which seated 200. The entrance was later relocated and became part of the main building. Luna Palace group took over in 1999 and another renovation was performed, with the cinema renamed Luna Leederville.

In 2009 a documentary, The New Oxford Project, was produced by the Film and Television Institute of Western Australia (in conjunction with the Town of Vincent) delving into the history of the New Oxford Theatre, since its opening in 1927 through to present day and the impact it has had on culture and residents of Leederville.

== Architectural character ==
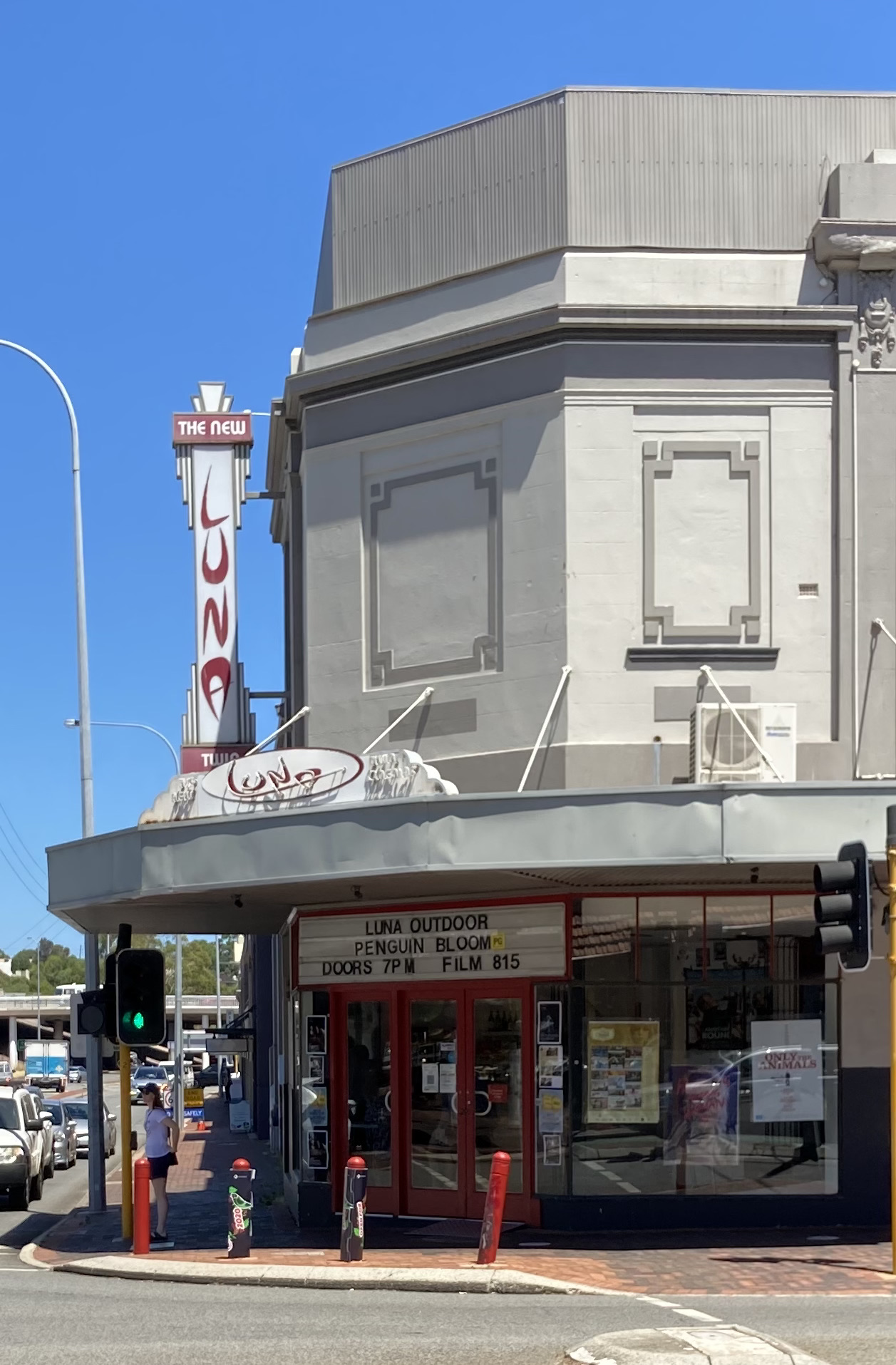
Entrance at intersection of Oxford and Vincent streets in Leederville

The Luna Leederville is a representative example of a suburban cinema in the Interwar Art Deco style. The two storey façade is embellished with stucco decoration. Its façade is styled in Art Deco rather than the moderne used in theatres of a similar period such as the Astor, Como Theatre and Regal. The theatre dominates the intersection and anchors this corner. The original roofline has been raised and the original verandah has been replaced. The side and rear facades are functionalist in their character and the side façade contributes little to the streetscape.

== Heritage value ==
The Luna Leederville was included on the Town of Vincent's Municipal Heritage Inventory in November 1995 and is listed in the Town's Town Planning Scheme The building is not currently listed on the State Register of Heritage Places, but is recommended to be included on the register and is currently awaiting determination by the Heritage Council of Western Australia.
