= List of Australian films of 2004 =

This is a list of Australian films released in 2004.

== 2004 ==
Title	Director	Cast	Genre	Notes
Aussie Park Boyz	Nunzio La Bianca		Action	
Betelnut Bisnis	Chris Owen		Documentary	
Beyond Sorry	David Vadiveloo		Documentary	
Big Men, Bigger Dreams: Australian Wrestlers	Dimitri Ellerington		Documentary	Nominated 2004 AFI Best Sound in a Non-Feature Film
Bondi Tsunami				
Bruce and Me				
Caught II				
Citizen Black				
Clash!				
The Crop				
Dances of Ecstasy				
A Decent Factory				
Defenceless				
Dreams for Life				
The Garth Method				
Get Rich Quick				
Glass Love				
Hainan ji fan				
Human Touch				
The Illustrated Family Doctor				
The Ister				
Josh Jarman	Pip Mushin	Marcus Graham, Daniella Farinacci, Damien Richardson, Kestie Morassi, Kym Gyngell, Suzy Cato, Alex Menglet, Wayne Hope, Roz Hammond, Marcella Russo, Louise Siversen, Ross Williams, Danny Gesundheit, John Cousins, Chelsea Gibb, Damian Walshe-Howling, Nicole Nabout, Penelope Bartlau, Talia Krape, Elisa Gray, Melinda McCallum, Hamsa Rafeh, Leanne Cherney, Shiloh Nelson, Libby Stone, Dave Vanderzee, Peter Savieri, Nicholas Dutt, Cliff Ellen, Deidre Rubenstein, Daniel Mrocki, Genevieve Moore, Nicholas Buc, Aaron Barnden, Teague Rook, Carolyn Bock, Peter Olsen, Claude Oakes, Andrew Gillard, Pip Mushin, Jamie Mushin, Torguil Neilson, Ben Morieson, Joshua Parnell, Sean McGrath, Rodney Afif, Alyssa Conrau, Stephanie Thom, Erkki Veltheim, Alex Brogan, Stuart Johnson, Nicholas Synot, Natalya Bobenko, Ashley Evans, Simone Kay, Deon Nuku, Simon Vowles, Ashley Wallen, Megan West, Kate Wormald, Hanna Griffiths		
Jupiter Love				
Language of Love				
Letters to Ali				
Le Violoncelle	Adam Sèbire		Short (4min)	Nominated 2004 Montréal World Film Festival for First Prize (Short Films)
Liberty in Restraint	Michael Ney	Noel Graydon, Puck, Mistress Felina	Documentary Feature DVD (90 min), TV version (52 min), Early Short Version (35 min)	Winner (Best Short Doc) CineKink New York 2004
Little Lies				
Little Man				
Love's Brother	Jan Sardi	Giovanni Ribisi, Adam Garcia, Joe Petruzzi, Rodney Afif, Bruno Lucia, Mario Di Ienno, Mark Sellito, Dina Panozzo, John Bluthal, Silvia De Santis, Barry Otto, Reg Mombassa, Osvaldo Maione, Eleanor Bron, Anna Burgess, Giacomo Laurenti, Amelia Warner, Fiametta Mammanco, Paride Blasi, Caterina Laurenti, Cecilia Pericone, Paola Dionisotti, Craig J. Corsetti, Claudio Vittore, Giovanni Proietti, Carmelina Di Guglielmo		
Lovesong				
A Man's Gotta Do	Chris Kennedy	John Howard, Alyssa McClelland, Rebecca Frith, Gyton Grantley, Rohan Nicol, Helen Thomson, Rowan Jackson, Amie McKenna, Vasa Gavrilovska, Lynne McGimpsy, Joanne Cahill, Tony Barry, Grant Bennett, Manuel Terron, Nicholas Brown, Robyn Ormiston		
Marco Solo				
The Marshall Cooking Show				
Me Myself & I				
Meaning				
Medusa				
The Men Who Would Conquer China				
Mister Kruger				
Mona Lisa				
The Money				
Mothers Little Murderer				
Moustache				
Mr. Patterns				
Muscledude 11 x 6				
My Sister				
Nailed				
Neighborhood Botch				
Neoplasia				
The New Boots				
Night				
No More				
Object of My Affection				
Oblivion				
The Offering				
On a Shoestring				
Once I Was				
One Day				
One Perfect Day	Paul Currie	Dan Spielman, Leeanna Walsman, Nathan Phillips, Dawn Klingberg, Leigh Whannell, Frank Gallacher, Malcolm Robertson, Josephine Eberhard, Roy Davies, Amy McKay, Toni Joel, Abbie Cornish, Nathan Wentworth, Alex Menglet, Kerry Armstrong, Mark Currie, Syd Brisbane, Carly Schmidt, Emily Milburn, Andrew Howard, Robbie Vagana, Rory Williamson, Adam May, Anthony Littlechild, Maria Nella, Felix, Judith Templeman, Jane Oliver, Dorothy Yeung, Keith Slade, Clinton Cormany		
Oranges				
Out on the Tiles				
Oyster Farmer	Anna Reeves	Kerry Armstrong		
Passion with a Pedigree				
Peaches				
PictoCrime				
Pink Sheep				
Pity 24				
Poker Kings				
Post				
The President Versus David Hicks				
Queen Sequina: The Life of Ron Muncaster				
Rapid Fear				
Recycle				
Right Here Right Now				
The Road Not Taken				
Sam and the Green Men				
The Scree				
The Setting Supermarket Sun				
Shank				
A Short Portrait of Obsession				
Small Ant Syndrome				
Soar				
Sold Out				
Somersault	Cate Shortland	Abbie Cornish, Sam Worthington		Screened at the 2004 Cannes Film Festival, AACTA Award for Best Film
Somewhere Near Kokoda				
Standing Room Only				
Star				
Straight to You				
Strange Bedfellows	Dean Murphy	Michael Caton, Alan Cassell, Andy Pappas, Paula Duncan, Roy Billing, Jamie Robertson, Kevin Dee, Paul Hogan, Stewart Faichney, Simon Paton, Shane Withington, Monica Maughan, Jenny Dale, Kestie Morassi, Ashley Evans, Adam Pedicini, Glynn Nicholas, Linda Adams, Adele Dixon, Peter O'Halloran, Joe Bono, Danielle Sims, Tony Arapoglou, Rob Carlton, Tracy Bartram, Amanda Monroe, Gary Down, Christopher Kirby, Jon Stephens, Myles Collins, Justin Rudzki, Mark Murphy, Tayler Kane, Tim Hughes, Michael Carman, Scott Andrews, Kentaro Hara, James Lee, Rod Waterworth, Ethan Thoi, Neville Burns, Craig Fook, Clay Dunn, Gary Prichard, Pete Postlethwaite, Lucy Rechnitzer, Bill Plant, Jim Wilshire, Robin Bisset, Sally Plant, Sarah Hendriks, Naomi Davis, Michael Ienna		
The Strange Game of Hyde and Seek				
Strange James				
Suburban Boys				
Sum of Existence				
Summer Angst				
Sweet Dreams				
The Tasty Bust Reunion				
Tat wam asi				
Tears Before Bedtime				
Tempting Fate				
Tender Words				
Think/Positive				
Thorns				
Thunderstruck	Darren Ashton	Damon Gameau, Stephen Curry, Ryan Johnson, Callan Mulvey, Sam Worthington	Road movie/ comedy	
Time Flies				
The Time Phone				
Timed Call				
Tim's New Hope				
Tom White	Alkinos Tsilimidos	Colin Friels, Rachael Blake, Dan Spielman, Loene Carmen, David Field, Bill Hunter, Jarryd Jinks, Angela Punch McGregor, Kevin Harrington, Gloria Ajenstat, Arthur Angel, Jonathan Auf Der Heide, Nick Barkla, Jack Charles, Roger Churches, Mark Constable, Peter Curtin, Cliff Ellen, Oscar Fairweather, Julie Forsyth, Laura Gordon, Vanessa Isgro, Jonathan Kemp, Stephen Lopez, Andy McPhee, Hamish Michael, Phil Motherwell, Isabella Oldham, Chris Pace, Adam Sarros, Jim Shaw, Christopher Toohey, Ashley Zukerman		
Tomboy				
Too Little Justice				
The Tooth				
Transgression				
Two Door Mansion				
The Turning Circle				
The Twelve Months				
Under the Radar	Ivan Clarry	Chloe Maxwell	Comedy/Thriller	Nominated 2004 AFI Award for Best Actress in a Leading Role (Chloe Maxwell) and won 2004 ASSG Award
Watch Comes Around	Aaron McCann		Short/Comedy	
We Have Decided Not to Die	Daniel Askill		Short/Drama	
What Grown-Ups Know	Jonathan Wald		Short/ Drama	
Where Is She?: The Secret Footage of Dr. F. Height			Short	
White Room	Andrew Gallacher, Simon J. Green		Short/Comedy/Drama	
A Whole New You	Jody Dwyer		Short/Comedy	
The Widower	Kevin Lucas		Drama/Musical	
Wisdom of the Ancients, Episode 8: Hanging Out.	Patrick McGeown	Emelia Rixon, Rod Burnett	Mockumentary	
A Wonderful Day				
Yin	Costa Avgoustinos		Short/Animation	
Zork & Zamien's Big Day Out	Devon John Landau		Short	

== See also ==
- 2004 in Australia
- 2004 in Australian television
- List of 2004 box office number-one films in Australia
