= 10th AACTA Awards =

Australian film and television awards ceremony

- Date: 30 November 2020
- Location: The Star, Sydney, New South Wales, Australia
- Hosted by: Tom Gleeson; Susie Youssef; Rove McManus

Highlights
- Most awards: Film: Babyteeth; TV: Stateless
- Most nominations: Stateless
- Best Film: Babyteeth
- Best Drama Series: Mystery Road
- Best Comedy Series: Upright

Television/radio coverage
- Networks
- Foxtel Arts; Seven Network

The 10th Australian Academy of Cinema and Television Arts Awards (generally known as the AACTA Awards) is an awards ceremony to celebrate the best of Australian films and television of 2020. The main ceremony was held at The Star in Sydney and televised on Foxtel Arts and the Seven Network.

== Feature film ==
| Best Film: Babyteeth — Alex White; H Is for Happiness — Julie Ryan, Tenille Kennedy, Lisa Hoppe; I Am Woman — Rosemary Blight, Unjoo Moon; The Invisible Man — Kylie du Fresne, Jason Blum; True History of the Kelly Gang — Hal Vogel, Liz Watts, Justin Kurzel, Paul Ranford; Relic — Anna McLeish, Sarah Shaw | Best Indie Film: Standing Up for Sunny — Steve Vidler (Dir), Jamie Hilton, Michael Pontin, Drew Bailey; A Boy Called Sailboat — Cameron Nugent, Andrew Curry, Nick Farnell, Sullivan Stapleton; Hot Mess — Lucy Coleman, Sheila Jayadev, Lyn Norfor, Martin Thorne; Koko: A Red Dog Story — Dominic Pearce, Aaron McCann, Nelson Woss, Lauren Brunswick; A Lion Returns — Serhat Caradee, Liz Burton; Unsound — Ian Watson, Tsu Shan Chambers |
| Best Direction: Shannon Murphy — Babyteeth; John Sheedy — H Is For Happiness; Leigh Whannell — The Invisible Man; Natalie Erika James — Relic; Justin Kurzel — True History of the Kelly Gang | Best Screenplay, Original or Adapted: Rita Kalnejais — Babyteeth; Abe Forsythe — Little Monsters; Leigh Whannell — The Invisible Man; Natalie Erika James, Christian White — Relic; Shaun Grant — True History of the Kelly Gang |
| Best Lead Actor: Toby Wallace — Babyteeth; George MacKay — True History of the Kelly Gang; Sam Neill — Rams; Richard Roxburgh — H is for Happiness; Hugo Weaving — Measure for Measure | Best Lead Actress: Eliza Scanlen — Babyteeth; Tilda Cobham-Hervey — I Am Woman; Laura Gordon — Undertow; Elisabeth Moss — The Invisible Man; Lupita Nyong'o — Little Monsters |
| Best Supporting Actor: Ben Mendelsohn — Babyteeth; Fayssal Bazzi — Measure for Measure; Russell Crowe — True History of the Kelly Gang; Aaron Jeffery — The Flood; Wesley Patten — H is for Happiness | Best Supporting Actress: Essie Davis — Babyteeth; Emma Booth — H is for Happiness; Bella Heathcote — Relic; Deborah Mailman — H is for Happiness; Doris Younane — Measure for Measure |
| Best Cinematography: Stefan Duscio — The Invisible Man; Andrew Commis — Babyteeth; Brad Shield — Bloody Hell; Geoffrey Hall — Escape from Pretoria; Bonnie Elliott — H is for Happiness | Best Editing: Andy Canny — The Invisible Man; Steve Evans — Babyteeth; Dany Cooper — I Am Woman; Nick Fenton — True History of the Kelly Gang; Julie-Anne De Ruvo, Nick Meyers — Undertow |
| Best Original Music Score: Amanda Brown — Babyteeth; Craig Armstrong — Dirt Music; Nerida Tyson-Chew — H is for Happiness; Rafael May — I Am Woman; Jed Kurzel — True History of the Kelly Gang | Best Sound: P.K Hooker, Will Files, Paul “Salty” Brincat — The Invisible Man; Sam Hayward, Angus Robertson, Rick Lisle, Nick Emond — Babyteeth; Robert Mackenzie, Ben Osmo, Pete Smith, Tara Webb — I Am Woman; Robert Mackenzie, John Wilkinson, Steve Burgess, Glenn Newnham — Relic; Frank Lipson, Steve Single, Andrew Neil, Andrew Ramage — True History of the Kelly Gang |
| Best Production Design: Karen Murphy, Rebecca Cohen — True History of the Kelly Gang; Sherree Philips — Babyteeth; Michael Turner, Richie Dehne — I Am Woman; Alex Holmes, Katie Sharrock — The Invisible Man; Robert Perkins — Miss Fisher and the Crypt of Tears | Best Costume Design: Alice Babidge — True History of the Kelly Gang; Terri Lamera — H is for Happiness; Emily Seresin — I Am Woman; Zohie Castellano, Olivia Simpson — Measure for Measure; Nina Edwards — Standing up for Sunny |
| Best Visual Effects or Animation: Tim Crosbie, Joy Wu, Jason Troughton, Tom Wood, Julian Hutchens — The Eight Hundred; Olivier Dumont, Kathy Siegel, Malte Sarnes, Mark Byers, Matt Grieg — Ford V Ferrari; Jonathan Dearing, Marcus Bolton, Matt Ebb, Aevar Bjarnason — The Invisible Man; Jimmy Uddo, Nicholas Brooks, Josh Simmonds, Ineke Majoor — It Chapter Two; Thomas Elder-Groebe, Mark Breakspear, Glenn Melenhorst, Ineke Majoor — Jumanji: The Next Level | Best Hair and Makeup: Kirsten Veysey — True History of the Kelly Gang; Nikki Gooley, Wendy de Waal, Cassie O’Brien — I Am Woman; Sheldon Wade, Kerryn Flewell-Smith, Cheryl Williams — Operation Buffalo; Chiara Tripodi, Larry Van Duynhoven, Toni Ffrench — Preacher: Episode 8: Fear of the Lord; Angela Conte, Larry Van Duynhoven, Bec Taylor — Relic |
Best Casting: Kirsty McGregor, Stevie Ray — Babyteeth; Jane Norris — H is for Happiness; Nikki Barrett — I Am Woman; Allison Meadows — Stateless; Nikki Barrett — True History of the Kelly Gang

== Television ==
| Best Drama Series: Mystery Road — David Jowsey, Greer Simpkin (ABC); Bloom — David Maher, David Taylor, Glen Dolman, Sue Seeary (Stan); Doctor Doctor — Ian Collie, Ally Henville, Keith Thompson, Rodger Corser (Nine Network); Halifax: Retribution — Roger Simpson, Louisa Kors (Nine Network); The Heights — Warren Clarke, Peta Astbury-Bulsara, Debbie Lee, Que Minh Luu (ABC); Wentworth — Jo Porter, Pino Amenta (Foxtel) | Best Telefeature or Mini Series: Stateless — Cate Blanchett, Elise McCredie, Tony Ayres, Sheila Jayadev, Paul Ranford, Liz Watts, Andrew Upton (ABC); The Gloaming — Victoria Madden, John Molloy, Fiona McConaghy (Stan); Hungry Ghosts — Stephen Corvini, Timothy Hobart, Debbie Lee, Sue Masters (SBS); Operation Buffalo — Vincent Sheehan, Tanya Phegan, Peter Duncan (ABC); The Secrets She Keeps — Helen Bowden, Jason Stephens, Paul Watters (Network Ten) |
| Best Comedy Series: Upright — Jason Stephens, Helen Bowden, Melissa Kelly, Chris Taylor, Tim Minchin (Foxtel); At Home Alone Together — Nick Hayden, Janet Gaeta, Nikita Agzarian, Dan Ilic (ABC); Black Comedy — Kath Shelper, Mark O'Toole, Nakkiah Lui, David Woodhead (ABC); The Other Guy — Angie Fielder, Polly Staniford, Jude Troy, Alice Willison (Stan); Rosehaven — Andrew Walker, Kevin Whyte, Celia Pacquola, Luke McGregor (ABC) | Best Entertainment Program: Have You Been Paying Attention? — Santo Cilauro, Tom Gleisner, Michael Hirsh, Rob Sitch (Network Ten); Eurovision – Australia Decides – Gold Coast 2020 — Paul Clarke, Stephanie Werrett, Josh Martin (SBS); Hard Quiz — Chris Walker, Kevin Whyte, Charlie Pickering, Tom Gleeson, John Tabbagh (ABC); LEGO Masters Australia — David McDonald, AJ Johnson, Mark Barlin (Nine Network); The Voice — Leigh Aramberri, Chloe Baker, Jaala Webster, Beth Hart (Nine Network); The Weekly — Kevin Whyte, Chris Walker, Charlie Pickering, Jo Long (ABC) |
| Best Comedy Entertainment Program: Shaun Micallef's Mad As Hell — Shaun Micallef, Peter Beck, Gary McCaffrie (ABC); Australian Amazon Original Stand-up Specials — Todd Abbott, Frank Bruzzese, Kevin Whyte, Kathleen McCarthy (Amazon Prime Video Australia); Australian Lockdown Comedy Festival — Kevin Whyte, Jon Casimir, Todd Abbott (Stan); Drunk History Australia — Paul Franklin, Chris Culvenor, Sophia Mogford, Ashley Davies (Network Ten); LOL: Last One Laughing Australia — David McDonald, Marty Benson (Amazon Prime Video Australia) | Best Factual Entertainment Program: Gogglebox Australia — Howard Myers, David McDonald, Kerrie Kerr (Foxtel / Network Ten); Hamish & Andy’s “Perfect” Holiday — Tim Bartley, Hamish Blake, Andy Lee, Ryan Shelton (Nine Network); Love on the Spectrum — Cian O’Clery, Karina Holden, Jenni Wilks (ABC); The Project — Craig Campbell, Christopher Bendall, Sarah Ashley (Network Ten); Who Do You Think You Are? — Maxine Gray, Michael Wilton (SBS); You Can't Ask That — Kirk Docker, Frances O’Riordan, Ali Russell (ABC) |
| Best Lifestyle Program: The Living Room — Sarah Thornton, Ciaran Flannery (Network Ten); Better Homes and Gardens — Russel Palmer, Rani Eaton (Seven Network); Jimmy Shu's Taste of the Territory — Naina Sen, Sally Ingleton, Josh Martin (SBS); Luke Nguyen's Railway Vietnam — Michael Donnelly, Josh Martin, John Hatcher, Clara O’Sullivan (SBS); Restoration Australia — Brooke Bayvel (ABC) | Best Reality Series: Masterchef Australia — Marty Benson, Adam Fergusson (Network Ten); The Amazing Race Australia — Paul Franklin, Chris Culvenor, Sophia Mogford, Stephen Tate (Network Ten); Australian Survivor: All Stars — Amelia Fisk, Keely Sonntag, Adam Fergusson (Network Ten); The Block — David Barbour, Julian Cress (Nine Network); I'm A Celebrity... Get Me Out Of Here! — Ben Ulm, Clare Bath, Alex Mavroidakis, Riima Daher (Network Ten); The Real Dirty Dancing — Paul Franklin, Chris Culvenor, Sophia Mogford, Sonya Wilkes (Seven Network) |
| Best Children's Series: Bluey — Joe Brumm, Charlie Aspinwall, Sam Moor, Daley Pearson (ABC); Are You Tougher Than Your Ancestors? — Vanna Morosini, Stu Connolly, Donna Andrews (ABC); First Day — Julie Kalceff, Kirsty Stark, Kate Croser (ABC); The Inbestigators — Robyn Butler, Wayne Hope (ABC); Little J & Big Cuz — Tony Thorne, Ned Lander, Colin South, Alicia Rackett (NITV); Mustangs FC — Amanda Higgs, Rachel Davis, Debbie Lee (ABC) | Best Screenplay: Stateless Elise McCredie — Episode 1: The Circumstances in Which They Come; The Commons - Shelley Birse — Episode 1; First Day - Julie Kalceff — Episode 1; Mystery Road – "Broken" Kodie Bedford — Episode 4; Operation Buffalo - Peter Duncan — Episode 4 |
| Best Lead Actor – Drama: Fayssal Bazzi — Stateless; Bryan Brown — Bloom; Jai Courtney — Stateless; Ewen Leslie — Operation Buffalo; Aaron Pedersen — Mystery Road | Best Lead Actress – Drama: Yvonne Strahovski — Stateless; Jada Alberts — Mystery Road; Rebecca Gibney — Halifax: Retribution; Asher Keddie — Stateless; Pamela Rabe — Wentworth |
| Best Guest or Supporting Actor – Drama: Darren Gilshenan — Stateless; Rob Collins — Mystery Road; Damon Herriman — The Commons; Callan Mulvey — Mystery Road; Ed Oxenbould — Bloom | Best Guest or Supporting Actress – Drama: Cate Blanchett — Stateless; Jacqueline McKenzie — Bloom; Ngaire Pigram — Mystery Road; Tasma Walton — Mystery Road; Jacki Weaver — Bloom |
| Best Comedy Performer: Tim Minchin — Upright; Milly Alcock — Upright; Anne Edmonds — At Home Alone Together; Luke McGregor — Rosehaven; Celia Pacquola — Rosehaven | Best Subscription Television Presenter: Rebel Wilson - Lol: Last One Laughing Australia; Shaynna Blaze Selling Houses Australia; Deborah Hutton Find Me a Beach House; Tyson Mayr Bear - Koala Hero; Andrew Winter Selling Houses Australia / Love it or List it Australia |
| Best Direction in a Television Drama or Comedy: Emma Freeman — Stateless; Simon Francis — Australian Amazon Original Stand-up Specials; Wayne Blair — Mystery Road; Warwick Thornton — Mystery Road; Jocelyn Moorehouse — Stateless | Best Non-Fiction Television Direction: Larissa Behrendt — Maralinga Tjarutja; Nick Robinson — Australia's Ocean Odyssey: A Journey Down the East Australian Current; Mark Joffe — Lindy Chamberlain: The True Story; Cian O’Clery — Love on the Spectrum; Adrian Brown — The Test: A New Era for Australia's Team |
| Best Cinematography in Television: Stateless — Bonnie Elliott – Episode 1: The Circumstances in Which They Come; The Commons — Earle Dresner — Episode 1; The Gloaming — Marden Dean — Episode 4: Black Winged Angels; Mystery Road — Warwick Thorton — Episode 4: Broken; Operation Buffalo — Martin McGrath — Episode 4 | Best Editing in Television: Stateless — Mark Atkin — Episode 1: The Circumstances in Which They Come; Mystery Road — Nicholas Holmes — Episode 6: What You Do Now; Operation Buffalo — Mark Perry — Episode 4; Stateless — Martin Connor — Episode 6: The Seventh |
| Best Sound in Television: Stateless — Tom Heuzenroeder, Pete Smith, Michael Darren, Des Kenneally — Episode 1: The Circumstances in Which They Come; The Gloaming — Dean Ryan, Andrew Neil, Ralph Ortner, Lee Yee — Episode 4: Black Winged Angels; Halifax: Retribution — Paul Pirola, Brendan Croxon, James Harvey, Andrew Ramage — Episode 3; Mystery Road — Wes Chew, Luke Mynott, Michael Newton, Trevor Hope — Episode 4: Broken; Operation Buffalo — Luke Mynott, Wes Chew, Guntis Sics — Episode 4 | Best Original Music Score in Television: Stateless — Cornel Wilczek — Episode 6: The Seventh; Bluey — Joff Bush — Episode 24: Flatpack; Itch — Diego Baldenweg with Nora Baldenweg and Lionel Baldenweg — Episode 10: 376 Down; Operation Buffalo — Antony Partos — Episode 4; Rosehaven — Kit Warhurst — Episode 8 |
| Best Production Design in Television: Stateless — Melinda Doring — Episode 1: The Circumstances in Which They Come; The Commons — Tim Ferrier — Episode 1; Mystery Road — Herbert Pinter — Episode 6: What You Do Now; The New Legends of Monkey — Nick Williams — Episode 10: Shadow Boxing; Operation Buffalo — Colin Gibson — Episode 4 | Best Costume Design in Television: Stateless — Mariot Kerr — Episode 1: The Circumstances in Which They Come; The Commons — Xanthe Heubei — Episode 1; The Masked Singer — Tim Chappel — Episode 4; The New Legends of Monkey — Liz McGregor — Episode 10: Shadow Boxing; Operation Buffalo — Wendy Cork — Episode 4 |

== Documentary ==
| Best Documentary: Firestarter – The Story of Bangarra — Nel Minchin, Wayne Blair, Ivan O’Mahoney; Brazen Hussies — Catherine Dwyer, Andrea Foxworthy, Philippa Campey; Brock: Over the Top — Kriv Stenders, Veronica Fury, Alan Erson, Ruby Schmidt; Looky Looky Here Comes Cooky — Steven McGregor, Danielle MacLean, Anna Grieve, Steven Thomas; Slim & I — Kriv Stenders, Chris Brown, Aline Jacques, James Arneman; Suzi Q — Liam Firmager, Tait Brady | Best Documentary or Factual Program: Murder in the Outback: The Falconio and Lees Mystery — Andrew Farrell, Matt Campbell, Bethan Arwel-Lewis, Sophie Meyrick (Seven Network); Ambulance Australia — Margaret Bashfield, Debbie Cuell, Matthew Tomszewski (Network Ten); Fight for Planet A: Our Climate Challenge — Jodi Boylan, David Galloway (ABC); Lindy Chamberlain: The True Story — Ian Collie, Rob Gibson, Francine Finnane, Mark Joffe (Network Ten); Maralinga Tjarutja — Darren Dale, Jacob Hickey (ABC); Shaun Micallef's On The Sauce — Andrew Farrell, Shaun Micallef, Paula Bycroft, Matt Campbell (ABC) |
| Best Editing in a Documentary: Can Art Stop a Bullet: William Kelly's Big Picture — Daniela Raulli; Firestarter – The Story of Bangarra — Nick Meyers, Karen Johnson; Maralinga Tjarutja — Jane Usher; Revelation — Philippa Rowlands — Episode 3: Goliath; The Test: A New Era for Australia's Team — Adam Wright — Episode 7: Under Siege | Best Cinematography in a Documentary: Australia's Ocean Odyssey: A Journey Down the East Australian Current — Nick Robinson, Jon Shaw, Caspar Mazzotti, Cam Batten; Revelation — Aaron Smith, Andy Taylor, Martin McGrath — Episode 1: The Children Have Been Used by the Devil; Sea Lions: Life by a Whisker — Jon Shaw, Cam Batten, Tim Nagle, David Gross; The Test: A New Era for Australia's Team — Andre Mauger, Oliver West — Episode 7: Under Siege; Viva the Underdogs — Allan Hardy, Cam Pianta |
| Best Original Music Score in a Documentary: Brazen Hussies — Amanda Brown; Australia's Ocean Odyssey: A Journey Down the East Australian Current — Hylton Mowday; Guy Sebastian: The Man The Music — Guy Sebastian; Machine — Matteo Zingales; Quilty – Painting the Shadows — Amanda Brown, Damien Lane | Best Sound in a Documentary: Suzi Q — Emma Bortignon, Paul Shanahan, David Williams, Gemma Stack; Brazen Hussies — Emma Bortignon, Simon Rosenberg, Jed Palmer, Guy Blackman; Can Art Stop A Bullet: William Kelly's Big Picture — David Muir, Mark Street, Doron Kipen; Firestarter – The Story of Bangarra — Angus Robertson, Tara Webb, Leah Katz, Nick Meyers; Wild Things — Michael Gissing, Steven Robinson |

== Short film and online ==
| Best Short Film: The Mirror — Joel Kohn, Mike Horvath, Tom Davies; Chicken — Alana Hicks); Chlorine — Melissa Anastasi, Jessica Carrera; I Want to Make a Film About Women — Karen Pearlman, Richard James Allen, Meg White, Caitlin Yeo; Idol — Alex Wu; The Moogai — Jon Bell, Samantha Jennings, Taylor Goddard, Mitchell Stanley, Kristina Ceyton | Best Short Animation |
| Best Online Drama or Comedy: Love in Lockdown — Robyn Butler, Wayne Hope, Lucy Durack, Eddie Perfect; Ding Dong I'm Gay — Joshua Longhurst, Tim Spencer, Rosie Braye, Sarah Bishop; Girl, Interpreted — Grace Feng Fang Juan, Nikki Tran; Halal Gurls — Vonne Patiag, Petra Lovrencic; KGB — Dan Riches, Luke Riches, Taryne Laffar, Lauren Elliott; Patricia Moore — Chris Thompson, Blake Fraser | Best Online Entertainment: The Norris Nuts — Sabre Norris, Sockie Norris, Biggy Norris, Naz Norris; Bounce Patrol — Shannon Jones; Chloe Ting — Chloe Ting; Do Go On — Dave Warneke, Matt Stewart, Jess Perkins, Evan Munro-Smith, Emma Sharp; Fairbairn Films — Lachlan Fairbairn, Jaxon Fairbairn, Darcy Ahrns; Mighty Car Mods — Marty Mulholland, Blair Joscelyne |

== Additional awards ==
Best Asian Film
- Better Days (China) — Derek Tsang and Xu Yuezhen
  - Beasts Clawing at Straws (South Korea) — Kim Yong-hoon, Billy Acumen
  - Chhapaak (India) — Meghna Gulzar, Deepika Padukone
  - The Eight Hundred (China) — Guan Hu, Wang Zhonglei, Liang Jing
  - First Love (Japan) (United Kingdom) — Takashi Miike, Muneyuki Kii, Misakoi Saka, Jeremy Thomas
  - Shubh Mangal Zyada Saavdhan (India) — Hitesh Kewalya, Aanand L. Rai, Bhushan Kumar, Himanshu Sharma, Krishan Kumar
  - Thappad (India) — Anubhav Sinha, Bhushan Kumar, Krishan Kumar, Vinod Bhanushali
  - Peninsula (South Korea) — Sang-ho Yeon, Dong-Ha Lee
  - The Wild Goose Lake (China) (France) — Yi’nan Diao, Yang Shen, Michel Merkt
