= Blind Company =

2009 film by Alkinos Tsilimidos

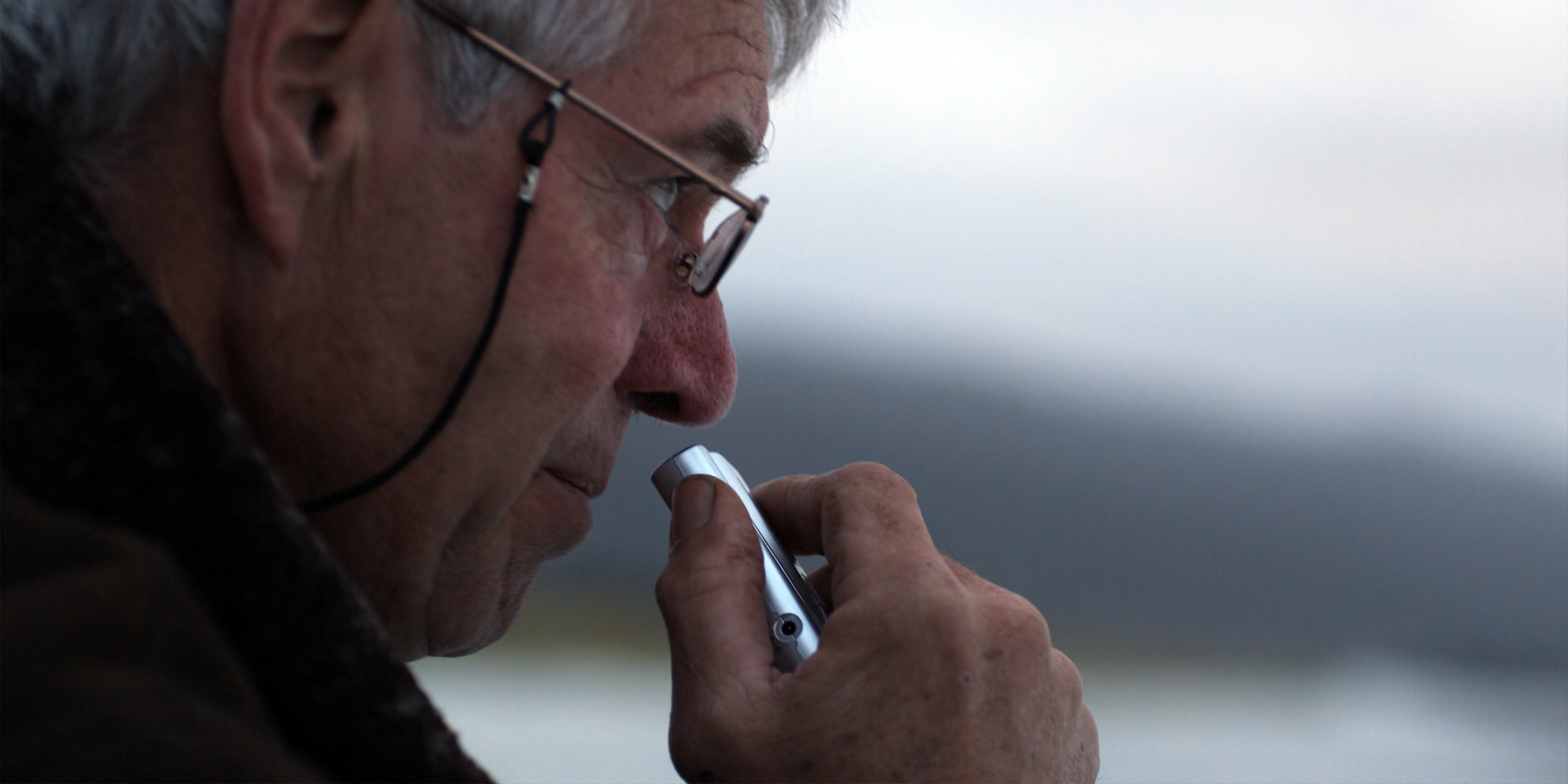
- Colin Friels
- Directed by: Alkinos Tsilimidos
- Written by: Austin Pendleton
- Produced by: John Finemore; Alkinos Tsilimidos
- Starring: Colin Friels; Gloria Ajenstat; Nick Barkla; Sarah Hallam; Samuel Johnson
- Cinematography: Adam Arkapaw
- Music by: Matt Davis; Michael Emena
- Distributed by: Titan View; Arclight Films International
- Release date: 7 August 2009 (Melbourne)
- Running time: 98 minutes
- Country: Australia
- Language: English

Blind Company is a 2009 feature film directed by Melbourne auteur Alkinos Tsilimidos and starring Colin Friels. It premiered at the 2009 Melbourne International Film Festival.

== Development ==
Blind Company is adapted from Austin Pendleton’s stage production Uncle Bob. Nick Barkla who plays Josh in Blind Company met Austin Pendleton while studying acting at the Steppenwolf Theatre Company, an ensemble-based film company of actors, writers and directors. Barkla won the 2007 AFI fellowship of $20,000 to observe their collaborative method of working – an approach that led directly to the making of this film. When Barkla returned to Australia he produced the play and acted in it for Red Stitch Theatre Company.

Director Alkinos Tsilimidos saw the production in Melbourne and became interested in writing the adaptation. Tsilimidos had worked with both Nick Barkla and Colin Friels on previous films, such as Tom White and Em4Jay. Tsilimidos states his interest in the film is due to its exploration of people "who have given up on the world".

== Plot ==
Geoff Brewster is seeing out his final days at the family's isolated coastal shack – walking the beach and leaving tape-recorded confessions for his estranged wife, Sally. Geoff, we learn, is dying, and will soon begin to lose his sight. But the peace of the coastal shack is shattered when his nephew, Josh (Nick Barkla, Em 4 Jay) arrives at the house, volatile and apparently hostile, at the wheel of a Porsche, announcing that he has come to stay. It's not clear at first why he has come or what he wants from Geoff. But his presence will spark a deadly game between both men that will threaten to destroy them both.

== Production ==
Blind Company was shot in Bicheno, Tasmania in September 2008. The shoot took three weeks.

The film was shot in a dark, deliberately obscuring style on the red camera by cinematographer Adam Arkapaw. Colin Friels and Nick Barkla lived in the house during the shoot period. The rest of the crew lived in Bicheno in hotels.

=== Budget ===
Blind Company was privately financed on a micro budget. Nick Barkla identified the Porsche as one of the most expensive components of the film, estimating the car at $350,000.

== Reception ==
Blind Company premiered at the 2009 Melbourne International Film Festival. It polarised critics, some applauding it for its challenging characters and story, while others found the film slow and suffering from a weak script. Variety noted that the unraveling of the character's secrets was more confusing than compelling. Critics applauded the performances of the film, and the cinematography by Adam Arkapaw, who has gone on to shoot the widely acclaimed, Animal Kingdom. Margaret Pomeranz awarded the film three and a half stars and David Stratton awarded the film two and a half stars on ABC's At the Movies. Stratton noted the film was slow, particularly at the beginning.

=== Festivals ===
- Official Selection World Film Festival Montreal – 2009
- Official Selection Melbourne International Film Festival – 2009
