= Nick Barkla =

Australian actor

- Education: Atlantic Theater; Steppenwolf Theater
- Occupation: Actor
- Years active: 1997–present
- Notable work: Em 4 Jay; Embedded; Blind Company
- Spouse: Laura Gordon

Nick Barkla is an Australian actor, known for his roles in the films Em 4 Jay, Embedded and Blind Company.

== Early life ==
Barkla undertook his acting studies at the Atlantic Theater in New York, Steppenwolf Theater in Chicago, and with Margie Haber in Los Angeles. He also studied dialects and voice with Anna McCrossin-Owen, Jessica Drake, Jenny Kent and Tyler Coppin.

== Career ==
Barkla has appeared in television guest roles in The Doctor Blake Mysteries, Rush, The Secret Life of Us and Blue Heelers. In 2024 he had a recurring a recurring role in U.S. series Hotel Cocaine.

Barkla's first film role was in 2004 drama Tom White (alongside Colin Friels). He has played the lead roles in the films Em 4 Jay (2008, opposite Laura Gordon), Blind Company (2009, with Colin Friels again) and Embedded (2016, once more with Laura Gordon).

He has also appeared on stage in Uncle Bob at Red Stitch Actors Theatre in 2002 (upon which the film Blind Company was based), and A Steady Rain at Sydney's Old Fitzroy Theatre in 2015.

Barkla directed and produced award-winning documentary film The Healing.

In 2007 Barkla received the first AFI Fellowship.

== Personal life ==
Barkla is married to fellow actress Laura Gordon, with whom he starred in Em 4 Jay, Embedded and Hotel Cocaine.

== Filmography ==
=== Film (as actor) ===
Year	Title	Role	Notes
2004	Tom White	Darren Burrows	Feature film
2005	Rupture	The Friend	Short film
2006	Em 4 Jay	Jay	Feature film
2010	Blind Company	Josh Brewster	Feature film
2012	Lest We Forget	Trevor	Short film
2012	Road to Recovery	Eric	Short film
2016	Embedded	Frank	Feature film
2019	Tâm	DJ	Short film
2023	US	Gavin	

=== Film (as producer/director/writer) ===
Year	Title	Role	Notes
2019	Tâm	Associate Producer	Short film
2010	Blind Company	Associate Producer	Feature film
2011	Hail	Executive Producer	Feature film
2014	Inside Fighter	Director / Producer / Writer / Cinematographer	
2019	The Horses	Director / Producer / Co-writer	Documentary short film
2023	The Healing	Director / Producer / Writer	Documentary feature film

=== Television ===
Year	Title	Role	Notes
1997	Blue Heelers	Byron Helford	TV series, season 4, episode 16: "Lean on Me"
1999	Blue Heelers	Craig Ryan	TV series, season 6, episode 17: "The Stag"
2002	Blue Heelers	Campbell Ferguson	TV series, season 9, episode 27: "The Last Jar"
2002	The Secret Life of Us	Tom	TV series, season 2, episode 9: "Controlling the Universe"
2011	Rush	Detective Reynolds	TV series, season 4, episode 6: "In His Nature"
2015	The Doctor Blake Mysteries	Alec Richardson	TV series, season 4, episode 6: "A Difficult Lie"
2024	Hotel Cocaine	Congressman Landon	TV series, 4 episodes

== Theatre ==
Year	Title	Role	Venue / Co.
1999	Equus	Alan Strang	
2002	The Lights	Various	
2002	Uncle Bob	Josh	Red Stitch Actors Theatre
2003	A-Framed	Simon / Damian	The Store Room, Melbourne
2006	Sugar Mountain		Cinema Nova, Melbourne
2014	Glengarry Glen Ross	Williamson	Southbank Theatre, Melbourne with MTC
2015	A Steady Rain	Joey	Old Fitzroy Theatre, Sydney with Red Line Productions

== Awards ==
Year	Work	Award	Category	Result
2007	Nick Barkla	AFI Awards	Fellowship Award	Won
2016	Inside Fighter	Melbourne Documentary Film Festival	Audience Award	Nominated
2019	The Horses	One-Reeler Short Film Competition	Award of Excellence	Won
2022	The Healing	Santa Monica Film Festival	Best Documentary Feature	Nominated (Honourable Mention)
2022	The Healing	Veterans Film Festival	Best Short Film	Won
