= Carma Sharon =

Israeli-Australian actress (born 1971)

- כרמית שרון
- Born: February 20, 1971 (age 55); Tel Aviv
- Occupations: Actress, director, producer, singer
- Years active: 2015–present

Carma Sharon (Hebrew: כרמית שרון, [kaʁˈmit ʃaˈʁon]) is an actress, director and producer, based in Sydney, Australia. She played the title role in the 2018 film iBOT.

== Life and career ==
Carma was born in Tel Aviv, Israel. Her father was a theatrical actor, mother was a model and her siblings have been involved with singing and performing. She graduated from Trinity College London, with a diploma of musical theatre. She has made her TV debut in the series Deadly Women.

== Filmography ==
=== Film ===
Year	Title	Role	Notes
2015	The Plan	Kim	Short film
2015	Unbreakable	Sarah	Short film
2016	Embedded	Crazy Lady in Market	Feature film
2016	Sheep in Fog	Samone	
2015	The System	Office lady	
2017	The Bard	Back Up Singer	Short film
2017	Innocent Killer	News Reporter	
2017	The Tunche	Ms Tunchicunata	
2017	Bindii	Emily	Short film
2017	The Solution	Psychologist	Short film
2018	A Very Odd Engagement	Diane	Short film
2018	Pimped	Day of the Dead	
2018	Dirt	Esther	Short film
2018	Dead Squad: Temple of the Undead	Nurse	
2018	iBOT	Ibot	
2018	Hello Au Revoir		
2018	Restoration	Jessica	Short film
2018	Nice Shirt	Jamie	Short film
2018	Life on Earth: Severance	News Reporter	
2019	Eleni's Confessions	Katerina	Short film
2019	The Digger	Stacey	Short film
2019	The File	Meital	Short film
2019	A Magnificent Specimen	Dahlia	Short film
2020	R.S.V.P	Maya	filming

=== Television ===
Year	Title	Role	Notes
2014–2019	Deadly Women	Joe's Mother / Jamila M'barek / Julia	4 episodes
2015	Abandoned	District Survivor	1 episode
2018	Atomic Kingdom	Leena	1 episode
2018	Terahvin	Ritu	TV movie
2019	The Commons	Nurse Mumford	1 episode

=== Documentary ===
Year	Title	Role	Notes
2019	That's Not a Knife	Herself	Post-production

=== As Director ===
- 2019 - Time Travel (short film)
- 2019 - The File (short film)

=== As Producer ===
- 2018 - A Very Odd Engagement (short film)
- 2019 - Time Travel (short film)
- 2019 - The Digger (short film)
- 2019 - The File (short film)
