= The Taverna =

2019 film by Alkinos Tsilimidos

- Promotional poster
- Directed by: Alkinos Tsilimidos
- Screenplay by: Alkinos Tsilimidos
- Produced by: Alkinos Tsilimidos; Jayden James
- Starring: Vangelis Mourikis; Rachel Kamath; Senol Mat; Tottie Goldsmith
- Production company: Rescued Films
- Release dates: 20 October 2019 (Greek Film Festival); 2 July 2020 (Australia)
- Running time: 86 minutes
- Country: Australia
- Language: English
- Box office: $21,695

The Taverna is a 2019 Australian black comedy film directed by Alkinos Tsilimidos. Starring Vangelis Mourikis, the film is set inside a Melbourne Greek restaurant in the span of one night. Initially premiering at the Greek Film Festival at Melbourne and Sydney in October 2019, the commercial release of The Taverna was delayed due to the COVID-19 pandemic, ultimately releasing in Australian cinemas on 2 July 2020. The film grossed $21,695 at the Australian box office.

== Plot summary ==
Kostas owns a Greek restaurant, the White Village Greek Taverna, in the suburbs of Melbourne, Australia. On a packed night, belly dancer Jamila performs for the crowd, but refuses to go out again after spotting her ex-husband Arman dining with his new partner Rebecca. Sally, one of the waitstaff at the restaurant and a prospective actress, offers to belly dance in place of Jamila, setting off a chaotic chain of events.

== Cast ==
- Vangelis Mourikis as Kostas
- Rachel Kamath as Jamila
- Senol Mat as Omer
- Emmanuela Costaras as Katerina
- Emily O'Brien-Brown as Sally
- Peter Paltos as Arman
- Tottie Goldsmith as Rebecca
- Salman Arif as Samir

== Production and themes ==
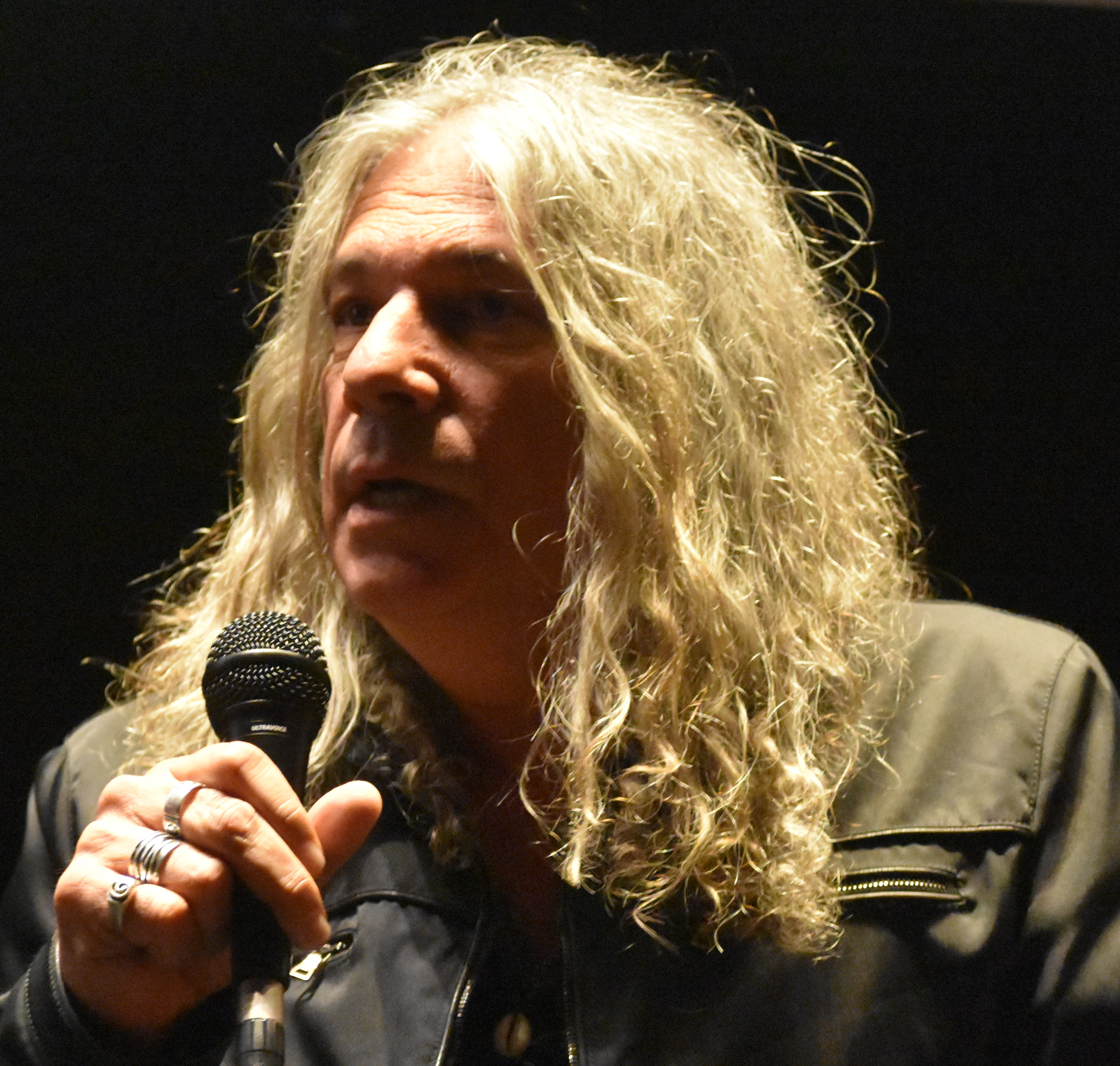
Alkinos Tsilimidos directed The Taverna.

The Taverna was filmed in the White Village Tavern, a Greek restaurant in the Melbourne suburb of Elsternwick. It was shot across sixteen days during the summer of 2019. Alkinos Tsilimidos, the film's director, stated that he was inspired by the style of cinema verite, saying "I wanted audiences to experience a personal relationship with the characters as if they were subjects of a documentary". Tsilimidos has called The Taverna his "most personal film", due to his childhood recollections of eating in Greek restaurants as a Greek Australian, which he said "led to an overwhelming feeling of belonging". Tsilimidos has stated (as per the Australian Arts Review) that he often held wrap parties following his productions at the White Village Tavern. The film has been described as a black comedy. Vangelis Mourikis, who plays Kostas in The Taverna, said that the common ground in the film was the food of the taverna, which he connected to Hestia, the ancient Greek goddess of the hearth.

== Release ==
The Taverna received its world premiere on 20 October 2019 at the Greek Film Festival, screened both at Melbourne's Astor Theatre and in Sydney. Initially planned to be released to Australian cinemas on 30 April 2020, the COVID-19 pandemic and subsequent lockdowns delayed the release to 2 July 2020. The film was released to cinemas in Melbourne, Sydney, and Adelaide, as well as Palace Cinemas locations across Australia, on 2 July. Per Box Office Mojo, The Taverna grossed $9,835 on its opening weekend, for a total of $21,695 at the Australian box office. The Taverna was also screened at the 2025 edition of the Greek Film Festival.

== Critical reception ==
Jake Wilson of The Age gave The Taverna three out of five stars, complimenting the "abundant charisma" of Mourikis, and remarking that Tsilimidos has a tendency to push the film towards drama due to his directorial oeuvre, which Wilson considered to be "a strength on the whole", despite creating confusion in regards to "certain plot twists". FilmInk's review of The Taverna described it as "a true delight", noting the film as a "left turn" within Tsilimidos' filmography. FilmInk also praised the cast's performance as authentic and befitting the context of a suburban Greek restaurant. Writing for Heavy magazine, Dave Griffiths called the plot of the film both "simple" and "extremely entertaining", noting the naturalism of the film, which Griffiths connected to theatre. Griffiths lauded the acting performance of the cast, describing The Taverna as having "one of the best ensemble casts I have seen in Australian cinema over the past few years".
