= Babyteeth (film) =

2019 film

- Official release poster
- Directed by: Shannon Murphy
- Screenplay by: Rita Kalnejais
- Based on: Babyteeth by Rita Kalnejais
- Produced by: Alex White
- Starring: Eliza Scanlen; Toby Wallace; Emily Barclay; Eugene Gilfedder; Essie Davis; Ben Mendelsohn
- Cinematography: Andrew Commis
- Edited by: Stephen Evans
- Music by: Amanda Brown
- Production companies: Screen Australia; Entertainment One; Whitefalk Films; Jan Chapman Films; Spectrum Films; Create NSW
- Distributed by: Universal Pictures
- Release dates: 4 September 2019 (Venice); 23 July 2020 (Australia)
- Running time: 118 minutes
- Country: Australia
- Language: English
- Box office: $1 million

Babyteeth is a 2019 Australian coming-of-age comedy-drama film directed by Shannon Murphy from a screenplay by Rita Kalnejais, based upon her stage play of the same name. It stars Eliza Scanlen (in her first film appearance), Toby Wallace, Emily Barclay, Eugene Gilfedder, Essie Davis, and Ben Mendelsohn. The film had its world premiere at the Venice Film Festival on 4 September 2019. It was released in Australia on 23 July 2020 by Universal Pictures and won nine AACTA awards, including Best Film.

Scanlen plays Milla, a 16-year-old girl from a wealthy family who falls in love with a drug-addict named Moses shortly before she has a cancer recurrence.

== Plot ==
Milla Finlay is a 16-year-old school girl, recently diagnosed with cancer. On her way home from school one day she meets 23-year-old Moses on a railway platform, and he almost immediately asks her for money. Milla quickly develops a crush on Moses and introduces him to her parents: Anna, a musician, and Henry, a psychiatrist. Both are uncomfortable with Moses due to the age difference between him and Milla, but are permissive due to Milla's illness.

A while later, Anna wakes up at night and discovers Moses in the process of robbing the family for prescription drugs. Milla and Henry wake up and are alerted to the situation, but while Henry wants to call the police Milla pleads for leniency, which Anna allows, noticing how much happier Milla is with Moses. The following day Anna warns Moses to stay away from her daughter.

Moses continues to visit Milla at school. After she tracks him down one night Moses takes her on his drug runs and then to a party. They later spend the night together on a rooftop, where Moses abandons Milla. Her distraught parents eventually track the weakened Milla down and take her to the hospital.

Aware that they are unable to stop the relationship between Milla and Moses, Henry and Anna become more permissive of their relationship allowing Moses to frequently visit her. When Milla gets ill at home, Anna realises that Moses had stolen her medication. Milla becomes angry, believing that Moses is using her for her father's access to drugs, and kicks him out of her home.

Later Henry tracks Moses down and asks him to come live with the family, promising him access to drugs as long as he continues to make Milla happy. For a while, the family and Moses live in a kind of harmony, until Milla discovers her father is drugging Moses. She gets angry and asks Moses to leave. He eventually comes back and goes through withdrawal in an attempt to stay sober, prioritising his relationship with Milla over his drug addiction.

After Milla's 17th birthday party, a happy occasion, she reveals to Moses that she is in constant pain and knows the end is near. She begs Moses to kill her by suffocation, but he cannot go through with it. Instead, the two have sex for the first time.

The following day Anna and Henry realise that Milla had sex the previous night and are happy for their daughter. When Anna goes to give Milla water in bed after Moses leaves the bedroom, she discovers that she had died during the night.

In a flashback, Henry remembers a day with Milla at the beach. She tells him she is at peace with dying and asks him to take care of Moses when she is gone. Henry, in turn, promises that he and Anna will be okay when she dies.

== Cast ==
- Eliza Scanlen as Milla Finlay
- Toby Wallace as Moses
- Essie Davis as Anna Finlay
- Ben Mendelsohn as Henry Finlay
- Emily Barclay as Toby
- Eugene Gilfedder as Gidon
- Edward Lau as Tin Wah
- Zach Grech as Isaac
- Georgina Symes as Polly
- Michelle Lotters as Scarlett
- Andrea Demetriades as Jenny
- Arka Das as Shaun

== Production ==
The coming-of-age comedy-drama Babyteeth was directed by Shannon Murphy from a screenplay by Rita Kalnejais, based upon her stage play of the same name. It was produced by Alex White, with Screen Australia, Entertainment One, Whitefalk Films, Jan Chapman Films, Spectrum Films, and Create NSW involved.

Andrew Commis was responsible for the cinematography, and Amanda Brown composed the score. Editing was by Stephen Evans.

== Release and reception ==
Babyteeth had its world premiere at the Venice International Film Festival on 4 September 2019, where it competed for the Golden Lion. It also screened at the BFI London Film Festival on 6 October 2019, where it competed in the First Feature Competition. Shortly after, IFC Films and Picturehouse Entertainment acquired US and UK distribution rights to the film, respectively.

The film was released in the United States on 19 June 2020, and in Australia on 23 July 2020 by Universal Pictures.

=== Critical response ===
Babyteeth received positive reviews from film critics, when it screened at the Venice Film Festival. On review aggregator Rotten Tomatoes, it holds a score of 94% based on reviews from 154 critics with an average score of 7.70/10, The site's critics consensus reads: "Powerfully acted and sensitively directed, Babyteeth offers audiences a coming-of-age story that's messier – and more rewarding – than most." On Metacritic, the film has a weighted average score of 77 out of 100, based on 30 critics, indicating "generally favorable reviews".

David Ehrlich of IndieWire gave the film "B+", calling it "a movie that's off-kilter but always raw; delicate, but never precious". Variety's Guy Lodge describes it as an "arresting feature debut for both director Shannon Murphy and screenwriter Rita Kalnejais". Michael O'Sullivan of the Houston Chronicle praised Babyteeth, stating that it "works precisely because it refuses to accommodate expectation."

Kevin Maher of The Times gave the film five stars and described it as an "emotionally shattering feature debut from Shannon Murphy".

=== Awards and nominations ===
Award	Date of ceremony	Category	Recipient(s)	Result	Ref.
Venice Film Festival	7 September 2019	Golden Lion	Babyteeth	Nominated	
Venice Film Festival	7 September 2019	SIGNIS Award	Babyteeth	Won	
Venice Film Festival	7 September 2019	Premio Soundtrack Stars Award: Special Jury Prize	Babyteeth	Won	
Venice Film Festival	7 September 2019	Adele and Christopher Smithers Award	Babyteeth	Won	
Venice Film Festival	7 September 2019	Marcello Mastroianni Award	Toby Wallace	Won	
Brussels International Film Festival (BRIFF)	September 2020	Grand Prix, International Competition	Babyteeth (Milla)	Won	
AACTA Awards	30 November 2020	Best Film	Alex White	Won	
AACTA Awards	30 November 2020	Best Direction	Shannon Murphy	Won	
AACTA Awards	30 November 2020	Best Screenplay, Original or Adapted	Rita Kalnejais	Won	
AACTA Awards	30 November 2020	Best Actor in a Leading Role	Toby Wallace	Won	
AACTA Awards	30 November 2020	Best Actress in a Leading Role	Eliza Scanlen	Won	
AACTA Awards	30 November 2020	Best Actor in a Supporting Role	Ben Mendelsohn	Won	
AACTA Awards	30 November 2020	Best Actress in a Supporting Role	Essie Davis	Won	
AACTA Awards	30 November 2020	Best Cinematography	Andrew Commis	Nominated	
AACTA Awards	30 November 2020	Best Editing	Steve Evans	Nominated	
AACTA Awards	30 November 2020	Best Original Music Score	Amanda Brown	Won	
AACTA Awards	30 November 2020	Best Sound	Sam Hayward, Angus Robertson, Rick Lisle, Nick Emond	Nominated	
AACTA Awards	30 November 2020	Best Production Design	Sherree Philips	Nominated	
AACTA Awards	30 November 2020	Best Casting	Kirsty McGregor, Stevie Ray	Won	
AACTA Awards	6 March 2021	Best International Actress	Eliza Scanlen	Nominated	
AACTA Awards	6 March 2021	Best International Supporting Actor	Ben Mendelsohn	Nominated	
Guldbagge Awards	25 January 2021	Best Foreign Film	Shannon Murphy	Nominated	
British Independent Film Awards	22 February 2021	Best International Independent Film	Shannon Murphy, Alex White and Rita Kalnejais	Nominated	
BAFTA Awards	11 April 2021	Best Direction	Shannon Murphy	Nominated	
AWGIE Awards	7 December 2021	Best Screenplay, Feature Film – Adapted	Rita Kalnejais	Nominated	
