= Embedded (film) =

- Directed by: Stephen Sewell
- Written by: Stephen Sewell
- Produced by: Steve Jaggi
- Starring: Nick Barkla; Laura Gordon; Ryan Harrison; Marcus Johnson; Peter Phelps
- Cinematography: Rhiannon Bannenberg
- Edited by: Adrian Powers
- Music by: Matt Rudduck, Ned McPhie
- Production company: The Steve Jaggi Company
- Release date: 2016
- Running time: 82 minutes
- Country: Australia
- Language: English

Embedded is a 2016 erotic political thriller film written and directed by Stephen Sewell and produced by Steve Jaggi, which sees a war correspondent meet an alluring, enigmatic woman at a cocktail party, before a dangerous power play engulfs the two. The film stars Nick Barkla, Laura Gordon, Ryan Harrison, Marcus Johnson and Peter Phelps. The film premiered at the Sydney Film Festival to generally positive reviews, with Variety calling it a "diamond like work", while The Iris called Embedded "a compelling watch."

== Cast ==
- Nick Barkla as Frank
- Laura Gordon as Madeline
- Peter Phelps as Cassidy
- Ryan Harrison as Lance Corporal Jackson
- Marcus Johnson as Porter
- Rosie Lourde as Jade
- Jak Wyld as Sergent Henderson
- Carma Sharon as Crazy Lady in Market
