= People's Choice Awards (Australia) =

Pop culture awards show

The Australian People's Choice Awards was an Australian version of the American awards show, People's Choice Awards, staged in 1998 and 1999. The awards recognised works of popular culture and people active in it. Winners were chosen by popular vote.

== Winners and nominees ==
=== 1998 ===
Category	Winner	Nominees
Favourite TV Star	Lisa McCune, Blue Heelers, Seven Network	Colin Friels, Water Rats, Nine Network; Rebecca Gibney, Halifax f.p., Nine Network; Ray Martin, A Current Affair, Nine Network
Favourite Australian Movie	Amy	Crackers; Joey; The Wiggles Movie
Favourite Australian Movie Star (Male)	Mel Gibson	Russell Crowe; Ben Mendelsohn; Guy Pearce
Favourite Australian Movie Star (Female)	Nicole Kidman	Toni Collette; Rebecca Gibney; Rachel Griffiths
Favourite International Movie	Titanic	As Good as It Gets; The Full Monty; The Horse Whisperer
Favourite International Movie Star (Male)	Mel Gibson	Leonardo DiCaprio; Harrison Ford; Brad Pitt
Favourite International Movie Star (Female)	Nicole Kidman	Jodie Foster; Meg Ryan; Kate Winslet
Favourite Sporting Event Shown On TV	1998 Commonwealth Games, Nine Network	AFL Grand Final, Seven Network; Tennis - 1998 US Open, Nine Network; World Swimming Championship - Perth, Seven Network
Favourite Sports Star (Male)	Pat Rafter - Tennis	Mick Doohan - Motorcycle sport Kieren Perkins - Swimming; Ian Thorpe - Swimming
Favourite Sports Star (Female)	Susie O'Neill - Swimming	Cathy Freeman - Athletics; Nova Peris-Kneebone - Hockey and Athletics; Samantha Riley - Swimming
Favourite Australian Singer (Male)	John Farnham	Jimmy Barnes; Neil Finn; Anthony Warlow
Favourite Australian Singer (Female)	Natalie Imbruglia	Tina Arena; Kylie Minogue; Olivia Newton-John
Favourite International TV Show	Friends, Nine Network	Ally McBeal, Seven Network; Heartbeat, ABC TV and Seven Network; Keeping Up Appearances, ABC TV
Favourite TV Drama or Serial	Blue Heelers, Seven Network	All Saints, Seven Network; Home and Away, Seven Network; Water Rats, Nine Network
Favourite Actor in a Drama or Serial	Colin Friels, Water Rats, Nine Network	Marcus Graham, Good Guys Bad Guys, Nine Network; Martin Sacks, Blue Heelers, Seven Network; John Wood, Blue Heelers, Seven Network
Favourite Actress in a Drama or Serial	Lisa McCune, Blue Heelers, Seven Network	Belinda Emmett, Home and Away, Seven Network; Rebecca Gibney, Halifax f.p., Nine Network; Georgie Parker, All Saints, Seven Network
Favourite Comedy Show	Hey Hey It's Saturday, Nine Network	Australia's Funniest Home Video Show, Nine Network; Good News Week, ABC TV and Network Ten; The Panel, Network Ten
Favourite Comedy Star	Magda Szubanski	Russell Gilbert; Jimeoin; Daryl Somers, Hey Hey It's Saturday, Nine Network
Favourite Current Affairs Show	Today Tonight, Seven Network	60 Minutes, Nine Network; A Current Affair, Nine Network; Foreign Correspondent, ABC TV
Favourite Lifestyle Show	Better Homes and Gardens, Seven Network	Burke's Backyard, Nine Network; Getaway, Nine Network; The Great Outdoors, Seven Network
Favourite TV Commercial	Coca-Cola - Polar Bears	Campbell's Chicken Noodle Soup - Two Kids; Daewoo - Dog Directs Blind Man; Heinz Baked Beans - Brother On Phone
Kids' Choice For Favourite TV Show	Home and Away, Seven Network	Friends, Nine Network; South Park, SBS TV; The Simpsons, Network Ten

=== 1999 ===
Category	Winner	Nominees
Australian of the Century	Victor Chang	Donald Bradman; Dawn Fraser; Fred Hollows
Australian of the Year	Ian Thorpe	Cathy Freeman; Pat Rafter; Dick Smith
Favourite Movie	Notting Hill	Austin Powers: The Spy Who Shagged Me; Saving Private Ryan; Star Wars: Episode I – The Phantom Menace
Favourite Movie Star (Male)	Mel Gibson	Sean Connery; Tom Hanks; Brad Pitt
Favourite Movie Star (Female)	Julia Roberts	Cate Blanchett; Nicole Kidman; Meg Ryan
Favourite Major Sporting Event on TV	Pan Pacific Swimming Championships, Nine Network	AFL Grand Final, Seven Network; NRL Grand Final, Nine Network; Australian Open Tennis, Seven Network
Favourite Sports Star (Male)	Pat Rafter - Tennis	Michael Doohan - Motorcycle sport Tony Lockett - Australian rules football Ian Thorpe - Swimming
Favourite Sports Star (Female)	Susie O'Neill - Swimming	Jelena Dokić - Tennis; Cathy Freeman - Athletics; Samantha Riley - Swimming
Favourite Band	Human Nature	Cold Chisel; INXS; Savage Garden
Favourite Singer (Male)	John Farnham	Jimmy Barnes; Lee Kernaghan; Anthony Warlow
Favourite Singer (Female)	Natalie Imbruglia	Kate Ceberano; Olivia Newton-John; Marina Prior
Favourite International TV Show	Friends, Nine Network	Ally McBeal, Seven Network; The Bill, ABC TV; ER, Nine Network
Favourite TV Drama or Serial	SeaChange, ABC TV	All Saints, Seven Network; Blue Heelers, Seven Network; Water Rats, Nine Network
Favourite Actor in a Drama or Serial	Martin Sacks, Blue Heelers, Seven Network	Colin Friels, Water Rats, Nine Network; William McInnes, Blue Heelers, Seven Network; John Wood, Blue Heelers, Seven Network
Favourite Actress in a Drama or Serial	Sigrid Thornton, SeaChange, ABC TV	Catherine McClements, Water Rats, Nine Network; Lisa McCune, Blue Heelers, Seven Network; Georgie Parker, All Saints, Seven Network
Favourite Comedy or Light Entertainment Show	Australia's Funniest Home Video Show, Nine Network	Good News Week, ABC TV and Network Ten; Hey Hey It's Saturday, Nine Network; The Panel, Network Ten
Favourite Comedy / Light Entertainment Star	Daryl Somers, Hey Hey It's Saturday, Nine Network	Paul McDermott, Good News Week, ABC TV and Network Ten; Glenn Robbins, The Panel, Network Ten; Paul Vautin, The NRL Footy Show, Nine Network
Favourite Current Affairs Show	A Current Affair, Nine Network	Foreign Correspondent, ABC TV; 60 Minutes, Nine Network; Today Tonight, Seven Network
Favourite Lifestyle or Infotainment Show	Better Homes And Gardens, Seven Network	Changing Rooms, Nine Network; Getaway, Nine Network; Harry's Practice, Seven Network
Favourite TV Presenter	Ernie Dingo, The Great Outdoors, Seven Network	Paul McDermott, Good News Week, ABC TV and Network Ten; Ray Martin, A Current Affair, Nine Network; Mike Munro, A Current Affair, Nine Network
Favourite TV Star	Sigrid Thornton, SeaChange, ABC TV	Colin Friels, Water Rats, Nine Network; Lisa McCune, Blue Heelers, Seven Network; Georgie Parker, All Saints, Seven Network
Favourite Teen Idol on TV	Brooke Satchwell, Neighbours, Network Ten	Sarah Michelle Gellar, Buffy the Vampire Slayer, Seven Network; Katie Holmes, Dawson's Creek, Network Ten; Jesse Spencer, Neighbours, Network Ten
Kids' Choice For Favourite TV Show	Home and Away, Seven Network	Dawson's Creek, Network Ten; Sabrina The Teenage Witch, Seven Network; The Simpsons, Network Ten

== See also ==
- List of television awards
- Other Australian awards termed People's Choice Awards:
  - Australian Country Music People's Choice Awards
  - Australian Traveller magazine People's Choice Awards
  - Dimmi People's Choice Awards (a crowdsourced ranking of restaurants)
  - National Landcare People's Choice Award
