= Undertow (2018 film) =

2018 Australian film

- Directed by: Miranda Nation
- Written by: Miranda Nation
- Produced by: Lyn Norfor
- Starring: Olivia DeJonge; Josh Helman; Laura Gordon; Rob Collins
- Cinematography: Bonnie Elliott
- Edited by: Julie-Anne De Ruvo; Nick Meyers
- Music by: Lisa Gerrard; James Orr; Raul Sanchez
- Release date: 2018 (Melbourne International Film Festival)
- Running time: 96 minutes
- Country: Australia
- Language: English

Undertow is a 2018 Australian psychological thriller film written and directed by Miranda Nation. The film premiered in August 2018 at the Melbourne International Film Festival, and in June 2019 at the Edinburgh International Film Festival. It was released in Australian cinemas in February 2020.

== Plot ==
Claire, who is grieving the loss of her baby, suspects her husband may be cheating.

== Cast ==
- Olivia DeJonge as Angie
- Josh Helman as Brett
- Laura Gordon as Claire
- Rob Collins as Dan

== Production ==
Undertow is Nation's first feature film. It was shot in Geelong in 2017. The production had a high proportion of female crew members.

Bonnie Elliott was responsible for cinematography.

== Awards ==
- 10th AACTA Awards
  - AACTA Award for Best Actress in a Leading Role - Laura Gordon - Nominated
  - AACTA Award for Best Editing - Julie-Anne De Ruvo and Nick Meyers - Nominated

== Reception ==
On the review aggregator website Rotten Tomatoes, 100% of 10 critics' reviews are positive, with an average rating of 6.8/10. Luke Buckmaster of The Guardian gave it four stars and called it "an intensely gripping female-led Australian drama". Sarah Ward of Screen Daily said "Making a moody, confident feature debut, actor turned writer/director Miranda Nation takes the drama of mourning and impending motherhood, and spins it into psychological thriller territory with an added dose of topicality." Vicky Roach of the Daily Telegraph gave it 3 stars, calling it "An impressive showcase for some extraordinary Australian talent." Writing in the Canberra Times, Jane Freebury gave it 3 stars, concluding "Undertow is in many ways an impressive achievement, and it augurs well for director Nation's next project." David Stratton gave it 3 stars in The Australian. He states "The plotting is convoluted and the motivations not always clear, but the film gets by on the strength of some solid performances and the attractive photography by Bonnie Elliott." The Sun Herald's Sandra Hall gave it 3 1/2 stars, finishing her review "It's an intelligent film, but it's relentless."
