= Gangs of Oz =

- Genre: Crime documentary
- Narrated by: Colin Friels
- Country of origin: Australia
- Original language: English
- No. of episodes: 12

Production
- Running time: 60 minutes (including commercials)

Original release
- Network: Seven Network
- Release: 11 February 2009 – 2010

Gangs of Oz is an Australian television documentary series on the Seven Network narrated by actor Colin Friels. The show looks at real stories of Australia's criminal underworld with accounts from criminals, their families and the police who risk their lives to catch them.

== Episodes ==
Season 1

- Episode 1 – Middle Eastern Gangs – The Power, The Passion, The Betrayal
- Episode 2 – The Aussie Mafia – Inside The Family
- Episode 3 – The Bikies – Inside The Band of Brothers
- Episode 4 – The Gangland Wars – The Tale of Three Gangs
- Episode 5 – Asian Gangs – Chasing The Dragon

Season 2

- Episode 1 – The Bikies – Taking Care of Business
- Episode 2 – The Bikies – For Love Or Money
- Episode 3 – Young Guns... Loose Canons
- Episode 4 – Armed and Dangerous
- Episode 5 – White Powder Wars
- Episode 6 – In From The Cold
- Episode 7 – Friends in High Places
