= List of 2004 box office number-one films in Australia =

This is a list of films which placed number-one at the box office in Australia during 2004. Amounts are in Australian dollars. Also included are the positions at the box office other films opened at. Quite a number of these are films from the previous year due to normal Australian film distribution delays.

== Number-one films ==
†	This implies the highest-grossing movie of the year.

#	Week ending	Film	Box office	Openings
1	7 January 2004	The Lord of the Rings: The Return of the King	$10,942,608	Spy Kids 3-D: Game Over (#2), Welcome to the Jungle (#4), Cold Mountain (#5)
2	14 January 2004	The Lord of the Rings: The Return of the King	$5,621,451	Something's Gotta Give (#2), Cheaper by the Dozen (#4), Honey (#6)
3	21 January 2004	The Last Samurai	$4,693,791	Veronica Guerin (#14), Step into Liquid (#20)
4	28 January 2004	Along Came Polly	$3,710,712	Underworld (#3), Torque (#7), 21 Grams (#11), In America (#19)
5	4 February 2004	Along Came Polly	$1,930,706	Out of Time (#6)
6	11 February 2004	Big Fish	$1,620,457	Jeepers Creepers 2 (#6), Timeline (#7)
7	18 February 2004	Stuck on You	$2,003,532	Under the Tuscan Sun (#2), Open Range (#13), House of Sand and Fog (#16)
8	25 February 2004	Mona Lisa Smile	$2,768,522	The Passion of the Christ preview (#7), One Perfect Day (#8), Dickie Roberts: Former Child Star (#11)
9	3 March 2004	The Passion of the Christ	$4,187,162	Once Upon a Time in Mexico (#2)
10	10 March 2004	The Passion of the Christ	$2,909,223	The Missing (#2), The Fighting Temptations (#9), The Human Stain (#16)
11	17 March 2004	The Passion of the Christ	$1,777,244	The Butterfly Effect (#2), Girl with a Pearl Earring (#7), House of 1000 Corpses (#10), The Big Bounce (#13), Plots with a View (#15), Thirteen (#19)
12	24 March 2004	The Butterfly Effect	$1,240,542	Paycheck (#3), Hidalgo (#4), Agent Cody Banks 2: Destination London (#6)
13	31 March 2004	50 First Dates	$3,836,663	The Haunted Mansion (#2), Monster (#4), Billabong Odyssey (#17), Capturing the Friedmans (#20)
14	7 April 2004	50 First Dates	$3,586,111	The Cat in the Hat (#2), Scooby-Doo 2: Monsters Unleashed (#3), Love's Brother (#10)
15	14 April 2004	Starsky & Hutch	$5,501,958	Secret Window (#5), Win a Date with Tad Hamilton! (#8), Confessions of a Teenage Drama Queen (#9), The Barbarian Invasions (#13), Tais-toi! (#16), Nathalie... (#20)
16	21 April 2004	Starsky & Hutch	$3,359,520	Taking Lives (#5), Eternal Sunshine of the Spotless Mind (#8)
17	28 April 2004	Kill Bill: Volume 2	$4,184,557	Strange Bedfellows (#3)
18	5 May 2004	Gothika	$2,127,588	The Dreamers (#19), To Be and to Have (#20)
19	12 May 2004	Van Helsing	$5,804,416	Evelyn (#9)
20	19 May 2004	Troy	$8,652,345	The Triplets of Belleville (#12), The Company (#16), Dirty Dancing: Havana Nights (#19)
21	26 May 2004	Troy	$5,469,578	Twisted (#3), Thunderstruck (#4), The Cooler (#10), Wondrous Oblivion (#11)
22	2 June 2004	The Day After Tomorrow	$8,481,515	Warren Miller's Journey (#14)
23	9 June 2004	The Day After Tomorrow	$4,653,338	Raising Helen (#3), The Punisher (#4), Super Size Me (#6), Intermission (#9), Twin Sisters (#18), Bon Voyage (#19)
24	16 June 2004	Harry Potter and the Prisoner of Azkaban	$16,108,989	Dawn of the Dead (#5), Dirty Pretty Things (#9)
25	23 June 2004	Shrek 2 †	$16,343,420	
26	30 June 2004	Shrek 2 †	$12,437,255	Mean Girls (#3), Spider-Man 2 (#4), The Prince and Me (#6), Touching the Void (#9), Club Dread (#18)
27	7 July 2004	Spider-Man 2	$10,508,747	New York Minute (#5), The Mother (#14), The Return (#15), Owning Mahowny (#18), Anatomy of Hell (#19)
28	14 July 2004	Spider-Man 2	$6,385,396	Godsend (#6), The Whole Ten Yards (#7), The Singing Detective (#19)
29	21 July 2004	King Arthur	$4,371,383	The Stepford Wives (#3), Spartan (#13), My Life Without Me (#19)
30	28 July 2004	I, Robot	$5,848,531	Laws of Attraction (#9)
31	4 August 2004	I, Robot	$3,220,723	Fahrenheit 9/11 (#2), The Chronicles of Riddick (#3), Under the Radar (#12)
32	11 August 2004	Man on Fire	$2,436,432	White Chicks (#2), Connie & Carla (#5), Against the Ropes (#15)
33	18 August 2004	Man on Fire	$1,483,836	Walking Tall (#2), Jersey Girl (#6), EuroTrip (#11), Donnie Darko: The Director's Cut (#15), I'm Not Scared (#18)
34	25 August 2004	Hellboy	$1,877,297	The Ladykillers (#4), Before Sunset (#11), The Crop (#13), Coffee and Cigarettes (#13), Tom White (#20)
35	1 September 2004	The Bourne Supremacy	$6,330,279	Around the World in 80 Days (#3), The Girl Next Door (#4), The Life and Death of Peter Sellers (#8)
36	8 September 2004	The Village	$3,877,730	Suddenly 30 (#3), The Corporation (#15), Zatoichi (#17)
37	15 September 2004	DodgeBall: A True Underdog Story	$3,011,903	The Terminal (#3)
38	22 September 2004	Garfield: The Movie	$3,189,662	Catwoman (#3), The Princess Diaries 2: Royal Engagement (#6), Thunderbirds (#9), Home on the Range (#10), Yu-Gi-Oh! The Movie (#11), Somersault (#12), Metallica: Some Kind of Monster (#14)
39	29 September 2004	Shark Tale	$5,083,548	A Cinderella Story (#5), Harold & Kumar Go to White Castle (#9), Spring, Summer, Fall, Winter... and Spring (#20)
40	6 October 2004	Shark Tale	$4,336,535	Alien vs. Predator (#2), Wimbledon (#3), You Got Served (#8), Vanity Fair (#14), The Weeping Camel (#20)
41	13 October 2004	Shark Tale	$2,179,930	Anacondas: The Hunt for the Blood Orchid (#3), Shaun of the Dead (#7)
42	20 October 2004	Collateral	$3,300,341	The Notebook (#2), Open Water (#3)
43	27 October 2004	Shall We Dance?	$2,977,095	Resident Evil: Apocalypse (#3), Anchorman: The Legend of Ron Burgundy (#5)
44	3 November 2004	Shall We Dance?	$2,398,622	The Manchurian Candidate (#2), Exorcist: The Beginning (#7), Saved! (#10), In My Father's Den (#14)
45	10 November 2004	Hero	$2,782,903	The Forgotten (#3), De-Lovely (#10), A Man's Gotta Do (#16)
46	17 November 2004	Bridget Jones: The Edge of Reason	$7,252,987	Taxi (#2), Veer-Zaara (#15), Napoleon Dynamite (#17), Paparazzi (#19), The Final Cut (#20)
47	24 November 2004	Bridget Jones: The Edge of Reason	$4,406,598	The Grudge (#2), The Polar Express (#3), Without a Paddle (#7)
48	1 December 2004	National Treasure	$2,658,761	Bad Santa (#4), Garden State (#6), Two Brothers (#12), Stage Beauty (#14), The Clearing (#16)
49	8 December 2004	Team America: World Police	$1,836,899	Saw (#4), Christmas with the Kranks (#5), Ella Enchanted (#9)
50	15 December 2004	Ocean's Twelve	$6,404,839	Deep Blue (#12), Wicker Park (#13)
51	22 December 2004	Lemony Snicket's A Series of Unfortunate Events	$3,490,552	The Motorcycle Diaries (#11), I Heart Huckabees (#13), Swades: We, the People (#16), Après vous... (#17)
52	29 December 2004	Meet the Fockers	$8,764,837	The Incredibles (#2), Blade: Trinity (#3), The Phantom of the Opera (#6), A Very Long Engagement (#13)

== See also ==
- List of Australian films – Australian films by year
- 2004 in film
