= Solo (2006 film) =

2006 film

- Film poster
- Directed by: Morgan O'Neill
- Written by: Morgan O'Neill
- Produced by: Sue Seeary
- Starring: Colin Friels
- Release date: 2006
- Country: Australia
- Language: English
- Budget: A$1 million
- Box office: A$124,613 (Australia)

Solo is a 2006 Australian film directed by Morgan O'Neill and starring Colin Friels.

== Plot ==
The film is set in modern-day (2005) Sydney, Australia. Barrett (Colin Friels) is a loner who works for a group of illegitimate businessman called "The Gentlemen" as a contractor, specializing in assassinations and disposing of bodies. But he has had enough and wants to retire to a quiet life of fishing in a coastal town far away. "The Gentlemen", (top man Arkan, his associates Louis and Nguyen and Barrett's "handler", boxing promoter Reno) have no wish to lose his services, but offer him his freedom if he will murder a university student who has been over-enthusiastically delving into their part in the Sydney crime scene, the subject of her thesis. Barrett, who has befriended her, instead fakes her murder and the two take off for distant parts. That evening, after a heavy drinking session during which he confesses to her of his criminal past, she kills him. She answers a phone call from Reno, who is surprised that she has killed Barrett, but as a murderer she now has no choice but to work for him.

== Cast ==
- Colin Friels as Jack Barrett, hit man
- Angie Milliken as Kate, his favorite prostitute
- Vince Colosimo as Philip Keeling, crooked Assistant Commissioner of Police
- Bojana Novakovic as Billie Finn, the relentless honours student
- Chris Haywood as Arkan, crime boss
- Tony Barry as Louis, subordinate of Arkan, a blackjack player
- Linal Haft as Reno, boxing promoter and Barrett's handler
- Anh Do as Nguyen, importer and black marketeer
- Toby Schmitz as Trent
- Kerry Walker as University Supervisor
- Brian Harrison as Havana, old jazz pianist

== Production ==
The film was made after Morgan O'Neill's script was voted winner for Project Greenlight in Australia.

== Sound track ==
The film featured a sound track of "cool" modern jazz, played by Martyn Love (piano), Michael Bartolomei (piano), Damian de Boos-Smith (guitar and keyboards), Dale Barlow (tenor saxophone, bass clarinet and flute), Phillip Slater (trumpet), Cameron Undy (acoustic bass guitar), Martin Highland (drums), Fiona Adie (vocal textures). Pieces "Cross on ya" and "Hunter" were written by King Brown and Damian de Boos-Smith and performed by King Brown. "The Phone Call" was written by Toby Roberts and performed by The Telltales.

A CD titled "Solo Original Australian Motion Picture Soundtrack By Martyn Love & Damian De Boos-Smith" containing much of the sound track was released.
