= Giovanni Proietti =

Italian footballer

Personal information
- Date of birth: 27 June 1977 (age 49)
- Place of birth: Rome, Italy
- Height: 1.81 m (5 ft 11 1/2 in)
- Position: Goalkeeper

Senior career*
Years	Team	Apps	(Gls)
–1999	Lucchese	10	(0)
1999–2000	Lodigiani	12	(0)
2000–2002	Perugia	0	(0)
2001	→ Catania (loan)	1	(0)
2002–2005	Arezzo	23	(0)
2005–2006	Viterbese	9	(0)
2006	Gela	4	(0)
2006–2009	Lugano	66	(0)
2010–2011	Buochs	6	(0)
2011–2013	Wohlen	45	(0)
2013–2015	YF Juventus	2	(0)
2015–2016	Kosova	22	(0)
2016	Giulianova	9	(0)
2017	Spoltore		
2018–2019	Kosova	23	(0)
- * Club domestic league appearances and goals

Giovanni Proietti (born 26 June 1977) is an Italian former football goalkeeper.

He previously played for Lucchese in Serie B, for Lodigiani and Catania in Serie C1, for Arezzo in Serie B, for Viterbese and Gela in Serie C2, for Lugano and Wohlen in the Swiss Challenge League and for Buochs in the Swiss lower divisions.
