= The Commons (TV series) =

2019 Australian television program

- Genre: Drama; Dystopia
- Created by: Shelley Birse
- Written by: Shelley Birse; Matt Ford; Michael Miller; Matt Cameron
- Directed by: Jeffrey Walker; Rowan Woods; Jennifer Leacey
- Composer: Roger Mason
- Country of origin: Australia
- Original language: English

Production
- Executive producers: Shelley Birse; Graham Yost; Fred Golan; Michael Dinner; David Maher; David Taylor
- Producer: Diane Haddon
- Cinematography: Earle Dresner
- Running time: 50mins
- Production company: Playmaker Media

Original release
- Network: Stan
- Release: 25 December 2019

The Commons is a 2019 Australian television drama series on Stan about climate change and biotechnology set in the future. The eight-part, character-driven thriller looks at ethical boundaries and the place of humanity in saving the planet.

== Premise ==
Eadie, a radical and gifted neuropsychologist, is desperate for a child. In that quest, she faces intellectual property theft, disaster capitalism and eugenics.

== Cast ==
- Joanne Froggatt as Eadie Boulay
- David Lyons as Lloyd
- Ryan Corr as Shay
- Rupert Penry-Jones
- Damon Herriman as Ben Childers
- John Waters as Herman
- Fayssal Bazzi as Abel
- Simone McAullay as Francesca Boulay
- Andrea Demetriades as Karina
- Felix Williamson as Carl Anderson
- Sara West as Zoe
- Anthony Brandon Wong as Harlow
- Carma Sharon as Nurse Mumford
- Susan Prior as Mayor Lena Gordon
- Fletcher Humphrys as Angry Driver

== Episodes ==
No.	Title	Directed by	Written by	Original release date
1	"Episode 1"	Jeffrey Walker	Shelley Birse	25 December 2019
2	"Episode 2"	Jeffrey Walker	Shelley Birse	25 December 2019
3	"Episode 3"	Rowan Woods	Shelley Birse	25 December 2019
4	"Episode 4"	Rowan Woods	Matt Ford	25 December 2019
5	"Episode 5"	Jennifer Leacey	Michael Miller	25 December 2019
6	"Episode 6"	Jennifer Leacey	Matt Cameron	25 December 2019
7	"Episode 7"	Jeffrey Walker	Michael Miller	25 December 2019
8	"Episode 8"	Jeffrey Walker	Shelley Birse	25 December 2019

== Production ==
The Commons was written by Shelley Birse with Matt Ford, Michael Miller and Matt Cameron. It is produced by Diane Haddon for Playmaker in association with Sony Pictures Television. Jeffrey Walker is the director with Rowan Woods and Jen Leacey.

The series aired on Sundance Now in the United States in 2020.

== Awards ==
Birse won the 2020 John Hinde Award for Excellence in Science-Fiction Writing at the AWGIE Awards for The Commons.
