= Alkinos Tsilimidos =

Australian film and theatre director (born 1966)

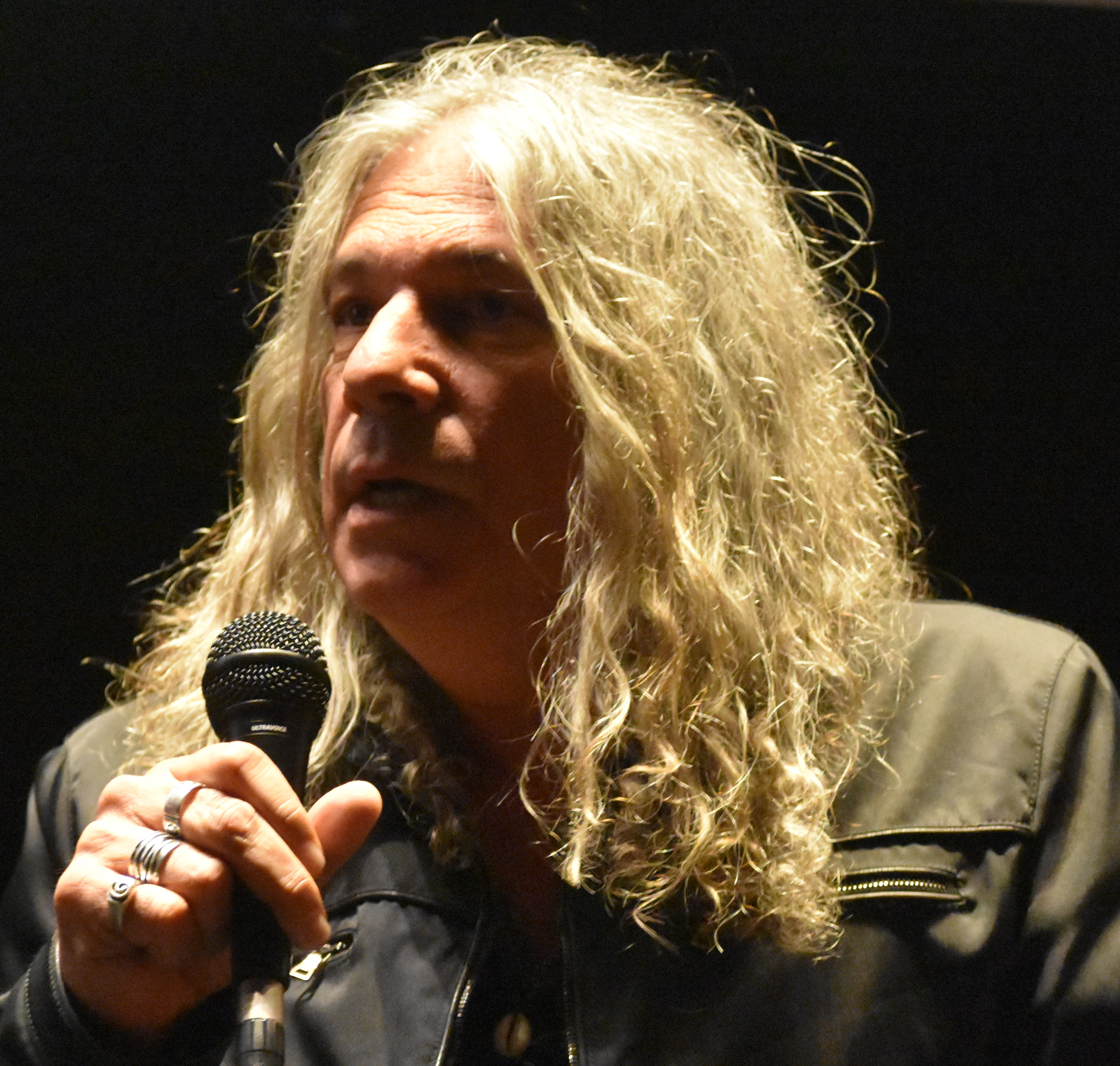
- Tsilimidos in 2025
- Born: 1966 (age 59–60); Melbourne, Victoria, Australia
- Occupation: Film director
- Years active: 1994–present

Alkinos Tsilimidos (born 1966) is an Australian film and theatre director. He has won the Montréal First Film Prize at the Montréal World Film Festival for his 1994 film Everynight ... Everynight. He primarily works as an indie film maker and has achieved many international festival awards.

Tsilimidos was born in Melbourne and raised in a middle-class family in Doncaster, Victoria. He is of Greek descent.

== Filmography ==
- Everynight ... Everynight (1994)
- Silent Partner (2001)
- Tom White (2004)
- Em 4 Jay (2006)
- Blind Company (2009)
- The Taverna (2019)

== Stage productions ==
- Red (2012)
- The Mountaintop (2013)
- Glengarry Glen Ross (2014)
