= Naomi Davis =

American author, blogger, influencer (born 1986)

Naomi Davis (born 1986) is an American author, blogger, and social media influencer. Davis was named a Forbes Top 10 Parenting Influencer and received "Best Family Blog" at the 2016 Bloglovin' Awards. Her book, an essay collection and memoir titled A Coat of Yellow Paint: Moving Through the Noise to Love the Life You Live, was released in April 2021. Davis is best known for writing about her life and family on her blog Love Taza, which is now defunct.

== Personal life ==
Davis earned a BFA from the Juilliard School, where she studied dance. In 2007, she married Josh Davis and started her blog to share about newlywed life with her family and friends. The Davises have five children together.

== Controversy ==
During the early days of the COVID-19 pandemic, Davis received widespread critique after sharing that her family left New York City, a coronavirus hotspot. Health experts warned that Davis might inadvertently encourage others to ignore public health guidelines and carry the virus across state lines.
