= Em 4 Jay =

2006 film by Alkinos Tsilimidos

- DVD cover
- Directed by: Alkinos Tsilimidos
- Written by: Daniel Keene; Alkinos Tsilimidos
- Produced by: Alkinos Tsilimidos; Paul Walton
- Starring: Laura Gordon; Nick Barkla
- Release dates: 5 August 2006 (Melbourne International Film Festival); 14 September 2006 (Australia)
- Running time: 87 minutes
- Country: Australia
- Language: English

Em 4 Jay is a 2006 Australian drama film directed by Alkinos Tsilimidos. Starring Laura Gordon and Nick Barkla, the story follows the lives of two heroin addicts living in Melbourne's inner suburbs. Em 4 Jay premiered at the Melbourne International Film Festival on 5 August 2006.

== Cast ==
- Nick Barkla as Jay
- David Campbell as Mick
- Laura Gordon as Em
- Jeremy Lindsay Taylor as Dealer
- Hamish Michael as Steve
- Kat Stewart as Janey
- Chloe Armstrong as Bianca
- Jonathan auf der Heide as Shopkeeper

== Reception ==
The Age's Jim Schembri gave it two stars. He concludes "Em 4 Jay is a film made with conviction by all those involved, but the cast and crew never overcome a narrative that is dirge-like in its nihilistic predictability." Leigh Paatsch of The Herald Sun gave it two and a half stars, saying "All in all, Em 4 Jay scraps it out for a dishonourable draw between daring us not to care and damning us for doing exactly that." George Palathingal of The Sydney Morning Herald gave it three and a half stars, saying: "Em 4 Jay doesn't give you a chance to get bored. It's not the future of Australian cinema or anything like that, but it leaves you both impressed and satisfied." Variety's Russell Edwards gave it a positive review, writing "authenticity makes Em 4 Jay a Down Under low-budget triumph."

== See also ==
- List of Australian films
