= Laura Gordon =

Australian actress (born 1981 / 1982)

- Born: 1981 or 1982 (age 44–45)
- Education: Narrabundah College, Canberra
- Occupation: Actor
- Years active: 2002–present
- Notable work: Em 4 Jay; Secret City; Late Night with the Devil; Hotel Cocaine
- Spouse: Nick Barkla

Laura Gordon (born 1981 or 1982) is an Australian actress.

== Early life ==
Gordon was raised in Canberra, Australia. She caught the acting bug when her father took her to see an amateur production as a young child. She attended Narrabundah College, which had a drama program, laying the foundation for her future acting career.

== Career ==
Gordon's major roles include Australian drama films Em 4 Jay (2006) and Face to Face (2011), and U.S./Australian horror Late Night with the Devil. Her television appearances include Winners & Losers, Hunters and Secret City: Under the Eagle. Most recently she has played a lead role in U.S. Amazon/MGM+ crime thriller series Hotel Cocaine, as Janice Nichols, the manager of the Mutiny Girls at the nightclub.

Gordon was nominated for the 2020 AACTA Award for Best Actress in a Leading Role for her role in Undertow (2018).

Gordon was a founding member of the Red Stitch Actors Theatre, an actors' co-operative. for which she has appeared in several stage productions.

On 17 February 2025, Gordon was named in the Stan series Watching You. On 5 March 2025, Gordon was named a nominee for Best Actress in Late Night with the Devil for the Australian Film Critics Association Awards.

== Personal life ==
Gordon is married to fellow actor Nick Barkla, with whom she starred in Em 4 Jay, Embedded and Hotel Cocaine.

== Filmography ==
Key
†	Denotes films that have not yet been released

=== Film ===
Year	Title	Role	Notes
2004	Tom White	Secretary	
2006	Em 4 Jay	Em	
2006	Five Moments of Infidelity	The Other Woman	
2007	Piranha	Katie	Short film
2008	Saw V	Ashley	
2009	Apricot	Madeline	Short film
2010	2 PM		Short film
2011	Face to Face	Julie Rossiter	
2012	Road to Recovery	Robin	Short film
2013	All I Want for Christmas	Ella	
2014	Alien Strain	Rachel	
2014	Come Back to Me	Leslie	
2015	Problem Play	Cass	Short film
2015	Unbelief	Lauren	Short film
2016	Joe Cinque's Consolation	Tanya	
2016	Embedded	Madeline	
2018	Undertow	Claire	
2021	Streamline	Kim Lane	
2023	Foe	OuterMore Customer	
2023	Hafekasi	Mum	Short film
2023	Late Night with the Devil	Dr. June Ross-Mitchell	
2026	Insidious: Out of the Further	Ingrid Hall	Post-production
2027	Voltron †		Post-production

=== Television ===
Year	Title	Role	Notes	Ref
2002	Blue Heelers	Briony	1 episode	
2004	Scooter: Secret Agent	Young Woman	1 episode	
2004	Neighbours	Buffy	1 episode	
2008	Legend of the Seeker	Lilly	1 episode	
2008	Underbelly	Ella	1 episode	
2009	City Homicide	Andrea	1 episode	
2011	Bed of Roses	Donna	1 episode	
2011–2013	Twentysomething	Anita	Recurring role	
2012	Lowdown	Claire Day	1 episode	
2012	Rizzoli & Isles	Victoria Green	1 episode	
2013	Major Crimes	Ashley Elliot	1 episode	
2014–2015	Winners & Losers	Izzy Hughes	Main cast (series 4)	
2015	Miss Fisher's Murder Mysteries	Jemima	1 episode	
2016	Hunters	Abby Carroll	Main cast	
2017	Hoges: The Paul Hogan Story	Linda Kozlowski	Miniseries, 2 episodes	
2018	Harrow	Audrey	1 episode	
2019	Reef Break	Sergeant Kirsty Ellis	Recurring role	
2019	Secret City: Under the Eagle	Caroline 'Cal' Treloar	Main cast (series 2)	
2019–2020	Reckoning	Candace Doyle	Main cast	
2020	AussieWood	Danielle		
2020	Halifax: Retribution	Toni	1 episode	
2023	The Claremont Murders	Det. Bobbi McAllister	Miniseries, main cast	
2024	Hotel Cocaine	Janice Nichols	Main cast	
2025	Watching You	Clare	Main cast	
2026	Wentworth: Halfway Home	TBA	TV series	

=== Podcast ===
Year	Title	Role	Notes	Ref
2019	The ShowBiz Podcast with Robert Rabiah and Joey Coley-Sowry		Podcast	

== Theatre ==
Year	Title	Role	Notes
2002	Dawn / Day / Dusk		Red Stitch Actors Theatre, Melbourne
2002	The Play About the Baby		Red Stitch Actors Theatre, Melbourne
2003	The House of Bernarda Alba		Red Stitch Actors Theatre, Melbourne
2003	Black Milk		Red Stitch Actors Theatre, Melbourne; Nominated for a Green Room Award
2003	Red Shorts		Red Stitch Actors Theatre, Melbourne
2004	Some Voices		Red Stitch Actors Theatre, Melbourne
2004	Year of the Family		Red Stitch Actors Theatre, Melbourne
2005	The Country		Red Stitch Actors Theatre, Melbourne
	By the Sea, By the Sea, By the Beautiful Sea		Red Stitch Actors Theatre, Melbourne
	The Lights		Red Stitch Actors Theatre, Melbourne
2011	Apologia		Fairfax Studio, Melbourne, with Melbourne Theatre Company
2011	Clybourne Park		Southbank Theatre, Melbourne, with Melbourne Theatre Company
	The Gift		Melbourne Theatre Company
	A Midsummer Night’s Dream		Australia Shakespeare Company
	Romeo and Juliet	Juliet	Neolith Productions

== Awards ==
Year	Title	Award	Category	Result
2003	Black Milk	Green Room Awards		Nominated
2011	Face to Face	Inside Film Awards	Best Actress	Nominated
2012	Twentysomething	Equity Ensemble Awards	Outstanding Performance by an Ensemble in a Comedy Series	Nominated
2020	Undertow	AACTA Awards	Best Lead Actress in a Film	Nominated
2025	Late Night with the Devil	AACTA Awards	Best Lead Actress in a Film	Nominated
2025	Late Night with the Devil	Australian Film Critics Association Awards	Best Actress	Nominated
