= Shannon Murphy =

Australian film and television director

Director Shannon Murphy

Shannon Murphy is an Australian film and television director. She made her feature film debut with Babyteeth (2019), for which she was nominated for the BAFTA Award for Best Direction in 2021.

== Early life and education ==
Murphy was raised in Hong Kong. In 2013, she received a graduate diploma in directing from the Australian Film, Television and Radio School.

== Career ==
Murphy's graduating short film, Kharisma (2014), was screened at Cannes Film Festival. Her short film Eaglehawk (2016) was selected for the Dendy Awards at the Sydney Film Festival in 2016.

Murphy's debut feature film, Babyteeth (2019), stars Eliza Scanlen as a terminally ill teen. It was nominated for best film at the 2019 Venice Film Festival. It earned positive reviews in Rolling Stone, Vanity Fair, and Variety.

Murphy directed episodes five and six of the third season of Killing Eve, which premiered in 2020.

Variety listed her as one of the "10 directors to watch" in 2020.

== Filmography ==
- Being Brendo (2012, TV series)
- The Comeback (2013, short)
- Love Me Tender (2014, short)
- Kharisma (2014, short)
- Pineapple Squat (2015, short)
- Eaglehawk (2016, short)
- Love Child (2017, TV series)
- Offspring (2016/2017, TV series)
- Sisters (2017, TV series)
- Rake (2018, TV series)
- On the Ropes (2018, TV series)
- Babyteeth (2019, film)
- Killing Eve (2020, TV series)
- Dave (2023, TV series)
- The Power (2023, TV series)
- Dope Girls (2025, TV series)
- Dying for Sex (2025, TV series)
- The Age of Innocence (2027, TV series)
