= Colin Friels =

Australian actor (born 1952)

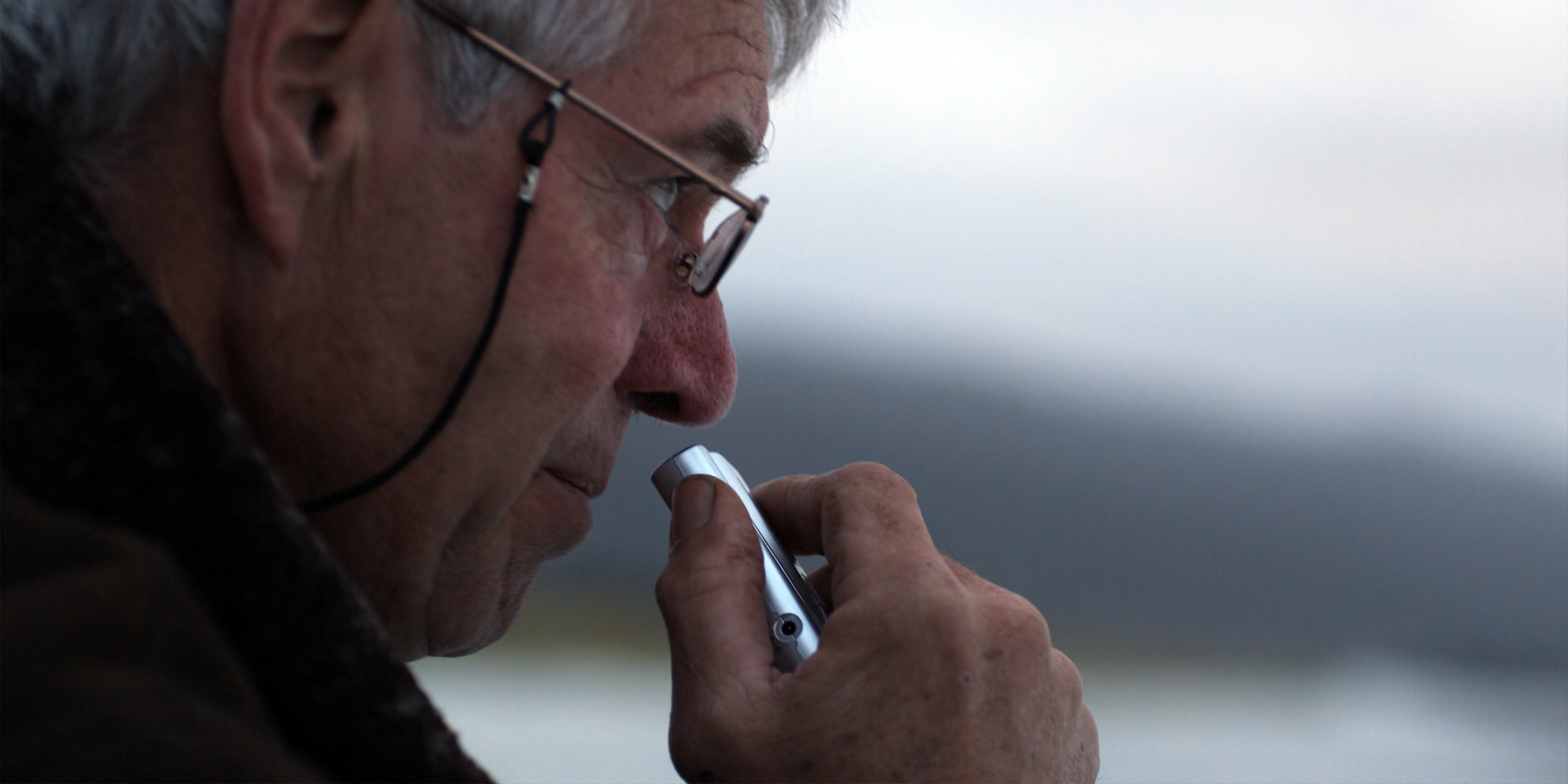
- Friels in 2009
- Born: 25 September 1952 (age 74); Kilwinning, Ayrshire, Scotland
- Education: National Institute of Dramatic Art (BFA)
- Occupation: Actor
- Years active: 1976–present
- Known for: Malcolm (1986); Water Rats (1996–1999)
- Spouse: Judy Davis (m. 1984)
- Children: 2

Colin Friels (born 25 September 1952) is an Australian actor of stage, film and television.

== Early life ==
Colin Friels was born on 25 September 1952 in Kilwinning, Ayrshire, Scotland. His mother was a mill worker and French polisher, and his father a carpenter. He lived in Kilbirnie until 1963, when his family moved to Australia, arriving in Darwin, Northern Territory before settling in the Melbourne suburb of Bentleigh. He worked as a bricklayer's labourer before studying at the National Institute of Dramatic Art (NIDA), graduating in 1976.

== Career ==
After graduating from NIDA, Friels' career began in theatre, predominantly in productions for the State Theatre Company of South Australia, before going on to perform with Nimrod Theatre Company and Sydney Theatre Company from 1980.

In 1980, he also began working as a presenter on the Australian version of children's series Play School. His first feature film role was in the unreleased Prisoners (1981), appearing with David Hemmings and Tatum O'Neal. His first appearance in a released feature film was in Hoodwink (1981), alongside his future wife, Judy Davis. He also featured in Monkey Grip opposite Noni Hazlehurst in 1982.

In 1983, Friels appeared in drama miniseries For the Term of His Natural Life, opposite Anthony Perkins and Diane Cilento, and co-starred in comedy film Buddies with Harold Hopkins. He then played the pivotal role of one of two brothers competing to win an Ironman Triathlon in The Coolangatta Gold (also known as The Gold and the Glory) in 1984. While the film was not a box office success, it led to the establishment of the ongoing real life Ironman race of the same name, after the producers decided to run the race as an actual competition (won that first year by Guy Leech).

Friels next played the title role in 1986 comedy film Malcolm, about a shy mechanical genius, for which he was awarded the AFI Award for Best Actor. That same year, he co-starred with wife Judy Davis in drama film Kangaroo. In 1987, he was nominated again for the Best Actor award, this time for his role as Harvey Denton in Ground Zero, but did not win. The film received mixed reviews, with one describing him as "a proficient enough actor, but...miscast". A role in crime film Grievous Bodily Harm followed in 1988, in which he starred with John Waters.

In 1990, Friels appeared as a megalomaniac corporate executive in American superhero film Darkman, alongside Liam Neeson and Frances McDormand and had a lead role in comedy film Weekend with Kate. The following year, he was nominated for the AFI Award for Best Actor, for his performance as the title character in 1991 film Dingo, but lost to Hugo Weaving for his role in Proof. He also appeared in legal thriller Class Action with Gene Hackman and Laurence Fishburne.

In 1993, Friels starred as Australian billionaire Sly Morgan in comedy sci-fi miniseries Stark, opposite Ben Elton. The following year, he landed the role of womanising British diplomat Morgan Leafy in comedy film A Good Man in Africa, alongside Sean Connery and had a starring role in the Halifax f.p. telemovie Hard Corps, The latter earned him another AFI Award in 1995. He then played a psychopath, opposite Paul Mercurio in the thriller Back of Beyond and appeared in drama film Angel Baby with John Lynch and Jacqueline McKenzie. before reuniting with McKenzie the following year in Mr. Reliable, the true story of petty criminal Wally Mellish, who conducted an eight day siege together with his girlfriend.

From 1996 to 1999, Friels began his first long-term television role, playing the lead character of Frank Holloway in crime drama series Water Rats, a role which won him the Logie Award for Most Outstanding Actor at the 1997 awards. He was nominated again for the same award in 2000. During this time, Friels also played the role of Walenski in 1998 sci-fi fantasy film Dark City, starring Kiefer Sutherland and Jennifer Connelly. In 1999, he also took on the title role in a Sydney Theatre Company production of Macbeth.

Friels landed the role of David Myers in 2001 comedy film The Man Who Sued God, in which he starred alongside comedian Billy Connolly and wife Judy Davis. He played George Temple in American Disney TV movie Child Star: The Shirley Temple Story and the lead role of Bob Inkster in crime drama TV movie My Husband, My Killer. He also co-starred with Greta Scacchi as Tom Cooper in drama miniseries The Farm. The following year saw Friels play Father Tom Dixon, opposite Robert Carlyle, Charles Dance and Ben Mendelsohn in 2002 court drama film Black and White. His 2002 portrayal of Heisenberg in a Sydney Theatre Company production of Copenhagen saw him win both a Mo Award and a Helpmann Award for Best Male Actor.

From 2003, Friels began appearing as the main character of Sydney detective Jack Kempson in the BlackJack series of telemovies. The following year he took on the title role in drama film Tom White, about an architect who experiences a mental breakdown. His performance saw him nominated for the AFI Award for Best Actor in a Leading Role, losing out to Sam Worthington for Somersault. He also appeared opposite Michael Weatherly as Nick Gurdin in 2004 American docudrama miniseries The Mystery of Natalie Wood.

In 2005, Friels played Ray Gill, opposite Samuel Johnson in dark comedy film The Illustrated Family Doctor. The following year, he played the lead role of Sydney stand-over man Jack Barrett in feature film Solo. He also had a role in 2006 suspense drama film The Book of Revelation.

Friels appeared with William McInnes and Stephen Curry, playing Doug Lamont in 2008 film The Informant. He then played the lead role of Geoff Brewster in drama thriller film Blind Company in 2009. The following year, Friels starred in Killing Time, where he portrayed notorious real world underworld figure Lewis Moran, opposite David Wenham. He also had a role in drama film Matching Jack, alongside James Nesbitt, Jacinda Barrett, Richard Roxburgh and Yvonne Strahovski, and appeared as Dr Clements in sci-fi drama film Tomorrow, When the War Began, based on the 1993 John Marsden novel of the same name.

In 2011, Friels featured opposite Charlotte Rampling, Geoffrey Rush and wife Judy Davis in drama film The Eye of the Storm, and appeared with Deborah Mailman in 2012 TV docudrama Mabo, documenting the story of Torres Strait Islander land rights activist Eddie Mabo.

Friels then began a run of theatre appearances, including playing the lead role of Willy Loman in Death of a Salesman in 2012. His performance as Loman earned him the 2013 Helpmann Award for Best Male Actor in a Play. Friels narrated the "Ash Wednesday" segment of 2013 anthology film The Turning, and the following year, he portrayed Mick Corby in TV film Schapelle, based on the story of convicted drug smuggler Schapelle Corby. In 2015, he then voiced the character of Terry the Tug in ABC4Kids animated series Sydney Sailboat.

Friels had a recurring role opposite Jessica Mauboy in feel-good drama series The Secret Daughter in 2016, playing Jack Norton. In 2018, he played Tony Ballantyne in the first season of mystery drama series Mystery Road, again opposite Judy Davis (as cop, Emma James) and Aaron Pedersen.

In 2021, Friels appeared as Jack Ramsay in the second season of the ABC series Total Control, a Coalition MP facing off against independent candidate Alex Irving (Deborah Mailman). He also appeared in a 2021 episode of Wakefield, his performance earning him the 2022 Logie Award for Most Outstanding Supporting Actor. He then had a role in 2022 action adventure film Interceptor, playing Frank Collins, alongside Luke Bracey and Elsa Pataky. That same year, he appeared in Vanishing Act, an installment of the Underbelly crime drama franchise.

More recently, Friels was seen playing the role of Gareth Reid in 2026 Amazon Prime suspense miniseries Last Seen, with Patrick Brammall and Brendan Cowell.

== Personal life ==
Friels has been married to actress Judy Davis since 1984; the couple has two children. Their relationship was briefly in the media when Judy Davis was granted a domestic violence court order against Friels, however, they remained together.

Friels' daughter Charlotte is an actor, and featured alongside him in a Belvoir production of King Lear, as Goneril, Lear’s eldest daughter. His niece Elizabeth Friels is also an actor, having appeared in the television drama series Stingers and All Saints.

In late 1997, Friels was diagnosed with pancreatic cancer. However, his treatment was successful, and he is one of the very few sufferers of this disease to go into long-term remission. During his treatment, he continued to work on the set of Water Rats, until eventually the impact of the chemotherapy stopped him working, and he chose to have his character written out of the series by sending him on a sailing journey around the world. At this time, however, he also continued his stage work, and was performing in Sydney Theatre Company's Macbeth.

=== Political views ===
Friels believes that social and political awareness comes with acting, and is known for his engagement in policy debates, including industrial issues such as workplace relations and free trade. He publicly criticised Bush administration policy in the Middle East, and supported the Sydney Peace Foundation. His engagement with social issues has been evident in his acting work, with two prominent examples being his lead role in Ground Zero, in which he played a cameraman investigating British nuclear testing in South Australia, and his appearance in the ABC television drama Bastard Boys, in which he played union official John Coombs.

== Filmography ==
=== Film ===
Year	Title	Role	Type	Ref
1979	The Cavity Caper		Short film	
1981	Hoodwink	Robert	Feature film	
1982	Prisoners	Nick	Feature film	
1982	Monkey Grip	Javo	Feature film	
1983	Buddies	Mike	Feature film	
1983	Distinguished Guests	Christopher	Short film	
1984	The Coolangatta Gold (aka The Gold & the Glory	Adam Lucas	Feature film	
1986	Kangaroo	Richard Somers	Feature film	
1986	Malcolm	Malcolm Hughes	Feature film	
1987	Ground Zero	Harvey Denton	Feature film	
1988	Warm Nights on a Slow Moving Train	The Man	Feature film	
1988	Grievous Bodily Harm	Tom Stewart	Feature film	
1988	High Tide	Mick	Feature film	
1990	Darkman	Louis Strack Jr	Feature film	
1990	Weekend with Kate	Richard Muir	Feature film	
1991	Class Action	Michael Grazier	Feature film	
1992	Dingo	John 'Dingo' Anderson	Feature film	
1993	The Nostradamus Kid	American Preacher	Feature film	
1994	A Good Man in Africa	Morgan Leafy	Feature film	
1995	Angel Baby	Morris	Feature film	
1995	Back of Beyond	Connor	Feature film	
1996	Cosi	Errol Grier	Feature film	
1996	Mr. Reliable (aka My Entire Life)	Wally Mellish	Feature film	
1998	Dark City	Eddie Walenski	Feature film	
2001	The Man Who Sued God	David Myers	Feature film	
2002	Black and White	Father Tom Dixon	Feature film	
2003	Max's Dreaming (aka Deeper than Blue)	Mark Bryce	Feature film	
2004	Tom White	Tom White	Feature film	
2005	The Illustrated Family Doctor	Ray Gill	Feature film	
2006	Solo	Jack Barrett	Feature film	
2006	The Book of Revelation	Olsen	Feature film	
2009	Blind Company	Geoff Brewster	Feature film	
2010	Lest We Forget	Sam	Short film	
2010	Matching Jack	Professor Nelson	Feature film	
2010	The Nothing Men	Jack Simpson	Feature film	
2010	Tomorrow, When The War Began	Dr Clements	Feature film	
2011	A Heartbeat Away	Mayor Riddick	Feature film	
2011	The Eye of the Storm	Athol Shreve	Feature film	
2013	The Turning	Narrator	Anthology feature film (segment: "Ash Wednesday")	
2015	Sweat	Ramon, the farmer	Short film	
2016	The Crossing	Sea Captain (voice)	Animated short film	
2017	Snared		Short film	
2022	Fences	Father	Short film	
2022	Interceptor	Frank Collins	Feature film	

=== Television ===
Year	Title	Role	Type	Ref
1980	Big Toys		TV movie	
1980–1981	Play School	Presenter		
1983	For the Term of His Natural Life	Rufus Dawes / Richard Devine	Miniseries, 3 episodes	
1985	The Man in the Iron Mask	Phillipe (voice)	Animated TV movie	
1992	Police Rescue	Lew Campbell	Season 2, episode 9: "Reasons to Live"	
1992	Last Man Hanged	Ronald Ryan	TV movie	
1993	Seven Deadly Sins	Roger Pascoe	Miniseries, 1 episode: "Pride"	
1993	Stark	Sly Morgan	Miniseries, 3 episodes	
1993	The Burning Piano: A Portrait of Patrick White		TV movie	
1995	Halifax f.p.	Kevin Tait	Season 1, episode 5: "Hard Corps"	
1995	Space: Above and Beyond	Lt. Colonel Fouts	Pilot episode	
1996–1999	Water Rats	Frank Holloway	109 episodes	
2000	Marriage Acts	David McKinnon	TV movie	
2001	My Husband, My Killer	Bob Inkster	TV movie	
2001	Child Star: The Shirley Temple Story	George Temple	TV movie	
2001	The Farm	Tom Cooper	Miniseries, 3 episodes	
2003	Temptation	Roberto Francobelli	TV movie pilot for The Cooks	
2003	BlackJack	Jack Kempson	TV movie	
2004	BlackJack: Sweet Science	Jack Kempson	TV movie	
2004	The Mystery of Natalie Wood	Nick Gurdin	Miniseries, episode 1	
2005	BlackJack: Ace Point Game	Jack Kempson	TV movie	
2006	Bom Bali	Narrator	TV documentary film	
2006	BlackJack: At the Gates	Jack Kempson	TV movie	
2006	BlackJack: Dead Memory	Jack Kempson	TV movie	
2006	Life at 1	Narrator	Documentary miniseries, 2 episodes	
2007	Bastard Boys	John Coombs	Miniseries, 1 episode	
2007	Air Australia	Narrator	Miniseries	
2007	Blackjack: Ghosts	Jack Kempson	TV movie	
2008	The Informant	Doug Lamont	TV movie	
2008	Australia: Land of Parrots	Narrator	TV documentary film	
2009	Gangs of Oz	Narrator	Documentary series	
2010	Killing Time	Lewis Moran	Miniseries, 8 episodes	
2011	Ned's Head	Narrator	TV documentary film	
2011	The Man Who Jumped	Narrator	TV documentary film	
2011	Wild Boys	Mad Dog Morgan	Episode 11	
2012	Mabo	Justice Moynihan	TV docudrama film	
2012	Jack Irish: Bad Debts	Garth Bruce	TV movie	
2013	Schapelle	Mick Corby	TV movie	
2015	Sydney Sailboat (aka Bubble Bath Bay)	Terry the Tug (voice)	Animated series, 52 episodes	
2015	Go Back to Where You Came From	Narrator	Documentary series, 3 episodes	
2016	Changed Forever: The Making of Australia	Narrator	Miniseries, episode 2: "ANZACS"	
2016	DNA Nation	Narrator	Documentary series, 3 episodes	
2016	The Secret Daughter	Jack Norton	6 episodes	
2016	First Contact	Narrator	Documentary series, 3 episodes	
2017–2020	Filthy Rich and Homeless	Narrator	Documentary series	
2018	Mystery Road	Tony Ballantyne	Season 1, 6 episodes	
2021	Wakefield	Baz Madden	Miniseries, episode 7	
2021	Total Control	Jack Ramsay MP	Season 2, 6 episodes	
2022	Pieces of Her	Eli	Episode 6	
2022	Underbelly: Vanishing Act	George K	Miniseries, 3 episodes	
2026	Last Seen	Gareth Reid	2 episodes	

== Theatre ==
Year	Title	Role	Theatre Co	Ref
1975	Rio Rita		NIDA with Old Tote Theatre Co	
1975	Three Sisters	Soliony	NIDA Theatre, Sydney	
1976	A Midsummer Night's Dream		Newcastle, NIDA Theatre, Sydney	
1976	Miss Hook of Holland	Joost de Coop	NIDA Theatre, Sydney	
1977	The School for Scandal	Sir Harry Bumper	Playhouse, Adelaide with STCSA	
1977	The Cherry Orchard		Playhouse, Adelaide with STCSA	
1977	Fall Out Follies		STCSA	
1977	Family Lore	James Singer	Playhouse, Adelaide with STCSA	
1977	Swansong for Antlers	Damien Anderson	Theatre 62, Adelaide with STCSA	
1977	The Right Man	Policeman / Interjector	Theatre 62, Adelaide with STCSA	
1977	Annie Get Your Gun	Tommy	Playhouse, Adelaide with STCSA	
1977	Macbeth	Macduff	Playhouse, Adelaide with STCSA	
1977	They Shoot Horses, Don't They?		Space Theatre, Adelaide with STCSA	
1978	Oedipus the King / Oedipus at Colonus	Chorus of Theban & Athenian Elders	Playhouse, Adelaide with STCSA	
1978	Ah Romance!		Playhouse, Adelaide with STCSA	
1978	Cedoona	Garrie	Space Theatre, Adelaide with STCSA	
1978	Henry IV, Part 1 & Henry IV, Part 2	Poins	Playhouse, Adelaide with STCSA	
1978	The Les Darcy Show	Les Darcy	Space Theatre, Adelaide with STCSA	
1978	Peer Gynt	Cowgirl / Eunuch	Playhouse, Adelaide with STCSA & Magpie Theatre Co	
1978	Cymbeline	Cloten	Playhouse, Adelaide with STCSA	
1978; 1979	A Manual of Trench Warfare	Barry Moon	Playhouse, Adelaide with STCSA / Seymour Centre, Sydney	
1978; 1979	Summer of the Seventeenth Doll	Johnnie Dowd	Playhouse, Adelaide with STCSA	
1979	Hamlet	Laertes	Playhouse, Adelaide with STCSA	
1979	American Buffalo	Bobby	Playhouse, Adelaide with STCSA	
1979	The Shaughraun	Reilly	Playhouse, Adelaide with STCSA	
1979	The Caucasian Chalk Circle	Simon Chachava	Sydney Opera House with STC	
1979	The Matchmaker		Playhouse, Adelaide with STCSA	
1979; 1980	Twelfth Night	Sebastian	Playhouse, Adelaide with STC	
1980	Traitors	Joseph Rubin	Nimrod Theatre Co, Sydney	
1980	Oresteia	Old Person of Aros / Elektra / Orestes	Nimrod Theatre Co, Sydney	
1980	Inside the Island	Private O'Neill / Bert / Private Watson	Nimrod Theatre Co, Sydney	
1980	Volpone	Bornario / Peregrine	Nimrod Theatre, Sydney with STC	
1981	The Man from Mukinupin	Jack Tuesday / Harry Tuesday	Sydney Opera House with STC	
1981	Hamlet	Hamlet	Sydney Opera House with STC	
1981; 1985	Cloud Nine	Betty / Edward	Nimrod Theatre, Sydney with STC	
1982	Macbeth	Macduff	Sydney Opera House with STC	
1982	Butterflies of Kalimantan		Women in Arts Festival	
1983	Miss Julie		Nimrod Theatre Co, Sydney	
1983	The Bear		Nimrod Theatre Co, Sydney	
1984	King Lear	Edmund	Bankstown District Sports Club, Sydney, Seymour Centre, Sydney with Nimrod Theatre Co	
1985	Il Magnifico	Lorenzo Medici	Seymour Centre, Sydney with Nimrod Theatre Co	
1985	Zastrossi	Zastrossi	Seymour Centre, Sydney with Nimrod Theatre Co	
1986	Sweet Bird of Youth	Chance Wayne	Lyric Theatre, Brisbane, Opera Theatre, Adelaide, Her Majesty's Theatre, Sydney, Princess Theatre, Melbourne with Davis Morley & Harold Pinter Productions	
1986	Hedda Gabler	Ejlert Løvborg	Wharf Theatre, Sydney with STC	
1987	The Winter’s Tale	Leontes	Seymour Centre, Sydney with Nimrod Theatre Co	
1988	Orphans	Treat	Sydney Opera House, Canberra Theatre, Regal Theatre, Perth with Gary Penny Productions	
1991	The Cherry Orchard	Lapakhin	Suncorp Theatre, Brisbane with QTC	
1992	Shadow & Splendour	Viktor Sager	Suncorp Theatre, Brisbane with QTC, Playhouse, Adelaide	
1994	The Temple	Laurie Blake	Wharf Theatre, Sydney with STC	
1994	Macbeth	Macduff	Sydney Opera House with STC	
1995	The Incorruptible	Ion Stafford	Malthouse Theatre, Melbourne with Playbox Theatre	
1999	Macbeth	Macbeth	STC	
2001	The School for Scandal	Sir Peter Teazle	Sydney Opera House with STC	
2001	Dom Juan		STC	
2002	Copenhagen	Heisenberg	Wharf Theatre, Sydney, Glen St Theatre, Sydney with STC	
2004	Victory: Choices in Reaction	Charles II	Wharf Theatre, Sydney with STC	
2011	Zebra	Larry	STC	
2012	Death of a Salesman	Willy Loman	Belvoir, Sydney, Geelong Arts Centre, Theatre Royal Sydney	
2012; 2013	Red	Mark Rothko	The Sumner, Melbourne with MTC, Playhouse, Brisbane with QTC	
2013	Moving Parts	Sean	NIDA Parade Theatre, Sydney	
2015	Endgame	Hamm	Southbank Theatre, Melbourne with MTC	
2015	Mortido	Detective Grubbe	Dunstan Playhouse, Adelaide, Belvoir, Sydney	
2015	Summer of the Seventeenth Doll	Roo	STCSA	
2016	Skylight	Tom Sergeant	Southbank Theatre, Melbourne with MTC	
2016	Faith Healer	Francis Hardy	Belvoir, Sydney, Southbank Theatre, Melbourne	
2018	Scaramouche Jones	Scaramouche Jones	Fairfax Studio with Arts Centre Melbourne, Space Theatre, Adelaide	
2018	The Dance of Death	Edgar	Belvoir, Sydney / STCSA	
2019	Life of Galileo	Galileo Galilei	Belvoir, Sydney	
2024	Into the Shimmering World	Ray	Wharf Theatre, Sydney with STC	
2025–2026	The True History of the Life and Death of King Lear & His Three Daughters	King Lear	Belvoir Theatre, Sydney	

== Awards & nominations ==
Year	Work	Award	Category	Result	Ref
1986	Malcolm	AFI Awards	Best Actor in a Leading Role	Won	
1987	Ground Zero	AFI Awards	Best Actor in a Leading Role	Nominated	
1991	Dingo	AFI Awards	Best Actor in a Leading Role	Nominated	
1995	Halifax f.p.: Hard Corps	AFI Awards	Best Performance by an Actor in a Television Drama	Won	
1997	Water Rats	Logie Awards	Most Outstanding Actor in a Series	Won	
1998	Water Rats	People's Choice Awards	Favourite Actor in a Drama or Serial	Nominated	
1999	Water Rats	People's Choice Awards	Favourite Actor in a Drama or Serial	Won	
1999	Colin Friels	People's Choice Awards	Favourite TV Star	Nominated	
2000	Water Rats	Logie Awards	Most Outstanding Actor in a Series	Nominated	
2000	Water Rats	Logie Awards	Most Popular Actor	Nominated	
2002	Copenhagen	Mo Awards	Best Male Actor in a Play	Won	
2003	Copenhagen	Helpmann Awards	Best Male Actor	Won	
2004	Tom White	AFI Awards	Best Actor in a Leading Role	Nominated	
2004	Tom White	IF Awards	Best Actor	Won	
2004	Tom White	Film Critics Circle of Australia Awards	Best Actor	Won	
2004	Victory	Glugs Theatrical Awards	Outstanding Performance	Nominated	
2006	Solo	Film Critics Circle of Australia Awards	Best Actor – Male	Nominated	
2006	The Book of Revelation	Film Critics Circle Awards	Best Supporting Actor	Nominated	
2008	Colin Friels	Movie Extra FilmInk Awards	Peter Finch Lifetime Achievement Award	Honoured	
2012	Red	Green Room Awards	Best Actor	Won	
2012	Red	Helpmann Awards	Best Male Actor in a Play	Nominated	
2013	Death of a Salesman	Helpmann Awards	Best Male Actor in a Play	Won	
2015	Mortido	Sydney Theatre Awards	Best Actor in a Leading Role in a Mainstream Production	Nominated	
2016	Mortido	Helpmann Awards	Best Male Actor in a Supporting Role in a Play	Nominated	
2017	Faith Healer	Helpmann Awards	Best Male Actor in a Play	Nominated	
2019	Mystery Road	Equity Ensemble Awards	Outstanding Performance by an Ensemble in a Drama Series	Won	
2022	Wakefield	Logie Awards	Most Outstanding Supporting Actor	Won	
