= Tom White (film) =

2004 film by Alkinos Tsilimidos

- Directed by: Alkinos Tsilimidos
- Written by: Daniel Keene
- Produced by: Daniel Scharf
- Starring: Colin Friels, Rachael Blake, Dan Spielman, Loene Carmen
- Music by: Paul Kelly & the Boon Companions
- Distributed by: Cinemavault Releasing
- Release date: 19 August 2004 (Australia)
- Running time: 106 minutes
- Country: Australia
- Language: English

Tom White is a 2004 film directed by Alkinos Tsilimidos.

== Plot ==
Tom White is an architect who chooses to make himself homeless. Outwardly, he has signs of a successful life—large home, loving family, successful career. However, it soon becomes clear that not everything is as it appears at work. Tom consciously takes a different path and cuts ties with his normal life. He has chosen the streets, where those he meets, in spite of their position, have enormous self-dignity—the rent boy, an ex-junkie, a gentle-but-manly tramp and a 14-year-old graffiti artist. Tom goes on a personal journey of his own as he plumbs outsider society, yet he discovers his own dignity and gains an understanding of who he is.

== Cast ==
Actor	Role
Colin Friels	Tom White
Rachael Blake	Helen White
Dan Spielman	Matt
Loene Carmen	Christine
David Field	Phil
Bill Hunter	Malcolm
Jarryd Jinks	Jet
Angela Punch McGregor	Irene
Kevin Harrington	Neil
Tony Nikolakopoulos	Sergeant
Ashley Zukerman	Thug #2
Laura Gordon	Secretary
Peter Curtin	Noel Cartwright
John Brumpton	Plain Clothes Officer

== Production ==
The film was scored by Paul Kelly and the Boon Companions: Dan Kelly, Dan Luscombe, Peter Luscombe and Bill MacDonald.

== Release ==
The film was released in Australian cinemas on 19 August 2004 and played until 1 September 2004. The film premiered on 31 July 2004 at the Melbourne International Film Festival. It was also screened at the Cannes Film Market on 13 May 2004; the Pusan International Film Festival (South Korea) on 10 October 2004; Australian Film Festival (Singapore) on 11 March 2005; the Commonwealth Film Festival (United Kingdom) on 4 May 2005 and at the Saint-Tropez Festival of the Antipodes (France) on 20 October 2005.

== Reception ==
Tom White received mixed critical reviews. The first weekend of release, Tom White was number 20 on the Australian Box office with an intake of A$56,219 (total $147, 495).

== Awards ==
- Winner – Golden Tripod, Australian Cinematographers Society – 2004
- Winner – Inside Film (IF) Awards – Best Actor – Australia, 2004
- Winner – 3 Film Critics Circle of Australia Awards – Best Actor, Best Editing, Best Original Screenplay, Best Supporting Actor – Australia, 2004
- Nominated – 13 Australian Film Institute Awards including Best Film, Best Director, Best Original Screenplay, Best Actor, Best Supporting Actor, Best Supporting Actress, Best Cinematography – Australia, 2004
- Nominated – 5 Inside Film (IF) Awards including Best Film, Best Actress, Best Cinematography, Best Script – Australia, 2004
- Nominated – 6 Film Critics Circle of Australia Awards including Best Film, Best Director, Best Supporting Actor, Best Supporting Actress – Australia, 2004

== Box office ==
Tom White grossed $277,234 at the box office in Australia.

== See also ==
- Cinema of Australia
