= List of films with live action and animation =

This is a list of films with live-action and animation, films that combine live-action and animation elements, typically interacting.

== Short films by decade ==
=== 1900s ===
- 1900 – The Enchanted Drawing

=== 1910s ===
- 1914 – Gertie the Dinosaur
- 1917 – När Kapten Grogg skulle porträtteras ("When Captain Grogg was to be painted")
- 1918 – Out of the Inkwell series (animated characters in live-action surroundings: series between 1918 and 1929)

=== 1920s ===
- 1923 – Alice Comedies series (live-action girl in animated surroundings, produced from 1923 to 1927)
- 1929 – Bosko, the Talk-Ink Kid

=== 1930s ===
- 1933 – Zero for Conduct
- 1936 – Puppet Show
- 1938 – Daffy Duck in Hollywood (live-action film clips)

=== 1940s ===
- 1940 – You Ought to Be in Pictures
- 1940 – Eatin' on the Cuff or The Moth Who Came to Dinner
- 1943 – Who Killed Who? (two live-action sequences)
- 1944 – What's Cookin' Doc?
- 1948 – Melody Time
- 1949 – Señor Droopy
- 1949 – The House of Tomorrow
- 1949 – Rabbit Hood (footage from The Adventures of Robin Hood)
- 1949 -- My Dream Is Yours

=== 1950s ===
- 1951 – Cold Turkey (live-action wrestling match on TV)
- 1953 – The Three Little Pups (cowboys riding horses; Southern Wolf riding on black-and-white live-action horse)
- 1959 – Donald in Mathmagic Land (live-action character at a billiards game, orchestra, paintings, human figures and live-action objects)
- 1959 – The Mouse That Jack Built (live-action sequence at the end)

=== 1960s ===
- 1961 – Donald and the Wheel (silhouettes of two actors, live-action objects and female dancer)
- 1961 – The Litterbug (opening and closing credits live-action environments)
- 1965 – Pink Panzer
- 1966 – Winnie the Pooh and the Honey Tree (opening and closing sequences)
- 1967 – Jack and the Beanstalk
- 1968 – Winnie the Pooh and the Blustery Day (opening and closing sequences)

=== 1970s ===
- 1970 – The Adventures of Milo in the Phantom Tollbooth (live-action transitions into animated environments)
- 1974 – Winnie the Pooh and Tigger Too (opening and closing sequences)
- 1976 – Bugs and Daffy's Carnival of the Animals (animated characters in live-action environments)

=== 1980s ===
- 1983 – Winnie the Pooh and a Day for Eeyore (opening and closing sequences)
- 1983 – What Have We Learned, Charlie Brown? (partially colorized World War II footage)

=== 1990s ===
- 1990 – Deepa & Rupa: A Fairy Tale from India (India animated short)
- 1990 – Rockin' Through the Decades (TV special)
- 1991 – Nilus the Sandman: The Boy Who Dreamed Christmas (TV specials)
- 1992 – Invasion of the Bunny Snatchers (one shot of a live-action mouth on Daffy Duck's bill)
- 1995 – Circle of Life: An Environmental Fable

=== 2000s ===
- 2004 – Save Virgil
- 2006 – The Sparky Book
- 2007 – Jay and Seth Versus the Apocalypse

=== 2010s ===
- 2010 – Pixels

=== 2020s ===
- 2023 – Once Upon a Studio

== Primary animated films by decade ==
=== 1930s ===
- 1937 – Snow White and the Seven Dwarfs (book only)

=== 1940s ===
- 1940 – Fantasia
- 1942 – Saludos Amigos
- 1943 – Victory Through Air Power (animated documentary)
- 1944 – The Three Caballeros
- 1946 – Make Mine Music (David Lichine and Tatiana Riabouchinska in 'Two Silhouettes')
- 1947 – Fun and Fancy Free (story sequences)
- 1948 – Melody Time (with Amigo Lady from Blame it on the Samba and Roy Rogers, Bobby Driscoll, and Luana Patten from Pecos Bill)
- 1949 – The Adventures of Ichabod and Mr. Toad (only library)

=== 1950s ===
- 1950 – Cinderella (prologue only)
- 1957 – The Snow Queen (live-action prologue with Art Linkletter)
- 1959 – Sleeping Beauty (prologue only)

=== 1960s ===
- 1965 – The Man from Button Willow (live-action opening sequence)
- 1966 – The Daydreamer (live-action and stop-motion sequences)
- 1968 – Yellow Submarine

=== 1970s ===
- 1970 – The Phantom Tollbooth
- 1972 – Daffy Duck and Porky Pig Meet the Groovie Goolies (TV) - (live action Mad Mirror Land sequence)
- 1974 – Down and Dirty Duck
- 1974 – Journey Back to Oz
- 1975 – Han's Christian Andersen's The Little Mermaid (live-action sequences) (Japanese Anime)
- 1976 – Allegro Non Troppo (Italian animated film)
- 1976 – Once Upon a Girl
- 1977 – Raggedy Ann & Andy: A Musical Adventure
- 1977 – The Many Adventures of Winnie the Pooh (opening and closing sequences)
- 1977 – Dot and the Kangaroo
- 1978 – The Lord of the Rings
- 1978 – Metamorphoses (Japanese anime)

=== 1980s ===
- 1981 – American Pop
- 1981 – Around the World with Dot (Australian animation)
- 1983 – Dot and the Bunny (Australian animation)
- 1983 – Twice Upon a Time (animated film with color live-action sequences)
- 1986 – Dot and Keeto (Australian animation)
- 1986 – Dot and the Whale (Australian animation)
- 1986 – The Kingdom Chums: Little David's Adventure (TV special)
- 1987 – Dot and the Smugglers (Australian animation)
- 1987 – Dot Goes to Hollywood (Australian animation)
- 1987 – Twilight of the Cockroaches (Japanese anime)
- 1987 – Yogi Bear and the Magical Flight of the Spruce Goose (TV film: live-action footage of Spruce Goose flight shown during museum tour)
- 1988 – Treasure Island (Soviet film)
- 1988 – It's the Girl in the Red Truck, Charlie Brown (TV special)
- 1988 – Katy, Kiki y Koko (a.k.a. Katy Meets the Aliens or Katy and the Katerpillar Kids - aliens watch live-action footage from Earth) (Spanish animation)

=== 1990s ===
- 1990 – Werner – Beinhart! (German Animation)
- 1991 – Rock-A-Doodle
- 1992 – Blinky Bill: The Mischievous Koala (Australian animation)
- 1993 – Opéra imaginaire (France Stop-motion)
- 1994 – Pumuckl und der blaue Klabauter (German animation)
- 1994 – Dot in Space (Australian Animation)
- 1994 – Faust (Czech Republic animation)
- 1994 – The Pagemaster
- 1995 – Balto (live-action scenes at the start and end of the film)
- 1996 – James and the Giant Peach
- 1997 – The End of Evangelion (Japanese Anime)
- 1999 – South Park: Bigger, Longer & Uncut (character with live-action face and live-action posters seen in background)
- 1999 – Belle's Tales of Friendship (direct-to-video film)
- 1999 – Fantasia 2000

=== 2000s ===
- 2000 – The Tigger Movie
- 2000 – Dinosaur
- 2001 – Christmas Carol: The Movie (British animation)
- 2001 – The Book of Pooh: Stories from the Heart
- 2002 – The Wild Thornberrys Movie (footage of live-action animals throughout the end credits)
- 2003 – Y Mabinogi (the majority of this film was animated, although the opening and closing acts were live-action)
- 2004 – Cine Gibi: O Filme (Brazil animation)
- 2004 – Springtime with Roo
- 2004 – The Lion King 1½ (live-action commercial on theater screen when Pumbaa sits on a remote)
- 2005 – The Piano Tuner of Earthquakes (direct-to-video film)
- 2006 – Happy Feet
- 2006 – Princess (animation with live-action scenes) (Danish animation)
- 2006 – Arthur and the Invisibles (French animation)
- 2007 – Chicago 10 (animation documentary)
- 2008 – WALL-E
- 2008 – Fly Me to the Moon (live-action ending sequence)
- 2008 – Igor (live-action scenes and James Lipton cameo on TV)
- 2008 – Waltz with Bashir (one live-action sequence)
- 2009 – Arthur and the Revenge of Maltazard (French animation)

=== 2010s ===
- 2010 – Arthur 3: The War of the Two Worlds (France animation)
- 2011 – Brasil Animado (Brazil animation)
- 2011 – Winnie the Pooh
- 2011 – Happy Feet Two
- 2012 – El Santos vs. la Tetona Mendoza (Mexican animation)
- 2013 – The Congress (Israeli animation)
- 2013 – Shimajirō to Fufu no Daibōken: Sukue! Nanairo no Hana (Japanese Anime)
- 2013 – Walking with Dinosaurs (British animation)
- 2013 – Minuscule: Valley of the Lost Ants (France-Belgium animation)
- 2014 – Gekijōban Cardfight!! Vanguard (Japanese Anime)
- 2014 – The Lego Movie
- 2014 – Shimajiro to Kujira no Uta (Japanese Anime)
- 2014 – Seth's Dominion (Canada animated documentary)
- 2015 – Madea's Tough Love (DTV film; live-action opening and closing scenes)
- 2015 – Shimajirō to Ōkina Ki (Japanese Anime)
- 2016 – Shimajirō to Kuni Ehon (Japanese Anime)
- 2016 – Sausage Party (live action footage of actors shown during final scene)
- 2016 – Yo-kai Watch: Soratobu Kujira to Double no Sekai no Daibōken da Nyan! (Japanese Anime)
- 2016 – Upin & Ipin: Jeng Jeng Jeng! (Malaysian animation)
- 2017 – The Lego Batman Movie (footage from Jerry Maguire)
- 2017 – Captain Underpants: The First Epic Movie (live-action puppetry sequence)
- 2017 – The Lego Ninjago Movie
- 2019 – The Lego Movie 2: The Second Part
- 2019 – Playmobil: The Movie

=== 2020s ===
- 2020 – Phineas and Ferb the Movie: Candace Against the Universe (DTV film brief live-action segment)
- 2021 – The Mitchells vs. the Machines (live-action puppetry, footage, and imagery)
- 2023 – Spider-Man: Across the Spider-Verse (live-action scene featuring Peggy Lu as Mrs. Chen, live-action appearance of Donald Glover as an alternate version of Aaron Davis / Prowler, and footage from Spider-Man (2002) and The Amazing Spider-Man (2012)
- 2023 – Teenage Mutant Ninja Turtles: Mutant Mayhem (footage from Ferris Bueller's Day Off and Snake Fist Fighter)
- 2023 – Wish (Book only)
- 2024 – Sanatorium Under the Sign of the Hourglass
- 2024 – Saving Bikini Bottom: The Sandy Cheeks Movie
- 2025 – Plankton: The Movie
- 2025 – Smurfs
- 2025 – Gabby's Dollhouse: The Movie
- 2025 – The SpongeBob Movie: Search for SquarePants

== Primary live-action feature films by decade ==
=== 1920s ===
- 1925 – The Lost World (Dinosaurs made by Willis O'Brien)

=== 1930s ===
- 1930 – King of Jazz (animated segment by Walter Lantz)
- 1931 – Frankenstein (live-action)
- 1933 – Alice in Wonderland (animated segment "The Walrus and the Carpenter")
- 1933 – King Kong (King Kong made by Willis O'Brien)
- 1933 – Son of Kong (Little Kong made by Willis O'Brien)
- 1933 – Zero for Conduct
- 1934 – Babes in Toyland
- 1934 – Hollywood Party (animated segment "The Hot Choc-Late Soldiers")
- 1934 – Servants' Entrance (sequence with animated singing silverware)
- 1935 – The New Gulliver
- 1939 – The Golden Key

=== 1940s ===
- 1941 – The Lady Eve
- 1941 – The Reluctant Dragon
- 1945 – Anchors Aweigh (Tom and Jerry make an appearance)
- 1946 – Song of the South
- 1946 – Holiday in Mexico
- 1946 – Ziegfeld Follies - (deleted stop-motion sequence)
- 1948 – Superman (flying sequences)
- 1948 – Two Guys from Texas
- 1949 – Alice in Wonderland
- 1949 – Mighty Joe Young (Joe Young made by Willis O'Brien and Ray Harryhausen)
- 1949 – My Dream Is Yours
- 1949 – So Dear to My Heart

=== 1950s ===
- 1950 – Atom Man vs. Superman
- 1950 – Destination Moon
- 1950 – The Great Rupert
- 1950 - Cheaper by the Dozen
- 1953 – Dangerous When Wet (Tom and Jerry make an appearance)
- 1954 – Godzilla (stop-motion scene of Godzilla's tail destroying the Nichigeki Theater building)
- 1956 – Forbidden Planet
- 1956 – Invitation to the Dance (The third and final segment of Sinbad the Sailor)
- 1957 – The Black Scorpion
- 1958 – Tom Thumb
- 1958 – Vertigo (Dream Sequence)
- 1959 – I Was a Satellite of the Sun
- 1959 – The Giant Behemoth
- 1959 – The Devil's Disciple
- 1959 – Darby O'Gill and the Little People

=== 1960s ===
- 1960 – The 3 Worlds of Gulliver
- 1961 – The Parent Trap (opening and closing credits sequence in stop-motion)
- 1961 – Babes in Toyland (stop-motion soldiers)
- 1962 – Jack the Giant Killer
- 1962 – The Fabulous Baron Munchausen
- 1962 – The Wonderful World of the Brothers Grimm
- 1963 – Cici Can (animated ghost by Yalçın Çetin)
- 1963 – The Pink Panther
- 1963 – It's a Mad, Mad, Mad, Mad World (opening credits sequence)
- 1964 – Mary Poppins
- 1964 – A Shot in the Dark
- 1964 – Dogora (animated tentacle sequences)
- 1964 – The Incredible Mr. Limpet
- 1964 – Tale about the Lost Time
- 1964 – The Misadventures of Merlin Jones (stop-motion opening sequence)
- 1964 – A Jester's Tale
- 1964 – A Fistful of Dollars
- 1966 – The Stolen Airship
- 1966 - After the Fox (animated opening title sequence)
- 1967 – Doctor Dolittle
- 1967 – Bedazzled (characters turn into animated flies)
- 1968 – Yokai Monsters: One Hundred Monsters
- 1968 – The Charge of the Light Brigade (opening sequence and linking sequences by Richard Williams)
- 1968 – Madigan's Millions (animated collage opening credits sequence)
- 1968 – Inspector Clouseau (Pink Panther sequences)
- 1968 – Out of an Old Man's Head
- 1968 – Head

=== 1970s ===
- 1970 – Song of Norway
- 1970 – The Nameless Knight
- 1970 – Cry of the Banshee (animated opening credits sequence)
- 1971 – On the Comet
- 1971 – Bedknobs and Broomsticks (animated book, nightclub and soccer match)
- 1971 – Godzilla vs. Hedorah (animated sequences)
- 1971 – The Million Dollar Duck (animated eggs and duck shown throughout opening credits sequence)
- 1971 – And Now for Something Completely Different
- 1971 – 200 Motels
- 1972 – Godzilla vs. Gigan (manga sequences)
- 1972 – The Enchanted World of Danny Kaye: The Emperor's New Clothes (live-action with stop-motion and animated sequences)
- 1972 – The War Between Men and Women
- 1973 – Heavy Traffic
- 1973 – Marco (live-action and stop-motion sequences)
- 1974 – The Little Prince
- 1974 – Dunderklumpen!
- 1975 – Coonskin
- 1975 – Monty Python and the Holy Grail (animated sequences)
- 1975 – The Return of the Pink Panther
- 1975 – Bugs Bunny: Superstar (documentary with animated and live-action footage)
- 1976 – Futureworld (CGI-animated hand from the 1972 film A Computer Animated Hand and CGI-animated face from the 1974 film Faces & Body Parts)
- 1976 – Eraserhead (one scene)
- 1976 – I, Tintin
- 1976 – The Pink Panther Strikes Again
- 1977 – Pete's Dragon (Elliot the dragon)
- 1977 – Star Wars (stop-motion Holochess sequence created by Tippett Studio, and CGI-animated Death Star attack plan briefing sequence from Jet Propulsion Laboratory made by Larry Cuba and Gary Imhoff)
- 1977 – Freaky Friday (opening sequences)
- 1977 – Dot and the Kangaroo
- 1977 – Annie Hall
- 1977 – Sender Nordlicht
- 1978 – Hanna-Barbera's All-Star Comedy Ice Revue
- 1978 – The Water Babies
- 1978 – Revenge of the Pink Panther
- 1978 – Grease (animated opening sequence)
- 1978 – The Light Princess (backgrounds and most animals are animated)
- 1978 – Star Wars Holiday Special (animated segment called "The Faithful Wookiee")
- 1979 – Monty Python's Life of Brian (animated sequences)
- 1979 – The Little Convict
- 1979 – Baby Snakes
- 1979 – The Black Hole (CGI-animated opening sequence)
- 1979 – Harpya

=== 1980s ===
- 1980 – The Great Rock & Roll Swindle (some segments)
- 1980 – Xanadu (animated sequence by Don Bluth)
- 1980 – 9 to 5 (one scene)
- 1980 – Gamera: Super Monster (animated sequence)
- 1980 – Popeye (opening animated sequence)
- 1981 – The Great Muppet Caper (animated fly and birds)
- 1981 – Maria, Mirabela
- 1981 – The Evil Dead (stop-motion scene)
- 1982 – Creepshow (animated opening credits sequence and animated bridging sequences between anthology segments)
- 1982 – Pink Floyd The Wall (animated sequences by Gerald Scarfe)
- 1982 – Tron
- 1982 – Trail of the Pink Panther
- 1983 – Twice Upon a Time (animated film with color live-action sequences)
- 1983 – The Meaning of Life
- 1983 – Superman III (animated sequence created by Atari showing Superman dodging missiles)
- 1983 – Twilight Zone: The Movie
- 1983 – Curse of the Pink Panther
- 1984 – The Camel Boy
- 1984 – Cannonball Run II
- 1984 – The Last Starfighter (footage from fictional Starfighter video game)
- 1984 – Caravan of Courage: An Ewok Adventure (stop-motion animation)
- 1985 – Return to Oz (animated special effects by Will Vinton)
- 1985 – Os Trapalhões no Reino da Fantasia
- 1985 – Better Off Dead (stop-motion burger scene)
- 1985 – Pee-wee's Big Adventure
- 1985 – Sesame Street Presents: Follow That Bird (animated sequences)
- 1985 – Ewoks: The Battle for Endor (stop-motion animation)
- 1986 – Aliens (go-motion shots of Alien Queen)
- 1986 – The Adventures of Milo and Otis
- 1986 – Flight of the Navigator
- 1986 – Ruthless People (animated opening sequence by Sally Cruikshank)
- 1986 – One Crazy Summer (animated sequences)
- 1986 – Howard the Duck (stop-motion effects designed by Phil Tippett)
- 1987 – Creepshow 2 (animated opening credits sequence and animated bridging sequences between anthology segments)
- 1987 – Mannequin (Sally Cruikshank title animated sequence)
- 1987 – Twilight of the Cockroaches
- 1987 – Evil Dead 2 (stop-motion scene)
- 1987 – A Mouse, A Mystery and Me
- 1988 – Totally Minnie (TV special)
- 1988 – Beetlejuice (stop-motion effects)
- 1988 – Alice
- 1988 – Moonwalker (Will Vinton "Speed Demon" segment)
- 1988 – Mickey's 60th Birthday (TV special)
- 1988 – Who Framed Roger Rabbit
- 1988 – Big Top Pee-wee
- 1989 – Going Overboard (animated sequences)
- 1989 – Raja Chinna Roja
- 1989 – A Nightmare on Elm Street 5: The Dream Child ('Super Freddy' animated comic book sequence)
- 1989 – Godzilla vs. Biollante (stop-motion and animated sequences; deleted scenes)
- 1989 – National Lampoon's Christmas Vacation (opening credits)
- 1989 – The Wizard (footage from video games)
- 1989 – Bill & Ted's Excellent Adventure
- 1989 – Honey, I Shrunk the Kids (opening credits sequence)
- 1989 – Little Monsters
- 1989 – Troop Beverly Hills (opening credits sequence)

=== 1990s ===
- 1990 – Army of Darkness (stop-motion skeletons)
- 1990 – Gremlins 2: The New Batch (electric gremlin, stop-motion, and Chuck Jones animated opening and ending sequences)
- 1990 – Deepa & Rupa: A Fairy Tale from India
- 1990 – Grim Prairie Tales (dream sequence)
- 1990 – Madhouse (Sally Cruikshank title animated sequence)
- 1990 – Rockin' Through the Decades
- 1991 – Bill & Ted's Bogus Journey
- 1991 – Problem Child 2 (Cartoon rabies scene)
- 1991 – Nilus the Sandman: The Boy Who Dreamed Christmas
- 1991 – Volere volare
- 1991 – City Slickers (Wayne Fitzgerald & Bob Kurtz animated title sequence)
- 1991 – Freddy's Dead: The Final Nightmare (sequence set inside a video game)
- 1992 – Cool World
- 1992 – Evil Toons
- 1992 – Stay Tuned (Chuck Jones-animated sequence)
- 1992 – The Lawnmower Man (animated sequences)
- 1992 – Braindead (one scene)
- 1992 – Blinky Bill: The Mischievous Koala
- 1992 – Honey, I Blew Up the Kid (opening credits sequence)
- 1993 – O' Faby
- 1993 – Son of the Pink Panther
- 1993 – Last Action Hero (one animated character)
- 1993 – Super Mario Bros. (stop-motion dinosaurs shown in opening sequence)
- 1993 – Jurassic Park (John Hammond shown with "Mr. DNA", an animated DNA strand, as part of a projector presentation at the park's visitor center)
- 1993 – Opéra imaginaire
- 1993 – Mrs. Doubtfire (cartoon on screen at beginning)
- 1994 – Pumuckl und der blaue Klabauter
- 1994 – Dot in Space
- 1994 – Natural Born Killers
- 1994 – Taxandria
- 1994 – Faust
- 1994 – The NeverEnding Story III (animated music video watched by Mr. Rockbiter Jr. on television)
- 1994 – The Flintstones
- 1994 – City Slickers II: The Legend of Curly's Gold (animated title sequence)
- 1994 – The Mask
- 1994 – The Pagemaster
- 1994 – Cabin Boy
- 1994 – In Search of Dr. Seuss
- 1995 – Circle of Life: An Environmental Fable
- 1995 – Casper
- 1995 – Tank Girl (animated sequences)
- 1995 – Mortal Kombat
- 1995 – Mighty Morphin Power Rangers: The Movie (CGI Zords)
- 1996 – Conspirators of Pleasure
- 1996 – Joe's Apartment
- 1996 – The Adventures of Pinocchio
- 1996 – The Stupids
- 1996 – James and the Giant Peach
- 1996 – Space Jam
- 1996 – 101 Dalmatians (TV)
- 1996 – Sabrina the Teenage Witch
- 1997 – Casper: A Spirited Beginning
- 1997 – George of the Jungle (animated opening)
- 1997 – The End of Evangelion
- 1997 – For the Bible Tells Me So
- 1997 – Titanic (computer-animated graphics recreating the sinking of the Titanic shown by Lewis Bodine to an elderly Rose Dawson Calvert)
- 1997 – Mr. Magoo (opening and closing sequences)
- 1997 – The Wiggles Movie
- 1997 – Flubber
- 1998 – Casper Meets Wendy
- 1998 – Lost in Space
- 1998 – Run Lola Run
- 1998 – Small Soldiers
- 1998 – Sabrina Goes to Rome
- 1999 – My Favorite Martian
- 1999 – Belle's Tales of Friendship
- 1999 – Sabrina Down Under (CGI fish sequence)
- 1999 – Fantasia 2000
- 1999 – Stuart Little

=== 2000s ===
- 2000 – The 10th Kingdom (animated butterflies and hearts, and the singing ring, in the Kissing Town sequence and the coronation banquet scene)
- 2000 – The Flintstones in Viva Rock Vegas
- 2000 – The Adventures of Rocky and Bullwinkle
- 2000 – Little Otik
- 2000 – How the Grinch Stole Christmas
- 2001 – Tomcats (animated opening credits sequence featuring animals from the main character's comic strip)
- 2001 – Evolution
- 2001 – Osmosis Jones
- 2001 – Monkeybone
- 2001 – Amélie (computer-animated elements, including imaginary crocodile and pig lamp)
- 2001 – Hedwig and the Angry Inch (The Origin of Love sequence)
- 2001 – Big Shot's Funeral
- 2001 – Freddy Got Fingered (Zebras in America sequence)
- 2001 – Cats & Dogs
- 2001 – Rat Race
- 2001 – Christmas Carol: The Movie
- 2002 – El Rey de la Granja (The King Farm)
- 2002 – Kung Pow! Enter the Fist (Lion King parody sequence)
- 2002 – The Dangerous Lives of Altar Boys
- 2002 – Bowling for Columbine (animated sequence explaining the history of the United States)
- 2002 – Resident Evil (CGI sequence showing map of underground facility known as the Hive)
- 2002 – Scooby-Doo
- 2002 – Stuart Little 2
- 2002 – Frida
- 2002 – Catch Me If You Can (animated opening credits sequence)
- 2003 – The Haunted Mansion
- 2003 – Kangaroo Jack
- 2003 – The Lizzie McGuire Movie
- 2003 – Elf (stop-motion characters)
- 2003 – Looney Tunes: Back in Action
- 2003 – George of the Jungle 2 (opening sequence)
- 2003 – The Cat in the Hat
- 2003 – Kill Bill: Volume 1 (one scene)
- 2004 – Kill Bill: Volume 2
- 2004 – Save Virgil
- 2004 – Scooby-Doo 2: Monsters Unleashed
- 2004 – The Punisher (animated opening scene set in Kuwait included in the extended cut)
- 2004 – Super Size Me (animated sequence explaining how chicken nuggets are made)
- 2004 – Back to Gaya (also known as Boo, Zino & the Snurks)
- 2004 – Garfield: The Movie
- 2004 – Immortal (animated sequences)
- 2004 – Anchorman: The Legend of Ron Burgundy (animated sequence)
- 2004 – The SpongeBob SquarePants Movie
- 2004 – Fat Albert
- 2004 – Cine Gibi: O Filme
- 2004 – The Life Aquatic with Steve Zissou
- 2004 – Five Children and It
- 2004 – The World
- 2004 – Ella Enchanted
- 2005 – The Hitchhiker's Guide to the Galaxy (animated guide book sequences)
- 2005 – Son of the Mask
- 2005 – Lunacy
- 2005 – Kiss Kiss Bang Bang (animated opening credits sequence)
- 2005 – The Piano Tuner of Earthquakes
- 2005 – Tom-Yum-Goong (animated dream sequence)
- 2005 – Reefer Madness ("The Brownie Song" sequence)
- 2005 – Fuck (documentary with animated scenes by Bill Plympton)
- 2005 – Are We There Yet?
- 2006 – McDull, the Alumni
- 2006 – Inside Man (sequence depicting footage from fictional Gangstas iz Genocide video game)
- 2006 – Stay Alive (video game sequences)
- 2006 – Hui Buh
- 2006 – Garfield: A Tail of Two Kitties
- 2006 – Hood of Horror
- 2006 – The Science of Sleep
- 2006 – The Sparky Book
- 2006 – How to Eat Fried Worms (animated sequences)
- 2006 – The Fall (one animated sequence)
- 2006 – Happy Feet (live-action sequences)
- 2006 – The Pink Panther (animated opening sequence)
- 2006 – Princess (animated film with live-action scenes)
- 2006 – Miss Potter
- 2006 – Re-Animated
- 2006 – Arthur and the Invisibles
- 2007 – Mr. Magorium's Wonder Emporium (animated opening sequence)
- 2007 – Juno (stop-motion animated opening credits sequence)
- 2007 – Chicago 10 (animated documentary)
- 2007 – Hot Fuzz (animated notebook sequence)
- 2007 – Are We Done Yet? (animated intro)
- 2007 – Enchanted
- 2007 – For the Bible Tells Me So (one animated sequence)
- 2007 – Eagle vs Shark (animated interludes)
- 2007 – Keda Reda
- 2007 – Alvin and the Chipmunks
- 2008 – Waltz with Bashir (one live-action sequence)
- 2008 – Sathyam
- 2008 – Fly Me to the Moon (live-action ending sequence)
- 2008 – Semum (animated demonic creatures)
- 2008 – Hellboy II: The Golden Army (stop-motion puppet prologue sequence)
- 2008 – Igor (live-action scenes and James Lipton cameo on TV)
- 2009 – 500 Days of Summer
- 2009 – Arthur and the Revenge of Maltazard
- 2009 – The Private Lives of Pippa Lee (one scene)
- 2009 – Watchmen (The Ultimate Cut includes the animated short film Tales of the Black Freighter edited in throughout.)
- 2009 – G-Force
- 2009 – SpongeBob's Truth or Square
- 2009 – Cabin Fever 2: Spring Fever (animated sequences)
- 2009 – Shorts: The Adventures of the Wishing Rock
- 2009 – The Pink Panther 2 (animated opening sequence, closing scene with animated character in live-action environment)
- 2009 – Alvin and the Chipmunks: The Squeakquel
- 2009 – The Velveteen Rabbit
- 2009 – Kick
- 2009 – Land of the Lost (animated scenery shown throughout end credits)
- 2009 – Scooby-Doo! The Mystery Begins
- 2009 – Aliens in the Attic

=== 2010s ===
- 2010 – Gainsbourg: A Heroic Life
- 2010 – Howl (animated sequences)
- 2010 – Alice in Wonderland
- 2010 – Diary of a Wimpy Kid (animated sequences)
- 2010 – Furry Vengeance (animated opening sequence)
- 2010 – Never Sleep Again: The Elm Street Legacy (stop-motion and claymation opening credits sequence)
- 2010 – Cats & Dogs: The Revenge of Kitty Galore
- 2010 - Scooby-Doo! Curse of the Lake Monster
- 2010 – Surviving Life
- 2010 – Bunraku
- 2010 – Higglety Pigglety Pop! or There Must Be More to Life (live-action puppetry and stop-motion)
- 2010 – Ultramarines: The Movie
- 2010 – Shank
- 2010 – Ramona and Beezus
- 2010 – Thillalangadi
- 2010 – Scott Pilgrim vs. the World
- 2010 – Harry Potter and the Deathly Hallows – Part 1 (The Tale of the Three Brothers sequence)
- 2010 – Kick-Ass (animated comic book flashback sequence)
- 2010 – Yogi Bear
- 2010 – Jonah Hex (animated backstory sequence)
- 2010 – Don't Go (live-action/animated short by Turgut Akaçık)
- 2010 – Super
- 2010 – Jackass 3D (animated opening scene featuring Beavis and Butt-Head)
- 2010 – Arthur 3: The War of the Two Worlds
- 2011 – Brasil Animado
- 2011 – Diary of a Wimpy Kid: Rodrick Rules (animated sequences)
- 2011 – Hop (CGI Rabbits and Chicks)
- 2011 – Death of a Superhero
- 2011 – A Fairly Odd Movie: Grow Up, Timmy Turner!
- 2011 – Priest (animated prologue sequence)
- 2011 – The Smurfs
- 2011 – Rascals
- 2011 – Happy Feet Two
- 2011 – Judy Moody and the Not Bummer Summer (animated sequences)
- 2011 – Captain America: The First Avenger (animated end credit sequence depicting World War Two)
- 2011 – A Very Harold & Kumar 3D Christmas (claymation sequence)
- 2011 – Alvin and the Chipmunks: Chipwrecked
- 2012 – An Oversimplification of Her Beauty
- 2012 – Yoko
- 2012 – Eega (fly protagonist)
- 2012 – Ted (titular character)
- 2012 – A Fairly Odd Christmas
- 2012 – Sur la Piste du Marsupilami
- 2012 – Diary of a Wimpy Kid: Dog Days (animated sequences)
- 2012 – Gambit (animated opening credits sequence)
- 2012 – Soledad y Larguirucho
- 2013 – Movie 43 (animated cat)
- 2013 – Naiyaandi
- 2013 – Robosapien: Rebooted
- 2013 – The Congress
- 2013 – The Smurfs 2
- 2013 – Percy Jackson: Sea of Monsters (stained glass animated sequence created by Embassy VFX depicting the backstory of Kronos)
- 2013 – Fright Night 2: New Blood (animated motion comic sequence explaining the backstory of Elizabeth Báthory)
- 2013 – Shimajirō to Fufu no Daibōken: Sukue! Nanairo no Hana
- 2013 – Ender's Game (video game sequences)
- 2013 – Walking with Dinosaurs
- 2013 – Das Kleine Gespenst
- 2013 – Minuscule: Valley of the Lost Ants
- 2014 – Gekijōban Cardfight!! Vanguard
- 2014 – The Lego Movie
- 2014 – Captain America: The Winter Soldier (animated end credits sequence)
- 2014 – Balls Out
- 2014 – Bobby Jasoos
- 2014 – Kick
- 2014 – İksir (animated animal characters)
- 2014 – A Fairly Odd Summer
- 2014 – Vaayai Moodi Pesavum
- 2014 – Garm Wars: The Last Druid
- 2014 – Paddington (CGI main protagonist)
- 2014 – Shimajiro to Kujira no Uta
- 2014 – Seth's Dominion
- 2014 – Bill, the Galactic Hero
- 2014 – Teenage Mutant Ninja Turtles
- 2015 – Batkid Begins (animated comic book sequence explaining the origins of Batkid)
- 2015 – Madea's Tough Love (live-action opening and closing scenes)
- 2015 – Me and Earl and the Dying Girl
- 2015 – Absolutely Anything
- 2015 – Köstebekgiller: Perili Orman (animated gopher characters)
- 2015 – Pixels (includes video game ending sequence)
- 2015 – Shimajirō to Ōkina Ki
- 2015 – The Diary of a Teenage Girl (animated sequences)
- 2015 – The SpongeBob Movie: Sponge Out of Water
- 2015 – O Kadhal Kanmani
- 2015 – Ghosthunters: On Icy Trails
- 2015 – We Are Your Friends
- 2015 – American Ultra (animated "Apollo Ape" comic book sequences)
- 2015 – Ted 2 (titular character)
- 2015 – Goosebumps
- 2015 – Krampus (computer-animated sequence)
- 2015 – Kurt Cobain: Montage of Heck (documentary with animated scenes)
- 2015 – Monster Hunt
- 2015 – The Weirdo Hero (animated form of protagonist's self-doubt)
- 2015 – Zoom
- 2015 – Star Wars: The Force Awakens (stop-motion Holochess sequence created by Tippett Studio)
- 2015 – Alvin and the Chipmunks: The Road Chip
- 2016 – Teenage Mutant Ninja Turtles: Out of the Shadows
- 2016 – Pee-wee's Big Holiday
- 2016 – Reveries of a Solitary Walker
- 2016 – Deadpool (character sees animated hallucinations after being stabbed in the head)
- 2016 – Shimajirō to Kuni Ehon
- 2016 – Tower (animated rotoscoped documentary with some unaltered live-action footage)
- 2016 – Alice Through the Looking Glass
- 2016 – The BFG (CGI giants)
- 2016 – Ghostbusters (villain transforms into hand-drawn Ghostbusters logo; there are also CGI ghosts)
- 2016 – Nine Lives
- 2016 – Pete's Dragon (CGI-animated dragon)
- 2016 – Middle School: The Worst Years of My Life (animated sequences)
- 2016 – Yo-kai Watch: Soratobu Kujira to Double no Sekai no Daibōken da Nyan!
- 2016 – Saving Sally (main protagonists interacting with animated characters)
- 2016 – Upin & Ipin: Jeng Jeng Jeng!
- 2016 – A Monster Calls (animated sequences)
- 2016 – Life, Animated (documentary with animated and live-action footage)
- 2017 – Dave Made a Maze (traditionally animated opening credits sequence and later scene where the characters are turned into cardboard puppets)
- 2017 – Hallucination (short film)
- 2017 – Monster Trucks (CGI monsters)
- 2017 – Beauty and the Beast
- 2017 – Ok Jaanu
- 2017 – The Lego Batman Movie (footage from Jerry Maguire)
- 2017 – Monkey Business: The Adventures of Curious George's Creators (documentary of Curious George with animated scenes)
- 2017 – Diary of a Wimpy Kid: The Long Haul (animated sequences)
- 2017 – Spider-Man: Homecoming (animated pencil-drawn end credits sequence)
- 2017 – The Lego Ninjago Movie
- 2017 – Foxtrot (animated sequence)
- 2017 – Keeping Justice (animated sequence)
- 2017 – Woody Woodpecker (CGI-animated title character)
- 2017 – Paddington 2
- 2017 – The Pirates of Somalia (animated sequences)
- 2018 – Monster Hunt 2
- 2018 – Mandy
- 2018 – We the Animals (film) (animated sequences)
- 2018 – Peter Rabbit
- 2018 – A Wrinkle in Time
- 2018 – The Hurricane Heist
- 2018 – Ready Player One
- 2018 – Christopher Robin
- 2018 – Poor Greg Drowning (animated sequences between the live-action scenes)
- 2018 – Freaky Friday (animated faces at the beginning)
- 2018 – Goosebumps 2: Haunted Halloween
- 2018 – The Nutcracker and the Four Realms
- 2018 – Mowgli: Legend of the Jungle
- 2018 – Mary Poppins Returns
- 2018 – Welcome to Marwen
- 2018 – The Samuel Project
- 2018 – Far From Home (short film)
- 2019 – Alita: Battle Angel (protagonist portrayed using motion-capture)
- 2019 – The Lego Movie 2: The Second Part
- 2019 – Pokémon Detective Pikachu
- 2019 – Devi 2
- 2019 – Aladdin
- 2019 – Shazam! (animated sketches during end credits)
- 2019 – Booksmart (stop-motion animation sequences)
- 2019 – Spider-Man: Far From Home (stop-motion end credits sequence created by Perception)
- 2019 – Dora and the Lost City of Gold (includes hand-drawn animation)
- 2019 – Playmobil: The Movie
- 2019 – SpongeBob's Big Birthday Blowout
- 2019 – Mindanao

=== 2020s ===
- 2020 – Cats & Dogs 3: Paws Unite!
- 2020 – The Witches
- 2020 – Bill & Ted Face the Music
- 2020 – Dolittle (animated opening sequence)
- 2020 – Birds of Prey (animated opening sequence)
- 2020 – Sonic the Hedgehog (fully CGI-animated opening sequence and CGI main protagonist)
- 2020 – The Call of the Wild
- 2020 – The SpongeBob Movie: Sponge on the Run
- 2020 – The One and Only Ivan
- 2020 – Phineas and Ferb the Movie: Candace Against the Universe (brief live-action segment)
- 2020 – Shadow in the Cloud (animated opening sequence and animated CGI demon)
- 2020 – I'm Thinking of Ending Things
- 2020 – Jiu Jitsu (animated comic panel sequences)
- 2020 – Magikland
- 2020 – Soul Snatcher
- 2020 – Coolie No. 1
- 2021 – A Loud House Christmas
- 2021 – Major Grom: Plague Doctor (CGI opening credits sequence and hand-drawn end credits sequence)
- 2021 – Tom & Jerry
- 2021 – Teddy
- 2021 – The Mitchells vs. the Machines (animated film with live-action puppetry, footage, and imagery)
- 2021 – Peter Rabbit 2: The Runaway
- 2021 – Space Jam: A New Legacy
- 2021 – The Suicide Squad (animated flowers and birds seen during an action sequence involving Harley Quinn)
- 2021 – Candyman (puppetry animation sequences)
- 2021 – Marcel the Shell with Shoes On
- 2021 – Venom: Let There Be Carnage (animated storybook sequence created by Framestore, depicting the backstory of Cletus Kasady)
- 2021 – Happier Than Ever: A Love Letter to Los Angeles
- 2021 – Clifford the Big Red Dog
- 2021 – Spider-Man: No Way Home (animated end credits sequence created by Imaginary Forces)
- 2022 – Blue's Big City Adventure
- 2022 – Everything Everywhere All at Once (vision of animated parallel universe version of Evelyn Quan Wang)
- 2022 – Chip 'n Dale: Rescue Rangers
- 2022 – Doctor Strange in the Multiverse of Madness (animated universe shown when Stephen Strange and America Chavez travel through the Multiverse. The animated universe was created with 2D animation.)
- 2022 – Karthikeya 2 (film's premise is show in animation)
- 2022 – Disenchanted
- 2022 – Lyle, Lyle, Crocodile
- 2022 – Pinocchio
- 2022 – Sonic the Hedgehog 2
- 2022 – The Guardians of the Galaxy Holiday Special (rotoscoped animation sequences)
- 2022 – The Mean One
- 2022 – Mickey: The Story of a Mouse (live-action opening sequence from Mickey in a Minute)
- 2023 – Beau Is Afraid
- 2023 – Abruptio (the film features life-sized puppets interacting with live-action environments, and also contains hand-drawn animated sequences created by Yellow Mouse Studios, which were shown on the characters' TV screens)
- 2023 – Winnie-the-Pooh: Blood and Honey
- 2023 – Shazam! Fury of the Gods (animated storybook end credits sequence)
- 2023 – Ayalaan
- 2023 – Blue Beetle (stop-motion El Chapulín Colorado sequences)
- 2023 – Strays (brief animated shot during hallucinations)
- 2023 – Candy Cane Lane
- 2024 – Argylle (Pet CGI Cat)
- 2024 – Joker: Folie à Deux (only opening animated scene)
- 2024 – Saving Bikini Bottom: The Sandy Cheeks Movie
- 2024 – IF
- 2024 – Woody Woodpecker Goes to Camp
- 2024 – Harold and the Purple Crayon
- 2024 – Ryan's World the Movie: Titan Universe Adventure
- 2024 – Sonic the Hedgehog 3
- 2024 – Better Man
- 2024 – Paddington in Peru
- 2025 – Bambi: The Reckoning
- 2025 – A Minecraft Movie
- 2025 – Lilo & Stitch
- 2025 – How to Train Your Dragon
- 2025 – The Fantastic Four: First Steps (animated end credits sequence showing a cartoon about the Fantastic Four on television)
- 2025 – Gabby's Dollhouse: The Movie
- 2025 – The SpongeBob Movie: Search for SquarePants
- 2026 – Moana
- 2026 – Scary Movie (KPop Demon Hunters parody sequence)
- 2026 – Coyote vs. Acme
- 2026 – Street Fighter (flashback sequences)
- 2027 – Animal Friends
- 2027 – Sonic the Hedgehog 4
- 2027 – A Minecraft Movie Squared
- 2027 – How to Train Your Dragon 2

== See also ==
- Category: Television series with live action and animation
- List of highest-grossing live-action/animated films
