= Dot and Keeto =

- Film poster
- Directed by: Yoram Gross
- Screenplay by: John Palmer
- Based on: Dot and the Kangaroo by Ethel Pedley
- Produced by: Yoram Gross
- Starring: Robyn Moore; Keith Scott; Barbara Frawley; Ross Higgins
- Cinematography: Graham Sharpe
- Edited by: Rod Hay; Andrew Plain
- Music by: John Sangster; Bob Young
- Production company: Yoram Gross Films
- Distributed by: Hoyts Distribution (Australia)
- Release date: 22 May 1986
- Running time: 75 minutes
- Country: Australia
- Language: English

Dot and Keeto is a 1986 Australian animated film directed by Yoram Gross. It is the fourth sequel to the 1977 film Dot and the Kangaroo, which in turn was based on the children's book of the same name by Ethel Pedley.

== Plot ==
When Dot, a young girl, accidentally eats a magic root and temporarily becomes a giantess before then shrinking to the size of an insect, she is suddenly alone in a world of giant creatures and bushland. Her previous good deed of rescuing a helpless mosquito and dragonfly from the peril of a spider's web has guarantees her two reliable helpful friends: Keeto the mosquito and Butterwalk the caterpillar. With her new friends by her side, and a surprise visit by an old friend, Dot sets out on a grand adventure to discover a way to return to her original size.

== Cast ==
- Robyn Moore as:
  - The voice of Dot, a young, perpetually barefoot, red-headed Australian girl who loves animals
  - The voice of Simon, Dot's brother
  - The voice of Dot and Simon's mother
  - Kangaroo
  - Possum
  - Nasty the Wasp
  - Misc.
- Keith Scott
  - Keeto, a male mosquito
  - Butterwalk, a grandfatherly caterpillar
  - Atlantis, a Praying Mantis
  - Grasshopper
  - Misc.
- Ashley Ayre as Dot (live-action segments)
- Leaf Nowland as Simon (live-action segments)
- Lucy Charles as Dot and Simon's mother (live-action segments)

== Soundtrack ==
The film features an original soundtrack including several lyrical melodies composed by Guy Gross, John Levine and John Zulaikha, with lyrics by a returning John Palmer. The music for "Queen Ant", "Cockroach" and "Butterfly" was written by Guy Gross, while that for "Spider", "Little Things" and "Work Ant" was written by Levine and Zulaikha. "In the Kangaroo Pouch" by Bob Young also returns in a lyrical form, having last been heard with lyrics in Around the World with Dot (1981).

== Home media ==
Dot and Keeto debuted in the United States on The Disney Channel on September 12, 1986, where it aired until 1993. Dot and Keeto and four other Yoram Gross films were released on VHS by Family Home Entertainment under license from Cori Films Distributors, Ltd. It was later released on DVD (Region 4 format), along with the other Dot films, in 2014.

As seems to be the case with the other Dot films (including the first one), the copyright for Dot and Keeto in the U.S. is unclear despite being released well after the enactment of the Copyright Act of 1976.
