= Dot and the Koala =

- U.S VHS cover
- Directed by: Yoram Gross
- Screenplay by: Greg Flynn; Yoram Gross
- Based on: Dot and the Kangaroo by Ethel Pedley
- Produced by: Yoram Gross
- Starring: Robyn Moore; Keith Scott
- Cinematography: Graham Sharpe
- Edited by: Ted Otton; Ian Spruce; Neil Thumpston
- Music by: Bob Young; John Sangster
- Production company: Yoram Gross Films
- Distributed by: Hoyts Distribution (Australia)
- Release date: June 20, 1985 (Australia)
- Running time: 71 minutes
- Country: Australia
- Language: English

Dot and the Koala is a 1985 Australian animated film by Yoram Gross. It is the third sequel to the 1977 film Dot and the Kangaroo, which in turn was based on the children's book of the same name by Ethel Pedley.

== Plot ==
Dot comes to the aid of her native animal friends, when Bruce the koala tells her of plans to build a massive dam that will destroy their environment, but the local farm animals believe that the creation of the dam will catapult their small country town into the 21st Century. With both sides fighting for what they believe is right, Dot's plans to wipe out the dam are jeopardized by the mayor Percy, a pig and local detectives Sherlock Bones the rat and his offsider, Watson the cat.

== Cast ==
- Robyn Moore as:
  - Dot, a young, perpetually barefoot, red-headed Australian girl who loves animals
  - Sheila, a kangaroo
  - Misc.
- Keith Scott as:
  - Bruce, a koala
  - Mayor Percy, an anthropomorphic pig
  - Sherlock Bones, an anthropomorphic rat, and the local detective
  - Watson, an anthropomorphic cat and Sherlock's assistant
  - Misc.

== Soundtrack ==
The film features an original soundtrack composed mostly by Bob Young and John Sangster, with two songs, "Stop It from Happening!" and "Small Town", being written by Gairden Cooke. This was the first Dot film not to feature any songwriting contributions from John Palmer, although it does feature an instrumental rendition of "In the Kangaroo Pouch" from the first Dot film.

== Production ==
Dot and the Koala debuted in the United States on March 26, 1986, following which its television premiere there took place on The Disney Channel on February 1, 1987, where it aired until 1993. Dot and the Koala and four other Yoram Gross films were released on VHS by Family Home Entertainment under license from Cori Films Distributors, Ltd. It was later released on DVD (Region 4 format), along with the other Dot films, in 2014.

As seems to be the case with the other Dot films (including the first one), the copyright for Dot and the Koala in the U.S. is unclear despite being released well after the enactment of the Copyright Act of 1976.
