= Dot Goes to Hollywood =

1987 Australian film

- Home video release poster
- Directed by: Yoram Gross
- Screenplay by: John Palmer
- Based on: Dot and the Kangaroo by Ethel Pedley
- Produced by: Yoram Gross
- Starring: Robyn Moore; Keith Scott; Barbara Frawley; Ross Higgins
- Edited by: Rod Hay
- Music by: Guy Gross; Bob Young
- Production company: Yoram Gross Films
- Distributed by: Magna Pacific
- Release date: 9 July 1987
- Running time: 73 minutes
- Country: Australia
- Language: English

Dot Goes to Hollywood is a 1987 Australian film directed by Yoram Gross. It was released on DVD (Region 4 format) in 2014. It is the seventh sequel to the 1977 film Dot and the Kangaroo.

== Plot ==
Yoram Gross' eighth Dot movie opens in Australia with Dot and a koala named Gumley dancing and singing in the streets. There is evidence of an epidemic, revealed to be an eye disease, which is spreading fast among the koalas, causing blindness and death. Gumley has contracted the disease, and he and Dot are trying to raise money to pay for an operation, but they are unsuccessful. A kangaroo named Dosey Face suggests that Dot goes to Hollywood, where she will be able to raise the money in no time.

In Hollywood, Dot meets many famous people and goes to an audition, which she hopes will lead to earning some money. During her audition, Gumley is discovered and taken to the zoo. The zoo's vet discovers that Gumley is sick with the disease, but the zoo cannot afford to pay for the operation either.

Gumley is held captive until Dot arrives at the zoo and helps him escape. While hiding in the zoo, Gumley's condition worsens. After Dot wins a contest, the vet agrees to operate on Gumley's eyes. Dot practices her singing while Gumley undergoes surgery. The first operation does not go well, but another procedure in two days later succeeds in curing Gumley.

Gumley returns to Dot during a performance, and they sing together along with other characters.

Footage is featured from the films The New Adventures of Tarzan, Moviestruck, Something to Sing About, Little Princess, and Flying Deuces.

== Cast ==
- Robyn Moore as:
  - Dot, a young, perpetually barefoot, red-headed Australian girl who loves animals
  - Dosey Face, a lazy, good-natured kangaroo
  - Misc.
- Keith Scott as:
  - Gumley, a young increasingly ill koala
  - Grumblebones, a grumpy, pessimistic kangaroo
  - Laurel and Hardy
  - Misc.
- Barbara Frawley - Dot (singing voice)
- Ross Higgins - Misc.

== Soundtrack ==
The film features a mostly original soundtrack composed primarily by Guy Gross, with lyrics written by John Palmer and performed by Robyn Moore, Keith Scott, Barbara Frawley and Ross Higgins. The film's first song, "Happy, Indisputably" (also known as "Why Do We Sing?"), has music composed by Bob Young, while the music for the other original songs – "Limelight", "Hi Dot" and "Does Anybody Care?" – was composed by Guy Gross. Two songs from previous Dot films, both with music composed by Bob Young, are also featured, with "In the Kangaroo Pouch" (now confusingly retitled "Dot and the Kangaroo") appearing in what would end up being the final time where it is heard with lyrics, and "I Love to Walk Around New York" from Around the World with Dot returning as the song performed by Dot during the Hollywood contest.

== Home media ==
International distribution was limited primarily to English-speaking markets. In the United States, particularly, the film premiered on VHS by Family Home Entertainment on 10 August 1989, and received a television premiere on The Disney Channel on 29 July 1990. Since then, it has also seen various releases on DVD, with the most recent such release on that medium taking place in Region 4 in 2014, alongside the other Dot sequels.

As seems to be the case with the other Dot films (including the first one), the copyright for Dot Goes to Hollywood in the U.S. is unclear despite being released well after the enactment of the Copyright Act of 1976.
