= Dot and the Bunny =

- Theatrical release poster
- Directed by: Yoram Gross
- Written by: John Palmer
- Based on: Dot and the Kangaroo by Ethel Pedley
- Produced by: Yoram Gross
- Starring: Barbara Frawley; Robyn Moore
- Cinematography: Douglass Baglin
- Edited by: Christopher Plowright
- Music by: Bob Young; John Sangster
- Production companies: Yoram Gross Films; The Australian Film Commission
- Distributed by: Satori (Australia)
- Release date: 3 April 1983
- Running time: 81 minutes
- Country: Australia
- Language: English

Dot and the Bunny is a 1983 Australian animated film directed by Yoram Gross. It serves as a direct sequel to the 1977 film Dot and the Kangaroo, and is the third installment in the Dot film series. It is also notable for its use of three poems by Banjo Paterson – "Weary Will", "Benjamin Bandicoot" and "Camouflage" – in song form.

== Plot ==
Dot ventures out into the bush, determined to finally locate the little lost joey and reunite him with his mother. On her way, she meets a silly bunny rabbit who tries to convince Dot that he is the joey she is looking for. Dot is delighted by his antics and names her new companion 'Funny Bunny'. Together, they continue the search for the joey. On the way, Dot learns that Funny Bunny is really a very lonely rabbit. His family was killed by hunters and he has been on his own ever since. They find mother kangaroo, and though she has not yet found her joey, when she sees the lonely bunny, she realizes she has found someone else to look after.

== Cast ==
- Barbara Frawley — Dot, a young, perpetually barefoot, red-headed Australian girl who loves animals
- Robyn Moore — Funny Bunny, an orphaned male bunny rabbit
- Drew Forsythe — Koala
- Ron Haddrick
- Anne Haddy
- Ross Higgins
- Anna Quin — Dot (live-action segment)

== Soundtrack ==
The film features an original soundtrack including several lyrical melodies, including an instrumental rendition of "In the Kangaroo Pouch" from the first Dot film, composed by Bob Young with lyrics for four of the film's seven principal songs – "The Kangaroo That Never Grew", "Termites", "Roaming Free" and "The Crocodile Song" – by John Palmer. The lyrics for the other three songs – "Weary Will", "Benjamin Bandicoot" and "Camouflage" – were adapted from poems by Banjo Paterson, with "Weary Will" and "Benjamin Bandicoot" sharing the same title as their source material, and "Camouflage" being based on "The Postman of the Birds". All songs were performed by Barbara Frawley, Ross Higgins and Robyn Moore.

"Weary Will" is inexplicably missing from the 2014 DVD of the film, though remains intact on digital, and some other physical, releases.

== Home media ==
Following its theatrical release in Australia, Dot and the Bunny was made available on home media in various formats, beginning with VHS tapes that extended its reach to international audiences, beginning with a VHS release on Roadshow Home Video in 1984. That same year, on 20 April in the United States, it received its TV premiere on HBO, and was subsequently released on VHS there by Playhouse Video (an imprint of CBS/Fox) the following year. Since then, it has also seen various releases on DVD, with the most recent such release on that medium taking place in Region 4 in 2014, alongside the other Dot sequels.

As seems to be the case with the other Dot films (including the first one), the copyright for Dot and the Bunny in the U.S. is unclear despite being released well after the enactment of the Copyright Act of 1976.
