= Dot and the Smugglers =

- Directed by: Yoram Gross
- Written by: Greg Flynn
- Produced by: Yoram Gross
- Starring: Robyn Moore; Keith Scott; Barbara Frawley; Ross Higgins
- Cinematography: Graham Sharpe
- Edited by: Rod Hay
- Music by: Guy Gross
- Production company: Yoram Gross Studios
- Release date: 4 April 1987
- Running time: 60 minutes
- Country: Australia
- Language: English

Dot and the Smugglers is a 1987 Australian animated film directed by Yoram Gross. It is the sixth sequel to the 1977 film Dot and the Kangaroo, which in turn was based on the children's book of the same name by Ethel Pedley.

== Plot ==
In her latest adventure, Dot and her friends, kids and animals alike, must work together to help ensure that two smugglers (Mr Sprag and Scarface) from a circus do not capture the legendary Bunyip. While doing this, Dot and her friends soon discover that the circus is actually a front for an international wildlife smuggling operation, and go on the warpath, eventually succeeding, after much struggling, in both bringing the operation down and saving the Bunyip himself.

== Cast ==
- Robyn Moore as:
  - Dot, a young, perpetually barefoot, red-headed Australian girl who loves animals
  - The tall, skinny boy from Wilyabrup who becomes one of Dot's human friends
  - Misc.
- Keith Scott as:
  - Bruce the Koala
  - Burra, Dot's kookaburra friend
  - Bruiser and Basher, two boxing kangaroos who Dot and her animal friends rescue from the circus
  - The Bunyip
  - Mr Sprag, the evil circus owner who secretly leads a smuggling ring that is capturing wildlife and selling it on the black market
  - Scarface, Mr Sprag's right-hand man
  - The short, fat boy from Wilyabrup who becomes another of Dot's human friends
  - Misc.
- Barbara Frawley - Dot (singing voice)
- Ross Higgins - Singer

== Songs ==
The film features an original soundtrack composed mostly by Guy Gross, with lyrics written by John Palmer and performed not only by Robyn Moore and Keith Scott, but also by a returning Barbara Frawley and Ross Higgins. The Kangaroo Pouch sequence, with music composed by Bob Young and lyrics by Palmer, also re-appears towards the end of the film.

- Dot in a Pouch
- Circus
- Don't Go Out Tonight
- The Very Best of Friends!
- Birdie Birdie
- Our Submarine
- Animals
- Poachers

== Home media ==
Dot and the Smugglers debuted in the United States on The Disney Channel on June 18, 1987, where it aired until 1993. Dot and the Smugglers and four other Yoram Gross films were released on VHS by Family Home Entertainment under license from Cori Films Distributors, Ltd. It was later released on DVD (Region 4 format), along with the other Dot films, in 2014.

As seems to be the case with the other Dot films (including the first one), the copyright for Dot and the Smugglers in the U.S. is unclear despite being released well after the enactment of the Copyright Act of 1976.
