= Make a Wish =

Make a Wish most commonly refers to the international charity that operates across 50 countries including:

- Make-A-Wish Foundation of America
- Make-A-Wish Australia
- Make A Wish UAE
- Make-A-Wish Foundation UK

Make a Wish may also refer to

== Music ==
- Make a Wish (musical), a 1951 stage musical and soundtrack album
- Make a Wish (Vic Chou album), 2002
- Make a Wish (Kevin Sharp album), 2004
- "Make a Wish", a 2008 song by Charlene Choi
- "Make a Wish", a 2008 song by Flo Rida from Mail on Sunday
- "Make a Wish", a song by Jordan Cahill from the film Stuck in the Suburbs
- "Make a Wish", song by Brian Wilson from Gettin' In Over My Head
- "Make a Wish", song from the English version of the film Pokémon: Jirachi Wish Maker
- "Make A Wish (Birthday Song)", song by NCT U, from NCT 2020 Resonance

== Film and television ==
- Make a Wish (TV series), a children's program airing from 1971 to 1976
- "Make a Wish", episode of 1994 Spider-Man TV series
- Make a Wish (1937 film), a film starring Basil Rathbone
- Make a Wish (2006 film), a short film by Cherien Dabis
- Make a Wish (2011 film), a short film
- Make a Wish (2014 TV series), South Korean television series
- Make a Wish (2025 film), a film by Volfango De Biasi
