= The Three Musketeers (1973 animated film) =

- Genre: Adventure
- Based on: The Three Musketeers by Alexandre Dumas
- Story by: Draper Lewis
- Directed by: William Hanna; Joseph Barbera
- Voices of: James Condon; Neil Fitzpatrick; Barbara Frawley; Ron Haddrick; Jane Harders; John Martin; Richard Meikle
- Countries of origin: Australia; United States
- Original language: English

Production
- Producers: William Hanna; Joseph Barbera
- Running time: 50 minutes
- Production company: Hanna-Barbera Australia

Original release
- Network: CBS
- Release: November 23, 1973

The Three Musketeers is a 1973 animated television special produced by the Australian division of Hanna-Barbera and a remake of the 1968 American Saturday morning cartoon The Three Musketeers, itself based on the 1844 novel of the same name by Alexandre Dumas. It originally aired November 23, 1973 as part of Famous Classic Tales on CBS.

== Plot ==
Anne of Austria is falsely accused by Cardinal Richelieu of being involved in a plot to overthrow her husband, Louis XIII. The King's Musketeers, Athos, Porthos, Aramis and a new recruit named D'Artagnan, attempt to solve the situation.
