= Anne Haddy =

Australian actress, television presenter and voice artist (1930–1999)

- Haddy as Helen Daniels in the television series Neighbours
- Born: Patricia Anne Haddy; 5 October 1930; Quorn, South Australia, Australia
- Died: 6 June 1999 (aged 68); Melbourne, Victoria, Australia
- Occupations: Actress, TV presenter, voice artist
- Years active: 1948–1997
- Known for: Neighbours; Prisoner; Sons and Daughters; Play School
- Spouse(s): Maxwell Dimmitt (1955–1972; divorced); James Condon (m. 2 October 1977)
- Children: 2

Patricia Anne Haddy (5 October 1930 – 6 June 1999) was an Australian actress, television presenter and voice artist who worked in various facets of the industry including radio, stage and television. She was married to actor and scriptwriter James Condon.

She started her career in the early "Golden Days of Radio", where she spent 20 years appearing opposite such stars as Queenie Ashton and Ethel Lang in the Gwen Meredith ABC drama Blue Hills

Haddy appeared in numerous television films early in her career, but was better known for her television soap opera/serials roles, starting with numerous roles in Crawford Production serials. She had a stint in cult series Prisoner as Alice Hemmings and a permanent role in Sons and Daughters as Rosie Andrews.

She was best known, however, for her long-running role in the soap Neighbours as matriarch Helen Daniels for twelve years.

Haddy was also a children's entertainer, as an original presenter on Play School and also a voice artist in some films from the animated Dot series.

== Early life ==
Haddy was born on 5 October 1930, in Quorn, South Australia, the only child of Allan Ross Haddy and Mona Lowas (née Graham). Intent on becoming an actress from a young age, her parents gave her the complete works of Shakespeare for her fifteenth birthday. She attended Gawler Primary School, followed by Adelaide High School, where she acted in a production of George Bernard Shaw's Androcles and the Lion.

== Career ==
=== Early radio and theatre ===
Haddy made her professional radio debut with the Australian Broadcasting Commission (ABC) in 1948. She acted in radio plays and school broadcasts while she was working in the University of Adelaide's book room. By 1949, she was a member of Theatres Associated, playing Ah, Wilderness! under Margery Irving at Stow Hall through to 1953 with Cocteau's The Typewriter. She also appeared in the Adelaide Repertory Theatre's production of Claudia (1950). She later attended the Sydney Theatre Company.

She relocated to the United Kingdom in 1953 to find acting opportunities, and appeared in The Pied Piper at the West End's Adelphi Theatre with the Australian Drama Group, but predominantly worked as a secretary for Kellogg's.

After getting married, Haddy returned to Australia in 1955, settling in Perth. She continued in stage and radio plays, including starring in the titular role in Sophocles' Antigone at the 1957 Festival of Perth. Relocating to Sydney in 1960, she performed in productions for the Independent Theatre, the Q Lunchtime Theatre, and the Community Theatre. One of her most notable stage roles was as Sheila Larkin in a 1967 production of Hostile Witness, alongside Ray Milland, who starred in the film version. By 1971, she was contracted to work for the Old Tote Theatre Company. Other theatre credits include The Entertainer, Hay Fever, The Glass Menagerie, Twelfth Night, Richard III, Gas Light and 'Tis Pity She's a Whore. She also starred as Elizabeth Ross-Ingham in radio serial Blue Hills for more than twenty years.

=== Television and film ===
Haddy became one of the first presenters of Play School. She appeared in the 1966 feature film They're a Weird Mob and numerous made-for-television movies throughout the 1960s. She also had numerous guest roles in serials throughout the 1960s and into the mid-1970s, including Wandjina! (1966), Dynasty (1970–1971), Punishment, Matlock Police (1972–1974), Division 4 (1973), and Certain Women (1974–1975). She also had a guest role in Skippy the Bush Kangaroo. This was followed by a role in cult prison series Prisoner, playing Doreen Anderson's mother, Alice Hemmings, who having abandoned Doreen as a youngster, returns to visit her, revealing she has terminal cancer. Following this, Haddy appeared as American alcoholic worldwide singer entertainer Toni Lee, who finds romance in the VIP Lounge at Pacific International Airport in Skyways.

She had roles in many classic films and miniseries, including Seven Little Australians (1973), The Fourth Wish (1976), Australian New Wave classic Newsfront (1978), and A Town Like Alice (1981). She also performed as a voice artist on the 1977 children's animated film Dot and the Kangaroo and its sequels.

From 1982 to 1985, Haddy played housemaid Rosie Andrews (later Palmer) in Sons and Daughters, before in 1985 taking on her longest and most famous regular role, as series matriarch Helen Daniels, in Neighbours. The role was one she would go on to appear in for 1,162 episodes over 12 years. Haddy departed the series and retired from acting in 1997.

== Personal life and death ==
After relocating to the United Kingdom in the 1950s, Haddy married her first husband, Maxwell "Max" Dimmitt, son of Western Australia's agent-general in London. They married on 2 April 1955 at the Queen's Chapel of the Savoy, Westminster, and returned to Australia a couple of months later, settling in Perth, where she gave birth to two children. In 1960, Haddy and her family moved to Sydney. Her marriage ended in divorce in 1971.

Haddy began dating actor and scriptwriter James Condon in 1974, after having met while working in radio many years prior. They were married on 2 October 1977 in Wahroonga on Sydney's Upper North Shore. The couple moved from Sydney to Melbourne for Haddy's part in Neighbours. They acted alongside each other on television twice, both during Haddy's tenure on Neighbours in 1985 and again in 1995. They also performed on stage together, in a production of Shaw's Arms and the Man.

Haddy suffered ill health for the last two decades of her life. She suffered a heart attack in 1979, leading to a quadruple heart bypass operation. Shortly thereafter, she fell and broke her hip, and later learned she had stomach cancer, which was reportedly discovered early and successfully treated surgically. In 1983, she had one of her four heart grafts of her bypass unclogged (angioplasty). Further health problems and a broken hip led to kidney trouble, which caused her to retire from acting in 1997. Haddy had remarked that she would like to have her real-life funeral screened as part of Neighbours.

She died at her home in Melbourne from a kidney-related illness on 6 June 1999, aged 68. In the UK, the episode of Neighbours that was broadcast on BBC One the following day ended with a dedication to her memory, accompanied by an announcement of her death.

== Awards and honours ==
Year	Work	Award	Category	Result
1977	The Fourth Wish	Australian Film Institute Awards	Best Supporting Actress in Film	Nominated
1987	Neighbours	Penguin Award	Sustained Performance by an Actor in a Series	Won
1988	Anne Haddy	University of Oxford	Honorary member of Corpus Christi College	Honoured

== Filmography ==
=== Film ===
Year	Title	Role	Type
1965	Facing Facts		Film short
1966	They're a Weird Mob	Barmaid	Feature film
1971	Where Dead Men Lie	Mary	Film short
1976	The Fourth Wish	Dr. Kirk	Feature film
1977	Dot and the Kangaroo	Voice	Animated feature film
1978	Newsfront	A.G's Wife	Feature film
1979	Boos And Cheers		Film short
1979	The Little Convict	Lady Augusta Lightfoot (voice)	Animated Feature film
1981	Around the World with Dot	Dozeyface / Angry Mum / Natasha (voices)	Animated feature film
1982	Fighting Back	Magistrate	Feature film
1983	World War II – The Eastern Front	Narrator	Film documentary
1983	Dot and the Bunny	Voice	Animated Feature film

=== Television ===
Year	Title	Role	Type
1961	Waters of the Moon		Teleplay
1961	In Writing		TV film
1962	Consider Your Verdict	Frances Naughton	1 episode
1964	The Four-Poster	Agnes	Teleplay
1964	I Have Been Here Before	Janet Ormund	Teleplay
1964	The Late Edwina Black	Linda Graham	Teleplay
1964	A Season in Hell	Mathilde Verlaine	Teleplay
1965	The Affair	Laura Howard	Teleplay
1966	Cathy Come Home		Teleplay
1966–1970	Play School	Presenter	25 episodes
1967	Wandjina!	Dr. Smith	2 episodes
1967	Divorce Court		1 episode
1968	Hunter	Jane Wilding	1 episode
1968	Skippy		1 episode
1970–1971	Dynasty	Kathy Mason	23 episodes
1970–1973	Homicide	Rita Thomas; Mrs Spencer; Joan Mason	Episodes: "The Jackson File" "From the Top" "Death in the Family"
1972	Behind the Legend	Caroline Chisholm	1 episode
1972	Over There		4 episodes
1972	The Lady and the Law		TV pilot
1972	Crisis		TV pilot
1972; 1974	Matlock Police	Daphne Mitchell; Kitty Hughes	Episodes: "Margaret Styles", "Woman Wanted"
1973	Boney	Mary Parker; Mrs. Cosgrove	2 episodes
1973	Division 4	Maggie Henderson	1 episode
1973	The Evil Touch	Ellen Randall	1 episode
1973	Seven Little Australians	Mrs. Bryant	Miniseries, 1 episode
1974	Three Men of the City	Margaret Styles	3 episodes
1974	Silent Number	Claire Armstrong	1 episode
1974–1975	Certain Women	Barbara	18 episodes
1975	Ben Hall	Eileen	1 episode
1975	The Company Men (season 2 of Three Men of the City)	Margaret Styles	Miniseries
1976	Divisions in Space	Narrator	TV documentary
1976	King's Men		Episode: "The Assassins"
1976	The Alternative	Helen (uncredited)	TV film
1977	No Room to Run	Julie Deakin	TV film
1977	Say You Want Me		TV film
1978	Cass		TV film
1978	Glenview High	Mrs. O'Brien	1 episode
1978	Chopper Squad	Iris Grey	1 episode
1978	Case for the Defence	Mary	1 episode
1978	Micro Macro	Herself	1 episode
1979	A Place in the World		Miniseries, 1 episode
1979	The Restless Years		
1979	Prisoner	Alice Hemmings	5 episodes
1980	Skyways	Toni Lee	1 episode
1980	Cop Shop	Louise Francis	8 episodes
1980	Spring & Fall	Margaret	Episode: "The Silent Cry"
1980	Australian Wildlife – Echidna	Narrator	TV documentary
1981	A Town Like Alice	Aggie Topp	Miniseries, 1 episode
1981	Punishment	Alice Wells	1 episode
1982	A Christmas Carol	Fan (voice)	Animated TV film
1982	1915	Mrs. Gillen	Miniseries, 2 episodes
1982–1984; 1985	Sons and Daughters	Rosie Andrews / Rosie Palmer	273 episodes
1985–1997	Neighbours	Helen Daniels	1661 episodes
1989	A Tribute to Neighbours: Celebrating 1000 Episodes	Herself / Helen Daniels	TV special
1990	The Private War of Lucinda Smith	Mrs. Spencer Grant	Miniseries, 2 episodes
1990	Happy Birthday, Coronation Street	Herself	TV special
1995	Neighbours: A 10th Anniversary Celebration	Herself / Helen Daniels	TV special

== Theatre ==
Year	Title	Role	Type	Ref.
1949	Ah, Wilderness!	Muriel McComber	Stow Hall with Theatres Associated	
1950	Claudia		Adelaide Repertory Theatre	
1951	Hay Fever			
1951	Miranda	Mermaid	Stow Hall with Theatres Associated	
1952	The Life and Death of King John	Blanche of Spain	Tivoli Theatre with Adelaide Repertory Theatre	
1953	The Typewriter	Margot	Stow Hall with Theatres Associated	
	The Pied Piper		Adelphi Theatre, London with Australian Drama Group	
1957	Antigone	Antigone	Perth Festival	
1957	Our Hearts Were Young and Gay		Playhouse, Perth with National Theatre	
1964	The Proposal		Q Theatre	
1966	The Lover		Q Theatre	
1966	The Glass Menagerie	Amanda Wingfield		
1967	Hostile Witness	Sheila Larkin	Tivoli Theatre, Sydney, Princess Theatre, Melbourne	
1967	The Collection	Stella	Q Theatre	
1967	The Workout		Q Theatre	
	Arms and The Man	Louka	Community Theatre, Sydney	
1968	Twelfth Night		Community Theatre, Sydney	
1968	The Entertainer		Community Theatre, Sydney	
1969	Richard III	Lady Anne	Community Theatre, Sydney	
	Fallen Angels		Community Theatre, Sydney	
	Gas Light	Bella	Community Theatre, Sydney	
	Restoration of Arnold Middleton		Community Theatre, Sydney	
1971	The National Health			
1973	'Tis Pity She's a Whore		UNSW Old Tote Theatre	
c.1975	Tchin-Tchin		Community Theatre, Sydney	
1976	The Rainmaker		Marian St Theatre, Sydney	
1976	In Praise of Love		Marian St Theatre, Sydney	
1976	Down Under	Vanessa	Stables Theatre, Sydney	
1977	The Business of Good Government. A Modern Nativity Play		Q Theatre	
1978	Father's Day	Marian	Mayfair Theatre, Sydney	

== Radio ==
Year	Title	Role	Notes	Ref.
1950	Stockade	Bridget as a child		
1950s	Dr Paul		2UW, 2CH Grace Gibson radio series	
1959	Hancock's Half Hour	Helen Bond	BBC radio series on 2FCNA, NA, 4QG and regionals	
1960s	Sound of Thunder	Margaret Enger	Radio series	
1962	A Man Called Peter		Artrasana radio series	
c.1962	Sara Dane	Alison Watson	Grace Gibson radio series	
	Blue Hills	Elizabeth Ross-Ingham	ABC radio series	
	Beyond the Rainbow	Tanya Rylieff	AWA radio series	
1977	A Place in the Sun		4BU radio series	
2008	The Flight		ABC Radio	
