= Dot and the Kangaroo (film) =

- 2001 DVD cover
- Directed by: Yoram Gross
- Written by: Yoram Gross; John Palmer
- Based on: Dot and the Kangaroo by Ethel C. Pedley
- Produced by: Yoram Gross
- Starring: Lola Brooks; Joan Bruce; Barbara Frawley; Peter Gwynne; Ron Haddrick; Ross Higgins; Richard Meikle; Spike Milligan; June Salter
- Edited by: Rod Hay; Klaus Jaritz
- Music by: Bob Young; John Palmer; Marion Von Alderstein
- Production company: Yoram Gross Films
- Distributed by: Hoyts (Australia)
- Release date: 15 December 1977
- Running time: 75 minutes
- Country: Australia
- Language: English
- Budget: A$250,000

Dot and the Kangaroo is a 1977 Australian live-action/animated musical drama film based on the 1899 children's book of the same name by Ethel Pedley.

Directed by Yoram Gross, and starring Barbara Frawley, Joan Bruce, June Salter, Ron Haddrick, Ross Higgins and comedian Spike Milligan, the film was a commercial and critical success, helping draw international attention to the then-emerging Australian animation scene and becoming the first of what would eventually become a series of nine films centered on title character Dot herself.

== Plot ==
In New South Wales, 1884, a barefoot red-haired young girl named Dot wanders away from her home to gather grass from the paddock. She becomes distracted by a lonely rat and gets lost in the Australian bush. A female red kangaroo who has lost her joey befriends Dot by offering her a berry, which helps her understand animals. When they get thirsty, the kangaroo encourages Dot to get into her pouch so they can travel to the waterhole.

At the waterhole, the kangaroo quietly encourages the ducks to not be afraid as humans cannot see them after hours in their shelter. Later at night, Dot and Kangaroo take a rest in the open while Dot's father and his farmhand Jack try to search for her.

The next morning, Kangaroo goes out for a council arrangement and breakfast, while a kookaburra defends Dot from a snake. Dot and Kangaroo attend the Council of Animals to know about Dot's home, but the other animals do not have a recollection of it and advise them to meet the platypuses (both named Ornithorhynchus Paradoxus). A thunderstorm disrupts the meeting, leading Dot and Kangaroo to be escorted to the cave, which is filled with drawings about the bunyip in the billabong.

After a conversation with the platypus to the koala, Dot and Kangaroo encounter an aboriginal tribe. Dot gets caught when she yells upon seeing a member wearing a kangaroo cloak, nearly getting killed. Pursued by a pack of dingoes, a flock of bitterns rescue them by squawking loudly, causing the dingoes to flee and the tribe to believe their sounds to be from a bunyip.

Dot's father becomes sick as he and Jack give up on searching for his daughter. Meanwhile, Kangaroo gets injured, so Dot takes care of her by giving water, feeding flowers, and cleaning her. Dot and Kangaroo arrive at the far side of Echo Mountain, where a willie wagtail appears and guides them to Dot's home. On the way, Dot asks Kangaroo if she can stay with her, but Kangaroo refuses, saying that the bush is her home. After reuniting with her family, Dot becomes concerned about Kangaroo and goes to the fence only to find she has already gone, leading her to tearfully break down crying for her animal friend as the film ends.

== Cast ==
- Barbara Frawley as Dot, a young, perpetually barefoot, red-headed Australian girl
- Joan Bruce as the Kangaroo and Dot's Mother
- Spike Milligan as Mr. Platypus
- June Salter as Mrs. Platypus
- Ross Higgins as Willie Wagtail
- Ron Haddrick as Dot's Father
- Lola Brooks
- Peter Gwynne
- Richard Meikle as Jack the Farmhand, who is possibly Dot's grandfather
- Anne Haddy

== Production ==
Yoram and Sandra Gross wanted to make an Australian animated feature for the world market. They read a series of books before deciding on Dot and the Kangaroo. Two-thirds of the budget was provided by the Australian Film Commission.

The film's backdrop was filmed on location in and around Jenolan Caves and the Warragamba Dam Catchment Area of the Blue Mountains in New South Wales, Australia. Although the film uses many of the same elements as other animated children's musicals involving animals, such as many of the Disney animated films from the U.S., the film is essentially Australian in its use of icons and accents. It also references Indigenous Australian culture in some scenes which depict animation of cave paintings and aboriginal dancing.

== Soundtrack ==
The film featured an original soundtrack including several lyrical melodies composed by Bob Young with lyrics John Palmer, and Marion Von Alderstein, while Bob Young provided additional lyrics, and they were recorded by Maurie Wilmore. A soundtrack album was released in 1982 combined with the soundtrack of Around the World with Dot. The music from Dot and the Kangaroo appears on the B-side.

Around The World With Dot / Dot and the Kangaroo

Soundtrack album by Bob Young
- Released: 1982
- Label: EMI

Side B: Dot and the Kangaroo track listing
No.	Title	Artist	Length
1.	"The Platypus" (Young, Palmer)	Spike Milligan, June Salter	2:07
2.	"Ride in the Pouch of a Red Kangaroo" (Young, Palmer)	Barbara Frawley, Ross Higgins	1:54
3.	"Willie Wagtail" (Young, Palmer)	Ross Higgins	1:47
4.	"The Bunyip's Gonna Get You" (Young, Palmer)	George Assang	3:11
5.	"What Fun You Have When You’re A Frog" (Young, Von Alderstein)		2:04
6.	"All We Ever Do All Day Is Quack" (Young, Palmer)	Nola Lester, Ross Higgins	1:54
7.	"Ballet Sequence" (Young)		2:05
8.	"One Day When I Was Walking" (Young, Palmer)	Barbara Frawley	0:50
9.	"Lullaby (Sleep Little One Sleep)" (Young, Palmer)	Sue Walker	2:01
10.	"Dot's Theme" (Young)		2:10

== Reception ==
The film was a success, being screened around the world and returning its cost within three years. It allowed Yoram Gross to enlarge his production company and market his family films in the U.S. Additionally, the film's use of animation set against photographic backgrounds established the style for many of his later films.

== Release ==
In the 1980s, the first seven films were released on VHS in the U.S., the first one by Magnetic Video, the next two by CBS/Fox Video and the next five by Family Home Entertainment. A DVD version of the first film was released on 30 October 2001 by Hen's Tooth Video. In Australia there is a complete series DVD set of all the Dot films. They were also released on DVD on Digiview Entertainment. One of them is the first film which was released in 2005 by Digiview Productions and re-released in 2006 by Digiview Entertainment. It was then released by TUTM Home Entertainment on 1 November 2009, as the Digiview copies went out-of-print since Digiview's closure. The copyright for the film in the U.S. is unclear despite being released after the enactment of the Copyright Act of 1976.

The various films were shown on the Disney Channel in the late 1980s through the 1990s in the US, and on the Canadian Family Channel.

The most recent DVD release of the Dot films was in Region 4 in 2014.

== Sequels ==
Animation company Yoram Gross Studios followed up the first film with another eight films between 1981 and 1994. The theme behind all of the films in the Dot series is the negative impact of humanity on animal life in nature. The sequels are as follows:

1. Around the World with Dot (1981)
2. Dot and the Bunny (1983)
3. Dot and the Koala (1985)
4. Dot and Keeto (1986)
5. Dot and the Whale (1986)
6. Dot and the Smugglers (1987)
7. Dot Goes to Hollywood (1987)
8. Dot in Space (1994) (Australian release only)

Six films in the series (not including Dot and the Koala, Dot and the Whale, or Dot Goes to Hollywood) were released in a two-disc pack as Dot and her Amazing Adventures by Reel DVD, under the banner Reel Kids.
