= Emmeline M. D. Woolley =

Emmeline Mary Dogherty Woolley (1843 – 18 March 1908), commonly referred to as E. M. Woolley, was an English-born Australian pianist, organist and composer.

== History ==
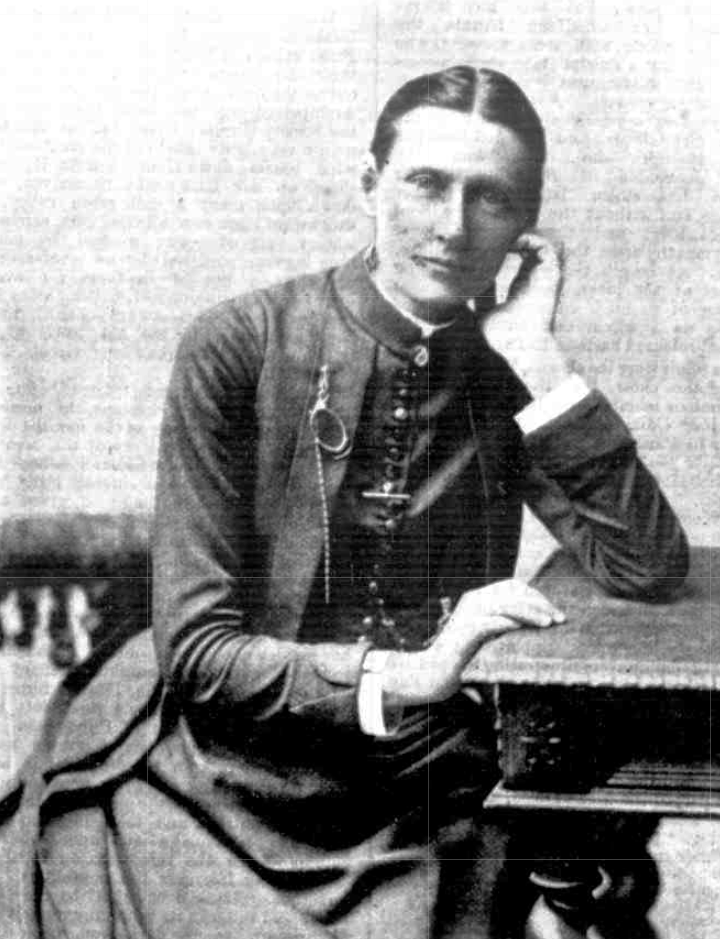
Woolley in 1895

Woolley was born in Hereford, England, eldest of five daughters of Mary Margaret Woolley, née Turner (died 21 September 1886), and her husband John Woolley, who in 1850 was headmaster of King Edward VI Grammar School, Norwich. Blanche Mary Elizabeth Woolley (1845–1906), mother of Freda Du Faur, was a sister.

In 1851 her father was offered a position of inaugural Professor of Logic and Classics and Principal at the University of Sydney, (Note: Sydney University, Australia's first, was inaugurated 11 October 1852.) and in 1852 the family emigrated to Sydney, where their five daughters were educated at home. Woolley was a talented pianist but had little access to high culture in Sydney, so she was sent to Florence, where she became familiar with the masses of Palestrina, Pergolesi and Cherubini. She studied under Alessandro Kraus the Elder (1820–1904), Carlo Duccè (Ducci) and Pietro Romani (1791–1877), later with Julius von Kolb, (Note: Kolb, aka Jules de Kolb, was a student of Franz Liszt and professor at the Conservatory in Munich c. 1853.) from whom she learned much of Liszt's approach to composition and performance. After five years' absence she returned to Sydney.

In 1866 her father died in the sinking of the SS London, leaving the family without a source of income. His friends and colleagues supported his widow with generous contributions, and she liquidated some valuable furniture. Woolley turned to teaching, which she preferred to the concert stage. She also served as organist to St John's Anglican Church, Darlinghurst, and coached the church choral society. She did much to popularize the works of Grieg, also Gounod, Schubert, Spohr, Clara Schumann, Mann, Brahms, and Rubinstein.

=== Ethel C. Pedley ===
In 1882 a close personal and artistic collaboration developed between Woolley and Ethel Pedley, a niece and pupil of Mme Sainton-Dolby, supplying piano accompaniment to Pedley's choir of amateur vocalists who contributed to popular concerts à la "People's Concert" (Note: In England, concerts for the poor, initiated by the Kyrie Society and supported by Henry Leslie, Mme Sainton-Dolby, Lady Folkestone, and other leaders in London music circles.) at the Sydney Sailors' Home. On occasion, Pedley sang in the choir at St John's church, where Woolley was organist, also at concerts in aid of the National Shipwreck Society, of which Woolley was an organiser. And Woolley supported Pedley's various concerts as accompanist, to universal acclaim. In 1885 they toured Europe, attending concerts and visiting conservatories. They were invited to a reception in London for Franz Liszt. They were in London again in 1895–96, when they lobbied the Royal Academy of Music and Royal College of Music to enable their examinations to be held in Australia.

In 1884 or earlier, Pedley founded and, assisted by Woolley, trained the St Cecilia Choir, an all-female society of some 30 members which, apart from benefiting its members, raised funds for charities such as the Sydney City Mission. After ten years, the choir was still going strong, and on 11 June 1895 gave the first public performance of Woolley's cantata The Captive Soul, to text by Pedley, at the Oddfellows' Temple, Elizabeth Street.

They shared a house in Darlinghurst, where Pedley died on 6 August 1898, aged 39. She is remembered today for her book for children, Dot and the Kangaroo, published posthumously.

=== St John's Church ===
Woolley was organist for St John's Anglican Church, Darlinghurst, for 10 years.

In 1880 she suggested moving the organ and choir from the loft to the floor, believing it would result in better singing by the congregation, a presumptuous proposal, some thought. In 1884 she established an Organ Fund, soliciting donations and raising money by concerts. The old (1867) Walker and Sons organ was moved to the Congregational Church, Balmain, that same year and the church enlarged to accommodate the new three-manual Hill and Son organ. It was installed by the Sydney firm of Layton Brothers, and 'opened' by the newly appointed church organist Fred Morley, in August 1886. The papers of the day made no mention of Miss Woolley.

=== Death ===
Woolley died at her home, 27 Upper William Street south, Darlinghurst or North Sydney, (Note: She may have taken the lease on this house in October 1886, shortly after the death of her mother, and was there in August 1890 when she came to the aid of an Italian couple in distressing circumstances.) after months of painful illness, having lost the use of her hands. Following a service at St John's Church, Darlinghurst, her remains were interred at the Waverley Cemetery.

== Compositions ==
The Captive Soul cantata to words by Ethel Pedley.

== Recognition ==
=== Emmeline Woolley Scholarship ===
The Emmeline M. Woolley Scholarship (Note: Not to be confused with the Woolley Scholarship, created in recognition of Dr Woolley the university's first principal.) was a prize awarded triennually through a competition in both music theory and performance on the pianoforte, run by the Associated Board of the Royal Academy of Music and the Royal College of Music of London, England. Funded by public subscription, it paid for tuition at the College in England for three years, valued at £100, later amended to £50 per annum. An applicant had to be a female under 21 years, resident in New South Wales for at least five years. (Note: The recipient was responsible for her own travel expenses, accommodation during school holidays, and expenses attendant on stage appearances. As discussed in Elder Scholarship, this meant the prize was of no use to students from less wealthy families.)

- Kathleen Narelle 1910
- Maggie Chisholm 1913
- Eadith Sullivan 1916
- Kathleen Fitzgerald 1919
- Dorothy Ryan 1922
- Lesley Reynolds 1927
- Edna Boyling 1930
- Dorothy White 1933 or 1934
- Valma Sullivan 1937
- Estelle Peters 1940

No further records have been found.
