= Lionel Williams (TV presenter) =

Lionel Williams (c. 1928 – 7 January 2016) was a television personality in Adelaide, South Australia. He is remembered for hosting Adelaide Tonight in the 1960s. He was a Logie award recipient in 1963.

== History ==
Williams was born and raised in Woodville, South Australia.

In the late 1940s and early 1950s he was active in repertory theatre, a member of Theatres Associated, touring the country areas. Other well-known members were Frank Gunnell, Marjorie Irving (died 2005), Peter Shearer, Anne Haddy, Joyce Bruce, Patricia Lloyd, Ray Taylor, Odell Crowther, David Barnes, Anne Shearer, and Eileen Moran; also of the Adelaide Theatre Group. He received good reviews in both companies. In 1951 he was appointed full-time secretary of the Arts Council of South Australia. When the Arts Council put on As You Like It, Williams's Touchstone was judged "outstanding".

He started his broadcasting career at radio 5KA in 1952, initially as the overnight presenter (5KA was Adelaide's only 24-hour broadcaster). He joined with Bill Evans to call the Speedway races at Rowley Park, on Friday nights December 1952 to March 1953. After moving to the day shift, his duties included community singing, along with Rex Heading and Bob Moore, and in winter the same trio helped run the Saturday evening Football Show, a variety program featuring players from whichever of that day's four SANFL games 5KA had broadcast.

In 1958 he joined NWS Channel Nine; he created and for eight years compered Adelaide Tonight, a variety show broadcast live from Channel Nine studios, Tynte Street, North Adelaide, or from the Hotel Adelaide, nearby. His co-comperes included Kevin Crease and Ernie Sigley. He won his Logie in 1963 as Adelaide's top male television personality.

He left television in 1967 to manage an Adelaide travel agency owned by the network, but returned occasionally to make advertisements and narration work. He had acting parts in several TV drama series: Matlock Police, Homicide and Division 4. He played Mr Peterson in The Fourth Wish (1976), and has been credited (on IMDb) with a part in the short film The Felt Hat (1959).

He later returned to daytime television:

- It's A Woman's World (later The Lionel Williams Show) 1976–1988
- He presented The Golden Years of Hollywood on Channel Seven.
- He co-hosted the daytime quiz show, Concentration, with Joan McInnes (later Lady Joan Hardy).

He died peacefully at Flinders Private Hospital.

== Family ==
Williams married Elizabeth; they had three children:

- Leah Williams (born c. 1956) married Kennedy
- Randal Williams (born c. 1957)
- Stephen Williams (born c. 1959)
