= A Journey to the Center of the Earth (1977 film) =

- Written by: John Palmer; Jules Verne
- Directed by: Richard Slapczynski
- Starring: Ron Haddrick; Alistair Duncan; Bevan Wilson
- Country of origin: Australia

Production
- Running time: 60 minutes

Original release
- Release: 1977

A Journey to the Center of the Earth is a 1977 Australian animated film originally based on the 1864 novel Journey to the Center of the Earth by Jules Verne. It was directed by Richard Slapczynski from a screenplay by John Palmer and produced by Walter J. Hucker.

== Voices ==
- Ron Haddrick
- Alistair Duncan
- Bevan Wilson
- Lynette Curran - Gräuben
- Barbara Frawley - Martha
