= Around the World with Dot =

- Film poster
- Directed by: Yoram Gross
- Screenplay by: John Palmer; Yoram Gross
- Based on: Dot and the Kangaroo by Ethel Pedley
- Produced by: Yoram Gross
- Starring: Drew Forsythe; Ron Haddrick
- Cinematography: Graham Sharpe; Chris Ashbrook; John Barnard
- Edited by: Des Horn; Jennifer Kretzschmar; Christopher Plowright; Collin Waddy
- Music by: Bob Young; John Sangster
- Production company: Yoram Gross Films
- Distributed by: Satori (Australia)
- Release date: 23 June 1981 (Australia)
- Running time: 80 mins
- Country: Australia
- Language: English

Around the World with Dot (also known as Dot and Santa Claus) is a 1981 Australian animated film directed by Yoram Gross and starring Drew Forsythe, Barbara Frawley and Ron Haddrick. It is the first sequel to 1977’s Dot and the Kangaroo.

== Premise ==
Dot joins a swagman named Danny dressed as Father Christmas on a tour of the world to see everyone celebrate Christmas in their own different ways. They search for a lost beloved joey, the child of the kangaroo Dot had met when she lost her way home.

== Cast ==
=== Live action ===
- Drew Forsythe - Danny the Swagman
- Ashley Ayre - Dot (live-action segments)
- Ben Alcott - Ben (live-action segments)
- Frank Gott (live-action segments)
- Marli Mason (live-action segments)

=== Animated ===
- Drew Forsythe as Santa Claus
- Barbara Frawley as:
  - Dot (a young, perpetually barefoot, red-headed Australian girl who loves animals)
  - Zebra
  - French Swallow
- Ron Haddrick as:
  - Grumblebones, a grumpy, pessimistic kangaroo
  - Frog
  - Circus Elephant
  - Tiger
  - British Lion
- Anne Haddy as:
  - Dozey-Face, a lazy, good-natured kangaroo
  - Angry Mother
  - Natasha, a Russian bear
- Ross Higgins as:
  - Reindeer
  - Mr. Nagamora, a Japanese goldfish
  - Kite Judge
  - Ringmaster

== Soundtrack ==
The film features an original soundtrack including several lyrical melodies composed by Bob Young and John Sangster with lyrics by John Palmer. Additional lyrics were provided by Bob Young, and the soundtrack was recorded by Martin Benge. A soundtrack album was released in 1982 combined with the soundtrack of the first Dot film. The music from Around the World with Dot appears on the A-side.

Around The World With Dot / Dot and the Kangaroo

Soundtrack album by Bob Young
- Released: 1982
- Label: EMI

Side A: Around the World with Dot track listing
No.	Title	Artist	Length
1.	"I Love To Walk Around New York" (Young, Palmer)	Drew Forsythe, Barbara Frawley, Ross Higgins	3:43
2.	"Are You Coming To The Circus?" (Young, Palmer)	Drew Forsythe, Barbara Frawley, Ross Higgins	1:01
3.	"You Oughta Do What You Can Do Best" (Young, Palmer)	Drew Forsythe, Barbara Frawley, Ross Higgins	1:49
4.	"Dot In The Sleigh" (Young, Palmer)	Barbara Frawley	2:22
5.	"The Sleigh Song" (Young, Palmer)	Barbara Frawley	2:42
6.	"Easy To Be Lonely" (Young, Palmer)	Barbara Frawley	2:49
7.	"The Real World Of The Circus" (Young, Palmer)	Barbara Frawley	2:44
8.	"Ingenuity" (Young, Palmer)	Drew Forsythe, Barbara Frawley, Ross Higgins	2:16

== Home media ==
Following its theatrical release, Around the World with Dot became available on home video in Australia through VHS tapes distributed by companies affiliated with Yoram Gross Films, including a 1983 edition from Video Classics and a 1987 release from CEL Home Video, while a North American VHS release under its alternative name, Dot and Santa Claus, by CBS/Fox Video not long after its premiere in the United States on 23 October 1982 began the film's reach to international audiences. The film was later picked up by The Disney Channel, where it subsequently aired until 1993. Since then, it has also seen various releases on DVD, with the most recent such release on that medium taking place in Region 4 in 2014, alongside the other Dot sequels.

As seems to be the case with the other Dot films (including the first one), the copyright for Around the World with Dot in the U.S. is unclear despite being released well after the enactment of the Copyright Act of 1976.
