= The Fourth Wish =

- Directed by: Don Chaffey
- Written by: Michael Craig
- Based on: TV series The Fourth Wish by Michael Craig
- Produced by: John Mirros; Jill Robb (associate); Matt Carroll (associate)
- Starring: John Meillon; Robert Bettles
- Cinematography: Geoff Burton
- Music by: Tristram Cary
- Production companies: Galaxy Productions; South Australian Film Corporation
- Release date: 16 July 1976
- Running time: 107 minutes
- Country: Australia
- Language: English
- Budget: AU$240,000 or $270,261

The Fourth Wish is a 1976 Australian family film directed by Don Chaffey based on a three-part 1974 TV drama from the ABC.

== Plot ==
Casey is a simple man living alone with his 12-year-old son Sean in a rented run-down apartment in suburban Adelaide. He works as a machinist in a small factory, making a modest living but is happy to have a job with congenial workmates. His wife, Connie, had left him for another man when Sean was a baby, but Casey pretends to his son that she has a glamorous career in America.

Casey learns that Sean has leukaemia and will die in a few months. Casey stubbornly refuses to accept the inevitable, and mentions it to nobody. He quits his job, giving no reason, not wishing to elicit sympathy, and devotes himself to making his son happy. They attend John Martin's Christmas Pageant and ride paddle boats on Torrens Lake. He offers to fulfill three wishes; Sean requests: to own a dog, be reunited with his mother, and meet the Queen, who was visiting Australia en route to the Commonwealth Games.

Acquiring the dog, a playful "bitser" from the pound, is easy. But keeping a dog in the apartment is prohibited, and when the landlord threatens eviction Casey gets help with delaying tactics from a lawyer.

Finding Sean's mother is problematical: she is a serial monogamist, and also a compulsive drinker. Casey tracks her down and persuades her to act the part for one day. At first it seems she has failed and Casey fabricates a cover story, but then she appears and plays the part magnificently; at the end of the day they farewell her at the airport. She slips away to a waiting taxi while the plane takes off.

Casey blusters his way into Government House in an attempt to arrange an audience with the Queen, and is rebuffed, but Jenny, a newspaper journalist, becomes interested in the story and arranges for Sean to be among the patients of St Margaret's Rehabilitation Hospital (Note: Though the Queen's visit is a fiction, St Margaret's is, or was, a real-life convalescent centre at 65 Military Road, Semaphore.) which the Queen was scheduled to visit. When Sean recounts the events, he grants his father a fourth wish, which is not revealed, but is presumably peace and resignation.

== Cast ==
- John Meillon as James Casey
- Robert Bettles as Sean
- Michael Craig as Dr Richardson
- Anne Haddy as Dr Kirk
- Ron Haddrick as Harbord
- Robyn Nevin as Connie (Note: Noeline Brown played Connie in the 1974 mini-series on which this film was based. Meillon here reprises his role as Casey in the original, with Mark Shields-Brown as Sean; other parts are not so easy to pin down. Harrison mentions Barbara Frawley and Judi Farr, while Moran also mentions Barry Hill and Joe James but not the parts they played.)
- Julie Hamilton as Jenny
- Brian Anderson as Wally
- Julie Dawson as Hannah
- Edwin Hodgeman as Simms (as Ted Hodgeman)
- Norman Yemm as Specialist
- Brian James as Jarvis
- Don Crosby as Priest
- Fred "Cul" Cullen as Patcheck
- Gordon McDougall as Policeman
- Dennis Olsen as Ross
- Jo England as Day Nurse
- Les Foxcroft as Pat

Lionel Williams, an Adelaide television personality, had a cameo part, as Mr Peterson; Audrey Stern was Mrs Peterson. Also mentioned in the credits were Marilyn Allen as Matron, Mark Lawrence as Boy on Dodgem, Ann Peters as Rent-a-Car Girl and Moishe Smith as "Roger".

== Awards ==
Meillon won the 1977 AFI Award for Best Actor for his part in this film.

== Home media ==
The 1976 (Moran has 1983) film The Fourth Wish was released on DVD by Rainbow Products Cat. RDVD9719

== Television miniseries ==
The Fourth Wish
- Written by: Michael Craig
- Directed by: Eric Taylor
- Starring: John Meillon; Mark Shields-Brown; Noeline Brown; Barbara Frawley; Judi Farr; Barry Hill; Joe James
- Country of origin: Australia
- Original language: English
- No. of episodes: 3 x 75 mins

Original release
- Network: ABC
- Release: 11 July 1974

The original miniseries aired in 1974. John Meillon won a Best Actor Logie for his performance.

== Production ==
John Meillon had appeared in the TV show. He then formed Galaxy Productions with Michael Craig and Don Chaffey, to make the movie.

Shooting began in Adelaide in November 1975 with Robert Bettles replacing Mark Shields as Sean.

== See also ==
- Cinema of Australia
