= A Christmas Carol (1982 film) =

1982 Australian made-for-television animated film

- Title card
- Genre: Fantasy
- Based on: A Christmas Carol by Charles Dickens
- Screenplay by: Alexander Buzo
- Story by: Charles Dickens
- Directed by: Jean Tych
- Starring: Ron Haddrick; Phillip Hinton; Sean Hinton; Barbara Frawley; Robin Stewart; Liz Horne; Bill Conn; Derani Scarr; Anne Haddy
- Theme music composer: Neil Thurgate
- Country of origin: Australia
- Original language: English

Production
- Producer: Eddy Graham
- Editor: Peter Siegl
- Running time: 75 minutes
- Production company: Burbank Films Australia

Original release
- Network: Nine Network
- Release: 22 December 1982

A Christmas Carol is an Australian made-for-television animated Christmas fantasy film from Burbank Films Australia as part of the studio's series of Charles Dickens adaptations from 1982 to 1985. It was originally broadcast in 1982 through the Australian Nine Network. Based on Charles Dickens' classic 1843 English story, A Christmas Carol, the adaptation by Alexander Buzo was produced by Eddy Graham and directed by Jean Tych.

== Plot ==
Old Ebenezer Scrooge is a cruel man for whom money has become life's only passion; he hates Christmas, even the very mention of it, lives alone and only to work. He is very strict with his sole underpaid, overworked employee, Bob Cratchit, and does not believe in donating to charity or showing kindness to anyone.

One Christmas Eve, Ebenezer Scrooge receives a ghostly visit from his former partner Jacob Marley, who had died on that date seven years earlier. In his life, Jacob Marley had been just as selfish and uncaring as Scrooge was now. He tells Ebenezer about how his soul has not had a moment's rest since his death and how his spirit has been doomed to wander the earth looking down at what might have been, had he been a different man. He tells Scrooge that he wants to spare him that same fate and that he will receive the visits of three other spirits that night.

As Jacob Marley had predicted, the first spirit, the Ghost of Christmas Past arrives at one o'clock. He and Scrooge depart together for the Christmases that have already been and, from the experience, Scrooge gains a painful memory of the person he was, and how he became who he is.

The second spirit, the Ghost of Christmas Present, shares with Scrooge the Christmases being celebrated on that same year, especially the merriment being had at his nephew Fred's home; Fred had invited him to dinner and Scrooge, as usual, had declined the invitation. From this experience, Scrooge also learns about Bob Cratchit's family, and how his youngest son, Tiny Tim, is a fragile creature supported by a crutch who may be doomed to die unless he receives better nourishment, more than his father can provide.

Finally, Scrooge receives a visit from the Ghost of Christmas Yet to Come, and finds himself a changed man after he learns of the cruel fate in store for Tiny Tim, as well as the even crueller fate reserved for himself. Tiny Tim would die and be mourned by his loving family, while Ebenezer Scrooge would die alone and unmourned.

Spared by the spirit, Ebenezer Scrooge wakes up on Christmas Day determined to keep the promise he had made to the spirits the night before and, before setting off to accept his nephew's invitation and join them for dinner, he has a large turkey delivered to Mr. Cratchit's door. From that day, no one in London would know how better to celebrate Christmas than Ebenezer Scrooge—and Tiny Tim could wish for no more a caring friend.

== Cast ==
- Ron Haddrick as Ebenezer Scrooge
- Phillip Hinton as Bob Cratchit
- Sean Hinton as Tiny Tim Cratchit and Peter Cratchit
- Barbara Frawley as Emily Cratchit
- Robin Stewart as Fred, Ghost of Christmas Past, Child Scrooge and Turkey Fetcher
- Liz Horne as Martha Cratchit and Belinda Cratchit
- Bill Conn as Jacob Marley, Solicitors, Schoolmaster, Mr. Fezziwig, Ghost of Christmas Present, Mr. Topper, and Old Joe
- Derani Scarr as Fred's Wife and Belle
- Anne Haddy as Fan

== See also ==
- List of Christmas films
- List of ghost films
- Adaptations of A Christmas Carol
