= Greg Flynn =

Australian novelist

- Greg Flynn in 2005
- Born: Perth, Western Australia
- Occupation: Novelist
- Writing career
- Notable work: The Berlin Cross

Greg Flynn is an Australian novelist whose debut book The Berlin Cross (published by Random House Australia & NZ) received positive reviews nationally when released in December 2005.

Greg is now the co-host of the YouTube and podcast series "The Shiver Show" https://www.youtube.com/watch?v=yjm330r1CpM and https://podcasts.apple.com/au/podcast/the-shiver-show/id1559400097 and https://www.buzzsprout.com/1187597

Additionally, "The Shiver Show" is broadcast on Radio KPPQ, Ventura, California: https://capsmedia.org/podcasts/the-shiver-show

Greg also hosts his own podcast: "Mr Wolf Presents: My Wicked Guide to Life & Modern Fairy Tales" on YouTube, Apple Podcasts and Spotify: https://www.youtube.com/channel/UCwRgqTwWFhKHuIcoA7YDhLA

His series of short stories "Random Acts of Writing" can be found at: https://gfflynn.blogspot.com.au/

== Background ==
Flynn was born in Perth, Western Australia, and joined WA Newspapers' afternoon newspaper "The Daily News" as a cadet reporter.

After a career in journalism in Australia and the UK, he began writing film scripts for the Yoram Gross Film Studios in Sydney.

He then moved into public relations, before writing his first novel, "The Berlin Cross", in 2005.

== Reviews of The Berlin Cross ==
"Flynn hardly puts a foot wrong in this exciting debut novel, which moves at brisk pace through a nicely labyrinthine plot full of rich authentic detail and witty dialogue. A very impressive and highly entertaining read." - Canberra Times

“Greg Flynn's debut novel is a first-rate historical crime thriller. It understands implicitly what most readers want from the genre: a tightly written, well-plotted page-turner with more than enough twists and turns to keep you absorbed.” - The Age

"He is good at the furtive, frantic atmosphere of this genre" - Weekend Australian

With the Berlin Airlift as a dramatic backdrop, Flynn's novel features a Royal Military Police officer and a New York private eye who are forced to team up to find the missing Cross of Jesus Christ.

In The Berlin Cross, fictional characters interact with such historical figures as Nazi architect Albert Speer.

== Scriptwriting ==
Flynn's scriptwriting credits include:

- Epic (1984)
- Dot and the Koala (1985)
- Dot and the Smugglers (1987)
