= The Late Edwina Black (TV play) =

1964 Australian television play

- Genre: Mystery
- Based on: A play by: William Morum; William Dinner
- Written by: Noel Robinson
- Country of origin: Australia
- Original language: English

Production
- Running time: 60 mins
- Production company: ABC

Original release
- Network: ABC
- Release: 23 September 1964

The Late Edwina Black is a 1964 Australian television play, filmed in Sydney. It was based on a play by William Morum and William Dinner which had been filmed numerous times before. It was adapted by Noel Robinson. The play was first broadcast on 23 September 1964 in Melbourne, 16 September 1964 in Sydney, and on 7 October 1964 in Brisbane.

== Plot ==
At Amberwood, a country estate not far from London, Edwina Black has been murdered with arsenic and lies in a coffin. Several people could be suspects including her husband Gregory, his spinster lover Linda, and elderly housekeeper Ellen. Inspector Grey investigates. The love between Linda and Gregory explodes into tension.

== Cast ==
- Anne Haddy as Linda Graham
- Ron Haddrick as Gregory Black
- Ethel Gabriel as Ellen
- John Grey as Inspector Martin of Scotland Yard

== Production ==
The play had been performed numerous times on stage in Australia and had been adapted for radio on several occasions, most recently in 1960. The play had also been turned into a British film in 1951.

ABC designer Jack Montgomery found two 70 year old dresses in a house in Ashfield.

== Reception ==
The Canberra Times said "everyone involved was at the peak of their form, from the anonymous member of the Drama department responsible for selecting such a completely worthless and unimportant murder mystery, up to the producer, designer and splendid cast who were able to make of it an enjoyable, if thoroughly unmemorable, hour of viewing."
