= La Machine à écrire =

La Machine à écrire is a three-act play written by French dramatist Jean Cocteau, premiered on 29 April 1941 at the Théâtre Hébertot in Paris.

It has been translated into English as The Typewriter by Ronald Duncan.

== Original cast ==
- Fred Jacques Baumer
- Didier Louis Salou
- Pascal Jean Marais
- Maxime Jean Marais
- Solange Gabrielle Dorziat
- Margot Michèle Alfa
- Postmistress Jandeline
