= Divorce Court (Australian TV series) =

- Genre: Legal drama
- Written by: Marcia Hatfield; Marion Dreyer; Francis Dunn; Margaret Dunn; Lynne Foster
- Directed by: Bill Eve
- Starring: Sue Condon; Ron Haddrick; Nigel Lovell; John Morgan
- Country of origin: Australia
- Original language: English
- No. of episodes: 210

Production
- Producers: Mary Nelson; Robert Peach
- Running time: 30 minutes

Original release
- Release: 6 February 1967

Divorce Court is a 1967 Australian television series made by NLT Productions. Drama series featuring re-enactments of real-life cases heard in a divorce court.

== Cast ==
- Sue Condon
- Ron Haddrick
- Nigel Lovell
- John Morgan
- Lorraine Bayly
