= Make A Wish UAE =

- Mission statement: "To grant the wishes of children with life-threatening medical conditions"
- Type of project: Non-profit organization
- Location: Abu Dhabi, UAE
- Established: 2003
- Website: www.makeawish.ae

Make-A-Wish UAE is charity organization in the United Arab Emirates that grants the wishes (experiences) of children with life-threatening medical conditions. Make-A-Wish UAE is an affiliate of Make-A-Wish Foundation.

== Awards ==
- Winner of "Local Foundation of the Year" at the Middle East Philanthropy Awards 2013
