= Barbara Frawley =

Australian actress

- Born: Barbara Anne Frawley; 14 April 1935; Australia
- Died: 1 March 2004 (aged 68); Sydney, New South Wales, Australia
- Occupations: Actress; children's host
- Years active: 1957–1992

Barbara Anne Frawley (14 April 1935 – 1 March 2004) was an Australian actress.

She was best known as the voice of young Dot in the 1977 film adaptation of Dot and the Kangaroo, as well as Around the World with Dot and Dot and the Bunny. Apart from the films she appeared in with the Yoram Gross Film Studios, she mainly appeared in cameo and additional voiceover roles.

== Biography ==
Frawley originally was a radio actress in the late 1950s with the ABC, appearing on The Children's Session before moving to television, where she appeared in the 1967 TV drama series, Contrabandits and in the 1970s in The Link Men, Spyforce and Homicide. Frawley also appeared on episodes of the Australian children's television show, Play School.

Frawley went on to provide the voices for many characters in various Australian animated films and television movies, mainly for Yoram Gross Film Studios, most notably in Dot and the Kangaroo and most recently in The Camel Boy. Frawley, late of North Bondi, died in Sydney on 1 March 2004.

== Filmography ==
- Dot Goes to Hollywood (1987)
- Dot and the Smugglers (1987)
- The Adventures of Huckleberry Finn (1984) – Additional voices
- The Camel Boy (1984) – Additional voices
- Dot and the Bunny (1983) – Dot
- Great Expectations (1983) – Additional voices
- A Christmas Carol (1982) – Additional voices
- Oliver Twist (1982) – Additional voices
- Around the World with Dot (1981) – Dot
- The Little Convict (1979) – Polly
- Dot and the Kangaroo (1977) – Dot
- A Journey to the Center of the Earth (1977) – Additional voices
- Moby Dick (1977) – Additional voices
- Silent Night, Holy Night (1976) – Additional voices
- The Black Arrow (1973) – Additional voices
- The Three Musketeers (1973) – Additional voices
- The Count of Monte Cristo (1973) – Additional voices
- The Swiss Family Robinson (1972) – Additional voices
- The Prince and the Pauper (1972) – Additional voices

== Television series filmography ==
- Play School (1980-1992) - Presenter
- The Fourth Wish (TV Miniseries) (1976)
- The Twelve Gifts (TV Special) (1974)
- Number 96 (1973) - Nursing Sister
- Behind the Legend (TV Series) (1972)
- Spyforce (1972) - Mrs. Wilson
- Woobinda, Animal Doctor - Ms. Webber
- The Link Men (1970) - Carol Johnson
- Contrabandits (1967) - Cisca
- Homicide (1966-1972) - Val Charter
- Consider Your Verdict (1961) - Mary Ann Harmon
