= Ron Haddrick =

Australian cricketer and actor (1929–2020)

Ron Haddrick AM MBE
- Ron Haddrick on stage with Ruth Cracknell
- Born: Ronald Norman Haddrick; 9 April 1929; Adelaide
- Died: 11 February 2020 (aged 90); Sydney
- Occupations: Actor; narrator; cricketer
- Years active: 1949–2019
- Children: Lynette Haddrick; Greg Haddrick

Ronald Norman Haddrick AM MBE (9 April 1929 – 11 February 2020) was an Australian actor, narrator and South Australian cricketer. In 2012, he received the Actors Equity Lifetime Achievement Award for his long and distinguished career in media, spanning some seventy years both locally and also in Britain. He appeared in many Shakespearean roles and often performed with theatre actress Ruth Cracknell.

At the time of this Lifetime Achievement Award, playwright David Williamson said, "Ron Haddrick was chosen for two reasons. He's a great actor, definitely one of the greatest of his generation, and also a great human being who has enriched the lives of countless Australians through his acting. He has also enriched the lives of many of us who work in the theatre because of his dedication and palpable decency."

In presenting the award, actor John Bell said Haddrick's "career has been extraordinary ... he is undoubtedly one of the leading lights in the Australian acting industry and he is much loved, admired and respected, because of both his professionalism and his good nature." On news of his death, Bell Shakespeare said: “a legend of Australian theatre ... it was a privilege to have him grace our stage”.

== Family ==
Haddrick was born in Adelaide, South Australia, the only son of Olive May (née Gibson) and Alexander Norman Haddrick. Haddrick's wife, Lorraine, received the Australian Sports Medal in 2000 for her "outstanding dedication to athletics as a volunteer official for 32 years". They had two children: NIDA graduate Lynette Haddrick and screenwriter and producer Greg Haddrick, and three grandchildren, Taya, Milly and Jack Haddrick.

In 2011 three generations of the Haddrick family were involved in the production of the Australian miniseries Cloudstreet. Ron Haddrick was the narrator, Greg Haddrick was a producer, and Mille Haddrick was an actor.

== Cricket career ==
As a sportsman Haddrick played first-class cricket during the 1950s, representing South Australia on three occasions in the Sheffield Shield competition.

== Professional acting career ==
=== Theatre ===
Haddrick first appeared on the stage in 1949 at the Adelaide Tivoli Theatre. Later, he was invited to join the Stratford Memorial Theatre (now the Royal Shakespeare Theatre). During five seasons in Stratford-upon-Avon he performed with Laurence Olivier, Vivien Leigh, John Gielgud, Peggy Ashcroft and Michael Redgrave.

On his return to Sydney, he gained roles with the Trust Players. After the Old Tote Theatre Company formed, Haddrick played in more than forty productions.

=== Radio and television ===
Haddrick has worked extensively in radio and TV throughout his career, notably for the Australian Broadcasting Corporation. He made an early television appearance in the 1960 television play Close to the Roof. He had his first starring TV role as Dr William Redfern in The Outcasts. He later appeared as the alien "Adam Suisse" in G K Saunders' pioneering children's science fiction series The Stranger, broadcast on the ABC in 1964–65. In 1969 and again in 1982, he voiced Ebenezer Scrooge for two Australian-produced adaptations of A Christmas Carol. He worked along the same lines in the Australian animation field in 1977 with a shorter version of Jules Verne's Journey to the Center of the Earth.

=== Narrator ===
Haddrick also narrated six audio books of the British children's TV series Thomas the Tank Engine & Friends, released by ABC For Kids. These were written by Christopher Awdry and illustrated by Ken Stott.

Haddrick is also known for having narrated all audio books of the Australian children's/young adult fantasy book series Deltora Quest, written by Emily Rodda.

=== Selected stage work ===
Other stage work in the 70s and 80s included major roles for Sydney Theatre Company, State Theatre Company of South Australia and Queensland Theatre Company in classics and new Australian plays. He also played extensive seasons of the Nimrod Theatre Company production of The Club. Haddrick received two of the now defunct "Sydney Theatre Critics Circle Awards" for his performances in Long Day's Journey into Night and I'm Not Rappaport.

In the 1990s he played many roles for Marian Street Theatre and the STC, including King Lear and Wacka Dawson in The One Day of the Year.

Haddrick appeared in Australian-made television from Certain Women and Heartbreak High to Farscape and in numerous feature films. Haddrick also played on The Lost Islands, as the tyrant "Q", a 200-year-old ruler. On radio, he has performed in hundreds of dramas, documentaries, and special features. He was frequently heard reading poetry for the ABC.

== Haddrick and Cracknell ==
In 1960 Haddrick appeared at the Adelaide Festival of Arts in a production of Murder in the Cathedral in Bonython Hall. It marked the start of a long working partnership between Haddrick and Ruth Cracknell. In 1970 they performed in Sophocles' Oedipus Rex. It was directed for the Old Tote in Sydney by Sir Tyrone Guthrie and toured widely. In 1973 Haddrick, Ruth Cracknell, Gordon Chater, and Garry McDonald appeared at the Australian Theatre in Newtown in a miscellany called Aurora Australis. They were in the Old Tote's production of David Williamson's What If You Died Tomorrow? in 1974; it toured Australia and played in London at the Comedy Theatre. In the late 1970s, they were in two Peter Williams' productions at the Theatre Royal, Sydney, Bedroom Farce and The Gin Game.

In 1983 Haddrick and Cracknell played the theatrical Mr and Mrs Crummles in Richard Wherrett's production of David Edgar's two-part Dickens marathon, The Life and Adventures of Nicholas Nickleby for the Sydney Theatre Company. This played at the Theatre Royal in Sydney and the State Theatre in Melbourne. In 1990 they were reunited in A.R. Gurney's Love Letters for the Sydney Theatre Company.

== Death ==
Long thought lost for 55 years, the series "The Stranger" was remastered and made publicly available by the ABC in 2020. Haddrick was able to watch the first episode again with his family as he lay dying. His pleasure at recounting his memories of the episode reportedly brought great joy to him and his family.

Haddrick died at home at age 90 in Sydney surrounded by his wife and family on 11 February 2020. A memorial service was held at The Parade Theatre at NIDA on 1 March 2020. Speakers included his daughter Lyn, his granddaughter Millie, his son Greg, actors Kirrily Nolan and Peter Carroll AM, directors Aubrey Mellor OAM and John Bell AO OBE and former Australian cricket captain Ian Chappell.

== Honours ==
- In 1974 he was made a Member of the Order of the British Empire (Civil Division) – For services to the Arts.
- In 1977 he received the Queen Elizabeth II Silver Jubilee Medal.
- In 2012 he was awarded an Actors Equity Lifetime Achievement Award – for a lifetime combining a phenomenal career with generous leadership and selfless mentorship presented by Actors Equity Australia.
- In 2013 he was made a Member of the Order of Australia (General Division) – For significant service to the performing arts as an actor and narrator.

== Filmography ==
=== Film ===
Year	Title	Role	Type
1955	Othello		TV movie
1960	Close to the Roof	Joe Collon	TV movie
1962	Reunion Day	Dave Rubin	TV movie
1962	The Case of Private Hamp	Padre	TV movie
1962	The Taming of the Shrew	Petrecio	TV movie
1963	A Dead Secret	Frederick Dyson	TV movie
1963	The Tempest	Alonso	TV movie
1964	The Late Edwina Black	Gregory Black	TV movie
1965	The Big Killing	Gavin Cole	TV movie
1965	The Sweet Sad Story of Elmo and Me	Dig	TV movie
1965	The Affair	Skefflington	TV movie
1965	Tartuffe	Tartuffe	TV movie
1969	A Christmas Carol	Mr. Scrooge (voice)	
1970	Chequerboard	Oedipus	
1970	A Connecticut Yankee in King Arthur's Court	Voice artist	TV movie
1971	The Legend of Robin Hood	Sheriff of Nottingham (voice)	Animated TV movie
1971	Treasure Island	Voice artist	Animated TV movie
1972	Robinson Crusoe	Voice artist	Animated TV movie
1972	The Prince and the Pauper	Voice artist	Animated TV movie
1972	Travels of Marco Polo	Voice artist	Animated TV movie
1973	The Taming of the Shrew	Baptista	TV movie
1973	The Count of Monte Carlo	Voice artist	Animated TV movie
1973	Kidnapped	Voice artist	Animated TV movie
1973	The Swiss Family Robinson	Voice artist	Animated TV movie
1973	Twenty Thousand Leagues Under the Sea	Voice artist	Animated TV movie
1973	The Three Musketeers	Voice artist	Animated TV movie
1973	The Black Arrow	Voice artist	Animated TV movie
1973	The Gentleman of Titipu	Voice artist	Animated TV movie
1975	The Golden Cage	Rich Man	
1975	The Mysterious Island	Voice artist	TV movie
1976	The Fourth Wish	Harbard	Feature film
1976	Master of the World	Voice artist	Animated TV movie
1976	The Haunting of Hewie Dowker		TV movie
1977	Dot and the Kangaroo	Father (voice)	Animated TV movie
1977	Moby Dick	Voice artist	Animated TV movie
1978	The Death Train	Dr. Rogers	Feature film
1978	The Scalp Merchant		TV movie
1979	Dawn!	Pop	TV movie
1979	The First Christmas	Voice artist	Animated TV movie
1979	The Adventures of Sinbad	Voice artist	Animated TV movie
1979	Off on a Comet	Voice artist	Animated TV movie
1979	From the Earth to the Moon	Voice artist	Animated TV movie
1981	Dot and Santa Claus (aka Around the World With Dot)	– Grumblebones (voice): Frog; Circus Elephant; Tiger; British Lion	Animated TV movie
1981	Run, Rebecca, Run	Speaker of Parliament	Feature film
1982	Sarah and the Squirrel	Voice artist	Animated TV movie
1982	Runaway Island		TV movie
1982	A Christmas Carol	Ebenezer Scrooge (voice)	TV movie
1983	Dot and the Bunny	Voice artist	Animated TV movie
1983	The Amorous Dentist		Film
1983	Butler		TV movie
1983	Sherlock Holmes and the Valley of Fear	Voice artist	Animated TV movie
1983	Sherlock Holmes and the Sign of Four	Voice artist	Animated TV movie
1983	Sherlock Holmes and the Baskerville Curse	Voice artist	Animated TV movie
1983	Sherlock Holmes and a Study in Scarlet	voice artist	Animated TV movie
1984	The Camel Boy	Captain O'Connell	Film
1984	A Halo of Athuen	The Abbott	TV movie
1985	Nicolas Nickelby	Voice artist	Animated TV movie
1986	Short Changed	Garrick	
1986	The Hunchback of Notre Dame	Frollo (voice)	Animated TV movie
1987	Great Expectations: The Untold Story	Tankarton	TV movie
1987	The Odyssey		TV movie
1987	Rob Roy	Voice artist	Animated TV movie
1988	Hiawatha	Voice artist	Animated TV movie
1990	Quigley Down Under	Grimmelman	Feature film
1996	Children of the Revolution	Sir Arthur Miles	Feature film
2000	Beware of Greeks Bearing Guns	Thomas	
2000	Dogwoman: Dead Dog Walking	Barry Holloway	TV movie
2006	The Story of Bubble Boy	Narrator	
2008	The Informant	Tom	TV movie
2010	Size Thirteen	Voice artist	Short film
2011	Codgers	Jimmie McMurtrie	Feature film
2013	Bad Blood	Edgardo	Short film
2014	Locks of Love	Harrold	
2015	To My One and Only		

=== Television ===
Year	Title	Role	Type
1961	The Outcasts	Dr. William Redfern	TV miniseries
1963	Jonah	Governor	TV series
1963–64	Tribunal	– Marcus Brutus: John Brown	TV series
1964	The Stranger	– The Stranger: Adam Suisse	TV series
1967–68	Divorce Court		TV series
1968	Hunter	Bryant	TV series
1968	Contrabandits	– George Payne: Dallas	TV series
1969	Riptide	Abraham Decker	TV series
1971	You Say the Word	English Language Presenter	TV series
1971	The Godfathers	Painless Plunket	TV series
1971	Dynasty	Sir Walter Tasker	TV series
1972	Barrier Reef	Doctor Sedgwick	TV series
1975	Silent Number	John Stanford	TV series
1975	Shannon's Mob	Pellini	TV series
1965–76	Homicide	5 roles: Max Goodwin; Geoffrey Gibson; Alan Byrant; Henry Curtin; Gordon Lovejoy	TV series
1976	Luke's Kingdom	Wicker	TV series
1977	The Restless Years	Greg Dening	TV series
1982	Jonah		TV miniseries
1984	A Country Practice	Ralph Harrison	TV series
1985	Mother and Son	Claude Price	TV series
1986	Tusatala	Thomas Stevenson	TV miniseries
1986	Sons and Daughters	Bill Appleby	TV series
1988	Emma: Queen of the South Seas	Reverend Brown	TV miniseries
1994	The Ferals	Presenter	TV series
1989–94	G.P.	– Joris Volmer: Lloyd Freith	TV series
1988–96	Home and Away	– Gordon Macklin: Peter Moss	TV series
1997	Fallen Angels	Cec Fowler	TV miniseries
1999	Carnavale	Voice	
1997–99	Heartbreak High	– Magistrate: Arthur	TV series
1999	Water Rats	Felix Freidman	TV series
2000	The Lost World	Bergin	TV miniseries
2004	The Alice	Marco Marion	TV series
2004	Farscape: The Peacekeeper Wars	Yondalao	TV series
2002–05	All Saints	– Jack Leyland: Bill Roddick	TV series
2006	Nightmares & Dreamscapes: From the Stories of Stephen King	Man in Lift	TV miniseries
2009	Underbelly	Bertie	TV series
2011	Cloudstreet	Narrator	TV miniseries
2014	Rake	Judge Velez	TV series
