= Make-A-Wish Australia =

Australian children's charity

- Formation: 29 November 1985; 40 years ago
- Type: Nonprofit
- Legal status: Registered with the ACNC
- Headquarters: Richmond, Victoria, Australia
- Region served: Australia
- Services: Wish-Granting
- Chief Executive: Sally Bateman
- Website: https://makeawish.org.au/

Make-A-Wish Australia ("Make-A-Wish Foundation of Australia") is a registered Australian children's charity founded in 1985. The charity grants wishes to children living with a life-threatening disease or medical condition and is affiliated with Make-A-Wish Foundation International.

The charity operates from donations and receives no government funding.

== History ==
Make-A-Wish Australia was founded on 26 November 1985, inspired by the story of Christopher Greicius – a young boy fighting leukaemia in United States fulfilling his wish of becoming a police officer. The first wish to be granted in Australia was for Shawn Cleland, a 16-year-old boy living with Duchenne muscular dystrophy, who wished to see his favourite football team in action.

Make-A-Wish Australia has granted over 10,000 wishes to children living with a critical illness and has been recognised as one of the top-most trusted children's charities on The Australian Charity Reputation Index.

On 29 April, Make-A-Wish affiliates all over the world celebrate World Wish Day in honour of the first wish granted and all children currently on a wish journey.

== Wishes ==
To receive a wish, a child must be between the ages of 3 and 18 years, living in Australia, experiencing a life-threatening disease or medical condition. Make-A-Wish Australia contacts each child's medical specialist to establish eligibility.

Research and impact studies on wishes from around the world show they can have a powerful impact on children living with a life-threatening illness (2019 in the UK, 2018 in United States, 2015 in Israel).

== Activities ==
Make-A-Wish Australia works with several companies across Australia including The Walt Disney Company, Hungary Jacks, Coles, Southern Cross Austero, Blooms The Chemist, The John James Foundation, Hallmark Cards, Hertz, Hyundai Help for Kids, OOh!media, Sass & Bide, Seed Heritage.

Make-A-Wish Australia's Chief Executive is Sally Bateman, who was appointed in 2018. The charity's Chair is John Armstrong.
