= Robyn Moore (Australian voice actor) =

Australian actress and voice-over artist

- Born: 1950 (age 75–76); Hobart, Tasmania, Australia
- Occupation: Voice actress
- Years active: 1970s–present
- Spouse: Hal Moore
- Children: 2

Robyn Moore AM (born 1950) is an Australian voice-over artist and actress who runs a motivational speaking business.

Originally a primary school teacher, Moore began creating educational recordings for the Australian Broadcasting Corporation in the early 1970s, and in 1976 transitioned to voice-over work full time.

== Voice-over work ==
Moore has voiced many advertisements, animated movies and television shows well known to Australians, including the "iconic" Spray'n'Wipe commercials. Moore voiced many animated Yoram Gross productions, often with frequent collaborator Keith Scott, including as the voice of Blinky Bill in the television series The Adventures of Blinky Bill and as Dot in several of the later Dot movies.

She stepped into the popular 1980s radio comedy The Samuel Pepys Show with The Naked Vicar Show actors Ross Higgins and Kevin Golsby after Vicar partner Noeline Brown declined the role.

Since 1986, Moore voiced all of the female characters in 7500 episodes of the award-winning satire How Green was my Cactus, Australia's longest-running radio series.

== Public speaking ==
After donating a speech to the staff of her airline carrier as thanks, Moore was encouraged to spend more time delivering motivational speeches. Since the 1990s she has had a career as a public speaker providing motivational monologue grounded in her own experience. Her 2005 Tasmanian Honour Role entry claims that she speaks to about 40,000 people each year about "the power of the word". As of the 2020s she was still an in demand speaker.

== Personal life ==
Moore is a lifetime patron of Make-A-Wish Australia and has been a National Patron since 1992.

She was inducted to the Tasmanian Honour Role for Women in 2005 for "service to the Arts".

In 2021 Moore was recognised on the Queen's Birthday Honours List with the Order of Australia (AM) "For significant service to charitable organisations and to the performing arts".

She lives in Tasmania with her husband, musician Hal Moore. They have two children.
