= John Sangster =

Australian jazz composer, arranger and multi-instrumentalist (1928–1995)

- Also known as: Grant Sangster
- Born: John Grant Sangster; 17 November 1928; Melbourne, Victoria, Australia
- Died: 26 October 1995 (aged 66) Brisbane, Queensland, Australia
- Genre: Jazz
- Occupation: Musician
- Instruments: Trombone; trumpet; drums; percussion; cornet; vibraphone
- Years active: 1948–1980

John Grant Sangster (17 November 1928 – 26 October 1995) was an Australian jazz composer, arranger and multi-instrumentalist. He is best known as a composer although he also worked with Graeme Bell, Humphrey Lyttelton and Don Burrows. His solo albums include The Lord of the Rings-inspired works starting with The Hobbit Suite in 1973.

== Early years ==
John Grant Sangster was born in 1928 in the Melbourne suburb of Sandringham as the only child of John Sangster (1896–1975), a clerk and World War II soldier, and Isabella Dunn (née Davidson, later Pringle) Sangster (1890–1946). He attended primary schools in Sandringham and Vermont, and then Box Hill High School. While at high school he taught himself to play trombone and, with a friend, Sid Bridle, formed a band.

In 1946 he started a civil engineering course at Melbourne Technical School. In September of that year Sangster was charged with the murder and manslaughter of his mother, Isabella Sangster. The incident was reported in newspapers, The Sun's correspondent described how police found her, "lying on the floor of a lounge-room. A blood-stained axe was found near the back door – and there were signs of a struggle."

He was tried at the Supreme Court of Victoria in December and was found not guilty of both charges by the jury. A reporter for The Sydney Morning Herald observed, "Accused had told the Court that when his mother locked up his clothes so that he could not go out he broke the door open with an axe. His mother swung a broom at him and he held up his arms to ward off the blow. In doing so, he knocked his mother on the head with the axe."

== Professional career ==
In 1948 Sangster performed at the third annual Australian Jazz Convention, held in Melbourne. By the following year he led his own ensemble, John Sangster's Jazz Six, which included Ken Evans on trombone. Sangster provided trombone for Graeme Bell and his Australian Jazz Band, later taking up the cornet and then the drums. He toured several times with Bell from 1950 to 1955, playing in Australia, the United Kingdom, Germany, Japan and Korea. In the late 1950s he began playing the vibraphone, which he found "combined the percussive qualities of the drums with the melodic capability of the trumpet" (Bisset, 1979). He played with Don Burrows in the early 1960s. Sangster formed his own quartet and experimented with group improvisatory jazz, after he became interested in the music of such musicians as Sun Ra and Archie Shepp. He rejoined the Don Burrows Group briefly in 1967 when they represented Australia at Expo 1967 in Montreal, Quebec, Canada.

In 1969 Sangster began to work with rock musicians and he joined the expanded lineup of the Australian progressive rock group Tully, who provided the musical backing for the original Australian production of the rock musical Hair. He performed and recorded with Tully and their successors, Luke's Walnut, throughout the two years he played in Hair. In 1970 he re-joined the Burrows group, this time for Expo 1970 in Osaka, Japan.

In the 1970s Sangster released a series of popular The Lord of the Rings inspired albums that started with The Hobbit Suite in 1973. He was also the composer of a large number of scores for television shows, documentaries, films, and radio slots (including Hanna-Barbera's The Funky Phantom). In 1988, Sangster published his autobiography, Seeing the Rafters.

He died in Brisbane, Queensland on 26 October 1995 at age 66.

== Discography ==
=== Albums ===
- The Trip (1967)
- The Joker is Wild (1968, Festival Records)
- Ahead of Hair (1969, Festival Records)
- Marinetti (Original Soundtrack, 1969) reissued 2009 Roundtable Records
- Once Around the Sun (Original Soundtrack, 1970) reissued 2009 Roundtable Records
- Australia and all that Jazz volume one (1971, Cherry Pie Records)
- The Hobbit Suite (1973, Swaggie Records)
- Paradise volume one (1973, Trinity Records)
- Lord of the Rings volume one (1975) reissued 2002 by Move Records - AUS #93
- Lord of the Rings volume two (1976) reissued 2004 by Move Records
- Australia and all that Jazz volume two (1976, Cherry Pie Records)
- Lord of the Rings volume three (1977) reissued 2005 by Move Records
- For Leon Bismark volume one (1977, Swaggie Records)
- Double Vibes: Hobbit (1977, Swaggie Records)
- Landscapes of Middle Earth (1978) reissued 2006 by Move Records
- Uttered Nonsense - The Owl and the Pussycat (1980, Rain-Forest Records) reissued by Move Records
- Fluteman (1982, Rain-Forest Records) reissued 2013 by Move Records

With others

- Dig Richards, Harlequin (RCA Victor, 1971)
- Neil Sedaka, Workin' on a Groovy Thing (MCA Records, 1969)

== Sources ==
- Bisset, Andrew, "Black Roots, White Flowers" (1979), Golden Press, ISBN 0-85558-680-X
- Carr, Ian; Fairweather, Digby; Priestley, Brian, "Jazz: The Rough Guide" (1995), Penguin, ISBN 1-85828-137-7.
- Sangster, John, "Seeing the rafters: the life and times of an Australian jazz musician" (1988), Penguin, ISBN 0-14-010928-5
- Sharpe, John, "Don't worry baby, they'll swing their arses off" (2001), ScreenSound Australia, ISBN 0-9579390-0-0
