= Ethel Pedley =

Australian writer

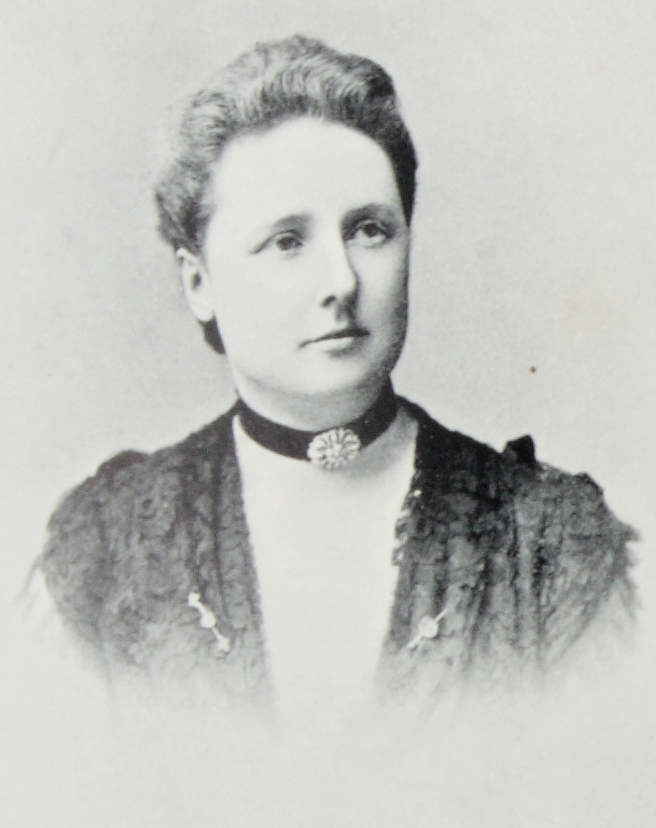
- Ethel Pedley's photograph from the author page of Dot and the Kangaroo.
- Born: Ethel Charlotte Pedley; 19 June 1859; Acton, London, England
- Died: 6 August 1898 (aged 39); Darlinghurst, New South Wales, Australia
- Resting place: Waverley Cemetery, Bronte, Sydney, New South Wales, Australia
- Education: Royal Academy of Music (1882)
- Occupations: Author, musician
- Years active: 1882–1898

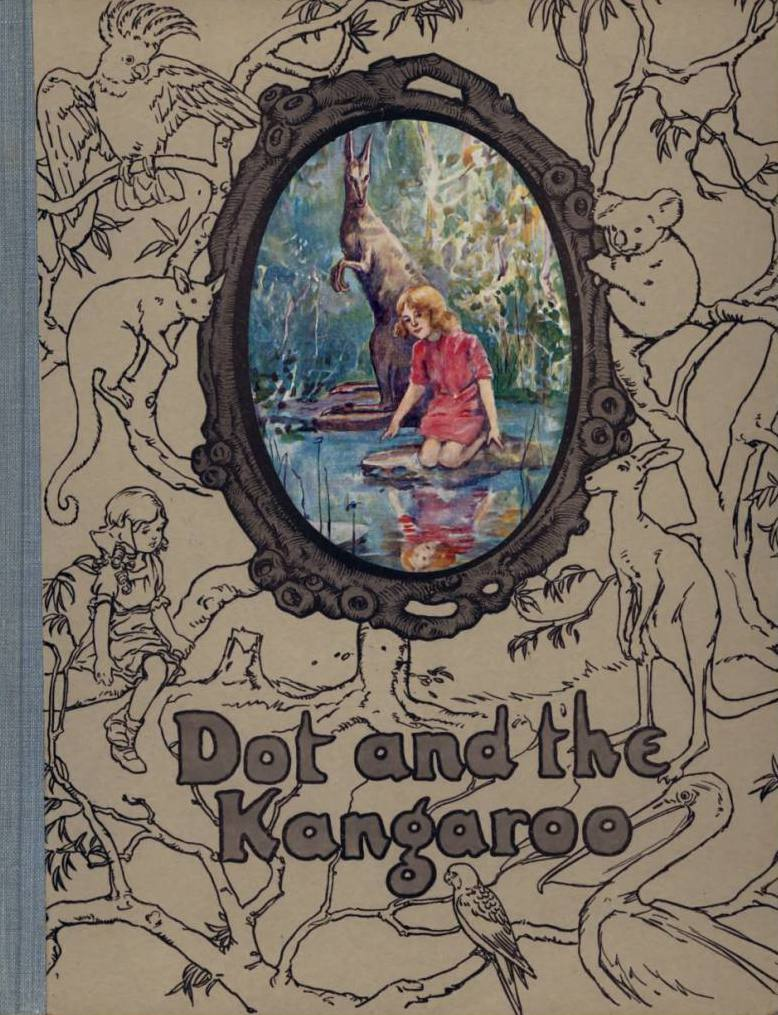
Cover of a 1920 publication of Dot and the Kangaroo

Ethel Charlotte Pedley (19 June 1859 – 6 August 1898) was an English-Australian author and musician.

== Early life ==
Ethel Charlotte Pedley was born on 19 June 1859 at Acton, near London. She was the daughter of Frederick Pedley and his wife Eliza, née Dolby. Pedley began piano lessons aged 5. Pedley migrated to Australia with her family in the 1870s but returned to London to study at the Royal Academy of Music, where she studied with her uncle Prosper Sainton, professor of violin, and won a medal. She was also trained by her aunt, the famous contralto Charlotte Sainton-Dolby, at her Vocal Academy.

== Career ==
=== Musician and music teacher ===
Pedley returned to Sydney in 1882, and began teaching singing and the violin. In 1896 Emmeline Woolley and Pedley visited London and persuaded the Associated Board of the Royal Academy of Music and the Royal College of Music to extend their examinations to the Australian colonies. Pedley was appointed the solo representative of the Royal Academy of Music for New South Wales. The first examiner visited in 1897.

=== Author ===
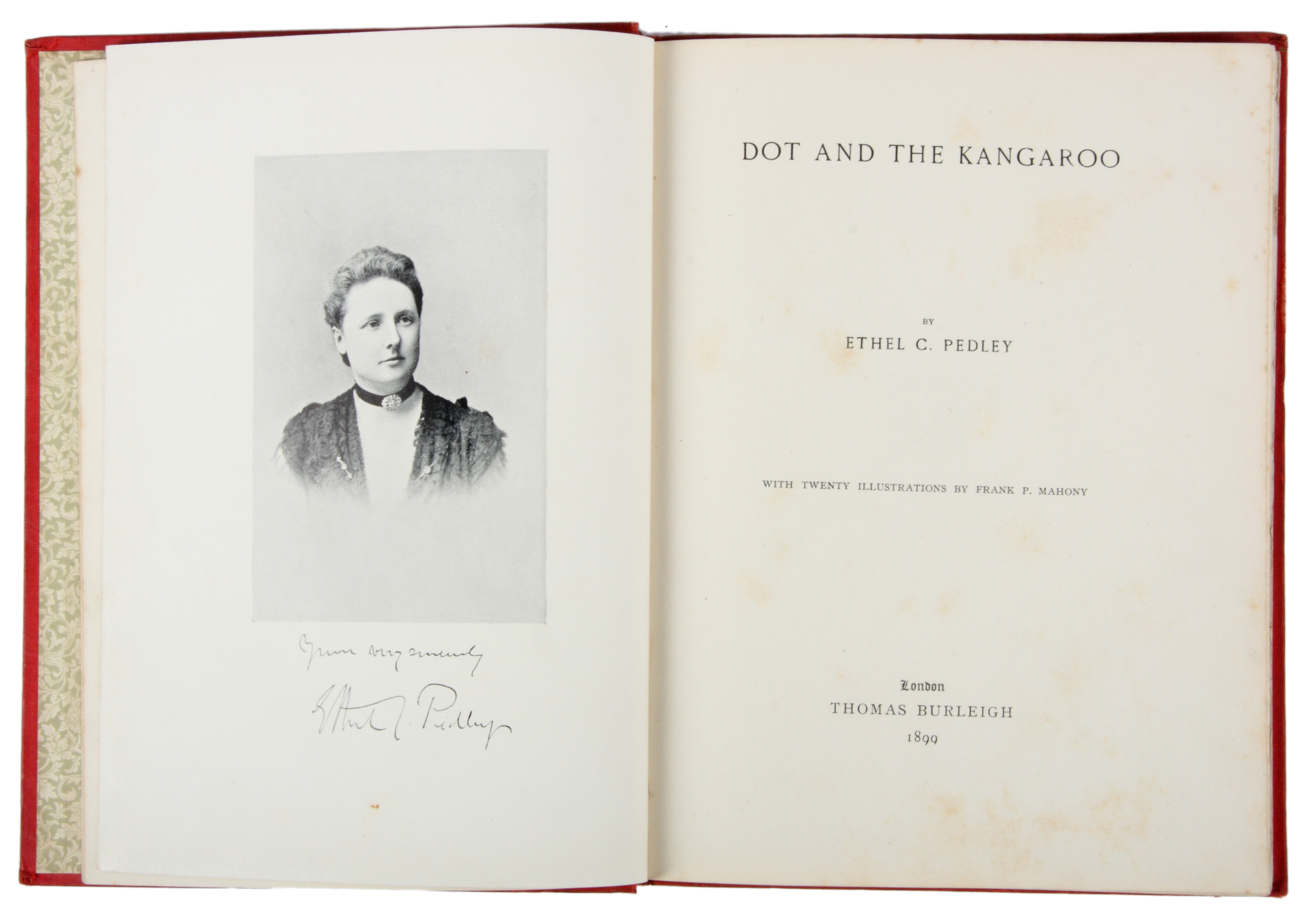
A scan of a first edition copy of Dot and the Kangaroo, which included a photograph of Pedley and a copy of her signature.

Pedley's only published book is Dot and the Kangaroo, which featured a little girl named Dot who becomes lost in the Australian outback, and is helped to find her way back home by a friendly kangaroo. The illustrations were drawn by Frank P. Mahony.

Pedley was a believer in the conservation of the Australian flora and fauna, and usually wrote from this perspective, singling out 'man' as disconnected from nature and the rest of the animals. It is thought her writing was inspired by her visits to the property owned by her brother Arthur, near Walgett.

Ethel's preface to Dot and the Kangaroo is as follows:

To the children of Australia
in the hope of enlisting their sympathies
for the many beautiful, amiable, and frolicsome creatures
of their fair land,
whose extinction, through ruthless destruction,
is being surely accomplished

== Illness and death ==
Stricken with cancer, Pedley died on 6 August 1898 at the Darlinghurst home of her companion Emmeline Woolley at the age of 39. Her only novel, Dot and the Kangaroo would be published posthumously the following year. Pedley was buried in the Anglican section of Waverley Cemetery. Following her death, her brother established the Ethel Pedley memorial travelling scholarship for music students.

== Works ==
- Woolley, Emmeline M. D.; Pedley, Ethel C (1895), The captive soul, s.n.]
- Pedley, Ethel; Mahony, Frank P. (1899), Dot and the kangaroo, Tomas Burleigh
