= Dot and the Kangaroo =

1899 book by Ethel C. Pedley

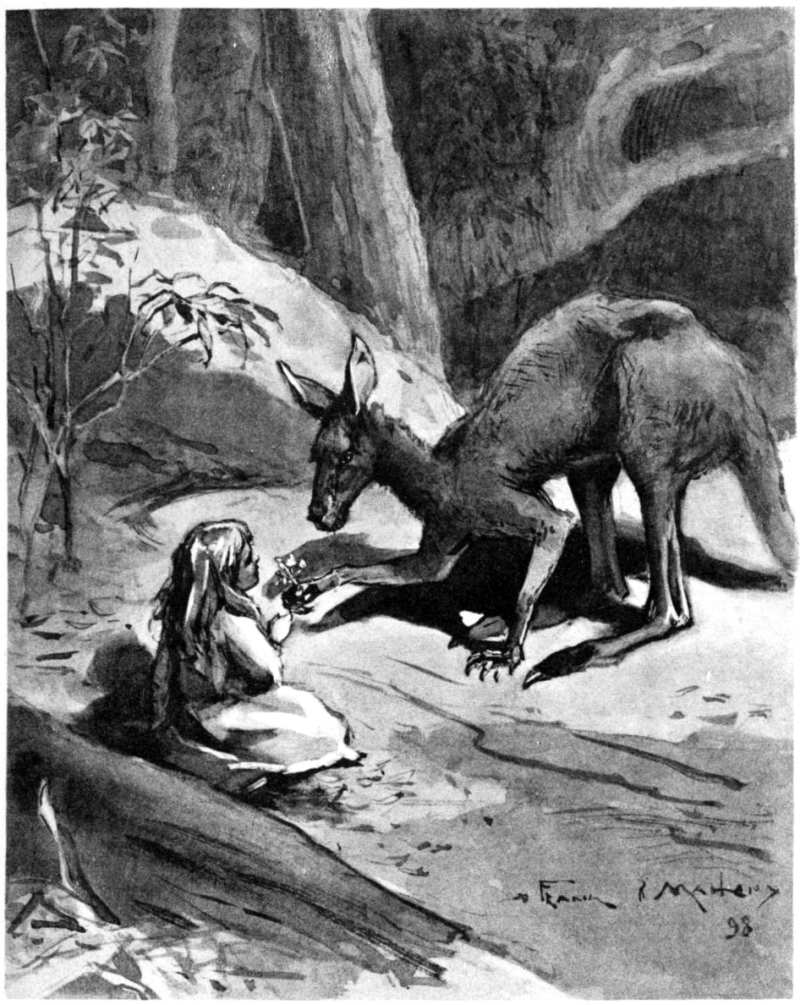
- Dot meets the Kangaroo
- Author: Ethel Pedley
- Illustrator: Frank P. Mahony
- Language: English
- Genre: Children's novel
- Publisher: Angus and Robertson
- Publication date: 1899
- Publication place: Australia
- Media type: Print (hardback and paperback)
- Pages: 81 pp
- ISBN: 1-4191-1659-2
- OCLC: 224601955

Dot and the Kangaroo is an 1899 Australian children's book written by Ethel C. Pedley about a young girl named Dot who gets lost in the Australian bush and is eventually befriended by a kangaroo and several other marsupials. The book was adapted into a stage production in 1924, and a film in 1977.

== Plot summary ==
A 5-year-old girl named Dot is lost in the bush after chasing a hare into the wood and losing sight of her home. She is approached by a grey kangaroo who gives her some berries to eat. Upon eating the berries, Dot is able to understand the language of all animals, and she tells the kangaroo her plight. The kangaroo, who has lost her own joey, decides to help little Dot despite her own fear of humans. They consult the platypus (who insists on being called Ornithorhynchus Paradoxus) and he tells them that Willy Wagtail will be able to help her. After much adventure, including being hunted by Aborigines and Dot being on trial in an animal court, Dot and her kangaroo finally find her home, and the kangaroo finds her joey there.

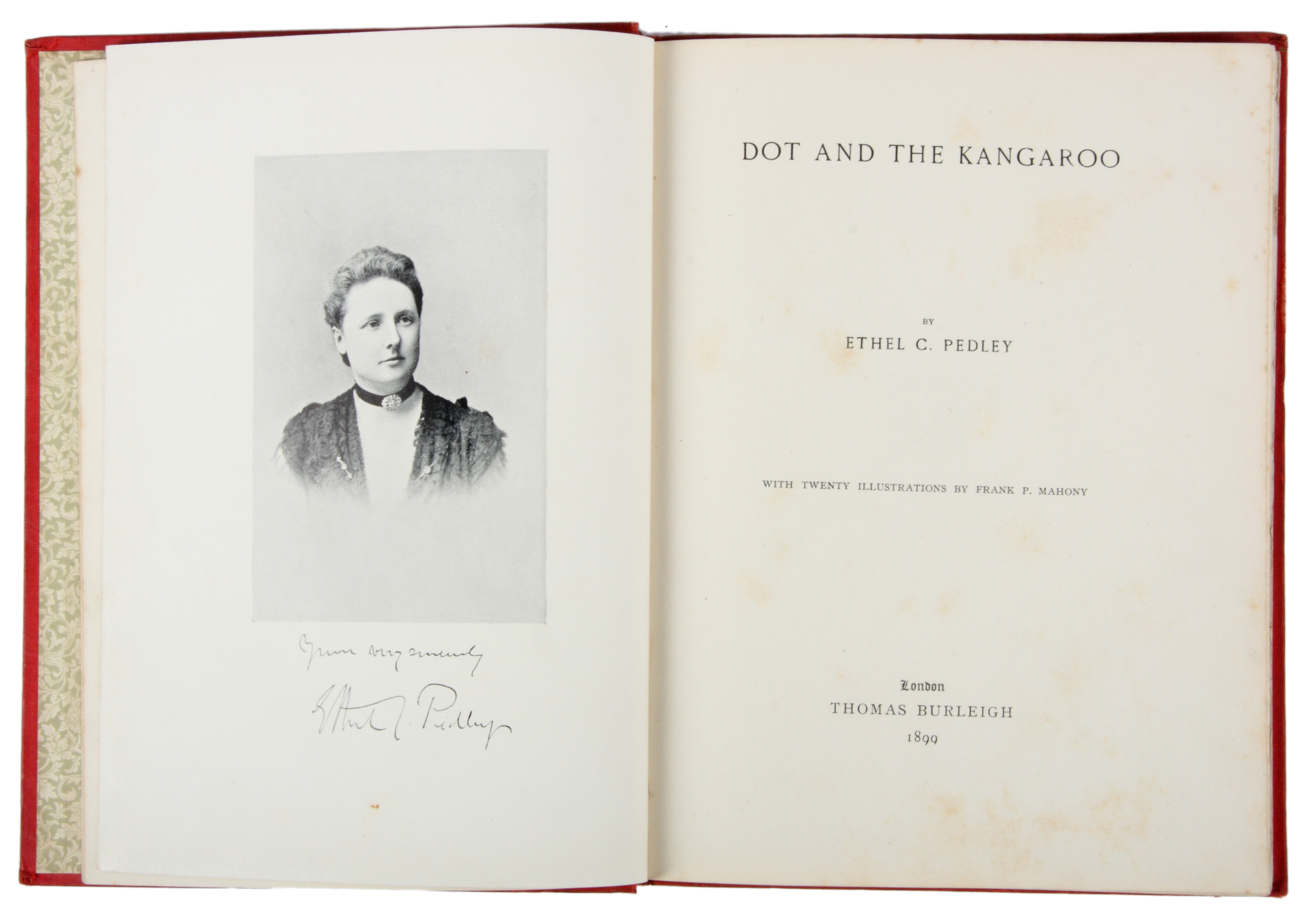
A scan of a first edition copy of Dot and the Kangaroo, which included a photograph of Pedley and a copy of her signature.

== Film adaptations ==
A film adaptation was released in 1977 directed by Yoram Gross. It combines animation with live action.
