= List of Blinky Bill episodes =

This is a list of episodes of the Australian children's television series The Adventures of Blinky Bill.

== Series overview ==
Series	Episodes	Originally released	
Series	Episodes	First released	Last released
1	26	4 January 1993	8 February 1993
2	26	2 January 1995	6 February 1995
3	26	10 June 2004	5 July 2004
Special		24 December 2005	

== Episodes ==
=== Season 1 (1993) ===
No. overall	No. in season	Title	Written by	Original release date
1	1	"Blinky Bill's Favourite Café"	Sally Farrell Odgers	4 January 1993
Blinky and his friends try to help a depressed Mr. Gloop by getting Mayor Pelican to rebuild his café. But the Dingoes hinder the plan to get a place for "dingoes" instead. With Mr. Wombat's help, Bunyip Day provides a perfect opportunity for Blinky to get the café opened for this occasion.
2	2	"Blinky Bill's Fire Brigade"	Susan Beak and Geoff Beak; John Palmer (story)	5 January 1993
After the new school is constructed a storm comes and starts fires around the ground. Realizing the danger, Blinky and his friends form a fire brigade. When mishaps occur the fire brigade seems like trouble, but they come to Blinky and Myrtle's rescue when a bush fire starts.
3	3	"Blinky Rescues the Budgie"	Susan Beak and Geoff Beak	6 January 1993
At Ms. Pym's general store, Blinky and his friends take her pet budgie Cedric thinking he's in need of freedom. Cedric tries to enjoy his new yet inadequate experience, which causes inconvenience for Greenpatch. Eventually Cedric decides to rejoin Ms. Pym.
4	4	"Blinky Bill's Fund Run"	John Palmer	7 January 1993
On Blinky's suggestion, Mayor Pelican starts up a Fund Run marathon to raise money for rebuilding a hospital. The Dingoes seize that event for the money. Blinky and his friends train hard for the race and avoid the Dingoes' cheating, resulting in Marcia as the winner.
5	5	"Blinky Bill the Teacher"	Sally Farrell Odgers	8 January 1993
Tired of school, Blinky humiliates Miss Magpie in front of school Inspector Fox. With Miss Magpie out, the Inspector gives the teaching position to Blinky. Blinky proves to be a tiresome teacher and the job is harder than he thought. With that, Blinky persuades Miss Magpie to come back.
6	6	"Blinky and the Red Car"	Susan Beak and Geoff Beak; Yoram Gross (story)	11 January 1993
Blinky and his friends see Mr. Possum's red car and compete against the Dingoes in a job hunting scheme to earn the money to buy it.
7	7	"Blinky Breaks the Drought"	Sally Farrell Odgers	12 January 1993
Blinky helps Mrs. Rabbit grow carrots to cut down her expenses. The Dingoes swipe some carrots from the garden for personal profit, but having failed to get away with it, they dam off Greenpatch's water supply. Blinky and his friends get Flap to dig up the dam.
8	8	"Blinky Saves Granny's Glasses"	John Palmer	13 January 1993
The Dingoes, while cycling smash Granny Grunty's glasses. To replace them, Blinky and his friends start a stage performance to raise the money they need. The Dingoes try to steal the show, giving the play a new twist and Blinky successfully gets the necessary money for new glasses.
9	9	"Blinky Bill's Ghost Cave"	Sally Farrell Odgers	14 January 1993
The Rabbit family is homeless and losing their things. Blinky finds a cave, ideal for the rabbits to move into, except something creepy is inside. Blinky and Nutsy find out the Dingoes have been taking the rabbits' things and scaring them, so Blinky makes his own spook to drive them out.
10	10	"Blinky Bill's Zoo"	Sally Farrell Odgers	15 January 1993
After Miss Magpie teaches her class about humans and species, a lost little girl becomes Blinky and the others' interest to house her in a zoo of their own. In trying to teach her tricks, Jacko, Splodge, Flap, and even Blinky get injuries. Soon the girl leaves the bush by a passing helicopter.
11	11	"Blinky and the Magician"	Carol Witt and David Witt	16 January 1993
Blinky and his friends meet the magician El Diablo and become his assistants after letting the animals out. El Diablo is actually Danny Dingo keeping Greenpatch out of the way whilst Meatball steals the town's food. As Blinky and the others disrupt the show, they blow the Dingoes' scheme.
12	12	"Detective Blinky"	Carol Witt and David Witt	19 January 1993
Blinky and Splodge turn detective when all the Mulgar Berries in Greenpatch mysteriously disappear.
13	13	"Blinky and the Heart of the Tree"	Carol Witt and David Witt; Yoram Gross (story)	20 January 1993
Mr. Wombat tells Blinky the story of an old tree and a young Koala with a flute against an evil Dingo Queen.
14	14	"Blinky and the Strange Koala"	Sally Farrell Odgers; Yoram Gross (story)	21 January 1993
A black and white Koala is being held at a local zoo and Blinky and his friends sneak in to release it. It is actually a Panda from China and is due to be shipped back there. Blinky manages to prevent a serious mix up from happening.
15	15	"Blinky Bill's Gold Mine"	Sally Farrell Odgers	22 January 1993
Blinky makes a claim to mine for gold. Blinky then tricks Danny into buying his faulty mining spot, with Marcia's mother's precious necklace.
16	16	"Blinky and the Film Star"	John Palmer	23 January 1993
The Dingoes shoot a bank robbing film. The leading star Daisy attracts a lot of attention and makes Blinky, Flap and Splodge lovestruck. Marcia and Nutsy discover the acting is just a cover for an actual robbery. Blinky disguises himself as a girl and thwarts the robbery during the filming.
17	17	"Blinky Bill's Treasure Hunt"	Susan Beak and Geoff Beak	24 January 1993
Mr. Wombat tells Blinky about the legend of Captain Moonbeam's treasure and the gang decide to look for it underground. The Dingoes steal the treasure chest but are less than pleased when the actual treasure is revealed to be old bean cans.
18	18	"Blinky Bill and "Club Pet""	Carol Witt and David Witt	29 January 1993
A new tourist resort is built in town before the hospital could be built, but is attracting Feral Cats who are eating the local wildlife.
19	19	"Blinky Leads the Gang"	Carol Witt and David Witt	30 January 1993
An election takes place for gang leader between Blinky and Danny. Danny uses underhanded methods to win and Blinky and his friends are forced to come up with a plan to outwit him.
20	20	"Blinky Bill Finds Marcia Mouse"	Sally Farrell Odgers	31 January 1993
Feeling left out, Marcia tries a 'rebel' image and ends up in trouble at school for biting and rudeness. When she is grounded, she runs away from home. Blinky and Nutsy formulate a plan to get her to come back.
21	21	"Blinky and the Monster"	Sally Farrell Odgers	1 February 1993
Danny Dingo claims to Blinky and his friends that a monster dwells in a lake. Danny gets Meatball to be the monster in a film to deliver evidence to Blinky, but Flap fools the Dingoes with his own monster.
22	22	"Blinky Saves Twiggy"	Hugh Stucky	2 February 1993
Blinky and his friends find a lost baby echidna named Twiggy who is trying to find her mother. Blinky and his friends take good care of her while the search for her mother is on.
23	23	"Mayor Blinky Bill"	Carol Witt and David Witt	5 February 1993
With many complaints against Mayor Pelican, he decides to lend the job to Blinky. While trying to build a river road, Blinky tries to keep everyone satisfied. The peak of a successful plan to build the road fails altogether and Blinky gives back position of mayor back to Pelican.
24	24	"Who is Blinky Bill?"	John Palmer	6 February 1993
A family of koalas come to Greenpatch for two days. Their son Algenon is a lookalike to Blinky but has a different personality. Blinky and Algenon swap their identities for a new experience, causing confusion for their parents and Miss Magpie.
25	25	"Blinky Bill's Mothers Day"	Sally Farrell Odgers	7 February 1993
Mothers Day arrives in Greenpatch and Nutsy is upset because she remembers her mother being killed when the town was destroyed. Shifty finds Nutsy's long-lost father who is suffering from memory loss.
26	26	"Blinky Bill's Wedding Picnic"	Sally Farrell Odgers	8 February 1993
Blinky's mother and Nutsy's father decide to get married and invite the whole town. Shifty broke his leg while practicing dance steps, Blinky builds a wheelchair to help get Shifty to the wedding.

=== Season 2 (1995) ===
No. overall	No. in season	Title	Written by	Original release date
27	1	"Blinky the Hypnotist"	Ray Nowland and Sally Farrell Odgers	2 January 1995
Many adults in Greenpatch have colds. Blinky amuses himself with some hypnotism, causing confusion and chaos among the townspeople. Some troublesome Goannas pass Greenpatch, but Blinky tricks them with his hypnotism before he undoes the hypnotism he did to the town.
28	2	"Blinky Bill and the Old Wombat's Home"	Susan Beak and Geoff Beak	3 January 1995
Recently Mr. Wombat has been suffering backaches and moves to an elderly people's home. However the matron has very strict rules. Blinky and his gang prompt the old folks how to enjoy themselves and Mr. Wombat decides to go back home.
29	3	"Blinky Bill and the Baby Show"	Susan Beak and Geoff Beak	4 January 1995
Greenpatch is running a baby show. Blinky and his friends volunteer to babysit Mrs. Spotty's six babies and take them to baby show. When the biggest baby Rudolf goes missing, Flap unwillingly takes his place. Mrs. Spotty finds Rudolf and as she goes to find Blinky, Blinky and his friends escape with the first prize.
30	4	"Blinky Bill Meets Mr. Echidna"	Ray Nowland and Sally Farrell Odgers	5 January 1995
Mrs. Echidna has finally had enough of Blinky's mischief and leaves to join her sister. Mrs. Echidna's absence allows termites to freely feed on Greenpatch's trees causing the birds to emigrate. Mrs. Echidna is too busy to return to Greenpatch, so Blinky persuades Mr. Echidna to come. Once the termite problem is taken care of, Mr. Koala arranges Mr. Echidna's wife to come.
31	5	"Blinky Bill and the House Guest"	Susan Beak and Geoff Beak	6 January 1995
A strong gale destroys Mayor Pelican's house. For the next two days Blinky has to put up with the mayor's stay at his place, which gets him in trouble plenty. When Mrs. Koala finds out he's been pooling her resources, she formulates a plan to teach him a lesson.
32	6	"Blinky Bill and the Mystery Pollution"	Sally Farrell Odgers, Susan Beak, and Geoff Beak	9 January 1995
As Blinky fails to style Splodge's hair, Daisy opens a Beauty Boutique. Something is making people develop green hair and black spots and Greenpatch suspects Daisy is the cause, but Blinky's investigation reveals that Danny's cosmetics machine has sprung a leak into the river.
33	7	"Blinky Bill's Blue Mystery"	Susan Beak and Geoff Beak	10 January 1995
Some strange disappearances of blue items occur, but everyone thinks Blinky is behind them. Blinky's gang go detective to clear his name, but his attempts get him in even more trouble. Finally they find the shy Mr. Bowerbird took all those items to attract a mate.
34	8	"Blinky Bill Goes Camping"	Susan Beak and Geoff Beak	11 January 1995
Miss Magpie takes her class camping. Meanwhile Danny has his camping plans with Meatball. Blinky's gang do their dull camping work with some rewarding results. Danny and Meatball get washed away by a storm, but Blinky's gang saves them.
35	9	"Blinky Bill and the Earthquake"	Sally Farrell Odgers and Ray Nowland	12 January 1995
Continuing their camping trip, Blinky's gang slip away to explore a mountain mine. They get trapped after a collapse. As they try to find a way out, a creepy Goanna frightens and chases them through tunnels and down a mine shaft in carts. Once outside the mine and down a river, Blinky's gang are very far and lost from Greenpatch.
36	10	"Blinky Bill Down on the Farm"	Susan Beak and Geoff Beak	13 January 1995
Blinky's gang, stumble across a farm which is guarded by robotic dogs and run by computers. The farm animals shun the outside world. Blinky's gang are soon on the run from Dr. Beamstock and Mrs. Universe and evade the robotic dogs and finally shut down the farm and release the animals into the outside.
37	11	"Blinky Bill is Kidnapped"	Sally Farrell Odgers	14 January 1995
As Blinky and Marcia investigate cages, they are accidentally taken by a forest ranger. Along the way they are met by a possum named Slick. They soon unite with Nutsy, Splodge, Flap and Shifty. They finally hand themselves to the ranger, who was just taking them back to the bush.
38	12	"Blinky Bill and the Lost Puppy"	Sally Farrell Odgers	15 January 1995
Blinky's gang find a lost puppy, who accompanies them in search of his home, Nutsy taking care of him. Blinky's gang trace Puppy's steps back to his house, while avoiding two pursuing dogs, Bruno and Hillda from the 1992 film, who were only sent to find Puppy. Finally Puppy finds his owner Annie.
39	13	"Blinky Bill & the Winter's Tale"	Susan Beak and Geoff Beak	18 January 1995
Blinky's gang find shelter in a mountain cabin with restless owls living in it. Blinky's gang tidy up and look after Mrs. Owl's babies. They are quite a handful at first, but Blinky makes good behaviour fun for them. Blinky does some skiing and brings Mr. Owl back with his family.
40	14	"Blinky Bill and the Polar Bears"	Sally Farrell Odgers, Susan Beak, and Geoff Beak	19 January 1995
Blinky's gang are suddenly met by Boris a polar bear who left his human run homeland to come to Australia. Boris needs to find a good home and get his family out of the circus he travelled with, but then they receive a letter from their grandparents persuading them to return north.
41	15	"Blinky Bill and the Lighthouse"	Sally Farrell Odgers and Ray Nowland	20 January 1995
Blinky's gang approach a lighthouse, which gives the penguins here an advantage over the Skewer family in fishing. Blinky's gang withstands Mrs. Skewer's unpleasantry, but when her son Suki is lost at sea and rescued by Flap, she realizes the importance of the Lighthouse.
42	16	"Blinky Bill and the Apple Thieves"	Sally Farrell Odgers	21 January 1995
Shifty finds some apples in a farming acre and the family of the place believe Shifty to be the one stealing apples every night. Shifty gets caught in one of the traps they set. After Blinky's gang rescue Shifty, they all thwart the thieves' final heist.
43	17	"Blinky and the Egg Rescue"	Sally Farrell Odgers, Susan Beak, and Geoff Beak	22 January 1995
Flap finds a cuckoo egg in a basket in the middle of the grasslands. Blinky's gang try unsuccessfully to plant it into other bird's nest. When a bulldozer, driven by Harry from the 1992 film, approaches, Blinky's gang rescue all the other birds' eggs. All the eggs hatch and the ducks adopt the cuckoo.
44	18	"Blinky Bill's Holiday"	Susan Beak and Geoff Beak	23 January 1995
Blinky's gang follow a bus with Ms. Pym inside in hope of getting to Greenpatch. Instead they end up at a holiday resort, but try to enjoy it. They then meet Cedric and notice Ms. Pym is smitten with a man called Arthur. They then cause a calamity and their chance to stow with Ms. Pym is thwarted.
45	19	"Blinky Bill and the Bird Smugglers"	Susan Beak and Geoff Beak	26 January 1995
Blinky's gang plunge down a delta and meet a lizard named Hank whose parents were taken by poachers, Neil and Christopher. Flap is taken away, but Blinky's gang head to the dinghy and trap the poachers. They sail the dinghy to a sandbank where the poachers are taken away by the coast guard.
46	20	"Blinky Bill and the Crocodiles"	Susan Beak and Geoff Beak	27 January 1995
On the trip back to Greenpatch, Blinky and his friends are met by a crocodile called Sirol who was exiled by his father for being soft. Blinky's gang train and disguise Sirol for the Iron Croc Contest. Sirol gets past every course resulting as the winner and earning good reputation from his family.
47	21	"Blinky and Gretel"	Sally Farrell Odgers, Susan Beak, and Geoff Beak	28 January 1995
During a storm Nutsy tells her friends a fairy tale story about two koalas named Hansel and Gretel who get lost in the woods and meet other fairy tale friends and come across a gingerbread house lived in by a wicked mouse witch, who later sends them down a well to dig for water, but they manage to get her wand and broomstick.
48	22	"Blinky Remembers Nutsy's Birthday"	Sally Farrell Odgers, Susan Beak, and Geoff Beak	29 January 1995
Nutsy thinks no-one remembers her birthday. Flap stumbles across a circus, but the overworked performers are under sickness pretense, so Blinky's Gang decide to do their own performance specially for Nutsy. Out of envy, the other performers get in the show but after the show, they come to a new agreement from Captain Possum.
49	23	"Blinky Bill and the Real Estate Swindle"	Susan Beak and Geoff Beak	3 February 1995
Blinky's Gang meet a couple of Feral Pigs called Wallace and George, who intend to own the Numbat house by trying to scare them away with a monster costume. After venturing out at night, Blinky manages to expose the two swindlers.
50	24	"Blinky Bill and the Feud"	Sally Farrell Odgers and Ray Nowland	4 February 1995
After a long hot walk Blinky and his friends find a river, but the inhabitants of the place are very mean and fight all the time. The cause of this is the animals' differences in sleeping patterns. After much fighting even amongst themselves, Blinky's gang trick the animals into working together.
51	25	"Blinky Bill and the Possum's Cinema"	Susan Beak and Geoff Beak	5 February 1995
Blinky's gang end up in a deserted town after fleeing a dust storm. They find Blinky's old possum friend Slick in a movie theatre. Blinky's gang manage to invite a fair number of animals to see the show. The movies don't go as Slick planned but the audience enjoy it all the same.
52	26	"Blinky Bill and the Balloon"	Sally Farrell Odgers	6 February 1995
Blinky's gang find a hot-air balloon lodged in a tree. Once they get it free, they drift on it. They finally make it to Greenpatch, but can't land. Mr. Wombat receives Blinky's note and a rescue party starts after them with Miss Magpie scouting for them and getting them out of the balloon. Then Greenpatch celebrates with a welcome back party.

=== Season 3 (2004) ===
No. overall	No. in season	Title	Written by	Original release date
53	1	"The Great Escape"	Phil Sanders	10 June 2004
The Circus has come to the Bush run by the Circus Bros. Basil and Cyril. Blinky, Nutsy, and Flap sneak into the Circus and find that the circus animals are mistreated and need freedom. Blinky accidentally does a trapeze stunt which intrigues Basil. Blinky, Nutsy, Flap, and the animals seize their chance to escape in a makeshift hot-air balloon.
54	2	"Bushwhacked"	Rhett Walton	11 June 2004
Blinky, Nutsy, Flap, and the circus animals land in another part of the bush where Blinky teaches them survival skills. Meanwhile, the Circus Bros. go to Greenpatch and trap the residents to lure Blinky in. Blinky and Nutsy come to the rescue and drive off the Circus Bros. and so Blinky and his friends start their trip around the world.
55	3	"Antarctic Adventure"	David Witt	12 June 2004
Blinky heads for Antarctica to take Slippery home. The Circus Bros. pursue them on a trawler with a man named Skipper the Scurvy who had previously caught Slippery. Slippery falls out of the caravan into the boat. Blinky makes a daring rescue and Slippery returns the favor and they stop an attempted seal trapping, allowing Slippery to rejoin his family.
56	4	"Polar Peril"	Gina Roncoli	13 June 2004
After a rough landing on the ice, Blinky and Nutsy go their separate ways to a human village to get some gas for the balloon, while the others form a search party to rescue Ling-Ling from an ice abyss. Blinky and Nutsy work together to outrun the Circus Bros. and procure the gas tank. Blinky manages to inflate the Balloon and depart from Antarctica.
57	5	"Flap's New Family"	Maryam Master	14 June 2004
A baby penguin who boarded the caravan thinks Flap is his mother. Blinky turns back to Antarctica to take him home. Blinky and Flap rescue the penguin colony from the Circus Bros. and unite the baby penguin with his mother Norma. Tico takes out the gas tank, but Blinky is able to inflate with a cooking stove and leave Antarctica.
58	6	"A Stitch in Time"	Phil Sanders	15 June 2004
On the way to Africa, Blinky becomes impatient and tries to get them to Africa faster. Nutsy tells the story of Blinky's recklessness at the mine in Wobbly Creek back in Australia. Meanwhile, the Circus Bros. climb aboard a cruiser then steal the captain's helicopter to chase after the balloon, but they run out of fuel. Soon Blinky and the crew make it to Africa.
59	7	"Leo Leads the Way"	Fiona Kelly	16 June 2004
On the African Plains, Blinky takes Leo home, but Rex, the king of the Mumbada pride and son of Leo does not welcome his father due to his cowardice. The Circus Bros. work alongside two poachers and capture Rex, his son Claude and Blinky. Leo comes to the rescue, earning his son's respect and his place in the pride.
60	8	"Monkey Business"	Stephen Davis	17 June 2004
Blinky comes across a monkey tribe. Yoyo discovers that they are actually chimps. After feeling insulted by Blinky's gang, Yoyo wanders off. Tico sabotages the balloon and sets a trap for Blinky involving Yoyo and the Circus Bros. The Circus Bros. are driven away by the chimp tribe and Flap coaxes Yoyo to rejoin his friends and continue his search for a home.
61	9	"Diamonds Are Forever"	Fiona Bozic	18 June 2004
Blinky tries to copy Ling-Ling's magic disappearing trick on Penelope's diamond necklace and Tico takes it to the Circus Bros. Basil declares he will sell it in the city and stop circuses. Blinky's gang ride ostriches whose feathers were plucked by humans, chasing after the Bros. truck until they are driven into a river. Finally, they get back the necklace.
62	10	"Blinky's Birthday Surprise"	Gina Roncoli	19 June 2004
A birthday party for Blinky in Greenpatch becomes a disaster. In Africa, Blinky is angry that no one knows it is his birthday and is busy preparing to depart. Tico gives Blinky a stolen tracking device as a "birthday present", the Circus Bros. use it to follow him. Blinky rides on a giraffe named Twigger and after finally throwing the Circus Bros. off their trail, finds Twigger's friends, Nene and Dubaku. Blinky returns to the balloon, greeted with a birthday surprise.
63	11	"Baby Elephant Walk"	Chris Phillips	20 June 2004
Blinky's gang collects firewood but the caravan is gone. They then see an elephant named Mrs. Elephant pulling it to transport her sick calf Kiku to find some grass. They escort Mrs. Elephant, with the Circus Bros. in pursuit. After a risky bridge crossing, Mrs. Elephant makes it to the grass field, Kiku recovers and Blinky's gang escapes the Circus Bros. and leaves Africa.
64	12	"Operation Free Flap"	Fiona Kelly	21 June 2004
Over China, Flap falls out of the balloon and Blinky has to make an emergency landing. A boy named Hugh takes Flap and cares for him at home. The Circus Bros. arrive in China and see Flap on the local news. Blinky starts a getaway plan in time to stop the Circus Bros. from taking Flap. After a tearful goodbye to Hugh, Flap rejoins the others to continue their journey.
65	13	"Crouching Dragon, Hidden Koala"	Lisa Hoppe	22 June 2004
Blinky's gang go to Hawks Peak but find only a village. As Blinky's gang search the village for Ling-Ling's Master, most of them get caught by the Circus Bros. disguised as a dragon. Blinky and Ling-Ling find and release the Master Panda. Ling-Ling to is captured. Blinky blows up the door of their prison with firecrackers and Ling-Ling aids in her friends' escape.
66	14	"Panda Pandemonium"	Chris Phillips	23 June 2004
Blinky's gang finds the panda villagers and Ling-Ling is reunited with her parents, but the pandas are short of bamboo. A weasel named Ah-Phat replaces Tico to catch the pandas for Basil. Ling-Ling and Blinky journey to seek plentiful bamboo which turns out to be very promising, then they go with Tico to rescue the pandas and their friends, thus allowing the pandas to go to their new home and Blinky's gang depart from China with the Circus Bros. in tow.
67	15	"Jungle Bungles"	Fiona Kelly	24 June 2004
Blinky and friends reach the Amazon Jungle. Tico tricks Yoyo where he can find his family in the Amazon and spreads scary tales of the Amazon to Blinky's gang. However, they are met by a friendly anaconda named Anna who has aquaphobia. The balloon is carried off by floodwaters and after a tangle with the Circus Bros., Blinky falls into the floodwaters, but Anna saves Blinky and the caravan.
68	16	"Double Trouble"	Rhett Walton	25 June 2004
Blinky and his friends meet a Howler Monkey named Coco Phil and his sister Sophia who live in the town Leafpatch which has many similarities to Greenpatch. The monkeys are not like Yoyo. Blinky and Coco are to compete in trap building until the Circus Bros. catch Nutsy and Sophia. Blinky and Coco rescue and catapult the Circus Bros. into the Amazon River.
69	17	"Tico's Choice"	Lisa Hoppe	26 June 2004
Deeper in the Amazon jungle, Blinky meets a colony of toucans, who find Tico familiar. Tico directs Blinky's gang to the river and Blinky finally realizes Tico's loyalty lies with Basil. Tico helps the Circus Bros. trap the toucans as well as Blinky's gang. But after feeling betrayed, Tico rescues everyone and send the Circus Bros. in the river. Tico decides to stick with Blinky's Gang.
70	18	"Poisoned Penelope"	Fiona Bozic	27 June 2004
Penelope is picking purple flowers but gets pricked by thorns. In Leafpatch, Armo reveals it was a Purple Devil that has poisoned her and that the humans have the cure. Blinky takes Penelope to a camp of Botanists, who give Penelope the medicine and identify Yoyo as a South Indian Monkey. After many mishaps, the Circus Bros. capture Penelope. Blinky's gang come to the rescue then depart for India.
71	19	"All at Sea"	Phil Sanders	28 June 2004
Blinky's gang are drifting south and into a storm. Above them, Cyril abseils from a helicopter, but then falls into the stormy sea. Blinky's gang and Cyril help each other and land on a small Island, where a ship Captain has a debt to collect from Basil. However, Cyril thwarts Basil's capture attempt and left with Basil to face the Captain's wrath.
72	20	"Tico Takes Charge"	Lisa Hoppe	29 June 2004
In India, Blinky's gang meets a trio of performers who are Majid the Bear, Alsana the Mongoose, and Sanjay the Rat. Then a man named Mr. Rashid takes Yoyo with the trio. As the trio performs, Blinky exposes Mr. Rashid's wallet thefts and Flap frees Yoyo. After helping the trio to form their own circus, Blinky's gang continue their journey, while Tico stays behind to direct the trio.
73	21	"Tiger Taming"	Melanie Alexander	30 June 2004
The Circus Bros. tries to ambush Blinky in the balloon (Cyril finding his teddy bear) but accidentally sends it into the air. As Blinky's gang tries to follow, they stumble across a Bengal tiger who is trying to free her trapped daughter Sondeya. Flap frees Sondeya and Penelope drives the Circus Bros. away.
74	22	"Monkey See, Monkey Do"	Stephen Davis	1 July 2004
Blinky's gang reaches Chandipur, the Circus Bros. in pursuit of an elephant. While searching for Yoyo's family, Penelope and then Yoyo are caught by the Circus Bros., but the rest of the Gang rescue them. They enter the Forbidden Temple, aided by inhabiting monkeys against the Circus Bros. and Yoyo finds those monkeys are his kin. With that Blinky's gang depart for Paris.
75	23	"A Dog's Best Friend"	Rhett Walton	2 July 2004
Blinky's gang arrive in Paris in search of Penelope's mistress. Her mistress has moved to a new house and owns a cat named Fifi. The Circus Bros. come and try to catnap Fifi, but Penelope unites with her mistress and hands them the diamond bracelet. Blinky gets it back by trading Cyril his teddy bear, Teddy Pumpkin.
76	24	"Blinky Bill Superstar"	Gina Roncoli	3 July 2004
In a studio Blinky is made a superstar by the fashion designer Phoebe. As days pass, Blinky is so acquainted with his new lifestyle, Nutsy and Flap decide to go home without him. The Circus Bros. abducts Nutsy and Flap and Blinky, realizing how selfish Phoebe is, leaves her and rescues his friends.
77	25	"Paris Au-Go-Go"	David Witt	4 July 2004
With their balloon destroyed, Blinky's gang make their way to the airport. Blinky's gang give themselves up to the Circus Bros. to get a ride to Australia but Basil intends to take them to New York. Blinky's gang sneak on the Koala Airlines plane where a kind stewardess provides their needs.
78	26	"How Green is My Greenpatch"	Andy Ryan	5 July 2004
Blinky's gang make it back to Greenpatch. The Circus Bros. have followed them and Basil starts a bushfire. Cyril leaves Basil's side and summons the fire brigade to extinguish the fire and he takes Basil for retirement.

== TV movie ==
Title	Directed by	Written by	Original release date
"Blinky Bill’s White Christmas"	Guy Gross	John Palmer and Guy Gross	24 December 2005
Greenpatch gets everything ready for Christmas Eve while Blinky does his usual mischievous activity until he goes a bit far and clumsily breaks Walter's precious snow dome. Blinky and Flap make a journey to the Wollemi Valley to get pine to recreate the snow dome, whilst evading a couple of forest poachers and eventually meeting the giant wallaby creatures. Meanwhile, Nutsy and Splodge try to make snow to complete the Christmas celebration.
