= One Pound Only =

- Theatrical release poster
- Directed by: Yoram Gross
- Written by: Yoram Gross; Moshe Hadar
- Produced by: Yoram Gross
- Starring: Yankel Ben Sira; Gideon Singer
- Music by: Eddie Halperin
- Production company: Yoram Gross Films
- Release date: 1964
- Running time: 90 minutes
- Country: Israel
- Language: Hebrew

One Pound Only (also known as A Pound A Piece) is a 1964 Israeli black and white slapstick comedy directed by Yoram Gross.

Yoram Gross' success at the Israeli box office with this came after his first movie, Joseph the Dreamer.

== Plot ==
Gidi "the tall" and Jako "the short", are two bums who colourfully paint the gray streets of Tel Aviv, trying to make some money and find a shelter.

== Cast ==
- Rachel Attas
- Ya'ackov Ben-Sira
- Shraga Friedman
- Michael Gur
- Gita Luka
- Bracha Ne'eman
- Shoshana Ravid
- Shmuel Rodensky
- Shmuel Segal
- Gideon Singer
