= Old Tom (TV series) =

Australian children's animated TV series

- Old Tom and his owner Angela
- Genre: Children's; Comedy; Slapstick
- Written by: Brad Hall; Andrew Kelly; Helen Meany; Phil Sanders; Michael John Wagner; Michael Ward; David Witt; Stu Connolly
- Directed by: Guy Gross
- Voices of: Keith Scott; Kim Hillas; Rachel King; Troy Planet; Angela Moore; Alyssa Cooper; Quentin James
- Composer: Guy Gross
- Countries of origin: France; Australia
- Original languages: French; English
- No. of seasons: 2
- No. of episodes: 52

Production
- Executive producers: Tim Brooke-Hunt; Yoram Gross; Sandra Gross; Claire Henderson; Roch Lener; Jonathan Peel; Geoff Watson
- Producers: Emmanuel Frack; Rodney Whitham
- Running time: 11 minutes
- Production companies: Yoram Gross-EM.TV; Millimages; Australian Broadcasting Corporation

Original release
- Network: ABC Television; ABC3
- Release: 6 June – 8 July 2002

Old Tom is a children's animated television series based on a series of books by Leigh Hobbs. The show features the voice of Keith Scott as the titular character.

The animated series follows the adventures of Angela Throgmorton and her mischievous stray cat named Old Tom, who she treats as if he were her son, despite his bad behaviour and his ill-fated antics.

== Premise ==
The story begins with Angela Throgmorton, a respectable matron living solely, before she finds a basket on her doorstep who happens to carry Old Tom, an orange one-eyed tomcat with a bandaged leg and a crossed-patch on his chest, indicating his rebellious and outrageous personality. Nevertheless, Angela is instantly drawn to Old Tom's charm and cheeky nature, before his real character quickly becomes noticeable, whilst retaining his good-natured charm. Both Angela and Old Tom are oddball, eccentric characters who create mischief and trouble in their suburb as they get involved in humorous adventures and chaotic situations, in addition to Old Tom's genuine, yet unlucky, attempts to be good after causing trouble.

Recurring characters include Old Tom's best friend Lucy, Angela's snobby, posh-speaking, rich friend Lavinia Winterberry who has a dog that resembles her, and Billy, a troublesome boy who enjoys bothering Old Tom.

== Music ==
Guy Gross composed a frenzy jazz soundtrack which expresses the lead character's havoc. Gross worked with composer Clive Harrison to supervise the score production with Sydney's jazz session musicians.

== Episodes ==
The series premiered on Wednesday 6 June 2002 on ABC Kids with "Lost & Found" and concluded with "Meteor Madness" on Monday 8 July 2002.

=== Season 1 (2002) ===
1. Lost & Found
2. Shopping Spree
3. Friend and Foe
4. Blast Off!
5. Fiddle-De-Dee!
6. Skin Deep
7. Wheel Nuts
8. Mad About the House
9. Tee for Tom
10. Food Feud
11. Tidy Your Room!
12. Rubble Trouble
13. Up, Up, and Away!
14. Surprise!
15. All at Sea
16. www.Old.Tom
17. Picture Perfect
18. Easy Monet
19. Leonardo Da Tom
20. Picnic Panic
21. Happy Camper
22. Too Many Crooks
23. Big Top Tom
24. Rock'N'Roll Tom
25. Green Thumb Fun
26. Eau De Tom

=== Season 2 (2002) ===
1. Fangs a Lot
2. Sorcerer's Apprentice
3. Ghost Train
4. Plumber's Mate
5. Flower Power
6. Two to Tango
7. Sailing Away
8. Bird in the Hand
9. The Queen and I
10. Faster Pasta
11. Piece of Cake
12. Good Sports
13. Let's Get Quizzical
14. In a Whirl
15. April Fool!
16. Rainy Daze
17. Whale of a Time
18. Switched-On Tom
19. Seeing Spots
20. Zoo-Loose
21. Aieee! Robot
22. Swings and Roundabouts
23. Tree's a Crowd
24. Tutenkhamen Tom
25. Lights! Camera! Old Tom!
26. Meteor Madness

== Production ==
Production on the series was announced in November 1999, when Yoram Gross-EM.TV had collaborated with French animation studio Millimages to adapt Leigh Hobbs' book series Old Tom into an animated television series of the same name with The Australian Broadcasting Corporation and French television network TF1 serving as commissioners with a 2001 delivery date with Yoram Gross-EM.TV and Millimages would produce & handle animation production services while AAC Kids, the kids & family production label of Toronto-based Canadian film & television production/distribution company Alliance Atlantis, had brought worldwide distribution rights to the series except for Asia-Pacific, Eastern Europe, French-speaking territories (including France) and Germany where Yoram Gross-EM.TV and its parent EM.TV & Merchandising would distribute it in those territores,

When the series ended and after Alliance Atlantis had closed its kids & family unit AAC Kids a year later in 2003, Millimages, whom launched its distribution arm in February 2002 and Yoram Gross-EM.TV's parent EM.TV & Merchandising assumed worldwide distribution to the series however, Belgian production group Studio 100 would soon takeover distribution to the series six years later in May 2008 when its German distribution unit Studio 100 International had brought out Australian animation studio Flying Bark Productions and its German kids & family entertainment parent EM.Entertainment from Sport1 Medien.

== See also ==
- The Adventures of Blinky Bill (1993–2004)
- Tabaluga (1997–2004)
- Skippy: Adventures in Bushtown (1998–1999)
- Flipper & Lopaka (1999–2005)
