= Yoram Gross =

Polish-Australian animation producer and director (1926–2015)

Yoram Gross AM
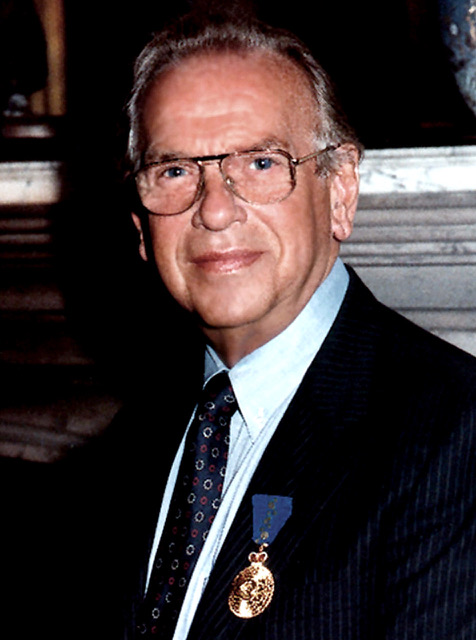
- Yoram Gross in 1995 with his Order of Australia Award
- Born: Yoram Jerzy Gross; 18 October 1926; Kraków, Second Polish Republic
- Died: 21 September 2015 (aged 88); Sydney, Australia
- Occupations: Animation director and founder of Flying Bark Productions
- Years active: 1947–2015
- Spouse: Sandra Gross

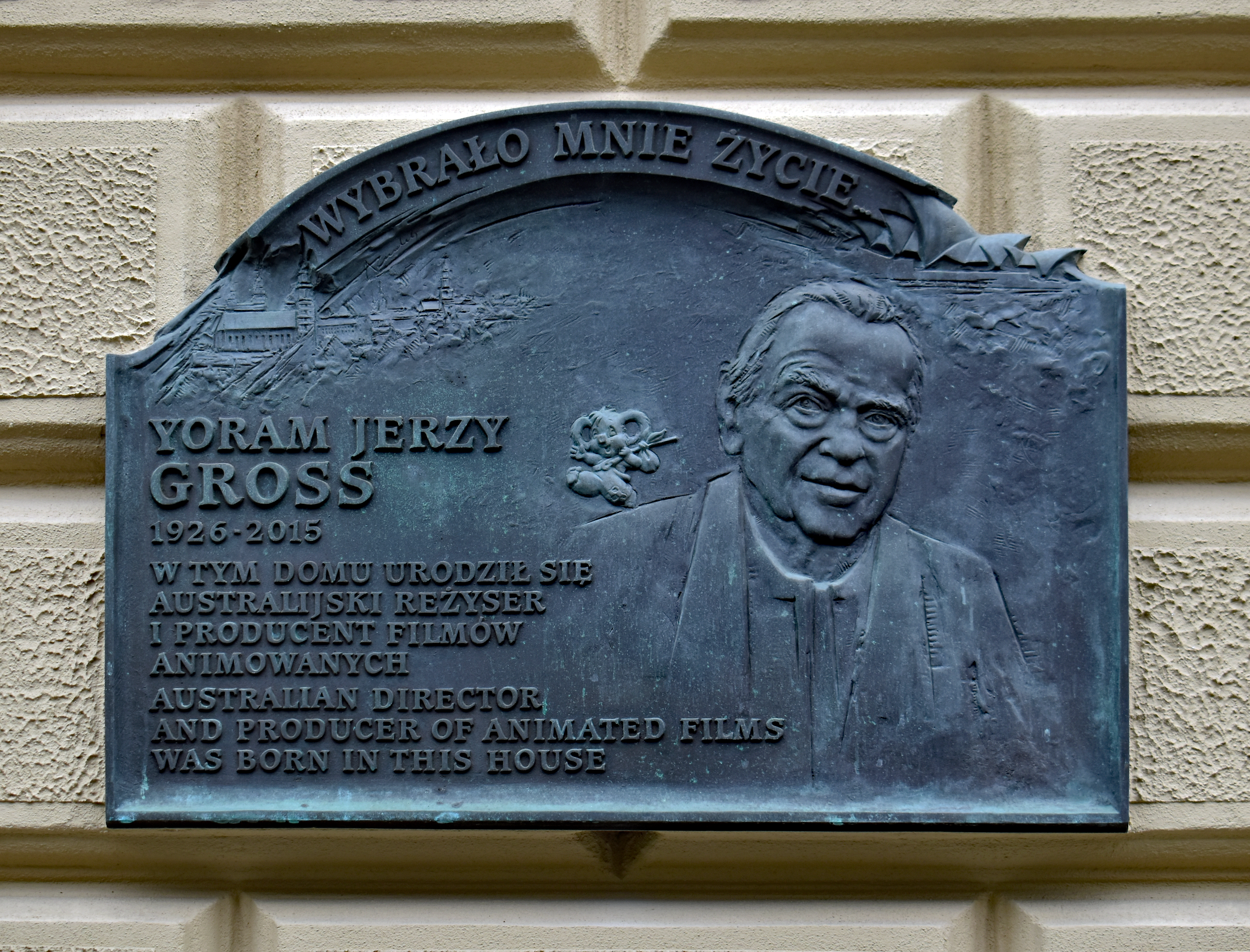
Commemorative plaque. 12 Sarego Street, Kraków, Poland

Yoram Jerzy Gross AM (18 October 1926 – 21 September 2015) was a Polish-Australian filmmaker. He founded the animation studio Flying Bark Productions.

He was known for his adaptation of children's characters from books and films, and best known for the production of the films Dot and the Kangaroo and Blinky Bill: The Mischievous Koala.

== Early life and education ==
Yoram Jerzy Gross was born on 18 October 1926 in Kraków, Poland to a religious Jewish family and was the younger brother of the film director Natan Gross.

Gross endured World War II under the Nazi regime. His family was on Oskar Schindler's list, but chose to make their own risky escape, moving hiding places 72 times.

Gross studied music and musicology at the Jagiellonian University in Krakow (also known as Krakow University). He first entered the film industry in 1947 at the age of 20 when he became one of the first students of Jerzy Toeplitz (founder of the Polish Film Institute, the Swiss Film Institute, and the Australian Film and Television School).

== Early career ==
Gross began his career as an assistant to Polish directors Eugene Cenkalski and Leonard Buczkowski as well as the Dutch director Joris Ivens and studied script writing under Carl Foreman.

In 1950 Gross moved from Poland to Israel, where he worked as a newsreel and documentary cameraman. He then became an independent film producer and director and began winning prizes at international film festivals.

His full-length feature, Joseph the Dreamer (1962), a biblical story, received special prizes in many countries. His experimental film Chansons Sans Paroles (1958) was heralded by some international film critics as the most interesting film of 1959. Another comedy, One Pound Only (1964), set the box office record of the year.

== Australian career ==
In 1967 Gross, his wife Sandra and young family migrated to Australia and lived in Sydney. They established Yoram Gross Film Studio in their house, as remote workers. Gross continued to make experimental films and to win awards. He originally produced film clips for the popular weekly television music program Bandstand for such artists as John Farnham. At the Sydney Film Festival in 1970, he was awarded second prize for The Politicians in the category of best Australian-made film, and at the 1971 Australian Film Awards, his film To Nefertiti won the bronze award.

=== Animated films and TV series ===
After 1977 Gross devoted his energies to animated films and series, but maintained an interest in experimental films with awards to assist young filmmakers including the Yoram Gross Award for Best Animated Film at the Sydney Film Festival and the Yoram Gross Best Animation Award at the Flickerfest International Film Festival. Gross wrote a book on making animated films, titled The First Animated Step (1975) and produced a film of the same title.

==== Dot series ====
The first animated feature film produced by the Yoram Gross Film Studio, called Dot and the Kangaroo (1977), used a special aerial image technique of drawings over live action backgrounds. The film was based on an Australian classic best seller by Ethel Pedley, and was described by ABC film critic John Hinde as a "brilliant technical success and the best cartoon film originated in Australia". It won Best Children's Film in Tehran and also won a Sammy Award for the Best Animated Film at the 1978 Australian Film Institute Television Awards.

Gross went on to produce, direct, and script a total of 16 feature films for 19 children. Eight films featuring the adventures of Dot from the original film Dot and the Kangaroo. Dot and the Bunny (1984) was the winner of the 1983 Best Animated Film at the 28th Asia Pacific Film Festival, and Dot and Keeto (1985) won the Red Ribbon Award at the 1986 American Film and Video Festival.

Coinciding with the release of the films, Gross also published books based on the films Dot and the Kangaroo, The Little Convict and Save the Lady.

==== Magic Riddle ====
Gross's 1991 animated film The Magic Riddle was based on an original story and is a mixture of fairy tales from Hans Christian Andersen, the Brothers Grimm, and others.

==== Blinky Bill ====
In 1992 Gross released Blinky Bill: The Mischievous Koala, based on the Australian children's classic by Dorothy Wall. This film featured an Australian koala and introduced Blinky Bill to an international audience. Blinky Bill generated one of Australia's most successful merchandising programs, bringing in millions of dollars in export earnings.

In 1993 Yoram Gross Film Studio diversified into animated series for television. The first two of the Blinky Bill series, The Adventures of Blinky Bill and Blinky Bill's Extraordinary Excursion, totalled 52 half-hour episodes and achieved significant international success, particularly in Europe.

After Blinky Bill, Gross co-produced the series Tabaluga (26 half hours) with EM.TV & Merchandising AG, which became a top-rated children's show in Germany. An animated series adapting Australia's best-known kangaroo, Skippy, was completed in 1998, whereupon the studio commenced the animation of Flipper & Lopaka. Both series respectively comprise 26 and 78 half-hour episodes.

=== Later career ===
In March 1999, EM.TV a 50% share ownership in Yoram Gross-Village Roadshow acquired from Village Roadshow Limited and rebranded itself to Yoram Gross-EM.TV (YGEM). This new partnership marked the transition from a family business to a world brand. EM.TV and YGEM committed to the production of 10 new series over the next five years.

In the following year the studio worked with the Canadian Nelvana to plan an animated adaptation of Dav Pilkey's Dumb Bunnies.

The new millennium cemented Gross and EM.TV's position as the number-one family entertainment business in the Australian country and supplier of quality children's content to the world. The studio completed a second series of both Tabaluga and Flipper and Lopaka, as well as a brand new series, Old Tom.

The Seven Network programmed a dedicated block of television produced by Yoram Gross – a fulfilment of its commitment to screen quality 'C classified' drama for children. Gross and EM.TV also launched the Junior TV channel in Germany, but shut down in many years later.

Gross's autobiography, My Animated Life, was released in April 2011.

== Death ==
Gross died in Sydney at the age of 88 on 21 September 2015.

== Honours and recognition ==
Gross won more than 80 international awards for his various films, and was honoured in the 1995 Australia Day Honours with a Member of the Order of Australia for his services to the Australian film industry, particularly in animation techniques.

In May 2007, Gross celebrated his 60th anniversary in the film industry. In recognition of the milestone, the New South Wales Film and Television Office honoured him by hosting a special retrospective screening of his career highlights, including the screening of Gross's most recent project, Autumn in Krakow, a poignant short film on his home town of Kraków, based on his late brother Nathan's poetry. In 2011, Gross was awarded the Commander's Cross with Star of the Order of Merit of the Republic of Poland and the Medal for Merit to Polish Culture – "Gloria Artis".

The Yoram Gross Animation Award, sponsored by his wife Sandra and son Guy Gross, is given to an Australian short film at the Sydney Film Festival each year. As of 2025 the prize is worth A$7,000 in cash, and winners are 'Academy Award eligible'. For users in four countries: Australia, Greece, Germany, and Israel, a Google Doodle was made for what would have been his 95th birthday to celebrate his life and works.

== Filmography ==
=== Feature films ===
Year	Title	Notes
1962	Joseph the Dreamer	
1964	One Pound Only	
1977	Dot and the Kangaroo	
1979	The Little Convict	AKA Toby and the Koala
1981	Around the World with Dot	AKA Dot and Santa Claus
1982	Sarah	AKA Sarah (The Seventh Match) and Sarah and the Squirrel
1983	Dot and the Bunny	
1984	The Camel Boy	
1984	Epic	AKA Epic: Days of the Dinosaur
1985	Dot and the Koala	
1986	Dot and Keeto	
1986	Dot and the Whale	
1987	Dot and the Smugglers	AKA Dot and the Bunyip
1987	Dot Goes to Hollywood	
1991	The Magic Riddle	
1992	Blinky Bill: The Mischievous Koala	
1994	Dot in Space	
1999	Skippy Saves Bushtown	
2005	Tabaluga and Leo	
2005	Blinky Bill's White Christmas	
2006	Flipper & Lopaka: The Feature	
2007	Gumnutz: A Juicy Tale	
2010	Santa's Apprentice	
2011	Blinky & Me	
2015	Blinky Bill the Movie	

=== TV series ===
- Bright Sparks (1989)
- The Adventures of Blinky Bill (1993)
- Blinky Bill's Extraordinary Excursion (1995)
- Samuel and Nina (1996–1997)
- Tabaluga (1997–2004)
- Skippy: Adventures in Bushtown (1998–1999) (also known as Skippy: Adventures in Bushland)
- Dumb Bunnies (1998–1999) (with Nelvana)
- Flipper and Lopaka (1999–2005)
- Fairy Tale Police Department (2001–2002)
- Old Tom (2001–2002)
- Bambaloo (2003–2004) (with The Jim Henson Company)
- Art Alive (2003–2005)
- Seaside Hotel (2003–2005)
- Blinky Bill (2004)
- Dive, Olly, Dive! (2005) (with Mike Young Productions)
- Deadly (2005–2006)
- Staines Down Drains (2006–2011)
- Master Raindrop (2008–2009)
- Legend of Enyo (2009–2010)
- Zigby (2009–2013)
- Zeke's Pad (2010)
- Vic the Viking (2013–2014)
- Tashi (2014–2015)
- Heidi (2015) (final project)

=== Short films ===
- Chansons Sans Paroles (1958)
- Song Without Words (1958)
- Hava Nagila (1959)
- We Shall Never Die (1959)
- Bon Appetit (1969)
- Barry Crocker's Danny Boy (1970)
- Janice Slater's Call It What You May (1970)
- John Farnham's One (1970)
- The Politicians (1970)
- To Nefertiti (1971)
- Seasons (1972)
- Sun (1975)
- Professor Filutek (1999)
- The Naked Tree (2003)
- Autumn in Krakow (2007)
- Fuchsia Ballerinas (2007)
- Young Musicians (2007–2008)
- Don't Forget... (2010)
- Why... (2010)
- Forest Holocaust (2011)
- Sentenced to Death (2011)
- The Liar (2012)
- Kaddish (2013)
