= Dot in Space =

1994 Australian animated film

- Film poster
- Directed by: Yoram Gross
- Screenplay by: John Palmer
- Based on: Dot and the Kangaroo by Ethel Pedley
- Produced by: Yoram Gross
- Starring: Robyn Moore; Keith Scott
- Edited by: Y. Jerzy, John Hill
- Music by: Guy Gross
- Production company: Yoram Gross Studios
- Distributed by: Magna Pacific
- Release date: 19 June 1994
- Running time: 63 minutes
- Country: Australia
- Language: English

Dot in Space is a 1994 Australian animated film directed by Yoram Gross, and the eighth sequel to the 1977 film Dot and the Kangaroo. While all of the previous films in the Dot film series were screened in the United States, Dot in Space rarely makes any releases outside its home country.

== Plot ==
Dot sees a Russian dog called Whyka being launched into space on TV, only for Whyka's rocket to become trapped in orbit. Dot decides to rescue the dog and travels to America where she trades places with Buster the monkey who was due to be sent to the moon.

Once Dot's rocket is launched, she narrowly manages to rescue Whyka before the dog's rocket explodes. The resulting shockwave sends them off-course and they crash-land on the planet Pie-Arr-Squared. The planet's local soldiers, called the Roundies, quickly capture them. Dot is tied up and gagged and taken to the Roundies' tyrannical leader Papa Drop, who gives Whyka to his son Roley. Dot is taken away for interrogation and finally thrown into the Prison for Squares.

Dot befriends a prisoner called Poley who explains that the Roundies and Squaries once co-existed peacefully. Dot endures several days of slave labor before employing various tactics to trick the Roundies into releasing her and reuniting with Whyka.

Unable to use their rocket to escape to Gorgo Mountain as it is stuck in the ground where they crash-landed, Dot and Whyka head off in search of The Party, a mysterious entity whom Papa Drop believes to be plotting to overthrow him. They encounter many dangers and are pursued by the Roundy Army.

Dot and Whyka are eventually recaptured, but are saved when an alien dinosaur called Gorgo scares the Roundies away. This draws the attention of The Party, who forms a rebellion with Dot, Whyka and the reformed Roundy soldiers and they head back to challenge Papa Drop. They proceed to expose Papa Drop as a fraud and free the Squaries. The Party turns out to be Roley in disguise and Papa Drop's assistant Inflato pumps him up until he floats away into space. Gorgo rescues Dot's rocket, allowing her and Whyka to blast off and return to Earth.

== Cast ==
- Robyn Moore as:
  - Dot (a young, perpetually barefoot, red-headed Australian girl who loves animals)
  - Dosey Face (a lazy, good natured kangaroo)
  - Poley (a Squarey prisoner on the planet Pie-Arr-Squared and Roley's love interest)
  - Misc.
- Keith Scott as:
  - Grumblebones (a grumpy, pessimistic kangaroo)
  - Buster (a monkey that trades places with Dot)
  - Papa Drop (the evil dictator of the planet Pie-Arr-Squared and leader of the Roundies)
  - Roley (Papa Drop's rebellious son and Poley's love interest)
  - Professor Globus (a Roundy scientist)
  - Inflato (one of Papa Drop's servants)
  - Sergeant (commander of the Roundy Army with possible intentions of overthrowing Papa Drop himself)
  - The Roundy Soldiers
  - Misc.

== Cancelled U.S. release ==
Unlike the previous Dot films, many American distributors declined distribution rights of Dot in Space for the North American release on any format, nor was it even released anywhere outside its home country originally. To date, its only official home video release remains an Australian-exclusive release on DVD (Region 4 format), along with re-releases of the other Dot films, in 2014.

Despite never being officially released outside of Australia, though as seems to be the case with the other Dot films (including the first one), the copyright for Dot in Space in the U.S., in particular, is unclear despite being released well after the enactment of the Copyright Act of 1976.
