= Staines Down Drains =

- Title card
- Genre: Children's; Comedy horror Fantasy
- Created by: Jim Mora; Brent Chambers
- Written by: David Witt; Nicholas Searle; Phil Sanders; David Evans; Jim Mora; Anthony Watt; Brendan Luno; Greg Millin
- Directed by: Jane Schneider; Guy Gross
- Voices of: Sarah Aubrey; Keith Scott; Drew Forsythe; Jane U'Brien; Rachel King
- Composer: Michael Lira
- Countries of origin: Australia; New Zealand; Germany
- Original languages: English; German
- No. of seasons: 1
- No. of episodes: 26

Production
- Executive producers: Brent Chambers; Sandra Gross; Geoff Watson; Susanne Schosser
- Producers: Yoram Gross; Brent Chambers
- Running time: 24 minutes
- Production companies: Flux Animation; Flying Bark Productions; Studio 100; Traction; EM.TV; NZ on Air

Original release
- Network: Seven Network
- Release: 15 October 2006 – 2007

Staines Down Drains is a co-produced children's television series created by Jim Mora and Brent Chambers. The series was premiered on the Seven Network in October 2006 and broadcast in New Zealand on TV2 beginning on 28 February 2007. A second series of 13 episodes was announced in 2009, but was never produced.

== Synopsis ==
The series follows siblings Stanley and Mary-Jane Staines as they travel through a portal down their sink in the basement to Drainland. There they assist Vegety Bill (a strong mutant carrot), Blobert (a purple blob) and Herk (a brown hairball) in defeating Dr. Drain. Stanley is germaphobic while Mary-Jane is brave. Their mother Betty is always getting a new job which usually causes the complication in the episodes. Their arch enemy Gretel is always trying to embarrass the Staines.

== Production ==
The series was created by Jim Mora at Hothouse Production and Brent Chambers at Flux Animation for Traction Inc., and produced in traditional animation by Flying Bark Productions and Flux, with assistance from distributor Studio 100. Voices were provided by Sarah Aubrey, Keith Scott, Drew Forsythe, Jane U'Brien, and Rachel King. The music was composed by Michael Lira; the theme song won an APRA-AGSC Screen Music Award for Best Television Theme, while Lira's score for the episode "Pipe Dreams" was nominated for the award for Best Music for Children's Television.

The first season was broadcast in November 2006, with each episode running for 24 minutes. The series was bought by foreign markets and sold internationally. A New Zealand dub was also produced, with the Staines family's voices redubbed with Tara Maher, Michèle A'Court and Jackie Clarke. A second season was announced in late 2009, with each episode running for 11 minutes. This season was to be animated in Adobe Flash. The voice cast for this season included Maher, A'Court, Clarke, Richard Simpson, David Weatherley, and Frank Whitten. The second season was slated for completion at the end of 2010, but was later cancelled for unknown reasons. Only one episode from the season, "Fool's Gold", survives online. The episode features Chesdale mascots Ches and Dale.

== Main characters ==
- Stanley Staines is a germaphobic 11-year-old boy who tries to avoid doing anything out of the ordinary, as his phobia may stop him from going to Drainland. However, he is encouraged by his sister, Mary-Jane, along with Herk and Blobert. Voiced by Sarah Aubrey (Australia); Tara Maher (New Zealand).
- Mary-Jane Staines is a brave 9-year-old girl who is very adventurous and smart. She usually helps her brother, Stanley in solving Drainland's problems. She is worst enemies with Gretel and the two usually argue with each other. Voiced by Rachel King (Australia); Michèle A'Court (New Zealand).
- Betty Staines is Stanley and Mary-Jane's somewhat dipsy mother. She is always starting a new career and usually messes up doing it. Voiced by Jane U'Brien (Australia); Jackie Clarke (New Zealand).
- Vegety Bill is an heroic mutant carrot who is dedicated to protecting the Drainworld plants. He is best friends with Herk and Blobert, and together they fight Dr. Drain and the Gobblers. Voiced by Keith Scott (Australia); David Weatherley (New Zealand; episodes 14-26).
- Blobert is a small one-eyed purple blob who moves around like a slug. He is not very smart and usually helps Herk and Vegety. Voiced by Keith Scott (Australia); Richard Simpson (New Zealand; episodes 14-26).
- Herk is a small brown hairball who helps Vegety in protecting the plants. He is best friends with Blobert. Voiced by Jane U'Brien (Australia); Michèle A'Court (New Zealand; episodes 14-26).
- Dr. Drain is an evil dictator, bent on destroying Drainland and building an empire on its ruins. With his companions the Gobblers, he tries to rid Drainland of its purifying plants. Voiced by Drew Forsythe (Australia); David Weatherley (New Zealand; episodes 14-26).
- Gretel is the arch-enemy of Mary-Jane. She is a spoilt girl who usually bullies the Staines, and is the leader of the local gang called the Lupin Lupes, also consisting of her friends, Jack Lupe and Twinky Lupe. Voiced by Sarah Aubrey.
- The Gobblers (Beef, Beanz and Bratwusrt) are the henchmen of Dr. Drain. Voiced by Drew Forsythe, Rachel King and Keith Scott (Australia); Richard Simpson, Michèle A'Court and David Weatherley (New Zealand; episodes 14-26).
- Jack Lupe and Twinky Lupe are brothers and friends of Gretel. Voiced by Drew Forsythe and Keith Scott.

== Episodes ==
No.	Title	Original release date
1	"Drainland Unplugged"	October 15, 2006
Stanley and Mary-Jane view their new home and soon find a sink in their basement which leads to civilization, called Drainland. They soon discover mutant monsters, some of which are friendly.
2	"Once More Unto the Drains"	TBA
Stanley starts his first day at school along as Mary-Jane is pretending sick at home, she soon decides to travel down the portal to Drainland again, however she soon finds herself being chased for stealing a Cleansing Sea plant, meanwhile Stanley travels down again to rescue his sister from a large amount of acid which was tipped down the sink.
3	"Meet Dr. Drain"	TBA
Betty has taken the job of a comedian, though her jokes are anything but funny. Meanwhile Dr. Drain hears about an Olympic-like event going on and has the Gobblers steal the trophy, but Stanley and Mary-Jane notice and pursue the terrible-trio. Stanley, upon donning a Dr. Drain costume, gets mistaken for the villain by the Gobblers, until they see the real one right beside Stanley. The Gobblers couldn't tell them apart (not even by size) until Dr. Drain revealed himself by threatening his lackeys, and he and Stanley officially meet face-to-face. Luckily Stanley gets the trophy back and saves his mom from sheer embarrassment.
4	"Land of the Giants"	TBA
Stanley tries to find his sister after overhearing a plan to cover her in chocolate and feathers by the Lupin Lunes, searching in Drainland, he finds Dr. Drain with a growing potion, however eager to find Mary-Jane, Stanley leaves though he can not go out the drain portal after his mother blocks it.
5	"A Ring Thing"	TBA
The duo accidentally drop one of Betty's wedding-rings down the drains, so they have to go find and retrieve it as soon as possible. Meanwhile Dr. Drain again tries to destroy the purifying-plants so he can rule the sewers with an iron fist, and believes Betty's ring is the key to do it.
6	"Choo Choo Drain"	TBA
Stanley and Mary-Jane's teacher has the school clean up a toxic waste dump, but Dr. Drain then steals the waste to use it in another takeover attempt. Their skirmishing however has caused the train carrying the waste to go out of control, and worse, Gretel and the Lupe brothers are caught in it too.
7	"Glass Bowl of Love"	TBA
It's Stanley's birthday, and Mary-Jane got him a goldfish, which Stanley vows to keep safe by any means necessary. Unfortunately Betty accidentally got the fish to fall into Drainland, and he has to get it back before Mary-Jane knows it, but this wasn't the first goldfish Stanley sent into Drainland.
8	"All Dug Up"	TBA
A pothole in a sidewalk is threatening Drainland. Stanley has to help the populace while Mary-Jane tries to prevent the construction of the sidewalk the pothole is at, but Dr. Drain has other ideas.
9	"Vanity Hair"	TBA
Stanley's lunchbox is threatened by Gretel, who vows to win it in a spelling competition. At the same time, a ravenous hairy caterpillar has become abundant. Naturally Dr. Drain hopes to use the caterpillar on the purifying-plants.
10	"In the Soup"	TBA
Vegety Bill discovers a mysterious liquid seeping into the cleansing sea and worries after Dr. Drain's minions go after the recipe to create more, however they do not realize until later the liquid is Mrs. Staines' soup, which is to be served for lunch, much to Mary-Jane and Stanley's despair.
11	"No Butts"	TBA
Dr. Drain hires a trio of cigarette butts to perform near the cleansing sea, so with their bad breath and brainwashing abilities, they can destroy the plants. Meanwhile, Stanley and Mary-Jane attempt to stop a new soft-drink brand that makes people hyperactive.
12	"Fighting Fit"	TBA
Stanley auditions in a dance-show. Meanwhile a yogurt-humanoid has arrived in Drainland and becomes an exercise-trainer, but it turns out she's a yogurt that's high in fat and is ashamed of it.
13	"Nappy Days"	TBA
After Stanley loses Gretel's little baby cousin Thing down the drain, he travels down the portal to bring him back; however with the baby destroying the cleansing sea and Dr. Drain wanting the baby to complete his evil plan, Stanley with Vegety, Blobert and Herk must hurry. Meanwhile, Mary-Jane fills in for Thing, much to her despair.
14	"Halloween"	TBA
Mary Jane wants to make this Halloween memorable, partially to spite Gretel and the Lupin brothers, and the Drainland-trio take part in the holiday, but the lunch-lady is hunting them. Meanwhile the purifying plants have spawned diamonds (actually diamond-shaped seeds), causing Dr. Drain to value them, much to the Gobblers' dismay.
15	"Freeze a Jolly Good Fellow"	TBA
Herk has a nightmare about a glove, and Gretel throws Stanley's lucky-glove into a drain (and the glove just so happens to look like Herk's nightmare one). Dr. Drain has put Drainland into an Ice Age to remove the purifying-plants.
16	"Slime Time"	TBA
Stanley wants to play soccer without getting dirty, so he tries buying a slime-eating slug to clean up the school's showers. While this worked, the slug escaped to Drainland and threatens the purifying-plants, something Dr. Drain hopes to take advantage of.
17	"Inner Space"	TBA
Stanley has accidentally put Herk in Blobert's stomach and has to go in to save the former, but Dr. Drain has turned one Gobbler into a Blobert-doppelganger which interferes by having the real Blobert kidnapped.
18	"Hair Today"	TBA
Betty has created a strange potion that gives crazy hairstyles, while Dr. Drain has created a hair-removal potion that leaked into a public pool and turned all kids (except the Staines siblings) bald, and plugs up the drainage outlets with the robbed hair to flood Drainland.
19	"Unwelcome Guest"	TBA
Betty invites Gretel to stay at the Staines' house, where she takes advantage to turn the siblings against each other. At the same time a fourth Gobbler named Basil arrives and proves to be better and more greedy. Worse, Herk gets amnesia.
20	"Dentures of Death"	TBA
A living false-teeth monster has arrived and Dr. Drain tries to use it on the purifying-plants, and Stanley tries to avoid going to the dentist. Mary-Jane makes Betty more competent, but it backfires.
21	"Going for Gold"	TBA
The whole town tries searching for gold after numerous reports, however, it is all part of an elaborate plan by Dr. Drain, however, Stanley and his friends discover his scheme and try to stop him.
22	"Pipe Dreams"	TBA
The Drainland inhabitants are preparing to hibernate, except Dr. Drain when he finds some coffee to keep the Gobblers awake. Meanwhile Betty has become a cleanliness-themed warrior, but has failed to sleep, and when she does, she sleeps walks herself into Drainland, and Dr. Drain is in love with her.
23	"Kidnapped"	TBA
The lunch-lady has gotten every teacher sick from eating her rotten cake, and is put in charge of the school. The cake gets sent to Drainland, which makes the Gobblers bigger than normal, so they kidnap her to keep their new size permanent. In the lunch-lady's absence, Gretel takes over the school.
24	"The Queen and I"	TBA
Dr. Drain has disguised himself as a queen to infiltrate a toy-factory and steal its chemicals to kill the purifying-plants. Stanley was able to save the plants with a special liquid, but it also bulked them up, and Dr. Drain isn't giving up.
25	"Unmasked"	TBA
After being bested yet again, Dr. Drain decides to get the Gobblers sick so they'll infect the purifying-plants and eliminate them. The only cure is chicken soup, but one ingredient is being eradicated. While searching for said ingredient, Stanley and Mary-Jane find out about Dr. Drain's past, including one thing that breaks Stanley's heart.
26	"The Final Flush"	TBA
With Dr. Drain's access to Drainland gone, it seems he's defeated for good, but he's no quitter: he finds the Staines' sink-portal (which he created) and uses baked-beans on the purifying-plants, and Gretel, out of spite, unwittingly gives toxic waste to the villains and unleashes them on the city.
