= Epic (1985 film) =

- Film poster
- Directed by: Yoram Gross
- Written by: John Palmer; Yoram Gross; Greg Flynn
- Produced by: Yoram Gross
- Starring: John Huston; Ross Higgins; Benita Collings; Robyn Moore; Keith Scott
- Music by: Guy Gross
- Production company: Yoram Gross Studios
- Release date: 14 May 1985
- Running time: 70 minutes
- Countries: Australia; United States
- Language: English

Epic (also known as Epic: Days of the Dinosaur) is a 1985 Australian animated children's fantasy adventure action film directed by Yoram Gross and written by John Palmer, Yoram Gross and Greg Flynn, who later called it "a rather Australian film – I can't say very successful, a little bit too much experimental film, too much abstract story."

== Storyline ==
During a massive flood, two children named Sol and Luna are rescued by a family of dingoes, which subsequently raises them as their own. When Sol and Luna come of age, they must go out into the world and collect the "secrets of life", before becoming the new king and queen of the dingoes.

== Voice cast ==
Character	Australia Version	US Version
Narrator	Benita Collings	John Huston

- Ross Higgins
- Robyn Moore
- Keith Scott
