= The Camel Boy =

- Film poster
- Directed by: Yoram Gross
- Written by: Yoram Gross; John Palmer
- Produced by: Yoram Gross
- Starring: Ron Haddrick; Barbara Frawley; John Meillon; Robyn Moore; Michael Pate
- Edited by: Christopher Plowright
- Music by: Bob Young
- Production company: Yoram Gross Studios
- Release date: 8 May 1984
- Running time: 72 minutes
- Country: Australia
- Language: English

The Camel Boy is a 1984 Australian animated feature film by Yoram Gross.

== Plot ==
Young Ali and his camel-driver grandfather Moussa take part in an expedition through the Australian Outback. Faced with prejudice, Moussa's knowledge and the hardiness of his camels in the punishing conditions quickly prove vital to both the success of the expedition and the survival of its members.

== Cast ==
- Barbara Frawley
- John Meillon
- Robyn Moore
- Michael Pate
- Ron Haddrick as O'Connell
