= Sarah (film) =

- 1985 VHS cover
- Directed by: Yoram Gross; Athol Henry
- Written by: Elizabeth Kata
- Produced by: Yoram Gross
- Starring: Mia Farrow; Joan Bruce; John Faassen; Ron Haddrick; Shane Porteous
- Narrated by: Mia Farrow
- Music by: Vivaldi
- Production company: Yoram Gross Films
- Release date: 1982
- Running time: 70 minutes
- Country: Australia
- Language: English

Sarah (also known as Sarah (The Seventh Match) and Sarah and the Squirrel) is a 1982 Australian animated drama film. It was written by Elizabeth Kata and directed by Yoram Gross.

Unlike Yoram Gross's other works, Sarah deals with more mature subjects.

== Plot ==
The story is about a young girl during the beginning of the Second World War. When the German soldiers invade, she and her family are forced to hide in the woods. When her grandmother gets sick, her father goes into town for medicine and disappears. Sarah goes out to pick berries and when she returns, the rest of her family is gone. Sarah is forced to survive alone in the woods with only the animals for company. One day she sees some resistance fighters attempt to destroy a bridge the Nazis use to transport weapons. When their attempt fails, she decides to destroy the bridge herself, hoping that her actions may end the war. Over time she is successful, but afterwards sadly realizes that what she has done will not end the war and walks away into the forest.

== Voices ==
- Mia Farrow – Sarah
- Joan Bruce
- John Faassen
- Ron Haddrick
- Shane Porteous

== See also ==
- List of animated feature films
- Grave of the Fireflies, a Japanese animated film that deals with a similar subject.
