= Joseph the Dreamer (film) =

1962 Israeli animated film

- Theatrical release poster
- Directed by: Yoram Gross; Alina Gross
- Written by: Natan Gross
- Produced by: Yoram Gross
- Music by: Eddie Halperin
- Production company: Yoram Gross Films
- Release date: 1962
- Running time: 80 minutes
- Country: Israel
- Language: Hebrew

Joseph the Dreamer (Hebrew: בעל החלומות, translit. Ba'al Hahalomot) is a 1962 stop-motion animated drama film by Yoram Gross in his directorial debut. It is the first animated film produced in Israel. It tells the story of Joseph from the Bible.

== Production ==
The film was produced with home-made puppets from a script by Gross' brother. Part of the budget came from the Israel Film Commission. Gross later recalled:

We had a crew of five people. We receive permission from the municipality to use a storage room as a studio, but in those days the studio lights were so hot that we couldn't film during the day. It was so hot we could only shoot at night, with open windows and doors.

== Reception ==
The film screened at the 1962 Cannes Film Festival under the title Baal Ha Khalomot and competed for the Palme d'Or.

The film was widely seen but was a box office bomb because the majority of the audience were schoolchildren, who only paid a quarter of the normal children's ticket price.

Eleanor Mannikka from The New York Times wrote in her review, "Even with the advanced techniques of a major Hollywood studio -- absent here -- the concept of combining this mode of expression with religious heroes might have been too great a challenge to bring off well. Emphasis lies in the action here, which is still not enough to replace the value of human facial expressions, gestures, and subtle nuances in conveying a needed depth."

It was re-released in Australia in 2002 with English narration by Keith Scott, as well as additional voices by Scott, Jamie Oxenbould and Rachel King.
