= Dot and the Whale =

- Theatrical release poster
- Directed by: Yoram Gross
- Screenplay by: John Palmer
- Based on: Dot and the Kangaroo by Ethel Pedley
- Produced by: Yoram Gross
- Starring: Robyn Moore; Keith Scott; Kim Deacon
- Cinematography: Graham Sharpe
- Edited by: Rod Hay
- Music by: Guy Gross
- Production company: Yoram Gross Studios
- Distributed by: Hoyts Distribution
- Release dates: October 30, 1986 (Australia); November 10, 1986 (U.S.)
- Running time: 75 minutes
- Country: Australia
- Language: English

Dot and the Whale is a 1986 Australian animated film by Yoram Gross. It is the sixth film to feature the character Dot, originally from the 1977 film Dot and the Kangaroo, which in turn was based on the children's book of the same name by Ethel Pedley.

== Plot ==
The film starts off with a scene from the novel Moby Dick, with a whaler on a stormy sea in the 19th century, chasing "the white whale". It turns out that the scene comes from the imagination of Dot, while she is sitting with the book. She goes out to play with Nelson the dolphin in his pool, and he teaches her how to stay underwater for long periods of time and to communicate underwater, as well as the history and evolution of sea creatures.

While they play together, Nelson hears the wail of a beached whale named Tonga from the local coast, and jumps out of his pool, over the cliff beside, and dives into the ocean on the other side, to check what is going on, with Dot coming along. Dot walks up on land to talk with Tonga, but becomes upset as two boys, Alex and Owen, stand and throw sand on the whale. The boys say that they only want to push the whale back to the sea. Together, they try to push Tonga back to the water, but fail. They decide to gather as many kids as possible, in order to help the whale as much as they can.

While Alex and Owen start to gather help, Dot sits beside Tonga, trying to converse. Tonga explains that her family has been killed by whalers, and she is the only survivor, but has lost the will to live. Dot explains that she and others want to help Tonga, and tries to by having Tonga placed in the same pool as Nelson to let her recover. Dot then realizes that they do not have a transport facility for a whale. Meanwhile, a crooked fishmonger becomes interested in Tonga as a possible "fish" source.

As Dot wonders what she should do, Nelson tells her about Moby Dick the sperm whale (whom he explains actually existed, and is not just a fictional figure), and suggests Dot ask him if he could convince Tonga to return to the sea. Nelson believes that Tonga would obey Moby Dick, as he is a very wise old whale with great influence in the sea. Dot accepts, and they starts their journey to Antarctica, where Moby Dick sometimes sleeps. After a long adventure, Dot and Nelson reach Antarctica and meet the aged and wrinkly whale, but Moby Dick will not ask Tonga to return to the sea. He believes that if Tonga wishes to die, they should let her do so, instead of returning her to the sea and perhaps end up as another victim to whalers. However, due to the kindness of the town's children, Tonga has renewed her desire to stay alive.

Dot returns from the sea and makes up a new plan with Alex and Owen in order to save Tonga, and let her share the pool with Nelson. They start to phone different transportation companies, to see if they could help them to move a whale, but with poor results. As they finally find a company which can help them (in return for a big sum of money), they face the problem of lacking payment. They start a campaign to fund raise, in order to save the whale.

However, the fishmonger decides to steal the collected gain. He succeeds, but is stopped thanks to the boss of the transport company. The following day, Tonga moves to her new home. In a short epilogue, it is explained that Tonga's health improved so much, that she eventually returned to the sea.

== Voice cast ==
- Robyn Moore as:
  - Dot, a young, perpetually barefoot, red-headed Australian girl who loves animals
  - Tonga, a beached whale
  - Alex
  - Misc.
- Keith Scott as:
  - Nelson, a dolphin
  - Owen
  - Moby Dick
  - Misc.
- Kim Deacon - Singer

== Soundtrack ==
The film features an original soundtrack composed mostly by Bob Young and Guy Gross, with the music for two of the four principal songs, "Mother Sea" and "The Whale Song", being written by Young and that for the other two "Fish 'n' Chips" and "Save the Whale", being written by Guy Gross. The lyrics for all four principal songs were written by John Palmer, and performed by Kim Deacon, Robyn Moore and Keith Scott.

== Production ==
Dot and the Whale debuted in the United States on The Disney Channel on November 10, 1986, where it aired until 1993. Dot and the Whale and four other Yoram Gross films were released on VHS by Family Home Entertainment under license from Cori Films Distributors, Ltd. It was later released on DVD (Region 4 format), along with the other Dot films, in 2014.

As seems to be the case with the other Dot films (including the first one), the copyright for Dot and the Whale in the U.S. is unclear despite being released well after the enactment of the Copyright Act of 1976.
