= The Magic Riddle =

1991 Australian animated musical film

- Theatrical release poster
- Directed by: Yoram Gross
- Written by: Yoram Gross (script); Leonard Lee (script); John Palmer (script)
- Produced by: Yoram Gross
- Starring: Robyn Moore; Ross Higgins; Keith Scott
- Edited by: Rod Hay
- Music by: Guy Gross
- Production company: Yoram Gross Films
- Distributed by: Beyond International
- Release date: 19 September 1991
- Running time: 93 minutes
- Country: Australia
- Language: English
- Box office: AUD$1.5 million

The Magic Riddle is a 1991 Australian animated musical feature film written and directed by Yoram Gross. The film tells the story of Cindy, an orphan who lives as an indentured servant to her cruel stepmother, and features elements of famous fairytales including Cinderella, Snow White and the Seven Dwarfs, Little Red Riding Hood, Sleeping Beauty and Pinocchio. Robyn Moore provides the voice of Cindy and various other characters. It was panned by critics and accused of borrowing from several other Disney films.

== Plot ==
Cindy, short for Cinderella, lives with her widowed stepmother and two stepsisters, Bertha and Ertha. Cindy is forced to do all of the housework and is effectively a servant. The widow hates Cindy because, when her late Grandfather died, he hid his will, which the widow knows passes the entire family inheritance to Cindy. The widow purposely keeps Cindy busy so that she won't find the will, giving the widow time to find it first. The widow is also planning to marry her favorite daughter, Bertha, to a handsome young man named Phillipe, though he is smitten with Cindy.

One night, Cindy falls asleep before finishing her chores, but an old lady sneaks into the house to finish the chores for her. Ertha, Cindy's kinder stepsister, encounters the old lady, who reveals that she is Cindy's Grandmother, and was kicked out of the house by the widow after Grandfather died. The same thing happens the following night, but the widow wakes up and chases Grandmother away. Ertha, who witnessed everything, tells Cindy about it.

The widow is afraid that Grandmother will help Cindy find the will. Following the advice of her magic mirror, the widow puts on a salesman disguise and visits Grandmother in the woods, tricking her into entering The Castle of a Hundred Doors, from which there is no escape. Cindy, dressed in a red riding hood, arrives at Grandmother's cottage too late and is chased away by a "wolf", who is actually a widow in disguise.

Cindy sits by a lake, telling her hopes to an ugly duckling, unaware that Phillippe is listening. Phillippe reveals himself and gives her a ring as a token, but their meeting is interrupted by the widow, who orders Cindy to work. While in the barn, Cindy discovers the widow's wolf costume and realizes what happened. Bertha, who is jealous of Cindy, chases the pigs away from the farm and blames Cindy for it. Ertha advises Cindy to escape to Grandmother's cottage, which she does. There Cindy discovers seven wooden dwarfs and one wooden puppet Pinocchio. They come alive when she kisses them, and they tell her that widow took Grandmother away.

The widow wants Cindy back at the house working for her. She discovers Cindy's music box and decides to lure her back by holding a masked ball. Cindy wants to go, as it is a chance to see Phillippe. The dwarfs make her a costume, but warn her that since her mask is made of snow it will melt at midnight. At the ball, Cindy's disguise works and she gets to dance with Phillippe. Meanwhile, Ertha and Pinocchio dance together. When the clock strikes twelve, Cindy's disguise melts and she runs away to escape the widow, her friends following close behind.

When the widow mocks Ertha for falling for Pinocchio, Ertha retaliates by telling Phillippe that Cindy can be found at Grandmother's house. He heads out to find her, but finds the Castle of a Hundred Doors instead. The dwarfs also find the Castle, but they too get lost inside and unable to escape.

The widow goes to the cottage wearing another disguise devised by her magic mirror, this time pretending to be Pinocchio's mother. The widow hypnotises Cindy with a magic apple to fall asleep, and in the commotion the widow accidentally falls into a well. Pinocchio, now alone, searches for help and stumbles upon the Castle. When he enters, one of his shoes is caught on a nail and starts to unravel. Eventually Grandmother is found, and everyone groups up and follows the trail out.

When they arrive back at the cottage, Cindy is woken up by a kiss from Phillippe. Grandmother explains to Cindy about the will, and that the answer is in his Magic Riddle, a poem which ends with: "Only Pinocchio knows". It turns out that the will is inside Pinocchio's nose. Grandmother reads the will, confirming that all of Grandfather's possessions go to Cindy. Cindy and Phillippe's wedding is held at what used to be the widow's house. After the celebrations, the dwarfs and Pinocchio turn back into wood, their task completed, but when Ertha kisses Pinocchio, he comes back to life to be with her.

== Voice cast ==
- Robyn Moore as Cindy, Ertha, Bertha, Grandmother, The Widow, Additional Voices
- Keith Scott as Philippe, Pinocchio, The Seven Dwarfs, The Widow's Wolf Impression, Additional Voices
- Ross Higgins as Philippe's singing voice

== Music ==
1. "When I Was Just a Little Girl"
2. "Cindy Do It Now"
3. "Mean Mean Mean" - The Widow
4. "I Will Find the Will" - The Widow
5. "My Darling Daughters" - The Widow
6. "Sisters Sisters"
7. "Oh Silver Bright Reflection" - The Widow
8. "Now How Did It Go"
9. "Grandma Dear Grandma"
10. "Try Not to Cry So"
11. "Pig Song"
12. "I'm Alive"
13. "Girl in the Snow White Dress"
14. "Cinderella's Wedding Day"
15. "Ordinary Miracles" (plays over end credits) - Julie Anthony

An official soundtrack was released in July 1992 by Alhambra Records, but it features a different song order than the film proper.

1. "Ordinary Miracles" - Julie Anthony
2. "When I Was Just a Little Girl"
3. "I Will Find the Will" - The Widow
4. "Mean Mean Mean" - The Widow
5. "My Darling Daughters" - The Widow
6. "Sisters Sisters"
7. "Cindy Do It Now"
8. "Try Not to Cry So"
9. "Pig Song"
10. "Oh Silver Bright Reflection" - The Widow
11. "Grandma Dear Grandma"
12. "Now How Did It Go"
13. "Girl in the Snow White Dress"
14. "I'm Alive"
15. "Cinderella's Wedding Day"
16. "Instrumental Score Excerpts"

== Release ==
The Magic Riddle was released in Australia on 19 September 1991. The film was also given a theatrical release in the Philippines, with an advanced screening held at the Shangri-La Plaza's The Cinema on 2 January 1994.

=== Box office ===
The Magic Riddle grossed $1,510,536 at the box office in Australia.

=== Reception ===
The film received largely negative reviews from critics, who criticized the screenplay, animation, music and story. It has also been accused of being a blatant rip-off of several Disney films. Despite its critical failure, the film has gained a cult following over the years.
