= Bambaloo =

- Genre: Preschool
- Created by: Donna Andrews; Justine Flynn
- Starring: Angela Kelly; Andre Eikmeier
- Voices of: Emma de Vries; Adam Kronenberg; David Collins; Roslyn Oades
- Theme music composer: Clive Harrison
- Opening theme: "Bambaloo Theme"
- Ending theme: Various ending themes
- Composers: Guy Gross; Abigail Hatherley
- Country of origin: Australia
- Original language: English
- No. of seasons: 2
- No. of episodes: 105

Production
- Executive producers: Lisa Fitzpatrick; Geoff Watson; Angus Fletcher (Season 1); Susan Oliver (Season 2)
- Producers: Susan Oliver (Season 1); Donna Andrews (Season 2)
- Production location: ATN
- Running time: 30 minutes
- Production companies: Yoram Gross-EM.TV; The Jim Henson Company

Original release
- Network: Seven Network; ABC TV
- Release: 3 February 2003 – 25 March 2004

Bambaloo is a children's television program formerly shown on the Seven Network between 2003 and 2007. More recently it has been shown on the ABC and is suitable for 3- to 5-year-olds. The show focuses on song repetition to help children anticipate the next activity. The show was created by famous Australian animator Yoram Gross and The Jim Henson Company for a total of 105 episodes.

== Characters ==
- Fidget the dog
- Jet the fish
- Portia the bird
- Jinx and Gypsy the mice
- Sam the human
- Jake the human
- There are also around 100 guests who get called to tell a story (and teach a lesson) to the Bambaloo tree friends by Jinx and Gypsy.

== Credited cast ==
- Angela Kelly (Sam the human and host)
- Andre Eikmeier (Jake the other human)
- Emma de Vries (puppeteer and voice of Portia)
- Adam Kronenberg (puppeteer and voice of Fidget)
- David Collins (puppeteer and voice of Jinx and Jet)
- Roslyn Oades (puppeteer and voice of Gypsy)

== Production ==
The series was announced in September 2002, when Australian animation studio Yoram Gross-EM.TV entered into the live-action production and formed a partnership with EM.TV's fellow American entertainment company The Jim Henson Company to produce a live-action preschool series entitled Bambaloo, marking Yoram Gross-EM.TV's first live-action production with former Nickelodeon Australia head of programming Donna Andrews and producer Justine Flynn would serve as creators of the series while their company Buster Dandy Productions (which would later produce Five Minutes More two years later in 2006 before merging with Donna Andrews' animation studio Sticky Pictures in January 2010) would serve as co-producer. The Jim Henson Company would handle & create Muppet characters for the series via its London production office and would handle international distribution series while Yoram Gross-EM.TV would handle distribution in Australia and Asia.

When the series was renewed for a season second in 2004, Yoram Gross-EM.TV (who animated the opening sequence for the programme's entire run) took over full production of the series becoming a full-time Australian in-house production after its German parent EM.TV sold its American entertainment company The Jim Henson Company back to the Henson family a year prior back in May 2003 and shuttered its European production operations four months later in September of that year, however The Jim Henson Company's Muppet Workshop in London, England continued providing the puppets for the series' second season.

== Episodes ==
=== Series 1 (2003) ===
No. overall	No. in season	Title	Original release date
1	1	"Monkey Nuts"	3 February 2003
2	2	"Puppy Love"	4 February 2003
3	3	"Fame Game"	5 February 2003
4	4	"Rhinestone Cowbird"	6 February 2003
5	5	"Hot Treat Cold Treat"	7 February 2003
6	6	"Bird in a Flap"	10 February 2003
7	7	"A Whiffy Sniff"	11 February 2003
8	8	"Little Fish, Big Noise"	12 February 2003
9	9	"Biscuit Bandits"	13 February 2003
10	10	"A Nutty Treat"	14 February 2003
11	11	"Forest Friend"	17 February 2003
12	12	"Fly Me to the Moon"	18 February 2003
13	13	"King Jet"	19 February 2003
14	14	"Best Crest"	20 February 2003
15	15	"Pet for a Knight"	21 February 2003
16	16	"Fast or Last"	24 February 2003
17	17	"Bottle Full of Sun"	25 February 2003
18	18	"Jungle Japes"	26 February 2003
19	19	"Seeing is Believing"	27 February 2003
20	20	"It's Laughter We're After"	28 February 2003
21	21	"The Prezzie Pixie"	3 March 2003
22	22	"The Twinkling Bush"	4 March 2003
23	23	"Grow Your Own"	5 March 2003
24	24	"Star Fish"	6 March 2003
25	25	"Dagnabbit!: That Dog's a Rabbit"	7 March 2003
26	26	"Go Slow"	10 March 2003
27	27	"Fly By"	11 March 2003
28	28	"From Here to Reindeer"	12 March 2003
29	29	"Fidget's Smoky Mountain"	13 March 2003
30	30	"Game for a Laugh"	14 March 2003
31	31	"Woodland Warble"	17 March 2003
32	32	"Bat Nap"	18 March 2003
33	33	"Super Jet"	19 March 2003
34	34	"Belle of the Bug Ball"	20 March 2003
35	35	"The Sheep Show"	21 March 2003
36	36	"Night Flight Fright!"	22 March 2004
37	37	"The Hottest Spot"	23 March 2004
38	38	"The Lost Treasure Hunt"	24 March 2004
39	39	"All Together Now"	25 March 2004

== Songs ==
- Coming Home
- Animal Boogie
- I Can Fly
- A To B
- It's Hot Hot Hot
- Tell Me
- Look Around
- Funny Sounds
- Time For A Change
- Creepy Crawlies
- Everything Around Us
- The World Is Turning
- Directions
- Let's Celebrate
