= Skippy: Adventures in Bushtown =

Australian animated television series

- Title card
- Genre: Animated series
- Based on: Skippy the Bush Kangaroo by: John McCallum; Lionel (Bob) Austin; Lee Robinson
- Written by: John Palmer; Paul Lacy; Sally Odgers; Carol Adams
- Directed by: Yoram Gross
- Starring: Jamie Oxenbould; Robyn Moore; Keith Scott
- Music by: Guy Gross
- Opening theme: "Skippy Adventures in Bushtown" by Keith Scott
- Ending theme: "Skippy Adventures in Bushtown" (instrumental)
- Countries of origin: Australia; France; Germany
- Original languages: English; French; German
- No. of seasons: 1
- No. of episodes: 26

Production
- Executive producers: Sandra Gross; Tim Brooke-Hunt
- Producer: Yoram Gross
- Running time: 25 minutes
- Production companies: Yoram Gross-Village Roadshow; International Tele Images; Videal GmbH

Original release
- Network: Nine Network
- Release: 5 September 1998 – 26 February 1999

Skippy: Adventures in Bushtown (also known as Skippy: Adventures in Bushland) is an Australian animated children's series created by Yoram Gross, set in a fictionalised Australian town. It is based on the character Skippy from the 1968 live-action series Skippy the Bush Kangaroo.

It differs from the other Skippy series as it is animated and features anthropomorphic characters. Skippy, for example, is an anthropomorphic, male kangaroo who wears a baseball cap and is depicted as a Park Ranger of the fictional town of Bushtown.

== Premise ==
Skippy the Bush Kangaroo (voiced by Jamie Oxenbould) is a young park ranger who resides in Bushtown. He always happens to get in the way of Mayor Croco, his greedy wife Suka, his pack of goons, and his frequent get-rich schemes which often endanger the town.

== Characters ==
- Skippy: A bush kangaroo and the protagonist. He works as the park ranger of Bushtown. He is a very thoughtful, caring, dutiful, and well-educated sort doing what he can to keep Bushtown in order and its people happy.
- Matilda Roo: A bush kangaroo who casts the news on television around Bushtown and the host of Bushtown Tonight. Usually, she is first on the scene and she's a good friend of Skippy, open to his ideas. In "Bye Bye Birdies", Skippy is implied to have a crush on her.
- Professor Angus McPouch: A Scottish-accented Pelican who invents gizmos to improve progress in Bushtown. Half of his inventions don't always have a successful testing phase.
- Mayor Croco: A crocodile and the primary antagonist. He starts out as a garbage collector and becomes mayor of Bushtown by a pure stroke of luck, but he doesn't do his fair service for the people and regards Skippy as a hindrance to his campaign.
- Damon: A rat and one of Croco's goons who serves as his chauffeur, with a voice based on former Australian Prime Minister Bob Hawke.
- Sirloin: A bull and one of Croco's goons, with a voice-based on Sylvester Stallone.
- Bruiser: A boar and another of Croco's goons, with a voice based on Arnold Schwarzenegger.
- Suka: Croco's spoiled and prissy wife with an obsession for cleanliness.
- Pos: A possum cameraman, with a voice that resembles that of Eddie Murphy. His character design and voice is reused from Slick, who appeared in two episodes of Blinky Bill.
- Bomba: A wombat boom operator for Matilda's shows.
- Mayor Plato Bill: The previous mayor of Bushtown who had been in service for 50 years before Croco.
- Mr. Roge: The recorded producer teaching Suka to sing.
- Mrs. Kooka: a kookaburra and Professor McPouch's maid. Unlike most other female characters, Kooka is voiced by Keith Scott
- Rowdy: a rat is Captain Numbat's assistant.
- Giselle: a koala who wears a magenta dress and a yellow bow. Her character model is a reuse of Myrtle from Blinky Bill.

== Voice cast ==
- Jamie Oxenbould as Skippy, other characters
- Robyn Moore as Matilda, Suka, other characters
- Keith Scott as Mayor Croco, Damon, Bruiser, Sirloin, Pos, Bomba, Professor McPouch, Mrs Kooka, other characters

== Episodes ==
No.	Title	Original release date
1	"Trouble Comes To Bushtown"	5 September 1998
Mayor Bill is retiring. Croco gets money out of the candidates for the crowds he brings to them. The voting event gets out of hand, but when Skippy saves Croco, Ex-Mayor Bill accidentally announces Croco as the mayor.
2	"Hooray for Crocowood"	12 September 1998
When furniture is confiscated by the Bushtown Council Tax Collector for Croco's mansion, Skippy plans to get them back by pretending to shoot a movie there.
3	"Sabotage at Sea"	19 September 1998
Croco tries to put Bushtown's ferry service out of business and replace it with his own.
4	"The Mean Green Queen"	25 September 1998
When Croco hires a waitress to pretend to be a visiting queen, she gives her crown to Suka who goes mad with power
5	"The Big Drought"	2 October 1998
Croco and Suka waste water while Bushtown suffers a horrid drought and Skippy plans to get even while finding water for his friends.
6	"The Oil Crisis"	9 October 1998
MacPouch creates a device that can turn garbage into petrol to deal with Croco constantly raising petrol prices. Sirloin, Bruiser and Damon take spy lessons from a disguised Skippy in order to steal the device.
7	"Invasion of the Robots"	16 October 1998
Professor MacPouch has invented a tree planting robot to fix the damage done by bush fires. Croco replaces his factory workers with robots to fund Sulka's dream opera house, but that causes a financial halt in the business.
8	"Battle of the Pumpkins"	23 October 1998
Suka has MacPouch's plant growth formula stolen to win a pumpkin competition but Sirloin drinks it, making him super smart.
9	"A Town Called Suka"	30 October 1998
Skippy learns that Croco's irrigation system is actually a scam to build a casino.
10	"Dance Fever"	6 November 1998
Skippy hosts a fundraiser to build special shoes for an injured girl, but Croco's schemes threaten to ruin it.
11	"Skippy the Fire Fighter"	13 November 1998
Skippy becomes the new fire chief but Croco steals the fire truck's pump and motor for a fountain for Suka.
12	"Calling Doctor Skippy"	20 November 1998
Skippy discovers that Croco and Suka have used the funds for a new hospital to improve the road to their mansion. Distraught, Skippy devises a set of tricks that convince Croco and Suka that they are in need of a new hospital.
13	"A Fistful of Opals"	27 November 1998
Skippy's old friend Digger Dan digs up in the old mine then the volcano blows sky high with the hot lava but Mayor Croco is up to his old tricks again.
14	"You’re in the Army Now"	4 December 1998
TBA
15	"Run for the Money"	11 December 1998
TBA
16	"The End of the World"	18 December 1998
Croco is told by Captain Shelley of Pearl World that it'll take the end of the world for him to hand over a prize pearl. Croco convinces the citizens that Bushtown is in the path of a comet and Skippy goes into disguise to get the pearl back.
17	"The Sound of Suka"	25 December 1998
Skippy becomes suspicious when Suka, with a voice so bad even her husband Mayor Croco concedes she's absolutely dreadful, is a big hit with her first music video. The magnificent voice, however, is not hers but belongs to Skippy's friend Wallaby, recorded by the unscrupulous music agent Roj.
18	"Underwater Treasure"	1 January 1999
Skippy dresses of Mayor Croco's great antsier Captain McCroc warns Croco the treasure is hunted when Croco and his goons on the submarine to get the treasure.
19	"Suka the TV Star"	8 January 1999
TBA
20	"The Kissing Frog"	15 January 1999
Skippy spots a rare frog at one of Croco's construction sites and Croco tries to get rid of it.
21	"Close Encounters of the Croco Kind"	22 January 1999
TBA
22	"Curse of the Blue Diamond"	29 January 1999
When Croco steals a diamond from an ancient temple, Skippy and friends convince him that he's haunted by a ghostly king.
23	"Skippy's Double Trouble"	5 February 1999
TBA
24	"The First Crocodile on the Moon"	12 February 1999
Croco steals $20 million from farmers affected by a dust bowl to build himself a Moon rocket. Skippy and friends fake his take-off to get back at him.
25	"Bye Bye Birdies"	19 February 1999
TBA
26	"The Kidnap Caper"	26 February 1999
Skippy finds a lost joey which gives Croco the idea to scam Bushtown by pretending Suka's been kidnapped.

== Film ==
- Skippy Saves Bushtown, a feature-length special.

== Video games ==
- Skippy's Cartoon Maker, a PC game.
- Skippy: The Curse of the Temple of Ock
