= Elizabeth Kata =

Australian writer (1912–1998)

Elizabeth Katayama
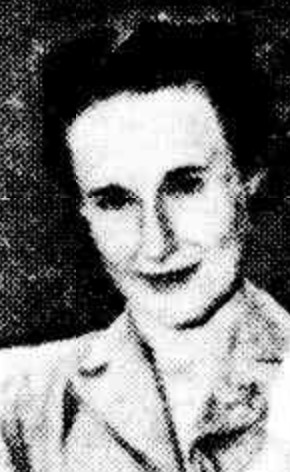
- Elizabeth Katayama, from a 1947 Australian newspaper.
- Born: Elizabeth Colina McDonald; 9 October 1912; Sydney, Australia
- Died: 4 September 1998 (aged 85); Sydney, Australia
- Occupation: Novelist
- Spouse: Shinshiro Katayama
- Writing career
- Pen name: Elizabeth Kata
- Years active: 1959–1989

Elizabeth Colina Katayama (nee McDonald; 9 October 1912 – 4 September 1998) was an Australian writer known by the pseudonym Elizabeth Kata, best known for Be Ready with Bells and Drums (1961), made into the award-winning film A Patch of Blue (1965).

== Biography ==
She was born of Scottish parents in Sydney in 1912. After marrying the Japanese pianist Shinshiro Katayama in 1937, she lived for 10 years in Japan. During the last years of World War II, she was interned at the mountain resort village of Karuizawa, Nagano. She returned to Australia in 1947 with her baby son David, battling the Australian government for permission.

As well as writing novels, she wrote for television and several Hollywood scripts. Her first novel, Be Ready with Bells and Drums (written in 1959, first published in 1961), was produced as the film A Patch of Blue (1965). Guy Green, who directed, adapted Kata's book and his screenplay was nominated for a Writers Guild of America award. After the success of the film, the novel was re-released as A Patch of Blue. The book was for many years included in the "school book list" both in the U.S. and Australia. The book Mrs Katayama and Her Splash of Blue (2010, Independence Jones), covers how Elizabeth Kata's first book became the film A Patch of Blue.

Elizabeth Katayama died at her home in Sydney on September 4, 1998.

== Works ==
- Be Ready with Bells and Drums (1961; re-published as A Patch of Blue)
- Someone Will Conquer Them (1962)
- Look Back in Horror
- Tilda (1979)
- Child of the Holocaust (1980)
- The Death of Ruth (1981)
- With Kisses on Both Cheeks (1981)
- Sarah (1982)
- Kagami (1989)
