= Gumnutz: A Juicy Tale =

- Film poster
- Directed by: Clive Harrison; Margaret Parkes; Jane Schneider
- Written by: John Cook; Phil Sanders
- Produced by: John Cook
- Starring: Jamie Croft; Ines Vaz De Sousa; Keith Scott; Ian Bliss; Shane Withington; Rachel King
- Edited by: Michael O'Rourke
- Music by: Clive Harrison
- Production companies: Flying Bark Productions; Bix Pix Productions; ABC Studios
- Distributed by: Film Finance Corporation Australia
- Release date: 24 December 2007
- Running time: 80 mins
- Country: Australia
- Language: English

Gumnutz: A Juicy Tale is a 2007 Australian animated adventure film directed by Clive Harrison, Margaret Parkes and Jane Schneider. It was released on DVD by Bix Pix Productions and Viva Pictures.

== Plot ==
One morning, it is Claude's first day to work at his Uncle Kelvin's Gumnut Juice Factory. Claude doesn't feel up to it at first. Kelvin receives an order for gumnut juice from the business man Peer Point J. Marino which, if successful, will grant Kelvin's company a contract. The rival Hotshot Charlie, hoping to beat Kelvin to the contract first, sends Franky to steal the secret sweetening formula to fulfill his quota.

Hotshot has the apothecary Bunsen the Cobra analyse the ingredients of the secret formula, but without any success. Hotshot sends his goons (known as the Wedge, consisting of Smash, Squash and Slap) to kidnap Kelvin. Claude finds a lead to Badde Manor, but Kelvin is well hidden. Hotshot gets hold a riddle book which has a clue to the secret formula. Catching wind of this, Claude and Peppa sneak into Badde Manor and copy the riddle, Hot Spot also getting the knowledge.

Claude and Peppa follow the riddle to Darwin Platypus who tells them the secret formula, with Hotshot listening in. Hotshot traps Claude, Peppa and Darwin, but Bunsen defects and rescues them and they return to the Gumnut Juice Factory to begin a large production. Claude is briefly separated from the others, but uses Kelvin's special instrument to rally all the Cicadas for the essential ingredient of the formula.

Claude, his friends and a swarm of Cicadas thwart Hotshot's attempt to destroy the Gumnut Juice Factory, then follow him to Badde Manor to rescue Kelvin, with help from Ghoulie Gilly. Once Kelvin is rescued, Bunsen blows Badde Manor with Hotshot and his goons to the Arctic. After that Kelvin is able to meet Marino's quota and get the contract.

== Characters ==
- Claude - A neurotic and sometimes clumsy orphaned numbat, who is keen on insects. Voiced by Jamie Croft.
- Peppa - A spunky and sporty numbat and Claude's best friend, who is a champion at tennis and hockey. Voiced by Ines Vaz De Sousa.
- Uncle Kelvin - A koala and Claude and Peppa's uncle, who have been in his care since their parents' deaths. He is the owner of the Gumnut Juice Factory and wishes to pass his entrepreneurship to Claude. Voiced by Keith Scott.
- Larry - A genius lizard and Claude and Peppa's friend who works as a mechanic then gets a job of running the Gumnut Juice Factory machinery. Voiced by Ian Bliss.
- Peer Point J. Marino - A ram and business man who places tall orders for Gumnut juice. Voiced by Ian Bliss.
- Hotshot Charlie - A crafty, slick Cockney-accented fox out to steal and monopolise Kelvin's business. He is revealed to be the cause of Claude and Peppa's parents' deaths. Voiced by Ian Bliss.
- Franky - Hotshot's spider servant. Voiced by Ian Bliss.
- Smash, Squash and Slap - A razorback, wombat and feral cat and Hotshot's goons, who work as a trio known as the Wedge.
- Bunsen - A cobra apothecary who attempts to analyze the ingredients of the secret formula, but without any success. He later defects when Hotshot is revealed to be the cause of Claude and Peppa's parents' deaths. Voiced by Ian Bliss.
- Percy - A pelican, who works as a lifeguard, detective, policeman and road official. Voiced by Shane Withington.
- Ghoulie Gilly - A Scottish mouse who lives in a creepy forest and is eventually requested by Claude to help rescue Kelvin. Voiced by Keith Scott.
- Aunt Clara - A British opossum and the mayoress of Gumtree Lane. Voiced by Rachel King.
- Grampala - Claude and Peppa's grandfather who has a short memory for various things. Voiced by Keith Scott.
- Darwin Platypus - A platypus who tells Claude and Peppa the secret formula of the Gumnut juice. Voiced by Ian Bliss.

== Production ==
Gumnutz: A Juicy Tale was produced by Flying Bark Productions (Note: Animators and artists working on the film included Manny Banados, Margaret Parkes, Royce Ramos, Gie Santos, Cindy Scharka, Jocelyn Sy, Abeth De La Cruz, Steve Moltzen, Helen Steele, and Angelica Urbanczyk.) in cooperation with Bix Pix Productions and ABC Studios. Animation and development services were provided by Colorland Animation and RKA The Animation Studio. The film was written by Phil Sanders, based on an idea by John Cook, and directed by Clive Harrison, Margaret Parkes, and Jane Schneider. The film was recorded at Trackdown Studios. Character voices were provided by Jamie Croft, Ines Vaz De Sousa, Keith Scott, Ian Bliss, Shane Withington, and Rachel King, and Harrison composed the soundtrack.

The film was nominated for APRA Music Awards of 2008 as the Best Music for Children's Television, but lost to Animalia.
