= Master Raindrop =

Animated television program

- Countries of origin: Australia; New Zealand; Singapore
- No. of episodes: 26

Production
- Running time: 24 minutes
- Production companies: Flying Bark Productions; EM.Entertainment; Big Communications; Flux Animation Studio; Media Development Authority

Original release
- Network: Seven Network
- Release: June 21, 2008 – February 14, 2009

Master Raindrop is an animated television program produced jointly by Australian, New Zealand and Singaporean companies that first screened on the Australian Seven Network from 21 June 2008 to 14 February 2009. There are 26 episodes of 24 minutes duration.

== Overview ==
The series begins with personifications of two of the five elements, Raindrop (water) and Shao Yen (wood), training with their Master, Yun, in the ancient art of Chitaido. However the strongest leader in the Land of a Thousand Legends, General Bu, upsets the peaceful world by taking Yun to begin his attempt to capture the four elements after Flamo, the fire element, joins him voluntarily. General Bu does this to stop the elements joining and defeating him. Master Raindrop and Shao Yen are soon joined by the other two elements: Jin Hou, the metal element (an anthropomorphic golden monkey), and Niwa, the earth element (a humanoid girl who appears to be made of clay). Together they attempt to rescue Master Yun and travel to the place where the golden dragon was defeated and restore him to power.

== Cast ==
- Josh Anderson as Master Raindrop
- Jane U'Brien as Jin Hou, Red boy and various characters
- Rachel King as Niwa
- Sarah Aubrey as Shao Yen
- Josh Quong Tart as Flamo
- David Francis as Grub
- Brian Meegan as General Bu

== Production ==
The series was produced by Big Communications, Flux Animation Studio, Flying Bark Productions, Media Development Authority, and Southern Star Entertainment. As well as individually by Brent Chambers, Vincent Lim, Geoff Watson and Yasmin McConville. Directed by Susan Oliver, Steve Cooper and Kevin Wotton. It was written by Paul Barber, Kym Goldsworthy, Lisa Hoppe, Brendan Luno, John Mein, Kitty Phipps, Gina Roncoli, James Walker, Anthony Watt, David Witt, Leonard Mah, James Meldrum, Joshua Chiang and Jeff Lawrence. Series one consisted of 26 episodes and was produced in 2008.

== Reception ==
The series has received mixed reviews. It has been accused of copying many of the martial arts and element-related themes in popular children's cartoons like Avatar: The Last Airbender, Xiaolin Showdown and Samurai Jack.

== International broadcasts ==
| Country | Channel | Date of premiere |
|---|---|---|
| Australia | Network Seven | 2008 |
| New Zealand | TV2 | 2009 |
| Serbia | Minimax (TV channel) | 2008 |
| Romania | Minimax (TV channel) | 2011 |
| Sri Lanka | Hiru TV | 2014 |
| India (Tamil Nadu) | Chutti TV | |
| India (Andhra Pradesh&Telangana-> collectively Telugu) | Kushi TV | |
| India (Kerala) | Kochu TV | |
| Slovenia | Minimax (TV channel) | |
| Latin America | Cartoon Network | 2010 |

== Episodes ==
| No. in season | Title | Written by | Original Air Date | Production Name |
|---|---|---|---|---|
| 1 | "Courage" | Gina Roncoli | 21 June 2008 | "Stormy Weather" |
Raindrop and Shao Yen's peaceful lives training under Master Yun at his martial arts academy comes to an end, when the evil General Bu destroys the academy and kidnaps Master Yun.
| 2 | "Loyalty" | Lisa Hoppe | 28 June 2008 | "The Red Lotus/Monastery" |
| 3 | "Humility" | Brendan Luno Anthony Watt | 5 July 2008 | "Finding Niwa/The Jade Trade" |
While fleeing General Bu, the Elements enter a cavern covered in Jade, where they find the glamorous but vain, Jade Princess and her kind and humble handmaiden Niwa. Raindrop kidnaps the Jade Princess assuming she is the Earth Element.
| 4 | "Commitment" | Kitty Phipps | 12 July 2008 | "Shao Yen Blossoms" |
General Bu sets the moon ablaze to create constant daylight, to help him search for the elements at night. Due to this the Moon Goddess, Chang Er, falls to the Earth. Raindrop and Shao Yen go to find Archer Yi, the only person able to extinguish the moon's blaze.
| 5 | "Faith" | James Walker David Witt | 19 July 2008 | "Footsteps of the Dragon" |
The Elements realise that they have to reunite with the fifth Element, Flamo, who is still working with General Bu in the Flying Fortress. During the time of the elements helping a beggar the fortress has taken off.
| 6 | "Co-operation" | Kym Goldsworthy | 26 July 2008 | "Red Boy" |
| 7 | "Honor" | David Witt | 2 August 2008 | "The Pearl of Posterity" |
The Elements find themselves shipwrecked on an island. They assist an unfit Phoenix and a not-so-scary Dragon looking for the Pearl of Prosperity, which they have lost while guarding. the island will experience drought and despair without the pearl.
| 8 | "Caring" | Paul Barber David Witt | 30 August 2008 | "The Potion" |
While the Elements hide in a dense forest, General Bu desperately searches for ideas on how to catch them. An apothecary white snake gives General Bu a poison that will harm the forest the elements are hiding in, due to this Shao Yen becomes deathly sick. The Elements have to find an antidote before it is too late.
| 9 | "Determination" | Brendan Luno | 6 September 2008 | "Qilin Time" |
| 10 | "Creativity" | Joshua Chiang Jeff Lawrence | 13 September 2008 | "Magic Paint Brushes" |
| 11 | "Moderation" | Joshua Chiang Jeff Lawrence | 20 September 2008 | "Masks of Fury" |
Jinhou and Raindrop are kidnapped by a terrifying witch queen, who uses a magic mask to coerce them into marrying her daughter, Keket. At the same time General Bu plans to steal the powerful mask by offering Grub as a suitor for Keket.
| 12 | "Forgiveness" | Paul Barber Brendan Luno | 22 September 2008 | "Mekla and Ramasura" |
| 13 | "Patience" | Joshua Chiang Jeff Lawrence | 23 September 2008 | "Monkey Bride" |
While the Elements are on the run from General Bu's army, they take refuge in a remote village that Bu's forces cannot enter. When the Elements fall asleep, they find out the village is the centre of a Dream Realm.
| 14 | "Acceptance" | John Mein | 24 September 2008 | "The Dream Eater" |
Jinhou is frozen when a lightning bolt hits him, when the god of thunder, Ramasura and his wife, the goddess of lightning, Mekla are bickering. The Elements must find a way to get the pair to reconcile to unfreeze Jinhou. however General Bu uses the bickering to his advantage to seize control of Mekla's lighting ball and starts freezing the Elements one by one.
| 15 | "Caution" | Stephen Batt | 25 September 2008 | "Magic Seeds" |
When a greedy Geni steals the Dragon's Eye, the Elements find themselves on a dangerous journey to get it back. On the way they enlist the help of a young man who has some magic seeds, who is on a quest to gain a magic mortar to marry his girlfriend.
| 16 | "Honesty" | Jamie R. Meldrum | 26 September 2008 | "Badang the Strong" |
| 17 | "Friendship" | Stephen Batt | 28 September 2008 | "Vampire Cat" |
Niwa is licked by a mysterious cat that the Elements encounter that takes her powers, which turns her into a zombie that General Bu easily captures. When the Elements go to rescue Niwa, the cat turns Jinhou into a zombie too and takes his elemental powers. Raindrop and Shao Yen manage to escape and bump into a Little Old Lady.
| 18 | "Sincerity" | Leonard Mah | 29 September 2008 | "Peach Boy and Oni" |
The Elements are left powerless because of General Bu. They meet a boy, Momotaro, and form an alliance together to get their powers back, with the use of a magic statue. However it turns out to be an Oni's hideout, and the boy uses this opportunity to steal their treasures.
| 19 | "Integrity" | Joshua Chiang Jeff Lawrence | 30 September 2008 | "Pointy Fish" |
When the Elements rush past a walled city they are caught by guards and taken to pay their respects to the city's vain king. General Bu's army can't get into the city, in retaliation Bu creates a flock of winged garfish to fly over the walls and terrorise the city.
| 20 | "Perseverance" | Jamie R. Meldrum | 1 October 2008 | "Tree of Power" |
| 21 | "Focus" | Kitty Phipps | 2 October 2008 | "Dragon Volcano" |
A Fire Dragon is summoned by General Bu to try and catch the Elements by creating a volcano in their paths. The Elements have no choice but to go underground.
| 22 | "Responsibility" | Brendan Luno Anthony Watt | 3 October 2008 | "L'il Dragons" |
When the Elements overhear General Bu's plans to get hold of a magic Daruma Doll, so he can wish to capture them. While taking refuge in a cave the elements realise that they have to get the doll before General Bu.During the chase for the doll they discover a baby dragon has hatched in the cave, with no signs of a mother.
| 23 | "Flexibility" | Gina Roncoli | 7 February 2009 | "Tea of Forgetfulness" |
| 24 | "Originality" | Joshua Chiang Jeff Lawrence | 21 February 2009 | "Evil Raindrop" |
| 25 | "Trust" | Brendan Luno Anthony Watt | 21 February 2009 | "Flamo Turns" |
General Bu finale discovers that the Elements are being guided on their journey with the Dragon's Eye. He gets Flamo to steal it but when General Bu gets his hands on the eye he doesn't know how to use it. He goes to Master Yun prison to ask him the secret.
| 26 | "Wisdom" | David Witt | 28 February 2009 | "Golden Dragon" |
The Elements are drawn by the Golden Dragons mysterious pull.The Elements and Master Yun find themselves at the academy where this journey all began. The Elements must go through the Golden Gate to raise the Golden Dragon.
