= Blinky Bill: The Mischievous Koala =

1992 Australian animated film

- Theatrical release poster
- Directed by: Yoram Gross
- Written by: Yoram Gross; Leonard Lee; John Palmer
- Based on: The Complete Adventures of Blinky Bill by Dorothy Wall
- Produced by: Yoram Gross
- Starring: Robyn Moore; Keith Scott; Ross Higgins
- Cinematography: Frank Hammond; Paul Ozerski; Nicholai Sherman
- Edited by: G.Y. Jerzy; Lee Smith
- Music by: Guy Gross
- Production company: Yoram Gross Films
- Distributed by: Greater Union Film Distributors
- Release date: 17 September 1992
- Running time: 97 minutes
- Country: Australia
- Language: English
- Box office: AUD$1.9 million

Blinky Bill: The Mischievous Koala (also known as Blinky Bill) is a 1992 Australian animated adventure comedy film directed by Yoram Gross and produced by his Sydney-based production company Yoram Gross Film Studios.

The film tells the story of Blinky Bill's childhood with his animal friends in the Australian bush. The peace and charm of their existence is shattered by the destruction of their homes by humans. Blinky rallies his friends as they battle to protect their homes from destruction and as he rescues his mother from captivity. The animation is superimposed over live-action footage of the Australian bush, which was filmed on location in a farm at Bobin.

== Plot ==
The local woodlanders are carrying on with their everyday life as normal until one morning when two men Harry and Joe start clearing the entire forest with their tractor. The animals evacuate as many trees fall down, and more trees are cut down including Mrs. Koala's home, and a tree knocks Blinky Bill unconscious.

At sunrise, nothing is left of the bush and every animal is left homeless. They move out of the grounds to search for a new home, including Mr. Wombat. Blinky, dazed and confused, calls for his mother, but she is nowhere in sight. Blinky rescues a young female koala named Nutsy from a cluster of fallen trees. They both run into Mr. Wombat. Nutsy tells him that Blinky has amnesia and Mr. Wombat explains to him about his life so far.

Blinky was a very mischievous sort causing trouble and receiving a scolding from Mayor Pelican, his teacher Miss Magpie and his mother for his many antics. He once encountered and escaped Ms. Pym at her general store. His mother then disciplines him by spanking him and cries about the grief he is causing her. By the end of this story, Blinky is feeling very guilty about the trouble he caused for his mother, so decides to find her.

Blinky and Nutsy make their way towards a riverbank where they meet up with a hard-of-hearing Granny Grunty Koala. Down the river, they meet up with Splodge and his family who tell them about what happened to Mrs. Koala who refused to evacuate out of pride in her own home. Blinky and Nutsy make their way to the waiting line where Mayor Pelican is assigning all the woodlanders to their places. Blinky approaches the mayor who is less than pleased, and orders Nurse Angelina to take the children to the leaking North Cave. Unfortunately, Blinky's mother is not there.

Blinky asks Ruff's mother for directions to the wood chip mill. Ignoring the fact there is danger there, Blinky goes to find his mother at the mill, and Nutsy follows him as they make their way through a rampaging river and the woods. They finally make it to the mill. The wood chip mill is home to the woodcutters that fell on their homes.

The next morning Blinky and Nutsy witness the woodcutters reducing the animals' former homes into sawdust, narrowly escaping the circular buzz-saw. Then they stay in hiding until night time, but as they try to escape, they alert the dogs. When Blinky slingshots the security light, Harry's wife Flo urges her husband to investigate. Blinky manages to slip out of the place, but Nutsy is trapped and makes a run for it, climbing into the bedroom of the family's daughter Claire.

Blinky tearfully goes back to tell the others about the tragic news. Blinky's gang form a rescue party, forcing Marcia, a marsupial mouse, to join them. Blinky has Jacko, a kookaburra, para-drop Marcia down the chimney of the woodcutters' house taking notes of the house layout and items. Meanwhile, Nutsy climbs into Claire's bed who wakes up happy to find a real koala in her bed and manages to get her parents to let her keep the koala temporarily.

Blinky's gang sneak up to the house at night, then break into the house, but then they start up a commotion. Claire immediately hides herself and Nutsy in her bedroom cupboard. Splodge manages to fend off both the dogs and Joe, while Blinky keeps Harry and Flo locked in their bedroom. In the chaos that follows, the wood chip machines startup. Blinky gets Nutsy out of the house and they both fight off Harry. The chain of chaotic events against Harry and Joe ends them up in a water tank. Blinky locates his mother, and they all leave the place in the woodcutters' truck, while Claire waves tearfully goodbye to her new-found koala friends.

== Characters ==
=== Animal characters ===
- Blinky Bill - a young koala and the titular film character.
- Nutsy - a female koala and Blinky's best friend.
- Splodge - a kangaroo who lives with his parents.
- Marcia - a tomboyish marsupial mouse and one of Blinky's friends.
- Flap - a platypus and one of Blinky's friends.
- Mrs. Koala - Blinky's mother. She was kidnapped by Harry and his assistant Joe.
- Mr. Wombat - Blinky's mentor. He does not like it when Blinky calls him "Wombo".
- Miss Magpie - Blinky's school teacher.
- Mayor Pelican - the Mayor of Greenpatch. He hates it when Blinky gets up to mischief.
- Mr. Gloop - Mayor Pelican's helper.
- Jacko - a kookaburra who often laughs.
- Ruff - a frilled-neck lizard and one of Blinky's friends. He wears a yellow shirt.
- Nurse Angelina - a wallaby, who wears a nurse uniform.

=== Humans ===
- Harry - a fat woodcutter, Joe's boss, Flo's husband, and Claire's father.
- Joe - Harry's assistant.
- Flo - Harry's wife and Claire's mother.
- Claire - Harry and Flo's six-year-old daughter.
- Ms. Glennys Pym - a shopkeeper who has a dislike for koalas.

== Cast ==
- Robyn Moore as Blinky, Nutsy, Marcia, Mrs. Koala, Miss Magpie, Nurse Angelina, Flo, Claire, and Ms. Pym
- Keith Scott as Flap, Splodge, Mr. Wombat, Mayor Pelican, Mr. Gloop, Jacko, Harry, and Joe
- Ross Higgins as the Frogs

== Soundtrack ==
Guy Gross composed and produced music and songs, while all lyrics of the latter are written by John Palmer except "You and Me" and "Nutsy's Ballad", where instead are by Mattie Porges. Finally, through The Danglin' Bros. performance, all songs are sung by Robyn Moore and Keith Scott except where indicated below.

Songs From the Movie "Blinky Bill: The Mischievous Koala"

Soundtrack album by John Palmer, Robyn Moore and Keith Scott
- Released: 17 September 1992
- Recorded: 1992 (7 songs only)
- Genre: Children's music
- Length: 48:19
- Labels: Yoram Gross Films / ABC Music, Roadshow
- Producer: Guy Gross

Track listing
| No. | Title | Artist | Length |
|---|---|---|---|
| 1. | "You and Me" | Robyne Dunn, Geoff Robertson, Kevin Bennett | 4:39 |
| 2. | "I’m Old Man Wombat" | Keith Scott | 2:10 |
| 3. | "I'm Blinky Bill" | Robyn Moore, Keith Scott | 3:18 |
| 4. | "Arithmetic Song" | Robyn Moore, Keith Scott | 1:41 |
| 5. | "Gribbit (Frog Song)" | Ross Higgins | 1:46 |
| 6. | "I am the Mayor" | Keith Scott | 1:30 |
| 7. | "Nutsy's Ballad" | Robyn Moore | 3:54 |
| 8. | "Motherhood" | Robyn Moore, Keith Scott | 1:25 |
| 9. | "How I Hate Koalas" | Robyn Moore | 1:02 |
| 10. | "Snakes Are So Superior" | Robyn Moore | 2:18 |
| 11. | "Country Girls" | Robyn Moore, Keith Scott | 2:11 |
| 12. | "Don’t Try to Sing Underwater" | Robyn Moore, Keith Scott | 2:06 |
| 13. | "Home" | Robyn Moore | 1:42 |
| 14. | "Who’s on the Menu Tonight" | Robyn Moore, Keith Scott | 2:00 |
| 15. | "Whistle Song" | Robyn Moore | 2:16 |
| 16. | "Sleep Bush Baby Sleep" | Julie Anthony | 1:50 |

== Box office ==
Blinky Bill: The Mischievous Koala grossed $1,903,659 at the box office in Australia.

== Home media ==
Blinky Bill: The Mischievous Koala was released on VHS by Roadshow Entertainment and on DVD by Umbrella Entertainment.

== Television series ==
The film was followed by television series, The Adventures of Blinky Bill that aired on Australian Broadcasting Corporation, Seven Network, and ABC For Kids for three seasons.
