= Flying Bark Productions =

Australian animation studio & entertainment subsidiary of Studio 100

Flying Bark Productions Pty. Ltd.
- Logo used since 2021
- Trade name: Flying Bark Productions
- Formerly: Yoram Gross Film Studios Pty. Ltd. (1967–1996); Yoram Gross-Village Roadshow Pty. Ltd. (1996–1999); Yoram Gross-EM.TV Pty. Ltd. (1999–2006)
- Industry: 2D animation; Computer animation; Motion picture; TV series
- Founded: 1967; 59 years ago
- Founder: Yoram Gross; Sandra Gross
- Headquarters: Sydney, Australia
- Number of locations: 3 studios (2026)
- Key people: Barbara Stephen (CEO); Alexia Gates-Foale (EVP/Executive Director of Content)
- Parent: Village Roadshow (1996–1999); EM.TV & Merchandising AG (1999–2008); Studio 100 (2008–present)
- Divisions: Flying Bark Productions Sydney; Flying Bark Productions Los Angeles; Flying Bark Productions Madrid
- Subsidiaries: After Bark
- Website: www.flyingbark.com.au

Flying Bark Productions Pty. Ltd. (formerly known as Yoram Gross Film Studios, Yoram Gross-Village Roadshow and Yoram Gross-EM.TV) is an Australian animation studio and entertainment company that is a subsidiary of Belgian production company Studio 100. The studio acts as a full-service production facility across feature films, television, and an assorted range of digital content. The studio was established by Yoram and Sandra Gross in 1967 as Yoram Gross Film Studios, and its stake was acquired by Australian media group Village Roadshow in 1996 before their stake was sold to German media & entertainment company EM.TV & Merchandising.

== History ==
In January 1996, Yoram Gross Film Studios announced they had established a partnership with Australian media group Village Roadshow, with the interest of Yoram Gross Film Studios being sold to them under their motion picture production division Village Roadshow Pictures. The company was later renamed to Yoram Gross-Village Roadshow, with Greg Coote, producer and founder of Village Roadshow's American division Village Roadshow Pictures, and Graham Burke, Village Roadshow's president & CEO, joining the renamed Australian animation studio's board. The studio agreed to produce ten animated series with Village Roadshow's television division. One year later, in October 1997, Yoram Gross-Village Roadshow made a co-production pact with Europe-based German production and distribution company EM.TV & Merchandising AG, with whom they jointly handled television productions. Following this successful partnership, and with Village Roadshow seeking an exit from television production, EM.TV & Merchandising bought out Village Roadshow's interest in Yoram Gross-Village Roadshow in 1999, renaming the company to Yoram Gross-EM.TV. EM.TV was also now distributing the animation studio's programmes worldwide. By December 1999, Yoram Gross-EM.TV launched their own in-house licensing division named YG-EM Licensing to handle their own productions including EM.TV's co-production alongside their Junior programming catalogue.

In March 2004, Yoram Gross-EM.TV expanded into the American production services by joining forces with American production outfit Coote/Hayes Productions (aka Village Roadshow Pictures Television), in order to establish a Los-Angleses based American production subsidiary that handles the Australian animation studio's programming in the United States and Latin America, entitled Yoram Gross USA. This new American production subsidiary signed a home video deal with Miramax to distribute Yoram Gross-EM.TV's series Flipper & Lopaka on DVD for a July release, while Edward Olson had been named president of Yoram Gross USA to oversee distribution of the studios library in those countries.

On November 15, 2004, Yoram Gross-EM.TV had appointed Guy Gross, son of Yoram Gross-EM.TV founder Yoram Gross & film composer, previously directed the company's Australian/French series Old Tom and composed all of Yoram Gross-EM.TV's animated series, as producer and director for all of the production projects of the Australian entertainment studio.

In January 2006, seven years after their acquisition of 50% of Yoram Gross EM.TV, EM.TV & Merchandising announced their full acquisition of the remaining 50% stake of Yoram Gross EM.TV from its founders Yoram and Sandra Gross under their entertainment division EM. Entertainment, giving EM.Entertainment full control of the Australian animation and production group. By October 2006 following EM.Entertainment's acquisition of the remaining 50% stake in Yoram Gross-EM.TV ten months prior, Yoram Gross EM.TV announced a restructuring and rebranding of the company as Flying Bark Productions, alongside its distribution division Yoram Gross Distribution, which was renamed to Flying Bark Distribution as the rebranded company would start planning to expand its portfolio into the adult-animated and children's genre.

In February 2007, a year after the rebranding of Yoram Gross-EM.TV to Flying Bark Productions, the company announced that its managing director Geoff Watson had depatured the Australia animation production company after 10 years with Canadian producer Michael Hefferon had assumed the role of MD while Geoff Watson would continue to lead Flying Bark Productions' New Zealand film & TV audio production subsidiary Trackdown Digital via MD.

In May 2007, Flying Bark Productions' parent EM.TV announced its planning to exit the children's entertainment business through the sale of its Australian animation studio Flying Bark Productions including Yoram Gross' programming catalogue such as Blinky Bill, and its parent EM.Entertainment GmbH. One year later, in May 2008, Indian media conglomerate Zee Telefilms entered a bid to acquire Flying Bark Productions and EM.Entertainment GmbH, the German kids & family entertainment division of EM.Sport Media for $100 million. But on the 30th of that month, Belgian children's production company Studio 100 had acquired Australian animation studio Flying Bark Productions, including the Yoram Gross programming library such as Blinky Bill, and its parent EM.Entertainment GmBH, the children's entertainment division of EM.Sport Media AG announced that they have exited the children's entertainment & animation business with them had sold Flying Bark Productions alongside EM's entertainment division for €41 million in order for EM.Sport Media to focus on their expanded sport activities as EM.Sport Media exited the animation & youth entertainment business, with Flying Bark Productions became Studio 100's in-house Australian animation subsidiary marking Studio 100's first animation studio outside of Belgium while the latter's German distribution Studio 100 Media assuming Flying Bark's catalogue & would distribute the studio's future programming state.

In February 2014, Flying Bark Productions announced that former head of ABC children's content & Sticky Pictures' co-founder Tim Brooke-Hunt (who was Flying Bark's former executive producer & director of the company via its former name Yoram Gross Studios) had returned to the Australian entertainment company as the president and will lead Flying Bark's future development state, meanwhile he also joined Flying Bark's parent Studio 100 as advisor of its board.

In December 2019, Flying Bark Productions announced their plans to open a Los Angeles branch in early 2020, appointing American storyboarder/director Ian Graham as Chief Creative Director of the LA studio.

In late-March 2022, Flying Bark Productions increased its adult-animated state with the establishment of its new production arm After Bark, dedicated to adult animated programmes along with scripted and unscripted projects for mature audiences, with Amy Noble and Kate Andrew becoming CCO and head of legal & business affairs of the new production subsidiary. A year later on May 2, 2023, after Flying Bark Productions had established its adult animated-based production arm After Bark, Flying Bark Productions had hired former Nickelodeon Australia director of television Hugh Baldwin to head its production arm After Bark as executive producer of development.

In June 2024, Flying Bark Productions expanded its production operations into Europe with the opening of a Madrid-based animation studio, marking Flying Bark Productions' first entry into the European and Spanish animation production markets; and partnered with Spanish animation studio supervisor Ramon Giráldez to head the new Spanish animation studio.

== Filmography ==
=== Flying Bark Productions feature films ===
Title	Release date	Distributor	Notes
Gumnutz: A Juicy Tale	24 December 2007	FFC Australia	co-production with Bix Pix Productions and ABC Studios
Santa's Apprentice	24 November 2010	Gaumont	co-production with Gaumont Alphanim, Cartoon Saloon and Avril Stark Entertainment
The Woodlies Movie	23 February 2013	Seven Network; Universum Film (Germany)	co-production with Studio 100 Media, Seven Network, ZDF and Telegael
Maya the Bee	2014	StudioCanal; Universum Film (Germany)	also known as Maya the Bee Movie co-production with Studio 100 Film, Screen Australia, ZDF and Buzz Studios
Blinky Bill the Movie	17 September 2015	StudioCanal	co-production with Telegael, Screen Australia, Screen NSW and Assemblage Entertainment
Maya the Bee: The Honey Games	1 April 2018 (Germany); 26 July 2018 (Australia)	StudioCanal; Universum Film (Germany)	Sequel to Maya the Bee Movie co-production with Studio 100 Film, Screen Australia, Buzz Studios and Fish Blowing Bubbles
100% Wolf	29 May 2020	Studio 100 Film	co-production with Studio 100 Film, Screen Australia, Screenwest, Lotterywest, Create NSW, Siamese and De-Fi Media
Maya the Bee: The Golden Orb	7 January 2021	StudioCanal	co-production with Studio 100 Film, Studio 100 Media, Studio Isar Animation and Studio B Animation
Rise of the Teenage Mutant Ninja Turtles: The Movie	5 August 2022	Netflix	Animations services only produced by Nickelodeon Movies
Mia and Me: The Hero of Centopia	26 May 2022 (Germany); 27 October 2022 (Australia)	Icon Film Distribution; Constantin Film (Germany)	co-production with Studio 100 Film, Studio 100 Media, Studio Isar Animation, Constantin Film and Studio B Animation
200% Wolf	8 August 2024	StudioCanal; Atlantika Films (Spain)	Sequel to 100% Wolf co-production with Studio 100 Film, Screen Australia, Screenwest, Lotterywest, Siamese and Atlantika Films
Avatar Aang: The Last Airbender	25 July 2026	Paramount+	Animation services only produced by Paramount Pictures, Nickelodeon Movies and Avatar Studios
Zac Power	7 January 2027 (Australia/New Zealand)	Paramount Pictures (Australia/New Zealand); Studio 100 Film (International)	co-production with Cheeky Little Media, Pixel Zoo Animation Studios, and Australian Children's Television Foundation

=== TV series ===
Title	Years	Network	Notes
The Adventures of Blinky Bill	1993–2004	ABC/Seven Network	co-production with EM.TV & Merchandising, EM.TV Wavery and WDR
Tabaluga	1997–2004	Seven Network; ZDF (Germany)	co-production with EM.Entertainment, ZDF Enterprises and Victory Media Group
Skippy: Adventures in Bushtown	1998–99	Nine Network	co-production with Tele Images Productions
Dumb Bunnies	1998–99	Seven Network; CBS (United States)	co-production with Nelvana and Scholastic
Flipper & Lopaka	1999–2005	Seven Network; ZDF (Germany, season 3)	co-production with EM.Entertainment and Animation Filmmakers Corporation
Fairy Tale Police Department	2001–02	Seven Network (Australia)	co-production with EM.Entertainment, Talit Communications and Victory Media Group
Old Tom	2002	ABC1; TF1 (France)	co-production with EM.TV Wavery and Millimages
Bambaloo	2003–04	Seven Network	co-production with The Jim Henson Company (season 1)
Deadly	2006	Nine Network	Last production under the Yoram Gross-EM.TV name co-production with SLR Productions
Dive Olly Dive!	2006–10	Seven Network; Animania (United States); KIKA (Germany)	credited as Yoram Gross-EM.TV for the first 16 episodes; first production under the Flying Bark Productions name co-production with Mike Young Productions, Taffy Entertainment (season 1), MoonScoop (season 2), GDC International, Atlantyca Entertainment (season 2) and Telegael; Owned by Splash Entertainment
Staines Down Drains	2006–07	Seven Network	co-production with EM.Entertainment, Flux Animation Studio, Traction and NZ On Air
Zeke's Pad	2008–10	Seven Network; YTV (Canada)	uncredited co-production with Leaping Lizard Productions, Bardel Entertainment and Avrill Stark Entertainment
Master Raindrop	2008–09	Seven Network	co-production with EM.Entertainment, Big Communications, Flux Animation Studio and Media Development Authority
Legend of Enyo	2009–10	Seven Network	co-production with Avrill Stark Entertainment and Screen NSW
Zigby	2009–11	ABC Kids; Treehouse TV (Canada); ZDF (Germany)	co-production with Avrill Stark Entertainment, Thunderbird Films and Big Animation
The Woodlies	2012	Seven Network; ZDF (Germany)	co-production with Studio 100 Media
Vic the Viking	2013–14	Network Ten/Eleven (Australia); ABC3 (Australia); TF1 (France)	co-production with Studio 100 Animation and ASE Studios
Tashi	2014–15	7TWO	co-production with Telegael and Discreet Art Productions
Heidi	2015–19	Nine Network; TF1 (France); Tiji/Piwi+ (France); ZDF (Germany)	season 1 only co-production with Studio 100 Animation and Heidi Productions (season 1); Based on the novel Heidi by Johanna Spyri
The Wild Adventures of Blinky Bill	2016–17	7TWO/ABC Me	co-production with Studio 100, Studio 100 Media, Telegael and Giant Wheel Animation
Oh, Yuck!	2017	Seven Network	co-production with Silhouette Media Group
Rise of the Teenage Mutant Ninja Turtles	2018–20	Nickelodeon	Animation services only produced by Nickelodeon Animation Studio
Glitch Techs	2020	Netflix	Animation services only produced by Nickelodeon Animation Studio
Lego Monkie Kid	2020–23	Peacock	co-production with The Lego Group continued by WildBrain Studios from season 5 onwards
100% Wolf: Legend of the Moonstone	2020–23	ABC Me	co-production with Studio 100 Media and Studio 56
FriendZSpace	2021–22	ABC Me	co-production with Studio 100 Media, Dan Clark Company, Shellnut Entertainment and T&B Media Global
What If...?	2021–24	Disney+	Animation services only produced by Marvel Studios Animation
Moon Girl and Devil Dinosaur	2023–25	Disney Channel and Disney+	Animation services only produced by Disney Television Animation, Marvel Animation and Cinema Gypsy Productions
Tales from Outer Suburbia	2026	ABC iview (Australia) and BYUtv (United States)	co-production with Siamese and Highly Spirited
Stranger Things: Tales from '85	2026	Netflix	Animation services only produced by 21 Laps Entertainment, Upside Down Pictures and Netflix
Ghostbusters: Night Shift	2027	Netflix	Animation services only produced by Netflix Animation Studios, Sony Pictures Animation and Ghost Corps
Untitled Minecraft series	Coming TBA	Netflix	Animation services only produced by Netflix
Untitled Clash of Clans series	Coming TBA	Netflix	Coming TBA
Doomsweepers	Coming TBA	Web series	Animation services only produced by lightfold

=== Web series ===
- The Eggsperts (2014)

=== Yoram Gross feature films ===
- Dot and the Kangaroo (1977)
- The Little Convict (1979; also known as Toby and the Koala)
- Around the World with Dot (1981; also known as Dot and Santa Claus)
- Sarah (1982; also known as The Seventh Match and Sarah and the Squirrel)
- Dot and the Bunny (1983)
- The Camel Boy (1984)
- Epic (1984; also known as Epic: Days of the Dinosaur)
- Dot and the Koala (1985)
- Dot and Keeto (1986)
- Dot and the Whale (1986)
- Dot and the Smugglers (1987; also known as Dot and the Bunyip)
- Dot Goes to Hollywood (1987)
- The Magic Riddle (1991)
- Blinky Bill: The Mischievous Koala (1992; also known as Blinky Bill)
- Dot in Space (1994)
- Skippy Saves Bushtown (1999)
- Tabaluga and Leo (2005; with ZDF Enterprises)
- Blinky Bill's White Christmas (2005)
- Flipper and Lopaka: The Feature (2006)

=== Yoram Gross TV series ===
- Bright Sparks (1989; with Beyond International Group)
- Samuel and Nina (1996–1997; with Children's Television Workshop and Cartoon Network Productions)
- Art Alive (2003–2005)
- Seaside Hotel (2003–2005; with Télé Images Kids)

=== TV special ===
- The Adventures of Candy Claus (1987)

=== Interactive board game ===
- Atmosfear (2004)

== See also ==
- List of film production companies
- List of television production companies
