= Rhett Walton =

Australian actor

Rhett Walton is an Australian actor who has appeared in various theatre, film and television productions, including the soap operas Families and Home & Away. He is a National Institute of Dramatic Arts (NIDA) graduate, from the class of 1985, where he studied alongside his future wife, Sonia Todd.

On stage he played Macbeth in Macbeth at the Playhouse in Newcastle in 1993, Bassanio for Bell Shakespeare's 1999 run of The Merchant of Venice, Paul in a 1993 run of Brilliant Lies beginning from the plays debut, C.K. Dexter Haven in The Philadelphia Story at the Sydney Opera House in 1986, Benedick in Much Ado About Nothing at the Reg Bartley Grandstand in 1986, and appeared in Murder by Misadventure at Marian Street Theatre in 1992. He played alongside his wife in Worst Kept Secrets in 2014.

He has also written scripts for the children's television series Outriders, Fairy Tale Police Department, Tabaluga, Flipper & Lopaka, Blinky Bill, Pig's Breakfast and the drama series Big Sky.
