= The Adventures of Blinky Bill =

Australian animated television series

- Title card
- Genre: Animation; Adventure; Children's television series
- Based on: The Complete Adventures of Blinky Bill by Dorothy Wall
- Written by: Sally Farrell Odgers; Susan Beak; Geoff Beak; John Palmer; Yoram Gross; Carol Witt; David Witt; Hugh Stucky; Ray Nowland; Phil Sanders; Rhett Walton; Gina Roncoli; Maryam Master; Fiona Kelly; Stephen Davis; Fiona Bozic; Chris Phillips; Lisa Hoppe; Melanie Alexander; Andy Ryan
- Directed by: Yoram Gross (Season 1–2); David Evans (Season 3); Guy Gross (TV movie)
- Voices of: Robyn Moore; Keith Scott; Sarah Aubrey (Season 3 and TV movie); Troy Planet (Season 3); Nick Jasprizza (Season 3); Drew Forsythe (Season 3); Rachel King (Season 3); Shane Withington (TV movie)
- Theme music composer: Guy Gross
- Opening theme: "Hey, Hey, Blinky Bill" performed by Keith Scott (Season 1); “Hey, Hey, Blinky Bill” performed by Ric Herbert (Season 2-3)
- Ending theme: I’m Blinky Bill (Season 1); Yahoo Didgeridoo (Season 2); Instrumental version of “Hey, Hey, Blinky Bill” (Season 3)
- Composers: Guy Gross; Clive Harrison (additional music, Season 3 only)
- Country of origin: Australia
- Original language: English
- No. of seasons: 3
- No. of episodes: 78 (list of episodes)

Production
- Executive producers: Sandra Gross (Season 1–3 and TV movie); Tim Brooke-Hunt (Season 1–2); Siegmund Grewenig (Season 3); Yoram Gross (Season 3 and TV movie); Geoff Watson (Season 3 and TV movie)
- Producers: Yoram Gross (Season 1–2); Manuela Lumb (Season 3); Rodney Whitham (Season 3); Andre Kussmaul (Season 3); Martina Mosner (Season 3); Guy Gross (TV movie)
- Running time: 26 minutes (Season 1–2); 24 minutes (Season 3)
- Production companies: Yoram Gross Film Studios (Season 1–2); Yoram Gross-EM.TV (Season 3 and TV movie); EM.TV and WDR

Original release
- Network: Australian Broadcasting Corporation (1993–1995); Seven Network (2004–2005); ABC Kids (1993–2013)
- Release: 4 January 1993 – 5 July 2004

The Adventures of Blinky Bill is an Australian animated television series based on Dorothy Wall's books about Blinky Bill, and is a sequel series to the 1992 film Blinky Bill: The Mischievous Koala. The series is produced by the Yoram Gross companies: Yoram Gross Film Studios (from 1993 to 1995) and Yoram Gross-EM.TV (from 2004 to 2005), with the main co-production of EM.TV and WDR. All three seasons of the series and the TV film were animated overseas by Colorland Animation Productions Co., Ltd. in Hong Kong. Set in Greenpatch, a fictional Australian bushland town, the series presents stories through the activities and misadventures of Blinky Bill, as well as his family and friends.

== Series ==
=== Season 1 (The Adventures of Blinky Bill, 1993) ===
In the first season of The Adventures of Blinky Bill (1993, 26 episodes), Blinky Bill and his friends rebuild the buildings and the community in Greenpatch, following its destruction by humans. They also come to terms with their new neighbours, the ill-famed Dingo family.

The season first aired on ABC Television in 1993. Yoram Gross (with his first studios Yoram Gross Film Studios) co-produced the first series with: EM.Entertainment (Germany), WDR/ARD (Germany), ABC (Australia), and BBC (UK).

=== Season 2 (Blinky Bill's Extraordinary Excursion, 1995) ===
In the second season of Blinky Bill's Extraordinary Excursion (1995, 26 episodes), Blinky Bill and his friends become lost while on a school excursion in the bush. Finding their way home across different parts of Australia, they have many adventures helping out other animals in need, including a crocodile, penguins, and farm and circus animals.

The second season was a Yoram Gross Film Studios co-production with EM.Entertainment, WDR/ARD and VIDEAL of Germany, as well as the Australian Broadcasting Corporation. It was aired on ABC Television in Australia.

=== Season 3 (Blinky Bill, 2004) ===
In season 3 (alternatively known as Blinky Bill's Extraordinary Balloon Adventure and Blinky Bill's Around the World Adventures in marketing), Blinky Bill, Nutsy, and Flap travel around the world in a hot air balloon that takes them on exciting adventures being chased by two humans named Basil and Cyril who are the Circus Bros. The animals he rescued were: Slippery, Leo, Ling-Ling, Tico, Yoyo, and Penelope (who originally works for the Circus Bros.). They went to Antarctica, the African plains, China, the Amazon rainforest, India and Paris.

The season aired on 10 June 2004 on the Seven Network. The third series was a Yoram Gross-EM.TV co-production with EM.TV (Germany), WDR (Germany), ABC (Australia), and Wavery (Netherlands).

=== Spin-offs ===
Two spin-off pilot episodes, Flap's Family and Flap's Island, both following the story of supporting character Flap, were developed by Yoram Gross with the assistance of the Australian Film Commission and the New South Wales Film and Television Office in 1996, but both were not picked up.

=== TV movie (Blinky Bill's White Christmas, 2005) ===
In 2005, a television movie entitled Blinky Bill's White Christmas was produced by Yoram Gross-EM.TV, in co-production with WDR (Germany). The telemovie first aired on the Seven Network on 24 December 2005. Its theme song, "Christmas in Australia", was performed by Christine Anu.

In the Philippines, the special was aired across two parts on GMA Network on 1 and 2 December 2020.

== Soundtracks ==
- Blinky Bill and Friends Singing Songs Based On the TV Series (1994)
- Blinky Bill and his "Extraordinary" Christmas Sing-Along! (1999)
- Don and Blinky's Outback Adventure - The Lost Cooee (2002)

== Video games ==
- Blinky Bill's Ghost Cave (1996)
- Blinky Bill's Extraordinary Balloon Adventure (1997)
- Blinky Bill and the Magician (1998)
- Blinky Bill's Play & Learn (1999)
- Blinky Bill's Cartoon Maker (2001)

== Home media releases ==
=== VHS releases ===
==== Australia ====
- Blinky Bill's Favourite Café (1994)
- Blinky Rescues the Budgie (1994)
- Blinky and the Red Car (1995)
- Detective Blinky (1995)
- Blinky Bill Down On the Farm (1996)
- Blinky Bill and the Lost Puppy (1996)
- Sing A Song with Blinky Bill (1997)
- Blinky Bill and the Polar Bears (1998)
- Blinky Remembers Nutsy's Birthday (1998)
- Blinky Bill's Holiday (1998)
- Blinky Bill and the Blue Mystery (1999)
- Blinky Bill Goes Camping (2000)
- Blinky Bill and the Magician (2002)
- Blinky Bill and the Winter's Tale (2002)
- Mayor Blinky Bill (2003)

==== North America ====
- The_{⠀}Adventures of Blinky_{⠀}Bill: Blinky Bill's Fire Brigade (1995 Kidmark)
- The_{⠀}Adventures of Blinky_{⠀}Bill: Blinky Bills Zoo (1995 Kidmark)

=== DVD releases ===
- Blinky Bill to the Rescue (2015)
- Blinky Bill's Red Car (2015)
- Blinky Saves Granny's Glasses (2015)
- Detective Blinky (2016)
- Blinky Bill and the Strange Koala (2017)
- Blinky Bill's Treasure Hunt (2017)

=== Miscellaneous releases ===
- ABC For Kids Featuring Banana Holiday and Lots of Other Great Songs (1994)
- ABC For Kids Bumper Collection (1999)

== Forest industry controversy ==
The theme of the first series carried a strong anti-woodchip message, with the second line saying "Save us from that woodchip mill", together with scenes of forest destruction. There were also obvious environmental messages in most episodes. Some forest industry groups lobbied the ABC arguing that the opening scene showed illegal wood chipping, which was not fair to the timber industry. In the following two series, these song lyrics and the opening credits sequence were different (the line in the theme became "You'll never catch him standing still"), reflecting the change in storylines and locations.

== Reception ==
The Adventures of Blinky Bill received generally positive reviews.
