= Guy Gross =

Australian film and television composer

- Born: Guy Gross
- Occupations: Film and TV composer
- Years active: 1977–present
- Parent(s): Yoram Gross; Sandra Gross

Guy Gross is an Australian film and television composer. He is known most for writing the award-winning music for the Australian science fiction series Farscape and the international hit film The Adventures of Priscilla, Queen of the Desert. He also composed for the animated television series Blinky Bill and Dumb Bunnies. He has 91 credits as screen composer.

== Personal ==
Gross began film scoring while studying classical composition at the Conservatorium High School in Sydney, Australia. He is the son of film producers Yoram and Sandra Gross. Gross composed music for the family animation business in High School.

Gross was a partner and a director of Trackdown Digital, an Australian film music and audio recording centre. From 2012 to 2017, he was President of the Australian Guild of Screen Composers. In 2015, he founded Church Street Studios.

== Filmography ==
- Composer (90 credits)
- Producer (1 credit)
- Music Department (14 credits)
- Director (3 credits)
- Soundtrack (10 credits)
- Writer (2 credits)
- Actor (1 credit)
- Camera and Electrical Department (1 credit)
- Sound Department (1 credit)

=== Films ===
- 2022
  - How to Please a Woman (composer)
- 2021
  - Jez: A Letter for Life (composer)
  - Birdsville or Bust (composer)
- 2020
  - Picturing Home (composer)
  - Le Miroir (composer)
- 2019
  - Broken Dreams (composer)
- 2018
  - Treetment (composer)
  - Swinging Safari (composer)
- 2017
  - BABA (Short) (composer)
- 2016
  - I Wandering Soul (Short)
  - Library of Love (Short)
- 2015
  - Bluey (Short)
  - The Longest War: The Australian Army in Afghanistan (Documentary)
- 2014
  - Flat Daddy (Short)
  - Tango Underpants (Short)
- 2013
  - The Landing (Short)
  - Larrikin Lad (Documentary) (original music by)
  - The Turning (segment "Sand")
- 2012
  - Perception (Short)
  - Dream Island (Short)
  - The First Fagin (Documentary)
- 2011
  - Blinky & Me (Documentary)
  - Dancing with Dictators: The Story of the Last Foreign Publisher in Burma (Documentary)
  - A Few Best Men, A Few Best Men (soundtrack)
  - A Heartbeat Away
  - The Making of I, Spry (Video documentary short)
- 2009
  - Lost in Flanders (Video documentary)
  - True Crime: A Model Daughter (TV Movie)
  - Fat Chance (Documentary)
  - Fairweather Man (Documentary)
- 2008
  - Hey, Hey, It's Esther Blueburger
- 2006
  - Final Call (Short)
- 2005
  - Amorality Tale (Short)
- 2003
  - Silent Storm (Documentary)
- 2000
  - Uncle Chatzkel (Documentary)
  - Cut
- 1998
  - That's the Way I Like It
  - Forever Fever
- 1997
  - Welcome to Woop Woop
- 1994
  - The Adventures of Priscilla, Queen of the Desert
- 1993
  - Frauds
- 1992
  - Blinky Bill: The Mischievous Koala
- 1991
  - The Magic Riddle
  - When Ships Draw Near (Short)
- 1987
  - Dot and the Smugglers
  - Dot Goes to Hollywood
- 1986
  - Dot and the Whale
- 1985
  - Epic

=== Television ===
- 2021
  - Untold Australia (composer 1 episode)
- 2017
  - Pulse (TV Series) (8 episodes)
  - Oh Yuck! (TV Series) (26 episodes)
- 2014
  - Shark Girl (TV Movie documentary)
  - Taking on the Chocolate Frog (TV Mini-Series documentary)
  - Sam Fox: Extreme Adventures (TV Series) (8 episodes)
- 2012
  - Raising the Curtain (TV Series documentary)
  - Dangerous Remedy (TV Movie)
- 2010
  - I, Spry (TV Movie)
- 2009
  - Lost in Flanders (Video documentary)
  - True Crime: A Model Daughter (TV Movie)
- 2008–2009
  - Dex Hamilton: Alien Entomologist (TV Series) (26 episodes)
- 2008
  - The Prime Minister Is Missing (TV Movie)
  - Scorched (TV Movie)
  - Resistance (TV Series) (1 episode)
- 2007–2011
  - East West 101 (TV Series) (20 episodes)
- 2007
  - Murder in the Outback (TV Movie)
- 2006
  - Who Killed Dr Bogle and Mrs Chandler? (TV Movie documentary)
- 2005
  - Tabaluga and Leo
  - Blinky Bill's White Christmas
  - Flipper & Lopaka: The Search for Neptune's Trident (TV Series) (1 episode)
  - The Birth of a Queen: Directing a Drag Classic – The Adventures of Priscilla, Queen of the Desert (Video documentary short)
- 2004
  - Farscape: The Peacekeeper Wars (TV Mini-Series) (2 episodes)
  - Blinky Bill's Extraordinary Balloon Adventure (TV Series)
- 2002
  - Seconds to Spare (TV Movie)
- 2001
  - Old Tom (TV Series)
- 2000–2003
  - Farscape (TV Series) (58 episodes)
- 1999
  - Flipper & Lopaka (TV Series) (2 episodes)
- 1998–1999
  - Dumb Bunnies (TV Series)
- 1997
  - Fallen Angels (TV Series) (20 episodes)
- 1997–1998
  - Skippy: Adventures in Bushtown (TV Series) (2 episodes)
- 1996
  - Big Bag (TV Series) (segment "Samuel & Nina", 1996)
  - McLeod's Daughters (TV Movie)
- 1995
  - Bordertown (TV Mini-Series)
  - Blinky Bill's Extraordinary Excursion (TV Series) (1 episode)
- 1993
  - The Adventures of Blinky Bill (TV Series)
- 1994
  - House of Fun (TV Series)
- 1992
  - The Resting Place (TV Short)
- 1987
  - The Adventures of Candy Claus (TV Short)

== Awards ==
=== ARIA Music Awards ===
The ARIA Music Awards is an annual awards ceremony that recognises excellence, innovation, and achievement across all genres of Australian music. They commenced in 1987.

Year	Nominee / work	Award	Result	Ref.
1995	The Priscilla Companion Original Score	Best Original Soundtrack, Cast or Show Album	Nominated	

- In 1994 he was nominated for an Australian Film Institute Award in the Best Original Music Score category for his score for The Adventures of Priscilla, Queen of the Desert.
- In 1995, he was nominated for the British Academy of Film and Television Arts' Anthony Asquith Award for Original Film Music for The Adventures of Priscilla, Queen of the Desert.
- In 2001 he won the Australian Screen Music Award for achievement in Film music for his score for Farscape.
- In 2002 he won the Screen Music Award for Best Music for a Television Series for his score for Farscape.
- In 2009 he won the International Achievement Award (a Screen Music Award) from the Australasian Performing Right Association and the Australian Guild of Screen Composers. In the same year he won another Screen Music Award in the category Best Music for Children's Television for his score for Dex Hamilton: Alien Entomologist
