= McCosh =

McCosh is a surname. Notable people with the surname include:

- A. J. McCosh (1858–1908), American football player and surgeon
- Andrew K. McCosh (1880–1967), Scottish industrialist
- Anne Kutka McCosh (1902–1994), American artist
- David McCosh (1903–1981), American artist
- Eric McCosh (born 1938), Hong Kong field hockey player
- James McCosh (1811–1894), Scottish philosopher
- John McCosh (1805–1885), Scottish army surgeon and photographer
- James Eichelburger McCosh (fl. 1870s), builder & operator of McCosh Grist Mill, Randolph County, Alabama
- Shawn McCosh (born 1969), Canadian ice hockey player
- Shayne McCosh (born 1974), Canadian ice hockey player
- Theodore McCosh (1904–1985), American politician from Nebraska
