= Homer Boss =

American painter and printmaker

Homer Dean Boss
- Born: 1882; Blandford, Massachusetts, U.S.
- Died: 1956 (aged 73–74); Santa Cruz, New Mexico, U.S.
- Occupations: Painter, printmaker, art instructor
- Spouse: Suzanne/Susan Kutka Boss (married 1927)
- Children: 0
- Relatives: Anne Kutka McCosh (sister-in-law) David McCosh (brother-in-law)

Homer Boss (1882–1956) was a painter, printmaker and advanced art instructor of the early 20th century Modern art movement in America. He first taught at the Henri School of Art in 1909. Boss ended up purchasing the school in 1910 from his former teacher, Robert Henri, and later renamed it the Independent School of Art. Among those that gave Boss accolades for their own success was famed Brazilian modernist Anita Malfatti, and many of her most lauded paintings were created during this period while she was under his instruction. Boss later taught for two decades at the Art Students League of New York where he met his future wife, Suzanne Kutka. He also taught at the New York School of Fine and Applied Art (later known as the Parsons School of Design) and for a few years at the New York School of Applied Design for Women. Boss had a studio in Santa Cruz, New Mexico for the remaining 25 years of his life and it was there that he painted many of his most famous landscapes, as well as portraits of American Indians.

His oil paintings have appeared in many exhibitions, including the original Armory Show of 1913 and the 1913 Armory Show 50th Anniversary Exhibition of 1963. Boss illustrated two books by German author Waldemar Bonsels: the children's book Maya the Bee (1912) and the young adult book Heaven Folk (1915). His wood cuts, portraits and landscapes can be found in many prestigious museums including a full length portrait, among others, at the Chazen Museum of Art on the campus of the University of Wisconsin–Madison and a woodcut in the collection of the National Gallery of Art. Some other galleries with Boss works in their permanent collections include the Baltimore Museum of Art, Denver Art Museum, Georgia Museum of Art, Hunter Museum of American Art, Mennello Museum of American Art, New Mexico Museum of Art, Philadelphia Museum of Art, and the National Arts Club.
