= Maya the Bee: The Golden Orb =

2021 animated film

- Theatrical release poster
- Directed by: Noel Cleary
- Screenplay by: Fin Edquist
- Story by: Noel Cleary; Fin Edquist; Tess Meyer; Tracy Lenon; Adam Rainford
- Based on: The Adventures of Maya the Bee by Waldemar Bonsels
- Produced by: Tracy Lenon; Brian Rosen; Benjamin Ey
- Starring: Coco Jack Gillies; Benson Jack Anthony; Frances Berry; Christian Charisiou; Justine Clarke
- Edited by: Adam Rainford
- Music by: Ute Engelhardt
- Production companies: Studio 100 Film; Studio 100 Media; Flying Bark Productions; ZDF
- Distributed by: StudioCanal (Australia); Leonine Distribution (Germany)
- Release dates: 7 January 2021 (Australia); 5 May 2022 (Germany)
- Running time: 88 minutes
- Countries: Australia; Germany
- Language: English
- Box office: $3.7 million

Maya the Bee: The Golden Orb (also called Maya the Bee 3: The Golden Orb) is a 2021 animated adventure comedy film directed by Noel Cleary.

Loosely based on characters from the 1975 anime Maya the Honey Bee and the German children's book The Adventures of Maya the Bee by Waldemar Bonsels, the film is a sequel to the 2018 film Maya the Bee: The Honey Games, and stars the original voice cast of Coco Jack Gillies, Benson Jack Anthony, Frances Berry and Christian Charisiou. The Golden Orb was originally scheduled to be released in Australia on 17 June 2020, but due to the COVID-19 pandemic, the film was pushed back to 7 January 2021.

== Plot ==
In Poppy Meadow, Maya is full of the joys of spring as she tries to wake the hive and Willy to let them know that spring has finally arrived, but the others went back to sleep. Maya and Willy go to the glow worms, but they wreck the hive and the precious sunstone, much to the displeasure of the Queen. Maya overhears that she and Willy are to be separated because of their calamitous partnership and she needs no further invitation to get away from the hive to do something special to prove her and Willy's worth to stay together.

This opportunity comes in the unexpected guise of a passing green ant who is on the run from the muscle-bound beetle boom-bugs, who are after the golden orb he is carrying. The ant names him Chomp and hands the golden orb to Maya and Willy. They meet up with Arnie and Barney to take the orb back to Bonsai Peak. It turns out this golden orb is the egg of the ant princess whom she calls herself Smoosh, the heir to the ant kingdom. Maya holds Smoosh to greet him, but Smoosh does not understand Maya's name, until it lets out a fart to Willy as a gift. Meanwhile, at the hive, Crawley tries fixing the sunstone, but to no avail, much to his dismay. Miss Cassandra calls out that Maya and Willy has left the meadow.

Smoosh begins to cry so Willy tries to sing in panic until they were frightened by the ants again. Willy does not think they can keep going and decided to stop and rest. Meanwhile, the hive is over the place trying to find Maya and Willy. Arnie and Barney make something to cool them down. Maya sings Smoosh a lullaby while placing a diaper on her, but it was too dark and Smoosh was afraid. Willy sings a lullaby to her just like Maya did earlier, but feeling tired.

Chomp knows about Maya and Willy and follows Flip and Miss Cassandra to find Maya and Willy while Crawley stays behind. Arnie and Barney complain about their hatred of spiky trees with Maya joining in until they find Loggy Hollow, but they are caught by the beetles again. Maya and Willy find a wanted poster and Willy is ready to give up. They argue until they see that Smoosh disappeared. Maya throws a ball then grabs Smoosh and quickly flies away, she then finds Willy, Arnie and Barney, until the beetles come back again. They quickly ride on a leaf to get away until Rumba is caught in the river and needs saving quickly. Maya and Willy reconcile their arguments and decide to take Smoosh back to Greenleaf. Bumbulus, Henchie, and Boof block their path and send them to a dark cave where they cannot escape.

Maya becomes crestfallen when she realises that they have failed their mission until Miss Cassandra, Flip and Chomp arrive to rescue them. Rumba make amends with Maya and Willy and they warn the ants of Greenleaf about Bumbulus' plan to dispose of Greenleaf and the only way to stop him is to sing a little song. Then a bird arrives and the fight begins. Bumbulus is inside when Willy appears. When the sun finally rises, they join into a huge shadow spider, scaring away the birds just seconds before the boom bugs are eaten. Afterwards, Maya and Willy reunite and Smoosh finally says Maya's name. Bumbulus apologizes for his selfishness, finally sees Rumba as an "amazing tracker", Rumba says the ants and beetles work in peace and build a new colony, and Bonsai Peak is saved, thus protecting it from further threats. Maya and Willy return to the hive and the Queen congratulates them for their journey and decides to not separate them, and thus the spring festival finally now begins.

== Cast ==
- Coco Jack Gillies as Maya
- Benson Jack Anthony as Willy, Maya's best friend.
- Frances Berry as Rumba
- Christian Charisiou as Bumbulus, Rumba's brother.
- Justine Clarke as the Queen, the ruler of the hive.
- Noel Cleary as Henchie
- Callan Colley as Boof
- Jimmy James Eaton as Crawley, the Queen's assistant.
- David Collins as Arnie
- Shane Dundas as Barney
- Evie Gillies as Smoosh
- Darren Sabadina as Lief Cutterson
- Tom Cossettini as Chomp
- Tess Meyer as Miss Cassandra. She was originally voiced by Justine Clarke in the first film, and was absent in the second film.
- Sam Haft as Flip. He was originally voiced by Richard Roxburgh in the first two films.
- Tin Pang as Weeble
- Cam Ralph as Colonel
- Jordan Rainford as Interpreter

== Production ==
The box office successes of the first two films, Maya the Bee Movie (2014) and Maya the Bee: The Honey Games (2018), convinced the creative teams in Germany (Studio 100 Film) and Australia (Studio B) to create a third film. The teams wanted to create another story under the guiding principle of "friendship and helping others" that define character of the protagonist Maya, but with a theme different from the first two films. Director Noel Cleary wanted to create a "road movie" where Maya leaves her home, Poppy Meadow, that additionally involved high storytelling stakes.
