= Maya the Bee (film) =

2014 animated film

- Theatrical release poster
- Directed by: Alexs Stadermann
- Screenplay by: Fin Edquist; Marcus Sauermann
- Story by: Alexs Stadermann
- Based on: The Adventures of Maya the Bee by Waldemar Bonsels
- Produced by: Thorsten Wegener; Barbara Stephen
- Starring: Coco Jack Gillies; Jacki Weaver; Richard Roxburgh; Noah Taylor; Justine Clarke; Miriam Margolyes; Shane Dundas; David Collins; Andy McPhee; Kodi Smit-McPhee
- Edited by: Adam Smith
- Music by: Ute Engelhardt
- Production companies: Studio 100 Film; Studio 100 Media; Buzz Studios; ZDF
- Distributed by: Universum Film (Germany); StudioCanal (Australia)
- Release dates: 11 September 2014 (Germany); 1 November 2014 (Australia)
- Running time: 88 minutes
- Countries: Germany; Australia
- Language: English
- Box office: $29.6 million

Maya the Bee (promoted theatrically as Maya the Bee Movie) is a 2014 animated adventure comedy film directed by Alexs Stadermann, loosely based on the 1975 anime Maya the Honey Bee as well as indirectly on the German children's book The Adventures of Maya the Bee by Waldemar Bonsels. The first animated film in the Maya the Bee franchise, it was produced by Studio 100 Film and Buzz Studios, and distributed by StudioCanal in Australia and by Universum Film in Germany. It features the voices of Coco Jack Gillies, Kodi Smit-McPhee, Noah Taylor, Richard Roxburgh, Jacki Weaver, Justine Clarke, The Umbilical Brothers, and Miriam Margolyes.

Maya the Bee was released theatrically on 4 September 2014. The film received mixed reviews from critics, but grossed $29.6 million worldwide. Two sequels and spin-off to Maya the Bee were released: The Honey Games in 2018, The Golden Orb in 2021, and Arnie & Barney: The Water Quest in 2026.

== Plot ==
Maya is a young bee, who does not like to follow the rules of the hive. One rule is to not trust any hornets that live beyond the meadow. The Royal Jelly is stolen, and the hornets are suspected to be the ones who have stolen it, with Maya as the suspect accomplice. Nobody in the hive believes that she is innocent, and nobody except for her best friend Willy stands by her. They journey to the hive of the hornets, and Maya and Willy discover the culprit. The two friends bond with the other members of the opulent meadow.

== Voice cast ==
- Coco Jack Gillies as Maya, a young bee girl
- Kodi Smit-McPhee as Willy, a young bee boy, Maya's best friend
- Joel Franco as Sting, a young hornet, Maya and Willy's best friend and sidekick
- Richard Roxburgh as Flip, a grasshopper
- Justine Clarke as Miss Cassandra, a bee teacher at the bee school and Maya's mother at heart
- Jacki Weaver as Buzzlina Von Beena, the royal counselor of the beehive and Maya's arch-enemy
- Andy McPhee as Hank, the leader of hornets, Sting's father, Bees friends, and former arch-rivals
- Miriam Margolyes as The Queen, the mother of Bees
- David Collins as Arnie, an ant soldier, Paul's right-hand
- Shane Dundas as Barney, an ant soldier, Arnie's partner and Paul's right-hand
- Jimmy James Eaton as Paul, an ant colonel, the leader of ants
- Heather Mitchell as The Nurse, chief of the worker bees
- Noah Taylor as Crawley, the hilariously bumbling of the beehive, The Queen's loyal assistant and Buzzlina's former henchman
- Cameron Ralph as Momo, a moth
- Glenn Fraser as Kurt, a dung beetle
- Heather Mitchell as Thekla, an evil and stubborn bug-eating spider
- Stavroula Mountzouris as Lara, a ladybug who is Willy's love interest
- Sam Haft as Drago, a dragonfly

== Production ==
Universum Film distributed the film in German-speaking territories through Buena Vista International in Germany and Kinostar in Austria, (Note: Attributed to multiple references:) while StudioCanal handled the distribution in Australasia. The film is directed by Alexs Stadermann, and produced by Patrick Elmendorff and Thorsten Wegener from Studio 100 Film in Munich; and Jim Ballantine and Barbara Stephen from Buzz Studios in Sydney. The film was produced in association with the channel ZDF. The film's animation was provided by Flying Bark Productions. This film was Coco Jack Gillies' film debut, voicing the role of Maya. Gillies was 9 years old at the time of production.

== Reception ==
On the review aggregator website Rotten Tomatoes, 47% of 17 critics' reviews are positive, with an average rating of 5.6/10. Metacritic, which uses a weighted average, assigned the film a score of 49 out of 100, based on 7 critics, indicating "mixed or average" reviews.

Frank Hatherley of Screen Daily positively assessed the visuals and action scenes, along with Coco Jack Gillies' performance as Maya. In one of his articles for Variety, Peter Debruge felt the plot was "innocuous and uninspired as preschool animation gets" and criticised the character designs as "rudimentary at best", but he considered it a "relief to parents exhausted by the overly antic quality of all those other bug stories" and praised the target audience's interest in Maya's interaction with the other Poppy Meadow insects. Although Michael Rechtstaffen of The Hollywood Reporter thought the film would not generate "much of a buzz beyond female preschoolers", he praised its story as well as the cast's performances.

Charles Solomon of the Los Angeles Times questioned the film's dialogue and ending scenes, and later called it a "self-consciously uplifting treacle some adults insist kids want". Writing for The Sydney Morning Herald, Jake Wilson called the film's plot a "wearyingly familiar story", but praised the animation as well as Maya's characterisation.

=== Accolades ===
Award	Category	Subject	Result
Asia Pacific Screen Awards	Best Animated Feature Film	Barbara Stephen & Thorsten Wegener	Nominated
Bavarian Film Awards	Best Animated Film	Patrick Elemendorff & Thorsten Wegener	Won
Screen Producers Australia Award	Best Feature Film Production	Barbara Stephen & Thorsten Wegener	Nominated
Seattle International Film Festival	Youth Jury Award	Alexs Stadermann	Nominated
Stockholm International Film Festival	Grand Jury Prize for Best Film	Alexs Stadermann	Nominated

== Sequels and spin-off ==
A sequel, Maya the Bee: The Honey Games, was released on 26 July 2018. Another sequel, Maya the Bee: The Golden Orb, was released on 7 January 2021. A spin-off film, titled Arnie & Barney: The Water Quest, was released on September 3, 2026.

== See also ==
- Maya the Honey Bee
