= Maya the Bee: The Honey Games =

2018 animated film

- Theatrical release poster
- Directed by: Noel Cleary; Sergio Delfino
- Screenplay by: Fin Edquist; Adrian Bickenbach
- Story by: Fin Edquist; Alexs Stadermann; Noel Cleary; Sergio Delfino
- Based on: The Adventures of Maya the Bee by Waldemar Bonsels
- Produced by: Tracy Lenon; Thorsten Wegener; Brian Rosen
- Starring: Coco Jack Gilles; Benson Jack Anthony; Richard Roxburgh; Rupert Degas; Cam Ralph; Justine Clarke; The Umbilical Brothers
- Edited by: Adam Rainford
- Music by: Ute Engelhardt
- Production companies: Studio 100 Film; Studio 100 Media; Studio 100 Animation; Flying Bark Productions; ZDF
- Distributed by: Universum Film (Germany) (Note: Through Buena Vista International.); StudioCanal (Australia)
- Release dates: 1 March 2018 (Germany); 26 July 2018 (Australia)
- Running time: 85 minutes
- Countries: Germany; Australia
- Language: English
- Box office: $10.8 million

Maya the Bee: The Honey Games is a 2018 animated sports comedy film directed by Noel Cleary and Sergio Delfino. Loosely based on characters from the 1975 anime Maya the Honey Bee and the German children's book The Adventures of Maya the Bee by Waldemar Bonsels, the film is a sequel to the 2014 film Maya the Bee and stars the original voice cast reprising their roles from the first film, with newcomers including Rupert Degas.

Released theatrically in Germany on 1 March 2018 and in Australia on 6 July, the film grossed $10.8 million worldwide. A sequel, titled Maya the Bee: The Golden Orb, was released on 7 January 2021.

== Plot ==
In Poppy Meadow, Maya's hive is thrilled when they are invited to compete in the Honey Games in Buzztropolis after a poor harvest, but the catch is they must contribute half of their honey.

At the Games, Maya meets Violet, a competitor and Master Beegood's daughter. Maya convinces the Empress to allow her hive to fully participate, but Willy accidentally spills honey on the Empress, causing trouble. Maya makes a wager: if her team wins, all is forgiven; if they lose, all of her hive's honey is taken. On day one, Maya's team performs poorly but does not come in last.

On day two, the teams have to race up a tree to a flag. Maya, desperate to win, abandons her teammates. Violet's team places second, while Maya's team comes in third. Maya is rejected by her team for her selfishness and lack of leadership. She apologises to her team and vows not to disappoint or leave them like that again.

In the evening, Violet invites Maya and Willy to dinner, then bullies Maya and frames her for being mean, and gets Beegood to be on her side. Maya flies off, upset. Maya's team improves and prepares for the next challenge. On the final day, the teams navigate a maze without waking a tortoise. Maya's team wins, and Violet's team comes second. Maya and Violet race down a thorny hill, and Maya accidentally knocks over the Honey Cup. Maya is expelled from the games. Maya wanders off and finds Flip, and tells him why she is upset, and what had happened. Flip tells Maya to be responsible for her actions and admit what she did wrong. Inspired by Flip's advice, Maya reconciles with her team.

On the last day, Maya goes out and apologises to the Empress for breaking the cup. Maya is given a second chance by onlookers, and the Empress reluctantly agrees. Beegood tries to sabotage Maya's team by telling Violet about a secret tunnel her team can take to reach the finish line faster. During the race, Maya's team finds the goal, while Violet's team discovers that the tunnel houses Thekla, who lures them into her web trap. Maya's team rescues Violet's team and both teams cross the finish line together. Violet admits to cheating and apologises to Maya. The Empress is shocked but the Queen stands up for Maya. The Empress declares Maya's team the winners and forgives her.

At the after-party, everyone dances and enjoys themselves, including Maya, Violet, and Willy.

== Cast ==
- Coco Jack Gillies as Maya, a young bee girl.
- Benson Jack Anthony as Willy, Maya's best friend. He was voiced by Kodi Smit-McPhee in the first film.
- Richard Roxburgh as Flip, a grasshopper.
- Justine Clarke as The Queen. She was voiced by Miriam Margolyes in the first film.
- Jimmy James Eaton as Crawley, the Queen's assistant. He was voiced by Noah Taylor in the first film.
- Marney McQueen as The Empress, The Queen's sister, and the former sole antagonist.
- Rupert Degas as Beegood, Violet's father and the main antagonist.
- Linda Ngo as Violet, Maya's former rival and Willy's brief love interest, and the secondary antagonist.
- Stavroula Adameitis as Chelsea, Violet's friend.
- Tess Meyer as Sandra, Violet's friend.
- Cam Ralph as Bedford, a bed bug.
- David Collins as Arnie, an army ant.
- Shane Dundas as Barney, an army ant.
- Jordan Hare as Spinder, a spider.
- Jimmy James Eaton as Craig, a cockroach.
- Jane Ubrien as Thekla, a spider.
- Peter McAllum as Mantis, owner of the honey games.
- Sam Haft as Drago, a dragonfly.

== Production ==
Following the success of the first film, Studio 100 developed a sequel titled Maya the Bee: The Honey Games, the project that was initiated since 2015. Australian animation studio Flying Bark Productions and Studio B Animation co-produced and provided animation services while Studio 100 Film handled international sales.

== Sequel ==
A third film titled Maya the Bee 3: The Golden Orb was released on January 7, 2021 in Australia, directed by Noel Cleary and produced by Tracy Lenon and Benjamin Ey. The film was originally scheduled to be released in 2020, but was pushed back to one year due to the COVID-19 pandemic.
