= HGV =

HGV may refer to:

- Heavy goods vehicle
- Hypersonic glide vehicle
- Hepatitis G virus, or GB virus C
- HGV Video Productions, a former Canadian home video distributor

== See also ==
- HG5, Harrogate postcode area
