= SuperKlaus =

Christmas animated family film

- Directed by: Steven Majaury; Andrea Sebastiá
- Written by: Phil Ivanusic-Vallée
- Story by: Sylvie Bélanger
- Produced by: Dario Sanchez; Nacho La Casa; François Trudel
- Starring: Harland Williams; Colm Feore; Millie Davis; Paul Van Dyck; Lucinda Davis; Daniel Antonio Hidalgo; Tallula Dinsmore; Eleanor Noble; Wyatt Bowen
- Music by: Diego Navarro; Simple Plan
- Production companies: 3Doubles Producciones; Capitán Araña; Smartrek A.I.E. PVP Media
- Distributed by: Filmax (Spain); PVP Distribution (Canada); Pink Parrot Media (Worldwide sales)
- Release dates: 6 October 2024 (Sitges); 29 November 2024 (Canada); 5 December 2024 (Spain)
- Running time: 92 minutes
- Countries: Spain; Canada
- Languages: Spanish; English
- Box office: $1.3 million

SuperKlaus, previously known as 4 Days Before Christmas is a 2024 animated Christmas superhero comedy film directed by Steven Majaury and Andrea Sebastiá. The film is an original idea of François Trudel and was written by Phil Ivanusic-Vallée and Sylvie Bélanger. It features the voices of Harland Williams, Colm Feore, Milie Davis and Paul Van Dyck.The story follows Santa Claus who believes he is a superhero after hitting its head must save Christmas with the help of his head executive elf and an extremely intelligent girl.

== Plot ==
Longing for wilder adventures, Santa Claus's wish comes true when he accidentally bumps his head and starts believing he is/has SuperKlaus, the famous super-heroic Christmas Crusader. With the help of Billie a tech-savvy 11-year-old girl, and Leo his "Elf-xecutive" assistant, "SuperKlaus" will take on a megalomaniacal toy-obsessed businessman to save Christmas.

== Voice cast ==
- Harland Williams as Santa Claus who loves his job, but dreams of great adventures.
  - Williams also voices SuperKlaus, the famous super-heroic Christmas Crusader.
- Millie Davis as Billie, a bold, tech-savvy 11-year-old and a big fan of SuperKlaus.
- Paul Van Dyck as Leo, a sensitive, perfectionist, hardworking, elf
- Colm Feore as Frank Fafnir, a crooked business man with a double agenda.
  - Feore also voices Grumpus, SuperKlaus' archenemy.
- Lucinda Davis as Billie's mom, an engineer who is passionate about her delivery drones.
- Daniel Antonio Hidalgo as Billie's dad, a brilliant engineer and handyman, who has a quick mind and is full of humour.
- Tallula Dinsmore as Alicia, Billie's neighbour and new friend.
- Eleanor Noble as Alicia's mom.

Wyatt Bowen, Lucinda Davis, Tallula Dinsmore, Paul Van Dyck, Daniel Antonio Hidalgo and Eleanor Noble also lend their talent to additional voices.

== Production ==
The film is a Spain-Canada co-production between 3Doubles Producciones S.L., Capitán Araña S.L., Smartrek Films A.I.E. and PVP Media with the participation of RTVE, Canal+, RTVC and Radio-Canada as well as the financial support of Institute of Cinematography and Audiovisual Arts, the Government of the Canary Islands, Bell Fund, Canada Media Fund, Quebecor Fund, Shaw Rocket Fund, Crea SGR and ICO. The animation was done at 3Doubles studios at the Canary Islands. It is distributed internationally by Pink Parrot Media, in Canada by PVP Distribution and in Spain by Filmax with Pink Parrot Media handling the worldwide sales.

Family Channel acquired the series and the feature length in November 2024.

== Release ==
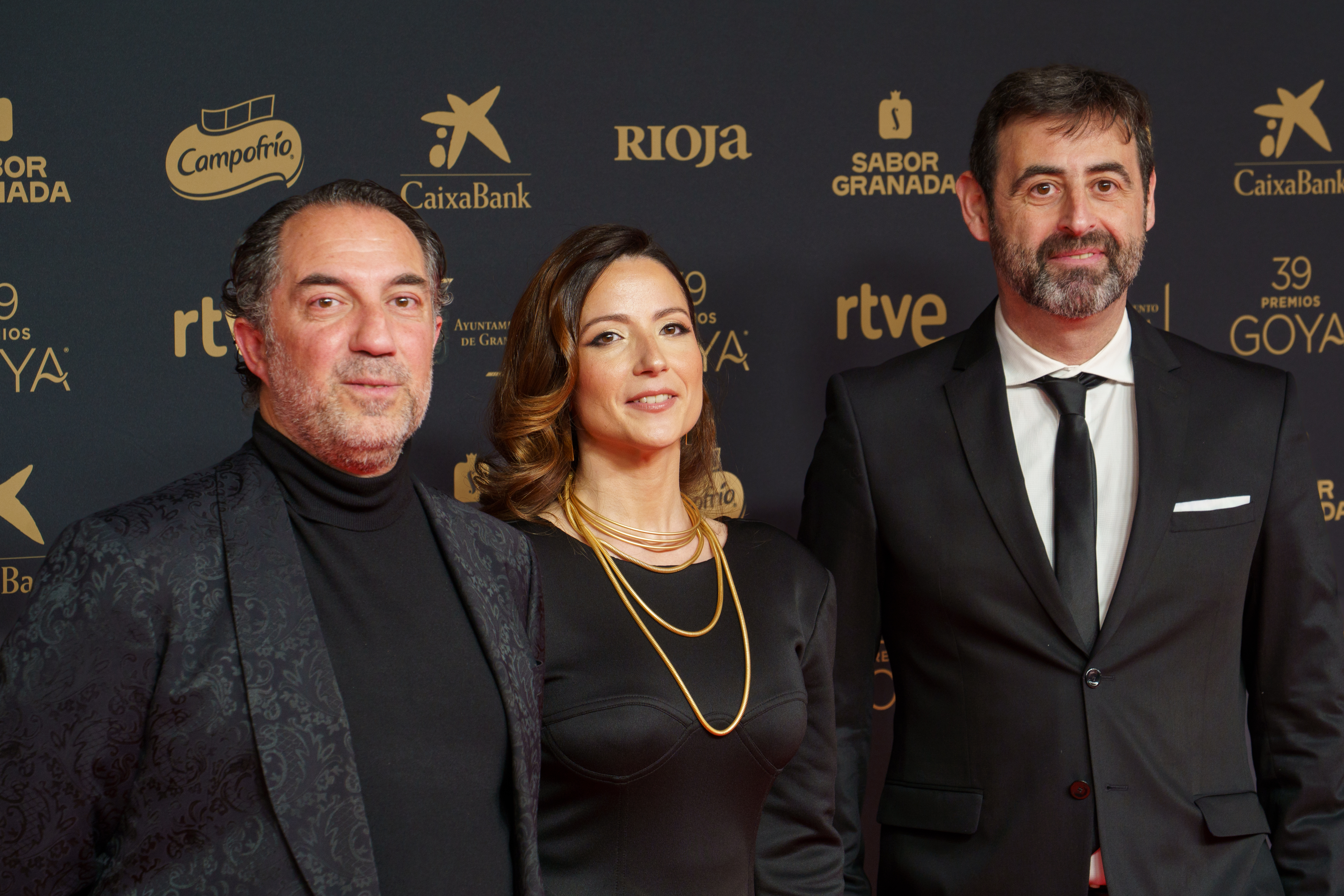
Darío Sánchez, Andrea Sebastiá and Nacho La Casa attending the 39th Goya Awards in February 2025.

SuperKlaus premiered in Catalan language at the 57th Sitges Film Festival on October 6, 2024. The film was released in the United Kingdom on November 1, 2024, by Altitude Film Distribution, following a DVD and VOD release on December 2. It was released in Spain on December 5, 2024.

It was released on November 15 as a series of 4 episodes of 22 minutes in English on WildBrain's Family Channel on Demand and will be on-air as a series as of November 29, 2024 and as the full movie on December 7.

The French version 4 jours avant Noël was released on Radio-Canada's streaming service tou.tv on December 3 and on air on December 21, 2024, as the complete film.

On its French territories, Canal+ released SuperKlaus in French as the series of 4 episodes of 22 minutes as of December 21, 2024 and as a full feature on December 22.

In the United States, the film would be released digitally and on DVD simultaneously by Shout! Studios on November 11, 2025.
