= The Adventures of Maya the Bee =

1912 novel by Waldemar Bonsels

- Author: Waldemar Bonsels
- Original title: Die Biene Maja und ihre Abenteuer
- Translator: Adele Szold-Seltzer (American edition); Charlotte Remfry-Kidd (British edition)
- Language: German
- Publisher: Deutsche Verlags-Anstalt
- Publication date: 1912
- Publication place: Germany
- English publication date: 1922
- Pages: 218

The Adventures of Maya the Bee (German: Die Biene Maja und ihre Abenteuer) is a children's book by the German writer Waldemar Bonsels published in 1912. The stories revolve around a little bee named Maya and her friends among bees, other insects and other creatures. The book depicts Maya's development from an adventurous youngster to a responsible adult member of bee society.

The book has been published in many other languages and adapted into different media. Bonsels wrote a sequel, Heaven Folk, which was published in 1915.

== Plot ==
Maya is a bee born in a bee hive during internal unrest: the hive is dividing itself into two new colonies. Maya is raised by her teacher, Miss Cassandra. Despite Miss Cassandra's warnings, Maya wants to explore the wide world and commits the unforgivable crime of leaving the hive. During her adventures, Maya, now in exile, befriends other insects and braves dangers with them. In the climax of the book, Maya is taken prisoner by hornets, the bees' sworn enemies.

Prisoner of the hornets, Maya learns of a hornet plan to attack her native hive. Maya is faced with the decision to either return to hive and suffer her due punishment, saving the hive, or leaving the plan unannounced, saving herself but destroying the hive. After severe pondering, she makes the decision to return. In the hive, she announces the coming attack and is unexpectedly pardoned. The forewarned bees triumph over the hornet attack force. Maya, now a heroine of the hive, becomes a teacher like Miss Cassandra and shares her experiences and wisdom with the future generation.

== Analysis ==
Sulevi Riukulehto suggested that the book may have carried a political message. This view depicts the beehive as a well-organised militarist society and Maya as an ideal citizen. Elements of nationalism also appear when Maya gets angry at a grasshopper for failing to distinguish between bees and wasps (whom she calls "a useless gang of bandits" [Räubergeschlecht] that have no "home or faith" [Heimat und Glauben]) and at a insulting fly, whom Maya threatens to teach "respect for bees" and with her stinger. Riukulehto interprets this to mean that respect is based on the threat of violence. Collectivism versus individualism is also a theme. Maya's independence and departure from the beehive is seen as reproachable, but it is atoned by her warning of the hornets' attack. This show of loyalty restores her position in the society. In the hornet attack part of the story, the bees' will to defend the hive and the heroic deaths of bee officers are glorified, often in overtly militarist tones.

After World War II, adaptations toned down the militarist element considerably, and reduced the hornets' role. The 1975 anime added the character of Willy, a lazy and quite un-warlike drone bee. In the cartoon series, the briskly marching, but ridiculously incompetent ant armies provide a parody of militarism.

== Publication ==
Deutsche Verlags-Anstalt in Stuttgart published the book in 1912. The first American edition was published in 1922 by Thomas Seltzer and illustrated by Homer Boss. The latter's wife Adele Szold-Seltzer (1876-1940), the daughter of Benjamin Szold and younger sister of Henrietta Szold, was the translator.

== Adaptations ==
The book had been adapted into film and television beginning in 1926 and since 2008, Belgium-based production company Studio 100 owned the franchise when its German distribution division Studio 100 International (known as Studio 100 Media at that time) had bought the film rights to Maya the Bee when they bought the series' owner EM.Entertainment alongside the Zuiyo library from Sport1 Medien (which was known as EM.Sport Media AG at the time). Studio 100 Media later bought out the remaining film and television, development and worldwide rights of the franchise from the Waldemar Bonsels Foundation one year later in July 2009.

Rights to the adaptations of the Maya the Bee books had switched hands in 2025, when the franchise's parent Studio 100 and its distribution arm Studio 100 International entered a strategic alliance with French digital-first kids' entertainment company and owner of the Spanish preschool television series Pocoyo, Animaj, to reimagine Studio 100's most famous children's brand Maya the Bee to shape the future of the franchise. As part of the deal, Animaj had acquired Studio 100's rights to the property including the 1975, 1979 (excluding Japan) and 2012 TV series outside of Belgium and German-speaking countries as part of Animaj's international strategy to acquire international IPs and turn them into global franchises with Studio 100 partnering with Animaj to expand the brand to digital and international footprint using the latter's GenAI animation production tools that would lead the franchise's future series content development and international expansion. Studio 100 retained the production, international sales and feature film rights to the Maya the Bee films that they produced including its spin-off Arnie & Barney and would continue overseeing global theme park rights to the franchise in its home country Belgium and German-speaking countries.

=== Screen ===
Crew	Television series		Feature films			
Crew	Maya the Honey Bee	Maya the Bee	Maya the Bee Movie	Maya the Bee: The Honey Games	Maya the Bee: The Golden Orb	Arnie & Barney: The Water Quest
Crew	1975–1980	2012–2017	2014	2018	2021	2026
Director(s)	Masahiro Endō and Hiroshi Saitō	Daniel Duda and Jérôme Mouscadet	Alexs Stadermann	Noel Cleary and Sergio Delfino	Noel Cleary	Sean Heuston
Producer(s)	Yoshihiro Ōba and Sōjirō Masuko	—N/a	Barbara Stephen and Thorsten Wegener	Tracy Lennon, Brian Rosen and Thorsten Wegener	Tracy Lenon, Brian Rosen and Benjamin Ey	Thorsten Wegener and Cathy Ní Fhlaithearta
Executive producer(s)	Kōichi Motohashi	Katell France	Jim Ballantine and Patrick Elemendorff	Barbara Stephen and Hans-Ulrich Stoef	Martin Krieger, Barbara Stephen and Thorsten Wegener	Martin Krieger, Geert Torfs and Paul Cummins
Writer(s)	Various	Various	Fin Edquist and Marcus Sauermann	Fin Edquist and Adrian Bickenbach	Fin Edquist	Fin Edquist
Composer	Takashi Ōgaki	Fabrice Aboulker	Ute Engelhardt	Ute Engelhardt	Ute Engelhardt	Christoph Zirngibl
Editor(s)	Masashi Furukawa, Hiroko Konishi and Hajime Okayasu	Johanna Goldschmidt	Adam Smith	Adam Rainford	Adam Rainford	Sean Heuston, Antoine Marbach and Ringo Waldenburger
Production company	Nippon Animation	Studio 100 Animation	Studio 100 Film; Buzz Studios; Flying Bark Productions	Studio 100 Film; Flying Bark Productions; Buzz Studios; Fish Blowing Bubbles	Studio 100 Film; Studio B Animation; Flying Bark Productions; Studio Isar Animation	Studio 100 Film; Studio 100 International; Studio Isar Animation; 3Doubles Producciones; Telegael
U.S. distribution	Nickelodeon	Sprout	Shout! Studios	Shout! Studios	Shout! Studios	
Released	April 1, 1975 – September 13, 1980	September 5, 2012 – August 23, 2017	March 8, 2015	May 1, 2018	January 7, 2021	September 3, 2026

==== 1926 film ====
German director Wolfram Junghans made a 1926 silent version ("starring" real insects). The film was lost for decades until the only original copy of the film was found in Finland. The material was restored in 2005 with a new musical score and released on DVD in 2012, in collaboration with the KAVI and the Bundesarchiv-Filmarchiv, and the film was screened in both Hamburg and Helsinki.

==== 1975 anime ====
The most popular and widely known adaptation of the story is the Japanese anime Maya the Honey Bee (みつばちマーヤの冒険, Mitsubachi Māya no Bōken; "The Adventures of Maya the Honeybee"). Originally aired on Japanese TV in 1975, the anime has been dubbed into 42 languages and screened on television in various territories. The Japanese TV series was preceded by Tokyo Kodomo Club's musical play based on the short story, presented as Mitsubachi Māya ("Maya the Honeybee"), distributed on an LP album.

The original theme was composed by Karel Svoboda and sung by Karel Gott in the German, Czech and Slovak versions, and Zbigniew Wodecki in the Polish version.

==== 2012 TV series ====
In 2012, Studio 100 Animation produced a 78-episode, 13-minute TV series. The series was rendered in computer animation. A second 52 episode season aired in 2017.

==== Film series ====
A film adaptation based upon the 2012 series was released in 2014. The film was followed by two sequels: Maya the Bee: The Honey Games in 2018 and Maya the Bee: The Golden Orb in 2021. A spin-off film, titled Arnie & Barney: The Water Quest, was released in 2026, with The Umbilical Brothers reprising their roles as the titular duo.

=== Stage ===
==== Opera ====
Maya the Bee also served as the basis for a children's opera written by the Croatian composer Bruno Bjelinski in 1963. In 2008 it was staged in Villach, Austria, as part of their Carinthian Summer Music Festival. This performance was distinguished by having the "bees" played by children and not professional opera singers as it is usually the case.

==== Puppet musical ====
Singer-songwriter Nancy Harrow created a jazz-musical version of the story, called The Adventures of Maya the Bee, that featured puppets by Zofia Czechlewska. Harrow's adaptation was produced in New York City by The Culture Project in 2000, and was revived in 2012.

==== Musical ====
In October 2016, Belgian company Studio 100 created a Flemish stage musical called Maya en de Pollenbollen based on the 2012 series that has the people dressed in costumes for the characters from the show. The musical contains songs made by Studio 100 with a few new songs created exclusively for the show. The musical centers around Maya alongside Flip and Beatrice celebrating Willy's birthday. The musical later returned in the Spring of 2017.

Since 2016, live actors from the original stage show make numerous appearances at numerous stage shows and special events held by Studio 100. Notably Studio 100's annual "De Grote Sinterklaasshow" held from late November till early December featuring Sinterklaas and Zwarte Pieten watching various Studio 100 characters such as Kabouter Plop, and Piet Piraat (including Maya and friends) perform musical numbers on stage. The same actress that portrayed Maya in the musical is also the official Flemish voice of the character and reprised her role for Studio 100's "De Liedjestuin" where Maya is singing various Dutch children's songs and nursery rhymes. In the French and Walloon version "Le Jardin des Refrains", Maya is played by a different actress.

=== Amusement parks ===
After Studio 100's acquisition of the franchise, Plopsa began expanding the franchise to its own theme parks. Plopsaland De Panne opened an indoor children's area called "Mayaland" on 3 July 2011, before the CGI incarnation's begun airing on numerous television stations across Europe. Maya, alongside Flip and Willy, would also appear at other Plopsa owned parks such as Plopsa Coo and Plopsa Indoor Hasselt. In Poland, Plopsa opened an indoor theme park called "Majaland Kownaty" which opened to the public on 28 September 2018, which is mostly themed to Maya the Bee but features other Studio 100's IPs (such as Bumba and Piet Piraat).

A year after Mayaland opened in Plopsaland, Holiday Park, Germany, a similar Maya the Bee children's area called "Majaland" opened on March 31, 2012.

=== Video games ===
==== Video game background ====
The Maya the Bee video games originated from a South Park video game for the Game Boy Color developed by Crawfish Interactive in development in 1998. The title was eventually cancelled due to South Park creators Matt Stone and Trey Parker stating that the game's mature themes would be inappropriate for the Game Boy Color, whose major demographic was children. A year later in 1999, the unreleased game's engine and assets were reused for two additional Game Boy Color titles from Crawfish and Acclaim – Maya the Bee & Her Friends, which was released exclusively in Europe, and The New Adventures of Mary-Kate and Ashley, based on the Mary-Kate and Ashley Olsen franchise, which was released in North America, being the first of the various video games based on the duo.

==== Games released ====
- Maya the Bee & Her Friends (Game Boy Color, 1999): developed by Crawfish, published by Acclaim.
- Maya the Bee: Garden Adventures (Game Boy Color, 2000): developed by Neon Studios and Kiloo, published by Acclaim and Plan-B Media.
- Maya the Bee: What a Thunderstorm (PC, 2001): developed by Junior Interactive, published by Tivola.
- Maya the Bee: The Great Adventure (Game Boy Advance, 2002): developed by Shin'en Multimedia, published by Acclaim.
- Biene Maja – Maja auf Blütenjagd (Flash, 2004): published by ZDF.
- Maya the Bee: A Wonderful Surprise! (PC, 2004): developed by The Web Production, published by Tivola.
- Maya the Bee: Sweet Gold (Game Boy Advance, 2005): developed by Shin'en Multimedia, published by Midway.
- Wer hilft Willi? (PC, 2005): published by Tivola
- Flieg, Maja, flieg! (PC, Tivola): published by Tivola
- Maja auf Blütenjagt (Flash, 2005): published by ZDF.
- Maya the Bee and Friends (mobile, 2006): developed by Kiloo and co-published by Plan-B Media.
- The Bee Game (Game Boy Advance, Nintendo DS, 2007): The Bee Game is an adventure video game released for Nintendo DS and Game Boy Advance, developed by German studio Independent Arts Software. The game lets players experience the adventures of Maya the Bee and her friend Willie as they search for their friends, lost from a strong storm that has blown through Corn Poppy Meadow.
- Maya (Nintendo DS, 2013): developed by Studio 100 and Engine Software, published by Bandai Namco Games Europe.
- Maya the Bee: The Nutty Race (iOS and Android, 2019): Mobile racing game, developed by Midnight Pigeon in cooperation with Studio 100.
- Maya the Bee RP (iOS, Android, PC, consoles, 2025): Roblox Game, developed by FXFX Studios in cooperation with Studio 100.

== Merchandise ==
Many companies contributed worldwide to the success of the character by producing and selling merchandising. Most of them were drawn between 1976 and 1986 by the French licensed characters specialist André Roche. His works have included motifs for textiles, porcelain, books, comics and games, including a campaign for Kinder Surprise Eggs.
