= Maya the Bee (TV series) =

Animated television series

- Title card
- Genre: Comedy; Fantasy; Adventure
- Based on: The Adventures of Maya the Bee by Waldemar Bonsels
- Written by: Various
- Directed by: Daniel Duda (season 1); Jêrome Mouscadet (season 2)
- Voices of: Andrea Libman; Rebecca Shoichet; Philip Hayes; Kira Tozer; Ellen Kennedy; Brian Drummond; Samuel Vincent; Diana Kaarina; Tabitha St. Germain
- Theme music composer: Fabrice Aboulker
- Opening theme: "Here Comes Maya the Bee"
- Composer: Fabrice Aboulker
- Countries of origin: Germany; France
- Original languages: German; French; English
- No. of seasons: 2
- No. of episodes: 130

Production
- Executive producer: Katell France
- Running time: 13 minutes
- Production company: Studio 100 Animation

Original release
- Network: ZDF (Germany); TF1 (France)
- Release: 1 February 2012 – 23 August 2017

Related
- Maya the Honey Bee

Maya the Bee is an animated television series produced by Studio 100 Animation in association with ZDF for Germany and TF1 for France. It is based on the character Maya the Bee introduced in 1912. This is the second animated adaptation focused on the character, after the anime Maya the Honey Bee that aired in the 1970s.

== Voice cast ==
Note: season one only

- Andrea Libman as Maya
- Rebecca Shoichet as Willy, Princess Natalie and Zoot
- Philip Hayes as Flip
- Kira Tozer as Miss Cassandra, Barry and Max
- Ellen Kennedy as Miss Bosby, The Queen, Thekla and Hannah
- Brian Drummond as Judge Beeswax, Kurt, Deez, Zip "Zig" and Edgar
- Samuel Vincent as Zap, Shelby, Paul, Stinger and Doz
- Diana Kaarina as Lara and Beatrice
- Tabitha St. Germain as Ben, Zoe and Lisby

== Series overview ==
Season	Segments	Episodes	Premiere date	Finale date
1	78	39	February 1, 2012	October 24, 2012
2	52	26	March 11, 2017	August 23, 2017

== Episodes ==
=== Season 1 (2012) ===
No. overall	No. in season	Title	Written by	Original release date
1 2	1	"The Birth of Maya / Take Off"	Valérie Baranski, Delphine Maury and Christel Gonnard	February 1, 2012
3 4	2	"Judge Beeswax / Willy's Bottle"	Michael Stokes and Joël Couttausse	February 8, 2012
5 6	3	"The Queen's Messenger / Beware of the Bear"	Steven Sullivan, Ursula Ziegler and Nicolas Gallet	February 15, 2012
7 8	4	"Maya to the Rescue! / Shadow Play"	Valerie Baranski and Louise Moon	February 22, 2012
9 10	5	"The Stranger / Misleading Appearances"	John Van Bruggen and Delphine Maury	February 29, 2012
11 12	6	"Sleeping Beauty / No Sleeping for Maya"	Phillipe Clerc and Nicolas Chretien	March 7, 2012
13 14	7	"Philibert / Dancing with Bees"	Pascal Stervinou	March 14, 2012
15 16	8	"King Willy / Night Blooms"	Louise Moon and Cathy Moss	March 21, 2012
17 18	9	"Powder Power / Royal Outing"	Sylvie Riviere, Nicolas Chretien and Joël Couttausse	March 28, 2012
19 20	10	"Keep Ball Rolling / Wild Bunch"	Mirielle Pertusot and Christophe Poujol	April 4, 2012
21 22	11	"Bee Clean / Crack"	Phillipe Clerc, Nicolas Chretien and Sylvie Barro	April 11, 2012
23 24	12	"Mrs. Hermit Beetle's Journey / Flying Licence"	Doldine Grimaldi and Jean De Loriol	April 18, 2012
25 26	13	"No Friend for Dino / Mother Courage"	Cendrine Maubourguet and Pierre Migeot	April 25, 2012
27 28	14	"Cake for the Queen / Ring-a Ring-a Caterpillar"	Jean De Loriol and Sylvie Riviere	May 2, 2012
29 30	15	"Hoverfly Spy / Shelby's Dream"	Phillipe Clerc, Nicolas Chretien and Christel Gonnard	May 9, 2012
31 32	16	"The Great Pollen Robbery / Maya's Garden"	Laure-Elisabeth Bourdaud & Johanna Goldschmidt, Henri Dubois & Christel Gonnard	May 16, 2012
33 34	17	"Max Has a Crush / Thekla Is In a State"	Phillipe Clerc and Nicolas Chretien, Eric Rondeaux and Catherine Le Roux	May 23, 2012
35 36	18	"Hive Jive / Sleepless Max"	Jean De Loriol and Klaus Döring	May 30, 2012
37 38	19	"What a Nice Wasp / Willy Moves Out"	Eric Rondeaux, Catherine Le Roux and Delphine Dubos	June 6, 2012
39 40	20	"Weather on Demand / Follow the Egg"	Nicolas Chretien, Sylvie Riviere and Phillipe Clerc	June 13, 2012
41 42	21	"In Search of the Lost Dung / Queen of the Solar Eclipse"	Phillipe Clerc, Nicolas Chretien and Adrian Bickenbach	June 20, 2012
43 44	22	"Henry's Cabin / The Haunted Hive"	Christophe Poujol and Sandrine Joly	June 27, 2012
45 46	23	"Bee Day / Wings of a Champion"	Heike Sperling and Jean De Loriol	July 4, 2012
47 48	24	"The Queen's Scepter / Night of the Giants"	Coline Abert, Catherine Guillot-Bonte & Christophe Poujol	July 11, 2012
49 50	25	"Edgar the Fearless / Molly the Miner"	Laure-Elisabeth Bourdaud and Johanna Goldschmidt	July 18, 2012
51 52	26	"Barry's Glasses / Bless You Miss Cassandra"	Phillipe Clerc & Nicolas Chretien, Laure-Elisabeth Bourdaud & Johanna Goldschmidt	July 25, 2012
53 54	27	"Alarm / Maya Commander in Chief"	Heike Sperling and Anastasia Heinzl	August 1, 2012
55 56	28	"Forbidden Fruit / Thank You Wasps"	Delphine Dubos	August 8, 2012
57 58	29	"Sulky Willy / Queen of the Day"	Phillipe Clerc, Nicolas Chretien and Sylvie Riviere	August 15, 2012
59 60	30	"Harmony in the Meadow / Willy Loses His Memory"	Christophe Poujol and Delphine Dubos	August 22, 2012
61 62	31	"Rainbow Pollen / Greedy Frogs"	Dodine Grimaldi, Sandrine Joly and Nicolas Chretien	August 29, 2012
63 64	32	"Dragonfly Express / On with the Show"	Coline Abert & Catherine Guillot-Bonte, Sylvie Riviere and Nicolas Chretien	September 5, 2012
65 66	33	"Night Flight / The Outsider"	Tony Scott and Pascal Mirleau, and Adrian Bickenbach	September 12, 2012
67 68	34	"A New Shelby / Willy Guards the Hive"	Sébastien Viaud, Muriel Achery & Chris Arsonneaud-Sache	September 19, 2012
69 70	35	"A Flower to Share / Did I Say That?"	Phillipe Clerc, Nicolas Chretien and Camille Hebert	September 26, 2012
71 72	36	"A Friend for the Oak / The Runaway Bee"	Anna Christien	October 3, 2012
73 74	37	"The Big Bad Earwig / Doc Slick"	Christophe Poujol, Pierre Spitzer-Couesnon & Édouard Petit	October 10, 2012
75 76	38	"The Gift from Above / Once Upon a Slime"	Ariane Capet, Pierre Spitzer-Couesnon & Édouard Petit	October 17, 2012
77 78	39	"The Big Eat / A Surprise for Maya"	Heike Sperling, Pierre Spitzer-Couesnon & Édouard Petit	October 24, 2012

=== Season 2 (2017) ===
No. overall	No. in season	Title	Written by	Original release date
79 80	1	"Roll on the Holidays / Yes Sir!"	Claire Grimond, Jean-Rémi François and Bruno Merle	March 1, 2017
81 82	2	"The Exile / Field Trip"	Sophie Decroisette, Frédéric Engel Lenoir and Bruno Regeste	March 8, 2017
83 84	3	"The Orchirosa / Flip Has Got the Blues"	Sophie Decroisette, Bruno Merle & Jean-Rémi François, Nadira Aouadi & Bruno Regeste	March 15, 2017
85 86	4	"The Meadow Friends / Ants See Red"	Claire Grimond, Frédéric Engel Lenoir & Sophie Decroisette, Bruno Merle & Jean-Rémi François	March 22, 2017
87 88	5	"Rosita / Theo"	Sophie Decroisette and Bruno Merle, Jean-Rémi François & Frédéric Engel Lenoir	March 29, 2017
89 90	6	"Treasure for the Ants / A Very Peculiar Mother"	Sophie Decroisette, Bruno Merle & Jean-Rémi François, Françoise Charpiat & Karine Lollichon	April 5, 2017
91 92	7	"Shadow of a Doubt / The Honeymunch"	Claire Grimond, Bruno Merle & Jean-Rémi François	April 12, 2017
93 94	8	"Long Live Freedom! / In the Ranks"	Bruno Regeste	April 19, 2017
95 96	9	"Jealousy / Bad Company"	Bruno Regeste, Bruno Merle & Jean-Rémi François	April 26, 2017
97 98	10	"Lovestruck / Stinger Stung"	Françoise Charpiat, Karine Lollichon & Claire Grimond, Bruno Regeste & Nadira Aouadi	May 3, 2017
99 100	11	"Maya the First / Blue Tit"	Bruno Merle & Jean-Rémi François, Françoise Charpiat & Karine Lollichon	May 10, 2017
101 102	12	"A Strike in the Hive / No Harmony for Beeswax"	Sophie Decroisette, Nicolas Schiavi & Shawn Mahoney, Hervé Benedetti & Nicolas Robin	May 17, 2017
103 104	13	"Fab Four / Big Ball"	Sophie Decroisette & Frédéric Engel Lenoir, Hervé Benedetti & Nicolas Robin	May 24, 2017
105 106	14	"Hive Certificate / Vote for Me"	Sophie Decroisette & Claire Grimond, Hervé Benedetti & Nicolas Robin	May 31, 2017
107 108	15	"Remind Me to Eat You / Sister Knows Best"	Nicolas Schiavi, Shawn Mahoney & Bruno Regeste, Françoise Charpiat & Karine Lollichon	June 7, 2017
109 110	16	"Question of Confidence / Flip Save the Queen"	Laure Doyonnax, Hervé Benedetti and Nicolas Robin	June 14, 2017
111 112	17	"Ballie Wallie Mystery / On Top Form"	Sophie Decroisette, Bruno Merle & Jean-Rémi François, Hervé Benedetti & Nicolas Robin	June 21, 2017
113 114	18	"To-Xi-Kant / For the Love of Max"	Nicolas Schiavi, Shawn Mahoney, Jean-Rémi François & Bruno Merle, Sophie Decroisette, Hervé Benedetti & Nicolas Robin	June 28, 2017
115 116	19	"Butterfly Effect / Willy's Misfortune"	Nadira Aouadi, Bruno Regeste and Laure Doyonnax	July 5, 2017
117 118	20	"Draw Me a Beeswax / Lara's Secret Love"	Françoise Charpiat, Karine Lollichon & Sophie Decroisette, Bruno Merle & Jean-Rémi François	July 12, 2017
119 120	21	"Private Property / The Killer Buzz"	Hervé Benedetti & Nicolas Robin, Sophie Decroisette & Laure Doyonnax	July 19, 2017
121 122	22	"The Fortune Teller / Willy in the Soup"	Sophie Decroisette, Bruno Merle & Jean-Rémi François	July 26, 2017
123 124	23	"Dung Ball Drama / The Plot"	Françoise Charpiat and Karine Lollichon	August 2, 2017
125 126	24	"Cool in the Cooler / Second Class"	Bruno Merle and Jean-Rémi François	August 9, 2017
127 128	25	"Little Treasure / Triple Trouble"	Françoise Charpiat, Karine Lollichon & Sophie Decroisette, Hervé Benedetti & Nicolas Robin	August 16, 2017
129 130	26	"Phobia / Maya Don't Go!"	Hervé Benedetti & Nicolas Robin, Françoise Charpiat & Karine Lollichon	August 23, 2017

== Development ==
Before the revival series was made, Belgian production company Studio 100 launched its Paris-based French animation production division Studio 100 Animation to produce revival version from the catalogue of its parent with Maya the Bee becoming its first production from the new French unit.

Two years later in April 2011, Studio 100 Animation developed a revival of the German book franchise Maya the Bee with French TV network TF1 and German broadcaster ZDF was onboard as co-broadcaster while Austrian broadcaster ORF brought free-TV and German language-rights to the series for that country.

== Controversy ==
In September 2017, parents spotted a drawing of a penis in the series' 35th episode. After the clip went viral on Facebook, Netflix temporarily removed the episode from the website. The episode subsequently returned with the offensive drawing edited out. The production company apologized to many fans and stated that it was "a very bad joke from one of the 150 artists working on the production".
