= Studio 100 Film =

German film sales arm of Studio 100 International

Studio 100 Film GmbH
- Type: Subsidiary
- Industry: Film production
- Predecessor: KirchMedia; Telescreen Film Producties
- Founded: May 20, 2013; 13 years ago
- Founders: Thorsten Wegener; Patrick Elmendorff
- Headquarters: Munich, Germany
- Parent: Studio 100 International
- Website: www.studio100film.com

Studio 100 Film GmbH is the Munich-based feature film production, distribution and international sales agency and production division of Studio 100 International, which in turned to be owned by Belgian entertainment company Studio 100, specializing in producing & handling distribution of children's and family animation feature films

== Background ==
Before the launch of Studio 100 Film, Belgian children's entertainment film Studio 100 entered the film production operations with the formation of a feature film production division called Studio 100 Film Producties to produce feature film adaptations of its properties mainly the K3 franchise for Belgian cinemas.

By May 2008, Studio 100 increased its feature film production activities with the acquisition of German kids & entertainment production company EM.Entertainment from German sports & media entertainment company EM.Sport Media AG, the acquisition of German kids & family entertainment production company EM.Entertainment by Studio 100 had gained access to the film catalogue of Australian animator Yoram Gross.

== History ==
The film sales division was formed in May 2013, when Studio 100 Media announced the establishment of a dedicated film production & international sales distribution division that would handle in-house theatrical feature film production and international sales entitled Studio 100 Film, the new feature film sales division would expand the focus of strategic focus into the international movie business for both animated and live-action projects by its Belgian parent Studio 100 with Studio 100 Media's managing director & CEO Patrick Elmendorff and the latter's business operations head Thorsten Wegener served as president of Studio 100 Media's feature film sales unit Studio 100 Film, with its first production was the German/Australian animated film Maya the Bee Movie.

In February 2017 when Studio 100 Film's parent Studio 100 Media had brought a majority stake in German brand management & media entertainment company Made 4 Entertainment (m4e) AG, which included its Dutch production & distribution subsidiary Telescreen, its own in-house feature film entertainment library and its feature film catalogues of German kids & family entertainment company TV-Loonland AG (including the library of Sony Wonder) and the library of Egmont's former Danish-based children entertainment arm Egmont Imagination four years after the launch of Studio 100 Film, Studio 100 Film's co-founder & president of its parent Studio 100 Media, Patrick Elmendorff, who founded the film sales division with co-founder Thorsten Wegener, had depatured the film sales division and its distribution parent with m4e's founder Hans Ulrich Stoef had been named as president of Studio 100 Film and its parent Studio 100 Media whilst founder of Studio 100 Film's Belgian parent Studio 100 & co-MD, Hans Bourlon, managed its distribution parent.

In November 2017 following the acquisition of m4e by Studio 100 Film's parent Studio 100 back in February that same year, Studio 100 Film announced a film adaptation based on the live-action/CGI-animated hybrid series Mia and Me named Mia and Me - The Movie was being in development with the film being produced by Studio 100 Media's German subsidiaries m4e & its joint-venture subsidiary Hahn & m4e Productions and Studio 100's Australian animation studio Flying Bark Productions would provide animation and co-producing the movie with a planned 2020 release date.

In July 2019, Studio 100 Film's parent Studio 100 Media had appointed former Studio 100 alum Martin Krieger as the new CEO of Studio 100 Film and its distribution parent Studio 100 Media.

In October 2022, Studio 100 Film had teamed up with Sydney-based Australian family film & television production studio Pop Family Entertainment & Irish entertainment studio Telegael to adapt Colin Thompson's book series The Floods as an CGI-animated Australian/Irish feature film adaptation entitled Being Betty Flood, the film would follow Betty, a headstrong, smart 12-year-old girl torn between her over-protective mother and her desire to prove her magical and musical abilities. As she navigates the challenges of growing up and finding her place in the world, her relationships with her family and friends echo the experiences of young girls all over the world, the film would be the first film to use Amazon Nimble Studio while Harry Cripps and Cleon Prineas would write the adaptation & Studio 100 Film, POP Family Entertainment and Telegael would produce it with Pop Family Entertainment's co-founder & CEOs Carmel Travers and Telegael's Cathy Ní Fhlaithearta serving as producers of the film while Studio 100 Film would handle worldwide distribution.

On October 1, 2024, Studio 100 Film alongside its international distribution parent Studio 100 International, the distribution arm of Belgian entertainment production group Studio 100, had jointly appointed former Telepool-owned Global Screen (now Global Constellation) manager of international sales, acquisitions & marketing Lucrecia Magnanini to become it's manager of sales & acquisitions for Studio 100 Film's international feature film projects and will handle Studio 100 Film's film slate and theatrical sales. Two days later on the 3rd of that same month, Studio 100 Film & its global distribution parent Studio 100 International had announced the first major feature film spin-off to the successful Maya the Bee franchise, centering on the fan-favourite recurring ant characters Arnie and Barney entitled Arnie & Barney: The Water Quest, The Umbilical Brothers had reprise their roles of the titular characters from the previous three films while Studio 100 International set to produce the spin-off alongside it's feature film subsidiary Studio Isar Animation and Canary Islands-based Spanish animation production porfolio 3Doubles Producciones, which Studio 100 International had brought a stake a year prior back in October 2023, and Studio 100 Film would handle worldwide sales to the film.

== Filmography ==
Title	Release date	Distributor	Notes
Maya the Bee	11 September 2014 (Germany); 1 November 2014 (Australia)	Universum Film (Germany); StudioCanal (Australia)	also known as Maya the Bee Movie co-production with Flying Bark Productions, Screen Australia, ZDF and Buzz Studios
Maya the Bee: The Honey Games	1 April 2018 (Germany); 26 July 2018 (Australia)	Universum Film (Germany); StudioCanal (Australia)	Sequel to Maya the Bee Movie co-production with Flying Bark Productions, Screen Australia, Buzz Studios and Fish Blowing Bubbles
Princess Emmy	28 March 2019 (Germany); 30 August 2019 (United Kingdom)	Universum Film; Kaledeoscope Film Distribution (United Kingdom)	co-production with Studio 100 Media, Witebox, Talking Horse, Animation Fabrik and Red Kite Animation
Vic the Viking and the Magic Sword	18 December 2019 (France); 2 September 2021 (Germany)	Leonine Distribution; SND Films (France)	co-production with Studio 100 Animation, Studio 100 Media, Belvision, SND Films and ZDF
Ella Bella Bingo	24 January 2020 (Norway)	Norsk Filmdistribujion	co-production with Kool Production AS and Gimpville AS
100% Wolf	29 May 2020	StudioCanal (Australia)	co-production with Studio 100, Screen Australia, Screenwest, Lotterywest, Create NSW, Siamese and De-Fi Media
Maya the Bee: The Golden Orb	7 January 2021	Leonine Distribution; StudioCanal (Australia)	co-production with Studio Isar Animation, Studio 100 Media, Flying Bark Productions and Studio B Animation
Mia and Me: The Hero of Centopia	26 May 2022 (Germany); 27 October 2022 (Australia)	Constantin Film; Icon Film Distribution (Australia)	co-production with Flying Bark Productions, Studio 100 Media, Studio Isar Animation, Constantin Film, Studio B Animation and Hahn Film AG
Giants of La Mancha	1 May 2024 (Germany); 8 August 2024 (Argentina)	Constantin Film; GF Films (Argentina)	co-production with Studio 100 Media, Studio Isar Animation, 3Doubles Producciones, GF Films, GGVFX and M.A.R.K.13 Film
200% Wolf	8 August 2024	StudioCanal; Atlantika Films (Spain)	Sequel to 100% Wolf co-production with Flying Bark Productions, Screen Australia, Screenwest, Lotterywest, Siamese and Atlantika Films
My Freaky Family	31 October 2024 (Australia)	Pivot Pictures (Australia)	Originally titled Being Betty Flood; co-production with Pop Family Entertainment and Telegael; Based on the book series The Floods by Colin Thompson
Heidi: Rescue of the Lynx	3 July 2025	Leonine Distribution; Selecta Vision (Spain)	A feature-length film continuation of Studio 100's Heidi by Studio 100 Animation, Jan Van Rijsselberge and Christel Gonnard; Based on the novel Heidi by Johanna Spyri co-production with Studio 100 International, Studio Isar Animation, 3Doubles Producciones and Hotel Hungaria Animation
Arnie & Barney: The Water Quest	September 3, 2026	Port-au-Prince Pictures	A spin-off of the Maya the Bee franchise by Waldemar Bonsels co-production with Studio 100 International, Studio Isar Animation, 3Doubles Producciones and Telegael
Flamingo Flamenco	October 22, 2026	Viva Pictures (United States)	co-production with Studio 100 International, 3Doubles Producciones, Viva Kids, Sumendi Uhartea and Telegael
Zac Power	7 January 2027 (Australia/New Zealand)	Paramount Pictures (Australia/New Zealand)	co-production with Flying Bark Productions, Cheeky Little Media, Pixel Zoo Animation and Australian Children's Television Foundation
Dougie Dolittle	2028	TBA	co-production with Studio 100 International, Studio Isar Animation, 3Doubles Producciones and Caligari Film
Halloween vs Day of the Dead	Q3 2028	TBA	co-production with Studio 100 International and Lunch Films
Emmi & Unipig	2029	Little Dream Pictures (Germany)	co-production with Carte blanche Media GmbH, Little Dream Entertainment, Amour fou Filmproduktion and Red Parrot
