= Benson Jack Anthony =

Australian actor (born c.1998)

- Born: ~1998
- Occupation: Actor
- Parents: Drew Anthony; Marianne Howard

Benson Jack Anthony is an Australian actor. For his performance in 800 Words he was nominated for the 2016 Logie Award for Best New Talent.

Anthony played Arlo Turner, a lead character in the family drama 800 Words, set in a beachside town in New Zealand. In 2016 he starred as Ethan in Emo the Musical and featured in 2019's Awoken. He voices the character Willy, Maya's best friend, in Maya the Bee: The Honey Games and Maya the Bee: The Golden Orb.

In 2019, Anthony filmed Fam Time for Channel 7 but the project was shelved until 2024 where it aired on Channel 7's streaming service 7plus on 11 July 2024.

== Filmography ==
=== Film ===
Year	Title	Role	Notes
2014	Prank	Sam	Short film
2016	The ATM	Kid	Short film
2016	Emo the Musical	Ethan	
2018	Maya the Bee: The Honey Games	Willy	Voice role
2019	Awoken	Blake	
2020	100% Wolf	Additional Voices	Voice role
2021	Maya the Bee: The Golden Orb	Willy	Voice role
2024	The Deb	Dancer	

=== Television ===
Year	Title	Role	Notes
2004	The Mystery of Natalie Wood	Eddie Canaveri	Mini-series
2008-10	Legend of the Seeker	Renn	2 episodes
2009	Sea Princesses	Various	Voice role, English version
2010	A gURLs wURLd	Finn	1 episode
2011	Underbelly	Newspaper Boy	2 episodes
2016	Cleverman	Gub	Recurring role
2016-18	800 Words	Arlo Turner	Series regular
2017	High Life	Benjamin Turner	Mini-series
2024	Fam Time	Rylan Box	Series regular

== Awards and nominations ==
Year	Award	Category	Nominated work	Result	Ref.
2016	Logie Awards	Best New Talent	800 Words	Nominated	
2016	Logie Awards	Graham Kennedy Breakthrough Star of Tomorrow	800 Words	Nominated	
2017	Melbourne WebFest	Best Supporting Actor	High Life	Won	
2018	Buenos Aires WebFest	Best Supporting Actor	High Life	Won	
