= Marianne Howard =

Australian actress

- Born: ~1966
- Occupation: Actress
- Notable work: E Street; Secret Valley
- Partner: Drew Anthony
- Children: Benson Jack Anthony

Marianne Howard is an Australian actress and TV presenter. She featured in the TV Series E Street and Secret Valley.

Howard's career started at age seven doing television commercials. In 1977 she appeared in the Potkoorok costume for The Nargun and the Stars although the series did not air until the 1981. From beginning of the ABC TV's Earthwatch series in the late beginning 1970s through to the final episode she appeared as a reporter and presenter. In 1981 she finished the last of her 26-episode run on Secret Valley which first aired in 1984. She played Alice on the soap opera E Street appearing in 240 episodes.

Howard went on to run Brent Street Studios with husband Drew Anthony and her sisters Jacqui and Karen.
