= Tokyo Kodomo Club =

Japanese early childhood education program

Tokyo Kodomo Club (東京こどもクラブ, Tōkyō Kodomo Kurabu), meaning Tokyo Children Club, is an early childhood education program published in Japan in an audio-visual format, distributed monthly on a record. The 7-inch record contained stories and songs, accompanied by a picture book that could be bound in a special folder. The early-childhood education program came in two courses: a 2-4 year old course and a 5-7 year old course. Each of the courses was designed to complete in 12 months. In addition on a quarterly basis, the Club sent out supplemental stories, songs and other music on a 12-inch record. The recitations on Side A were by "Uncle Maeda" (前田武彦, Takehiko Maeda), and on Side B, "Bin-chan" (楠トシエ, Toshie Kusunoki). The records were monaural recordings at 33-1/3 rpm. Presently, the recordings have gone out of print, making their procurement quite difficult.

== Programs ==
The programs were designed to familiarize children with stories and songs from around the world, with emphasis on European orchestral works. Main story narration often featured Classical music as a background music in order to help set the tone of the story. The bullets found in the index to each lesson were color-coded: red for the main story, blue for the songs and yellow for the occasional extra story. In the original course series, the main stories and songs were bulleted with a star and the extra stories with a circle. However, in later course series, they switched their bullets to red circles, blue squares and yellow triangles, keeping the same color code as before.

=== General Courses ===
==== 2-4 year old Basic Course ====
Unit	Side A	Side B
1	Introduction: This is Tokyo Kodomo Club; Story: Three Little Pigs	Song: Clinch and Open (むすんでひらいて, Musunde Hiraite); Song: Cuckoo, Cuckoo; Story: The Zoo (どうぶつえん, Dōbutsuen)
2	Story: The Tortoise and the Hare	Song: Tulips (ちゅーりっぷ, Chūrippu); Song: Elephant (ぞうさん, Zō-san); Song: Kewpie (きゅーぴーさん, Kyūpī-san)
3	Story: The Giant Turnip (おおきなかぶ, Ōki na Kabu)	Song: Chestnut Rolly-rolly (どんぐりころころ, Donguri Koro-Koro); Story: The Little Lost-one (まいごちゃん, Maigo-chan)
4	Story: The Town Musicians of Bremen	Song: Pigeon Coo-coo (はとぽっぽ, Hato Poppo); Song: Butterfly (ちょうちょう, Chōchō); Song: Sunset (ゆうやけこやけ, Yū-yake Ko-yake)
5	Story: Little Black Sambo	Song: Ant on an Errand (おつかいありさん, O-tsukai Ari-san); Story: County Mouse and Tokyo Mouse
6	Story: Roll-away Riceball (おむすびころりん, O-musubi Kororin)	Song: Bonfire (たきび, Takibi); Song: Swish-swish-swoosh (きゅっきゅっきゅう, Kyŭ-Kyŭ-Kyū); Song: March of the Toys (おもちゃのまーち, O-mocha no Māchi)
7	Story: The Wolf and the Seven Young Kids	Song: Swing (ぶらんこ, Buranko); Song: Hen and Chick (にわとりとひよこ, Niwatori to Hiyoko)
8	Story: Momotarō	Song: Reply of the Good Kids (よいこのおへんじ, Yoi-ko no Henji); Song: Horses (おうま, O-uma); Song: Pine cone (まつぼっくり, Matsu Bokkuri)
9	Story: Little Red Riding Hood	Song: Ladybug (てんとうむし, Tentōmushi); Story: Harumi and Natsuo (はるみちゃんとなつおちゃん, Harumi-chan to Natsuo-chan)
10	Story: Kintarō	Song: Crayon (くれよんちゃん, Kureyon-chan); Song: Let's Play (あそびましょ, Asobimasho); Song: Dragonfly's Glasses (とんぼのめがね, Tonbo no megane)
11	Story: Goldilocks and the Three Bears	Song: Crow's Seven Children (七つのこ, Nanatsu no Ko); Story: Kindergarten of Friendly Animals and Birds (なかよしどうぶつと小鳥の幼稚園, Nakayoshi Dōbutsu to Kotori no Yōchien)
12	Story: Hanasaka Jiisan	Song: Playhouse (ままごと, Mamagoto); Song: High-high (たかいたかい, Takai-takai); Song: The Flower Smiled (おはながわらった, O-hana ga Waratta)

==== 2-4 year old Graduation ====
Full of Stories (おはなしがいっぱい, O-hanashi ga ippai)
Side A	Side B
Baron Munchausen; Swan Prince (はくちょうのおうじ, Hakuchō no Ōji)	Nursing Father (とうさんのかんびょう, Tō-san no kanbyō); Little Women

==== 2-4 year old Graduate Course ====
Unit	Side A	Side B
1	Story: Hansel and Gretel	Song: London Bridge is Falling Down; Song: Bear Child (こどものくま, Kodomo no Kuma); Song: Scarab Beetle (こがねむし, Koganemushi); Song: Rock-Paper-Scissors (じゃんけんぽん, Jan-ken-pon)
2	Story: Pied Piper of Hamelin	Song: Button Boy (ぼたんのぼうや, Botan no Bōya); Song: Birthday (たんじょうび, Tanjōbi); Story: Chieko's Dream (ちえ子ちゃんの夢, Chieko-chan no Yume)
3	Story: Emperor's New Clothes	Song: Mr. Bunny in the Box (はこのなかのうさぎさん, Hako no Naka no Usagi-san); Song: Old Man Cobbler (くつやのおじさん, Kutsu-ya no O-jii-san); Song: Mr. Piggy (こぶたさん, Kobuta-san); Song: Blocks (つみき, Tsumiki)
4	Story: Jack and the Beanstalk	Song: Do-Re-Mi; Song: Mochi-making of the Mice (ねずみのもちひき, Nezumi no Mochi-hiki); Story: Ganchan's Dream (がんちゃんのゆめ, Gan-chan no Yume)
5	Story: The Three Wishes	Song: Buzz-buzz-buzz Busy Little Bee (ぶんぶんぶん, Bun-bun-bun); Song: Catch a Red Bird (あかいとりことり, Akai Kotori Tori); Song: Rain-fall Bear Cub (あめふりくまのこ, Ame-furi Kuma no Ko); Song: Sound of Bells (かねのね, Kane no Ne)
6	Story: The Honest Woodcutter	Song: Story (おはなし, O-hanashi); Song: Song of the Mountain (山のうた, Yama no Uta); Story: Miracle of Fire (火のふしぎ, Hi no Fushigi)
7	Story: The Dog and the Shadow	Song: A-ha-ha, A-ha-ha (あはは、あはは, A-ha-ha, A-ha-ha); Song: Tranquil Lakeshore Meadow (静かな湖畔の, Shizuka na Kohan No); Song: Parrot (おうむ, Ōmu); Song: Amusement-park Airplane (ゆうえんちのひこうき, Yūenchi no Hikōki)
8	Story: The Snow Maiden	Song: Under the Spreading Chestnut Tree; Story: Hiro's Adventure (ひろちゃんの冒険, Hiro-chan no Bōken)
9	Story: King Midas Has Donkey's Ears	Song:Mr. Soap (せっけんさん, Sekken-san); Song:New Home (あたらしいうち, Atarashii Uchi); Song:Potato (じゃがいも, Jaga-imo); Song:First in Being Early in the Morning... (あさいちばんはやいのは, Asa Ichi-ban Hayai no wa)
10	Story: Cinderella	Song: Chick (ひよこ, Hiyoko); Song: Playhouse (おままごと, O-mamagoto); Story: Adventures of Shin (新ちゃんの冒険, Shin-chan no Bōken)
11	Story: The Adventures of Mouse Deer	Song: Odds and Ends of a Child (こどものがらくた, Kodomo no Garakuda); Song: Tiger (とら, Tora); Song: Medicine Bag (おくすりのふくろ, O-kusuri no Fukuro); Song: Lunchbox (おべんとばこ, O-bento-bako)
12	Story: Ivan the Fool	Song: That Dog is Strange (あのいぬへんだ, Ano Inu Hen Da); Song: Mountain Waltz (やまのワルツ, Yama no Warutsu); Story: Canary that Flew into the Sky (空を飛んだカナリア, Sora o Tonda Kanaria)

==== 5-7 year old Basic Course ====
Unit	Side A	Side B
1	Story: The Happy Prince	Song: Sea (うみ, Umi); Song: Frère Jacques; Song: Dangerous Takashi (あぶなかったたかしちゃん, Abunakatta Takashi-chan)
2	Story: Old Man with a Wen (こぶとり, Kobu-tori [Jiisan])	Song: Cradle Song (ゆりかごのうた, Yurikago no Uta); Song: Evening of the Seventh (たなばた, Tanabata); Song: Magical Pocket (ふしぎなポケット, Fushigi na Poketto)
3	Story: Puss in Boots	Song: Sunset (ゆうひ, Yūhi); Story: World Travels of Usa and Mimi Rabbit (うさちゃんとみみちゃんのせかいりょこう, Usa-chan to Mimi-chan no Sekai Ryokō)
4	Story: Fūren Haze (from Shack Forest) (ふうれんもうろう(ふるやのもり), Fūren Mōrō (Furu-ya no Mori))	Song: Koinobori (こいのぼり, Koi-nobori); Song: Goldfish's Nap (きんぎょのひるね, Kingyo no Hirune); Song: Tomato (トマト, Tomato)
5	Story: Seven Stars (Russian Folktale)	Song: Satchan (さっちゃん, Sat-chan); Story: Word-play (ことばあそび, Kotoba-asobi)
6	Story: Straw Millionaire (わらしべ長者, Warashibe Chōja)	Song: If Guessed Right, You're Smart (あてたらえらいな, Atetara Erai na); Song: Ten Little Indians; Song: Camel (らくだ, Rakuda)
7	Story: Snow White	Song: Gargling (うがい, Ugai); Story: Counting Game (かずあそび, Kazu-asobi)
8	Story: Issun-bōshi	Song: Song of the Bird (ことりのうた, Kotori no Uta); Song: Jump-rope (なわとび, Nawa-tobi); Song: Spring Came (はるがきた, Haru ga Kita)
9	Story: Urashima Tarō	Song: Merrily We Roll Along (song); Story: Akio and Fuyuko (あきおちゃんとふゆこちゃん, Akio-chan to Fuyuko-chan)
10	Story: Pinocchio	Song: Mail Goat (やぎさんゆうびん, Yagi-san Yūbin); Song: Clock Song (とけいのうた, Tokei no Uta); Song: Mr. Moon (おつきさま, O-tsuki-sama)
11	Story: The Golden Goose	Song: Mountain Musician (やまのおんがくか, Yama no Ongakuka); Story: Spring Summer Autumn Winter (はる なつ あき ふゆ, Haru Natsu Aki Fuyu)
12	Story: The Giant Corn (American Folktale)	Song: Chatty Fingers (おはなしゆび, O-hanashi Yubi); Song: Hungry Song (おなかのへるうた, O-naka no Heru Uta)

==== 5-7 year old Graduation ====
Overture Collection
Side A	Side B
Light Cavalry Overture; Overture to Marriage of Figaro; Die Fledermaus Overture	Overture to Ruslan and Lyudmila; 1812 Overture

==== 5-7 year old Graduate Course ====
Unit	Side A	Side B
1	Story: Seal skin (アザラシの皮, Azarashi no Kawa)	Song: Don't-Know-Child (しらないこ, Shiranai-ko); Song: Boots (ながぐつ, Naga-gutsu); Song: Big Ol' Clock (おおきなふるどけい, Ōki na Furu-tokei)
2	Story: Brer Rabbit and Brer Fox	Song: Let's Hold Hands (手をつなごう, Te o Tsunagō); Song: Jungle-Gym Song (ジャングルジムのうた, Jangurujimu no Uta); Story: Ryūsuke (りゅうすけくん, Ryūsuke-kun)
3	Story: The Lion That Wore Glasses	Song: Race with Mom (ママとかけっこ, Mama to Kakekko); Song: Love to Run (はしるのだいすき, Hashiru no Dai-suki); Song: Shepherd's Daughter (ひつじかいのむすめ, Hitsuji-kai no Musume); Song: Amaryllis (アマリリス, Amaririsu)
4	Story: Ugly Duckling	Song: On the bridge of Avignon (アビニョンばしで, Abinyon-bashi de); Song: Slide (すべりだい, Suberi-dai); Story: Belly of the Earth (ちきゅうのおなか, Chikyū no O-naka)
5	Story: The Canterville Ghost	Song: The Boy Writes (ぼうやがかいた, Bōya ga Kaita); Song: If Mama Was a Baby (ママがあかちゃん, Mama ga Aka-chan); Song: Little "I dunno" (わからんちゃん, Wakaran-chan)
6	Story: Little Lord Fauntleroy	Song: Teeter-Totter (ぎっこんばったん, Gikkon-battan); Song: Don't Be Angry (おこりっこなしよ, Okorikko Nashi yo); Story: Let's Eat It All (なんでもたべよう, Nandemo Tabeyō)
7	Story: Gulliver's Travels	Song: Aunt Michelle (ミシェルおばさん, Misheru O-ba-san); Song: I've Been Working on the Railroad; Song: Doctor Eisenbart; Song: Cowboy's Yodel (うしかいのヨーデル, Ushikai no Yōderu)
8	Story: The Merchant of Venice	Song: Rocket (ロケット, Roketto); Song: The Old Gray Mare; Story: Electric Path (でんきのみち, Denki no Michi)
9	Story: Heidi	Song: Friendship Song (ともだちのうた, Tomodachi no Uta); Song: Tottotoko (トットトコ, Tottotoko); Song: Scissor Grinder (はさみとぎ, Hasami-togi); Song: My Bella Bimba (わたしのベラビンバ, Watashi no Bera-binba)
10	Story: Julia and Latos (ユリアとラトス, Yuria to Ratosu)	Song: Drops Song (ドロップスのうた, Doroppusu no Uta); Song: Wonderful Papa, Charming Mama (すてきなパパ おしゃれなママ, Suteki na Papa, Oshare na Mama); Story: Sky Journey (そらのたび, Sora no Tabi)
11	Story: Bluebeard	Song: Balloon that Climbed Up to the Sky (そらへのぼったふうせん, Sora e Nobotta Fūsen); Song: Found a Do-gooder (いいやつみつけた, Ii-yatsu Mitsuketa); Song: At the Tangerine Orchard (みかんばたけで, Mikan-batake de); Song: March of the Sea (うみのマーチ, Umi no Māchi)
12	Story: Noah's Ark	Song: Spring Breeze (はるのかぜ, Haru no Kaze); Song: Blue Sky Song (あおいそらのうた, Aoi Sora no Uta); Story: Toy Rockette (おもちゃのロケット, Omocha no Roketto)

=== Quarterly supplements ===
==== Seasons series ====
Unit	Side A	Side B
Autumn (あき, Aki)
Autumn (あき, Aki)	Song: Fall, Fall! (ふれー・ふれー, Furē–Furē)	Song: Song of Falling Leaves (おちばのうた, Ochiba no Uta)
Autumn (あき, Aki)	Song: Maple (もみじ, Momiji)	Story: The Tiny Violin (ちいさなばいおりん, Chiisa na Baiorin)
Autumn (あき, Aki)	Song: Chestnut Nut Boy (くりのみぼうや, Kuri-no-mi Bōya)	Song: Cricket (こおろぎ, Kōrogi)
Autumn (あき, Aki)	Song: Dragonfly (とんぼ, Tonbo)	Song: Insect Voices (むしのこえ, Mushi no Koe)
Winter (ふゆ, Fuyu)
Winter (ふゆ, Fuyu)	Story: The Little Match Girl	Song: Snow (ゆき, Yuki)
Winter (ふゆ, Fuyu)	Song: New Years (おしょうがつ, O-shougatsu)	Song: Snowman (ゆきだるま, Yuki-daruma)
Winter (ふゆ, Fuyu)	Song: Stare-down (にらめっこ, Niramekko)	Song: Icicle Measurements (つららのせくらべ, Tsurara no Se-kurabe)
Winter (ふゆ, Fuyu)	Song: Song of the Kite (たこのうた, Tako no Uta)	Song: Bean-toss (まめまき, Mame-maki)
Winter (ふゆ, Fuyu)		Song: Jingle Bells
Winter (ふゆ, Fuyu)		Song: Rudolph the Red-Nosed Reindeer
Winter (ふゆ, Fuyu)		Song: Joy to the World
Winter (ふゆ, Fuyu)		Song: O Tannenbaum
Winter (ふゆ, Fuyu)		Song: Silent Night
Spring (はる, Haru)
Spring (はる, Haru)	Song: Spring, Come! (はるよこい, Haru yo Koi)	Singing lessons
Spring (はる, Haru)	Song: Spring Came (はるがきた, Haru ga Kita)	Story: The White Carousel-horse (しろいもくば, Shiroi Mokuba)
Spring (はる, Haru)	Song: Nightingale (うぐいす, Uguisu)	
Spring (はる, Haru)	Song: Cherry-blossom (さくらさくら, Sakura Sakura)	
Spring (はる, Haru)	Song: It Opened, It Opened (ひらいたひらいた, Hiraita Hiraita)	
Spring (はる, Haru)	Song: Koinobori (こいのぼり, Koi-nobori)	
Spring (はる, Haru)	Song: Swish-swish-swoosh (きゅっきゅっきゅう, Kyŭ-Kyŭ-Kyū)	
Spring (はる, Haru)	Song: Springbrook (はるのおがわ, Haru no Ogawa)	
Summer (なつ, Natsu)
Summer (なつ, Natsu)	Song: Story of Natchan (なっちゃんのおはな, Nat-chan no O-hanashi)	Story: Thumbelina
Summer (なつ, Natsu)	Song: Star (おほしさま, O-hoshi-sama)	Singing lessons
Summer (なつ, Natsu)	Song: Song of the garden (おにわのうた, O-niwa no Uta)	
Summer (なつ, Natsu)	Song: Water-play (みずあそび, Mizu-asobi)	
Summer (なつ, Natsu)	Song: Frog Chorus (かえるのがっしょう, Kaeru no Gasshō)	
Summer (なつ, Natsu)	Song: Fireworks (はなび, Hanabi)	
Summer (なつ, Natsu)	Song: Snail (かたつむり, Katatsumuri)	
Summer (なつ, Natsu)	Song: Story of the watermelon (すいかちゃんのおはなし, Suika-chan no O-hanashi)	

==== The Purple Flowers ====
The Purple Flowers: Mother who Fell Ill (むらさきのはな：びょうきになったおかあさん, Murasaki no Hana: Byōki ni natta O-kā-san)

Side A	Side B
Song: Bear Climbed over the Mountain	Song: Mom is Busy (かあさんはいそがしい, Kā-san wa Isogashii)
Song: Meadow March (そうげんのマーチ, Sōgen no Māchi)	Singing lessons
Song: Mary Had a Little Lamb	
Song: Picnic (ぴくにっく, Pikunikku)	
Song: Song of a Bird (ことりのうた, Kotori no Uta)	
Song: Brahms' Lullaby	
Song: Found It! (みーつけた, Mītsuketa)	

==== Let's sing with Dad ====
Let's sing with Dad (おとさんとうたいましょう, O-tō-san to Utaimashō)

Side A	Side B
Story (1)	Story (3)
Story (2)	Song: Hol-di-li-di-a (ホルディリディア, Horudiridia)
	Song: Sur le pont d'Avignon
	Song: Sōran-tune (そうらんぶし, Sōran bushi)
	Song: Itsuki Lullaby (いつきのこもりうた, Itsuki no Komori-Uta)
	Song: At Uncle's Pastures (おじさんのまきばで, O-ji-san no Makiba de)
	Song: Li'l Eel, Li'l Carp (どじょっこふなっこ, Dojokko Funakko)
	Song: Egg and the Chicken (タマゴとニワトリ, Tamago to Niwatori)
	Song: Folktune from Kagoshima (かごしまおはらぶし, Kagoshima Ohara-bushi)
	Song: The Sea (うみ, Umi)

==== Uncle's Pastures ====
Uncle's Pastures (おじさんのまきばで, O-ji-san no Makiba)

Side A	Side B
Story: Uncle's Pastures (おじさんのまきばで, O-ji-san no Makiba)	Story: Yuka's Shopping (ゆかちゃんのおかいもの, Yuka-chan no O-kaimono)
Song: I've Been Working on the Railroad	Song: Let's Go For A Stroll (おさんぽしよう, Osampo shiyou)
Song: Summer Mountain (なつのやま, Natsu no Yama)	Song: Good Friend (いいなともだち, Ii na Tomodachi)
Song: Song For a Rainy Day (あめふりのひのうた, Ame-furi no Hi no Uta)	Song: Flower Ring (はなのまわりで, Hana no Mawari de)
Song: Moo Moo Cow (もうもううしさん, Mou-mou Ushi-san)	Song: Clip-clop Clatter-clatter (Poka-Poka Teku-Teku)
Song: Just One More Lullaby (もーつあるとのこもりうた, Mo-hitotsu Aru to no Komori-uta)	
Song: Gleaming Star (ちかちかおほしさま, Chika-chika O-hoshi-sama)	

=== Kodomo Concert Hall ===
The Kodomo Concert Hall series were recordings of the Tokyo Symphony Orchestra.

Unit	Side A	Side B
Kodomo Concert Hall No. 1: Introduction to the Orchestra (オーケストラ入門, Ōkesutora Nyūmon)	1. Tchaikovsky: Mazurka; 2. Strauss: Radetzky March; 3. Bizet: Carmen, Act 1, Prelude; 4. Rodgers: Do-Re-Mi	1. Brahms: Hungarian Dances; 2. Schubert: Three Marches Militaires, March No. 1 in D major, 2nd movement 3. Bizet: L'Arlésienne, Suite No. 2, 4th movement: Farandole; 4. Strauss: Tales from the Vienna Woods
Kodomo Concert Hall No. 2	Swan Lake	
Kodomo Concert Hall No. 3	Around the World in Music (音楽せかいめぐり, Ongaku Sekai-meguri)	
Kodomo Concert Hall No. 4	A Musical play: Maya the Bee	
Kodomo Concert Hall No. 5	The Nutcracker	
Kodomo Concert Hall No. 6	Peter and the Wolf	
Kodomo Concert Hall No. 7	Full of Fun Sounds (たのしいおとがいっぱい, Tanoshii Oto ga Ippai)	

=== Uncle Kōji's Story Bag ===
Uncle Kōji's Story Bag (コージおじさんのおはなしぶくろ, Kōji ojisan no Ohanashibukuro)

Story Bag No. 1: Why is the Ocean Salty? (うみのみずはなぜしおからいか, Umi no Mizu wa Naze Shio-karai ka)
Story Bag No. 2: Snow Woman (ゆきおんな, Yuki-onna)
Story Bag No. 3: Happy Flowers (しあわせのはな, Shiawase no Hana)
Story Bag No. 4: Cinderella of the Southern Isles (みなみのしまのシンデレラ, Minami no Shima no Shinderera)
Story Bag No. 5: Egg Number Three (たまごさいばん, Tamago San-ban)
Story Bag No. 6: Sun-shine and the Golden Chain (おてんとうさんときんのくさり, Otentō-san to Kin no Kusari)
Story Bag No. 7: Table-cloth from the North-wind (きたかぜくれたテーブルかけ, Kita-kaze Kureta Tēburu-kake)
Story Bag No. 8: Nightingale's Home (うぐいすのさと, Uguisu no Sato)

=== Sing in English Group ===
The Tokyo Kodomo Club issued two courses of children’s songs in English for the Japanese audience in the Sing in English Group (英語で歌う会, Ei-go de Utau Kai) series. These songs were sung by Esther Ghan and her children. The Let’s Sing English Songs (英語で歌いましょう, Ei-go de Utaimashō) course was designed similarly to their Japanese courses, where the lesson units were distributed monthly on a record. Each of the courses was designed to complete in 12 months, with the course set spanning two years. For the older children, Folk-album for All (みんなのフォーク・アルバム, Minna no Fōku-arubamu) in a set of six lesson units and a Christmas supplement were provided. It also spanned over two years.

==== Let’s Sing English Songs (1) ====
Unit	Side A	Side B
1	Ten Little Indians	(same as Side A)
2	Are You Sleeping ?	(same as Side A)
3	London Bridge	(same as Side A)
4	Oh Where Has My Little Dog Gone?	(same as Side A)
5	A Tisket, a Tasket	(same as Side A)
6	The Bear Went Over The Mountain	(same as Side A)
7	My Bonnie	(same as Side A)
8	Sailing, Sailing	Lovely May
9	The Mulberry Bush	(same as Side A)
10	Mary Had a Little Lamb	(same as Side A)
11	Twinkle, Twinkle, Little Star	(same as Side A)
12	Hush, Little Baby	(same as Side A)

==== Let’s Sing English Songs (2) ====
Unit	Side A	Side B
1	Six Little Ducks	(same as Side A)
2	Three Blind Mice	(same as Side A)
3	The Little Skunk	(same as Side A)
4	Simple Simon	(same as Side A)
5	Brother, Come and Dance with Me	(same as Side A)
6	Sweetly Sings the Donkey	(same as Side A)
7	Billy Boy	(same as Side A)
8	Row, Row, Row Your Boat	Merrily We Roll Along
9	The Muffin Man	(same as Side A)
10	Pop Goes the Weasel	(same as Side A)
11	Looby Loo	(same as Side A)
12	Three Little Kittens	(same as Side A)

==== Folk-album for All (1) ====
Unit	Side A	Side B
1	Happy Birthday to You	When The Saints Go Marching In
2	Puff, the Magic Dragon	Danny Boy
3	You Are My Sunshine	Greensleeves
4	Long, Long Ago	Cradle Song
5	Do - Re - Mi	Waltzing Matilda
6	The Camptown Races	Sipping Cider Through a Straw
X'mas	We Wish You a Merry Christmas; Jingle Bells	Silent Night; Auld Lang Syne

==== Folk-album for All (2) ====
Unit	Side A	Side B
1	Michael, Row the Boat Ashore	Rock a Bye, Baby
2	Did You Ever See a Lassie?	The Blue Bells of Scotland
3	To Market, to Market	Aura Lee
4	Believe Me, If All Those Endearing Young Charms	Annie Laurie
5	Hey, Diddle, Diddle	Early One Morning
6	The Man On The Flying Trapeze	Hush - A -Bye
Xmas	Santa Claus Is Comin' to Town; Deck the Halls	The Twelve Days of Christmas

=== Other ===
- Bin-Chan's Song and Story (びんちゃんのうたとおはなし, Bin-chan no Uta to O-hanashi): Spring, Springbrook (はるのおがわ, Haru no Ogawa), Koinobori (こいのぼり, Koi-nobori), Summer.

== Contact information ==
Original Address:

- Tokyo Kodomo Club
  15-5 Hachiyama-chō
  Shibuya-ku, Tōkyō, Japan 〒150-0035
- Postal transfer: Tokyo 5-88764

Current address:

- Tokyo Kodomo Club
  12-4 Asahi-chō
  Hachiōji-shi, Tōkyō, Japan 〒192-0083

== See also ==
- Disney Read-Along
