= Earthwatch (TV series) =

Earthwatch is an Australian children's television show produced by Jon Stephens and Harvey Shore. It aired on Monday afternoons on ABC TV from 1979 and throughout the early 1980s at 5pm within the Alexander the Bunyip Afternoon Show. A short Earthwatch Club bulletin also aired for a period on Thursdays at 5pm.

Earthwatch was developed as a response to Australia's increasing awareness about environmental issues during the early 1980s.

Earthwatch targeted school-aged children and was presented by young people who interviewed environmentalists such as David Attenborough and Australian Densey Clyne. One of the regular contributors was author and composer Brian Mackness. Mackness was an environmental consultant for the program since its inception in 1979. He wrote a large proportion of the scripts and music for the show as well as designing a community extension program to involve viewers in conservation activities.

Earthwatch had a news segment highlighting the latest important environmental issues, such as Aboriginal rock carvings uncovered after a bush fire in Sydney's northern beaches area.

The children's cast of Earthwatch also sang on an album of songs titled Earthwatch, which was produced, arranged and conducted by William Motzing and engineered by Yossi Gabbay.

The 1980 children's cast of Earthwatch included Marianne Howard, Eileen Matthews, Heidi Maguire, Rodney Bell, Marty Irwin, Garry Anderson, Tim Grogan, Nerida Clark, Jayson Duncan, Angela Gauci, Teresa Gutierrez, Martin Lewis, Adrian McLeod, Simon Major, Victoria Mielewska, and Craig Morrison, later joined by Anne-Marie Duncan.

The show was choreographed by Nancye Hayes in the early 1980s. Some of the episodes included Islands, Camping & Trekking, Myths & Legends, Rocks & Minerals.
