= Rock Bottom (film) =

- Mexican theatrical release poster
- Directed by: Gabriel Riva Palacio Alatriste; Rodolfo Riva Palacio Alatriste
- Written by: Gabriel Riva Palacio Alatriste; Rodolfo Riva Palacio Alatriste
- Produced by: Dário Sanchez; Ignacio Martínez Casares; Gabriel Riva Palacio Alatriste; Rodolfo Riva Palacio Alatriste
- Starring: Rob Schneider; Gabriel Iglesias
- Edited by: Gabriel Riva Palacio Alatriste; Daniel Othon
- Music by: Diego Navarro
- Production companies: Huevocartoon Producciones; 3Doubles Producciones
- Distributed by: Videocine (Mexico); LaZona (Spain)
- Release dates: September 3, 2026 (Mexico); October 30, 2026 (Spain)
- Running time: 88 minutes
- Countries: Mexico; Spain
- Language: English
- Box office: $0.34 million

Rock Bottom (Spanish: Gungo y los juegos cavernícolas) is an animated comedy film produced by Mexico's Huevocartoon Producciones and Spain's 3Doubles Producciones.

The English voice cast includes Rob Schneider and Gabriel Iglesias, while the Spanish version includes the voices of Ricky Limón, Karen Torres, Joaquín Cosío, Daniel Sosa, Silvia Navarro, Humberto Vélez, Mario Filio, and Raúl Aldana.

The film was first released in Mexico on September 3, 2026.

== Plot ==
Gungo, a spoiled young caveman, was banished into the wilderness where he enlists the help of misfits to compete in the caveman games, learning the true meaning of strength coming from teamwork and courage.

== Voices ==
=== English ===
- Rob Schneider
- Gabriel Iglesias

=== Latin American Spanish ===
- Ricky Limón as Gungo
- Karen Torres as Yahi
- Joaquín Cosío as Krull
- Daniel Sosa as Aysitú
- Silvia Navarro as Lana
- Humberto Vélez as Narizok
- Mario Filio
- Raúl Aldana as Cotton

=== European Spanish ===
The European Spanish release features the dubbing voices of YouTubers Mikecrack (as Gungo) and Dagar, and sports journalists Rubén Uría and Nacho Donado.

== Music ==
The film's score is composed and conducted by Spanish musician Diego Navarro at Smecky Music Studios, with performance done by The City of Prague Philharmonic Orchestra, with contributions from Leigh Phillips and Matthijs Kieboom.

=== Soundtrack ===
The film's score soundtrack album was released digitally by MovieScore Media on November 2, 2026.

Rock Bottom (Original Motion Picture Soundtrack)

Film score by Diego Navarro
- Released: November 2, 2026
- Genre: Film score
- Label: MovieScore Media

Diego Navarro chronology
Winnipeg, el barco de la esperanza (2026)	Rock Bottom (Original Motion Picture Soundtrack) (2026)

Rock Bottom (Original Motion Picture Soundtrack)
No.	Title	Length
1.	"Main Theme"	3:44
2.	"You Know How He Is"	2:12
3.	"Announcing the Games"	1:34
4.	"A Very Rare Sickness"	1:47
5.	"Let the Games Begin"	2:10
6.	"The Chief’s Position Is Being Questioned"	2:02
7.	"An Embarassing Competition"	1:38
8.	"Ayashure’s Theme"	3:33
9.	"A Messy Situation"	2:14
10.	"The Ultimate Host"	2:15
11.	"Ponk, Is That You?"	1:52
12.	"Shrooms – Diego Navarro & Leigh Phillips"	4:43
13.	"We Need to Explore"	0:54
14.	"Rugbee! – Diego Navarro & Leigh Phillips"	1:35
15.	"Hitching a Ride – Diego Navarro & Leigh Phillips"	1:05
16.	"Training and Celebrations – Diego Navarro & Leigh Phillips"	3:59
17.	"T-Rex Assemble – Diego Navarro & Leigh Phillips"	1:48
18.	"Asking for Help – Diego Navarro & Leigh Phillips"	2:45
19.	"Paintings – Diego Navarro & Leigh Phillips"	1:57
20.	"Team Parade – Diego Navarro & Leigh Phillips"	1:40
21.	"A Bad Start – Diego Navarro & Leigh Phillips"	1:35
22.	"Finding Dad – Diego Navarro & Matthijs Kieboom"	2:09
23.	"Trompo’s Rampage - Diego Navarro & Leigh Phillips"	4:20
24.	"The First Throw in History – Diego Navarro & Matthijs Kieboom"	2:29
25.	"Guinko – Diego Navarro & Matthijs Kieboom"	1:21
26.	"Flexy – Diego Navarro & Matthijs Kieboom"	1:42
27.	"Unmasked – Diego Navarro & Matthijs Kieboom"	1:52
28.	"The Games Begin – Diego Navarro & Matthijs Kieboom"	1:54
29.	"The Volcano Erupts – Diego Navarro & Matthijs Kieboom"	3:20
30.	"The New Chief – Diego Navarro & Matthijs Kieboom"	3:02
31.	"Here We Go! – Diego Navarro & Matthijs Kieboom"	2:12
32.	"Three Years Later – Diego Navarro & Matthijs Kieboom"	2:00
33.	"A Long, Long Time Ago – Diego Navarro & Matthijs Kieboom"	4:12

== Release ==
The film was first released in Mexico on September 3, 2026 by Videocine, and then in Spain on October 30 by LAZONA. International sales are being handled by Odin's Eye Animation outside of Latin America.

The film opened at #8, earning MX$5.4 million pesos ($0.31 million USD) on its opening weekend, making it a financial disappointment.
