= Drew Anthony =

Australian performer, director, choreographer and producer (b.1969)

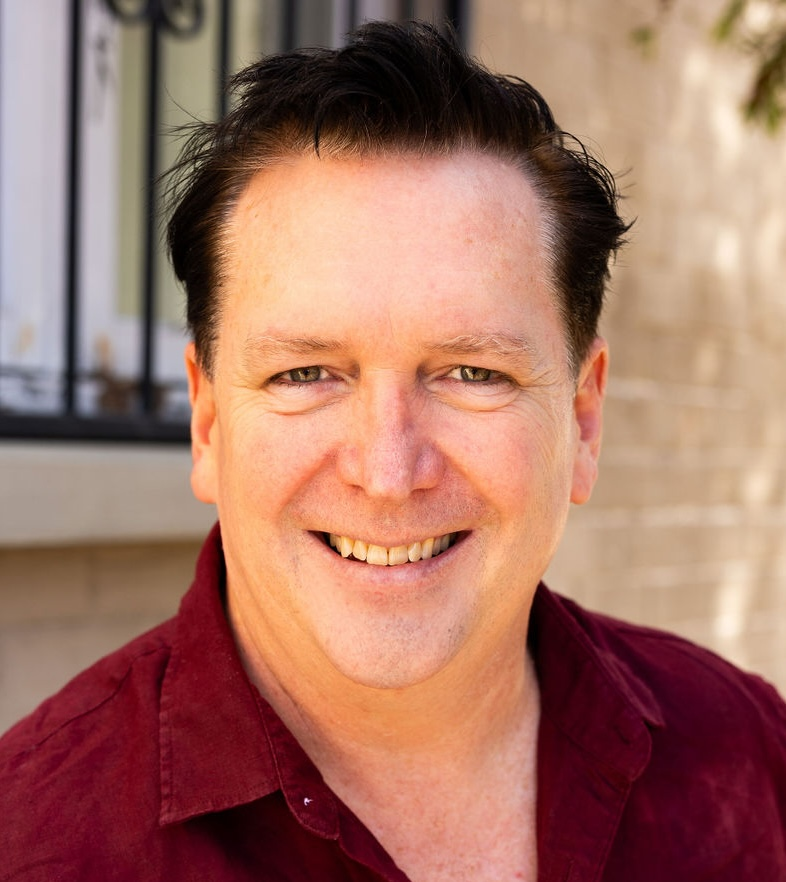
- Born: 14 January 1969 (age 57); Mackay, Queensland, Australia
- Occupations: Director, choreographer, producer, actor, presenter
- Years active: 1984–present
- Partner: Marianne Howard
- Children: 3 including Benson Jack Anthony

Drew Anthony (born 14 January 1969) is an Australian performer, director, choreographer, and producer. He has directed productions including Grease, Chicago, Strictly Ballroom, The Wedding Singer, and Saturday Night Fever. Other works include 42nd Street at Limelight Theatre and The Boy From Oz at The Empire Theatre. In 2021, he directed and choreographed The Boy From Oz at Crown Theatre.

== Early life ==
Anthony was born in Mackay, Queensland, and raised on the Gold Coast. His mother, Kay, ran a performing arts school, and his father, Bryan, worked for the Queensland Tourist Bureau in Coolangatta. He began dance lessons at age four and performed in musicals for the local Spotlight Theatre Company while attending Currumbin State Primary School and Palm Beach Currumbin State High.

In 1984, Anthony gained recognition by winning the Fred Astaire International Jazz and Tap Championship in New York City in both tap and jazz categories for his age group.

== Career ==
Anthony began his career performing in concerts, corporate shows, and local theatre restaurants. At 16, he joined Regmat Productions as a dancer at Wrest Point Hotel Casino. Shortly after, he was cast in the Australian tour of Me and My Girl.

Anthony was later cast in several Australian musical theatre productions, including Cats, Rasputin, 42nd Street, and Hot Shoe Shuffle. He appeared on television shows such as Midday, Good Morning Australia, and Mornings with Kerri-Anne. In 2006, he worked on the feature film Happy Feet.

As a choreographer, Anthony worked on Australian productions such as The Boy From Oz, Jolson, Buddy: The Buddy Holly Story, and Jailhouse Rock: The Musical in London's West End. He also choreographed Orpheus in the Underworld for Opera Australia and other shows for Rhonda Burchmore and Rachael Beck.

Anthony has directed various productions through his company, Drew Anthony Creative, including Grease, Chicago - a Musical Vaudeville, 42nd Street, Strictly Ballroom, A Chorus Line, Saturday Night Fever, The Wedding Singer, Footloose and Little Shop of Horrors. He has also directed productions like The Boy From Oz, High School Musical, Carlotta's KingsX, A Very PBC Christmas and A Very Musical Theatre Christmas.

He served as Associate Director for the Sydney 2000 Summer Olympics closing ceremony, the 2006 Asian Games in Doha, and the 2010 Winter Olympics opening and closing ceremonies in Vancouver. He has directed events such as the NRL State of Origin, the 2015 World Men's Handball Championship, and the Olivia Newton-John and Friends charity gala in Sydney.

In 2008, Anthony organized and directed A Musical Send Off, a concert benefiting the Australian Paralympic Team, which raised over $100,000.
