= Wehadkee Creek =

Stream in Alabama and Georgia, U.S.

Coordinates: 32°59′24.45″N 85°11′28.79″W

Wehadkee Creek is a stream in the U.S. states of Alabama and Georgia. It is a tributary to the Chattahoochee River.

Wehadkee is a name derived from the Creek language meaning "white water creek". A variant name is "Hoithle Tigua Creek".

== See also ==
- McCosh Grist Mill
