= 3Doubles Producciones =

Spanish animation studio

- Industry: CGI animation; VFX
- Founded: 2017; 9 years ago
- Founders: Darío Sánchez; Luis Torres
- Headquarters: Santa Cruz de Tenerife, Canary Islands, Spain
- Key people: Darío Sánchez (CEO)
- Parent: Studio 100 International; Viva Pictures
- Website: https://3doubles.com/

3Doubles Producciones is an animation and VFX studio founded in 2017 based in Santa Cruz de Tenerife, Canary Islands, Spain. It is jointly owned by Studio 100 International and Viva Pictures. The studio specializes in producing animated feature films and TV series, offering services from development to post-production and is known for producing international co-productions.

== History ==
The company was founded in 2017 by Darío Sánchez and Luis Torres.

In June 2023, it was announced that Los Angeles-based American distributor and production company Viva Pictures via its kids & family division Viva Kids had brought a minoity stake in Spanish animation studio 3Doubles Producciones. The acquisition of a minority stake in 3Doubles had gained Viva Pictures the ability to produce its animated films in-house and expanded 3Doubles' international growth while Viva's SVP of Operations Laura Prieto had joined 3Doubles Producciones as a board member.

Four months later in October of that year, Belgian children's production/distribution group Studio 100 under its German distribution arm Studio 100 Media (now Studio 100 International) had acquired a stake in 3 Doubles Producciones, the acquisition of the stake of 3Doubles Producciones had gained the Studio 100 Group an in-house Spanish animation production studio & their entry into the Spanish entertainment services & gained its own in-house animation unit alongside its Belgian parent Studio 100 with Studio 100 Media will produce feature films & series with 3Doubles Producciones along with Los-Angeles-based film distributor Viva Pictures via its kids & family arm Viva Kids with Studio 100 Media would handle international sales while the latter handling distribution in North America.

== Filmography ==
=== Feature films ===
Title	Release date	Distributor	Notes
The Steam Engines of Oz	June 5, 2018	Cinedigm	co-produced with Arcana Studio
Mia and Me: The Hero of Centopia	May 26, 2022 (Germany); October 27, 2022 (Australia)	Constantin Film; Icon Film Distribution (Australia)	co-production with Studio 100 Media, Studio 100 Film, Flying Bark Productions, Studio Isar Animation, Constantin Film and Studio B Animation
Inspector Sun and the Curse of the Black Widow	2022	Tripictures	co-production with The Thinklab, Kapers Animation, Gordon Box, and Particular Crowd
Giants of La Mancha	1 May 2024 (Germany); 8 August 2024 (Argentina)	Constantin Film; GF Films (Argentina)	co-production with Studio 100 International, Studio Isar Animation, 3Doubles Productions, GF Films, GGVFX and M.A.R.K.13 Film
SuperKlaus	November 29, 2024 (Canada); December 5, 2024 (Spain)	Filmax; PVP Distribution (Canada); Pink Parrot Media (Worldwide sales)	co-production with Capitán Araña, Smartrek A.I.E., and PVP Media
Norbert	January 17, 2025	Buena Vista International	co-production with Capitán Araña
Heidi: Rescue of the Lynx	July 3, 2025; August 22, 2025	Selecta Vision; Leonine Distribution (Germany)	A feature-length film continuation of Studio 100's Heidi by Studio 100 Animation, Jan Van Rijsselberge and Christel Gonnard; Based on the novel Heidi by Johanna Spyri co-production with Studio 100 International, Studio 100 Film, Studio Isar Animation and Hotel Hungaria Animation
Gungo y los juegos cavernícolas	September 3, 2026	Videocine	co-produced with Huevocartoon Entertainment
Arnie & Barney: The Water Quest	September 3, 2026	Port-au-Prince Pictures (Germany)	A spin-off of the Maya the Bee franchise by Waldemar Bonsels co-production with Studio 100 International, Studio 100 Film, Studio Isar Animation and Telegael
Flamingo Flamenco	Q2 2027	Studio 100 Film; Viva Pictures (United States)	co-production with Studio 100 International, Studio 100 Film, Viva Kids, Sumendi Uhartea and Telegael
Dougie Dolittle	2028	TBA	co-production with Studio 100 International, Studio 100 Film, Studio Isar Animation and Caligari Film

=== Short films ===
- Helen (2024)
- Jorge R. Gutierrez "Ages of Madness" short (TBA)
