= Anne Kutka =

Anne Kutka, aka Anne Kutka McCosh ( 1 Oct 1902, Danbury, Connecticut — 1 Mar 1994 ) was a Northwest American artist. She has several works in the Jordan Schnitzer Museum of Art collection including The Challenger, and three in the Portland Art Museum including an untitled oil painting referred to as House on Cliff . Exhibitions of her works have occurred in the Metropolitan Museum of Art, the Seattle Art Museum, and the Art Institute of Chicago.

Anne was one of ten children by John and Susan (Kubicek) Kutka, who had immigrated from what later became Czechoslovakia. She grew up from the age of one in Yonkers, NY. She studied at the Yonkers School of Design and later studied and worked at the Art Students League of New York. Her instructors included Kenneth Hayes Miller and Kimon Nicolaïdes. She married fellow painter David McCosh in 1934 while her sister, Suzanne Kutka, had previously married one of the League's renowned art instructors, Homer Boss.

After their wedding she returned to Chicago so that her husband could take a teaching job there. However, a month later The University of Oregon offered David a job teaching drawing, painting, and lithography. The couple moved to Eugene, Oregon and Anne took the East Coast urban perspective with her. In her works, she tried to focus on the characteristics and features of the people and the events of the college town in which she now resided.

She created more than 650 oils, drawings, watercolors, and prints in her lifetime and is revered as one of the Northwest's best artists. She is also remembered by her former students. In 1991 the University of Oregon sponsored a lifetime retrospective of her work.
