= Heaven Folk =

1915 novel by Waldemar Bonsels

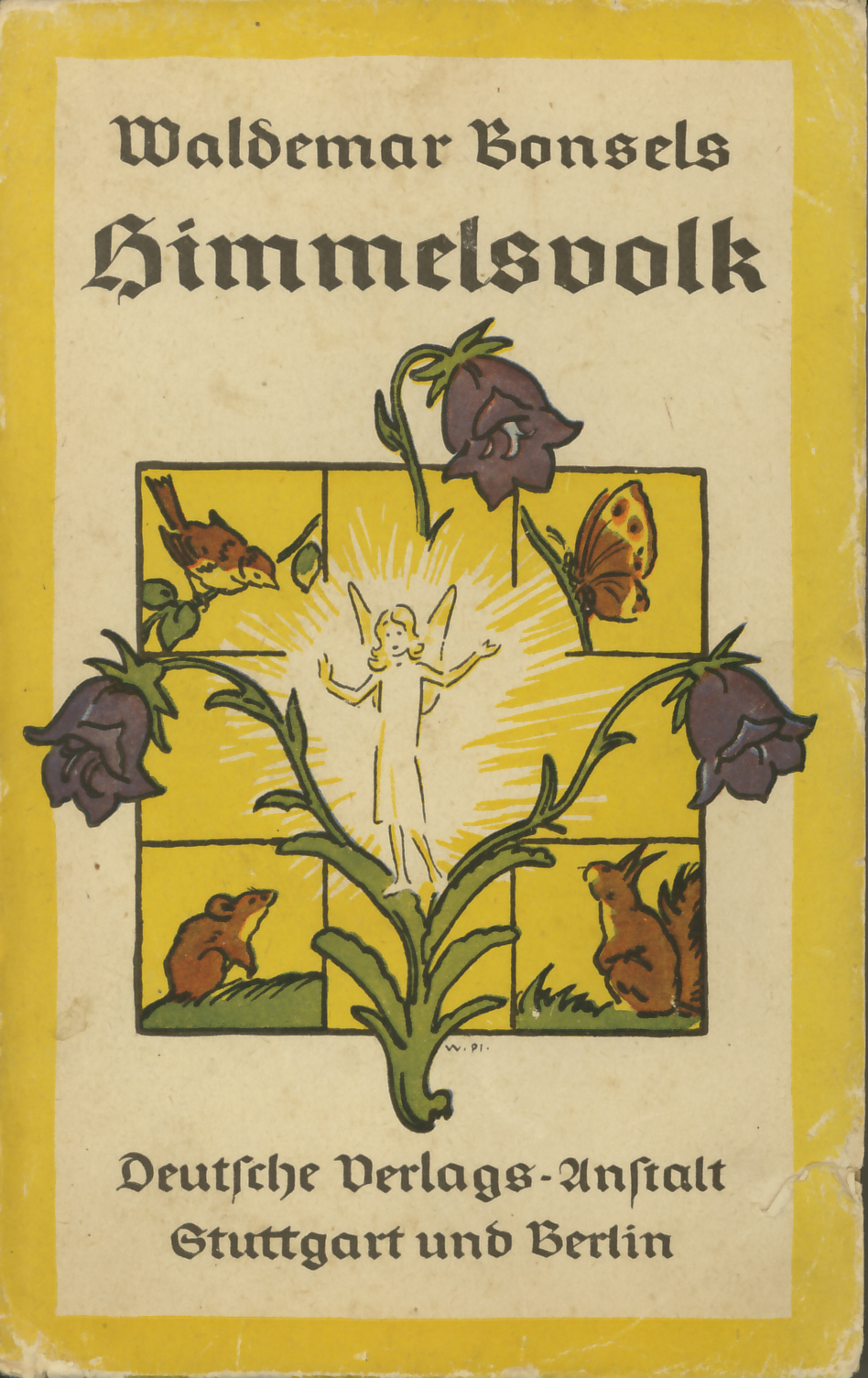
- Cover of a German edition from 1920
- Author: Waldemar Bonsels
- Original title: Himmelsvolk
- Translator: Adele Szold-Seltzer
- Language: German
- Publisher: Schuster & Löffler
- Publication date: 1915
- Publication place: Germany
- English publication date: 1924
- Pages: 215

Heaven Folk (German: Himmelsvolk. Ein Märchen von Blumen, Tieren und Gott, lit. 'Heaven Folk. A Tale of Flowers, Animals and God') is a novel by the German writer Waldemar Bonsels published in 1915. It portrays life in a forest meadow during one year, describing how animals, plants and elves communicate among themselves. It is the sequel to Bonsels' children's book The Adventures of Maya the Bee from 1912 and aimed at slightly older readers.

The English translation by Adele Szold-Seltzer was published in 1924. In Germany, the book was criticised by Christians for incorporating the story of Jesus' love and sacrifice in a story about nature's drama, and portraying it as a goal of natural events. Unlike The Adventures of Maya the Bee, Heaven Folk did not remain popular in Germany in the post-war period.
