= McCosh Grist Mill =

- U.S. National Register of Historic Places
- U.S. Historic district
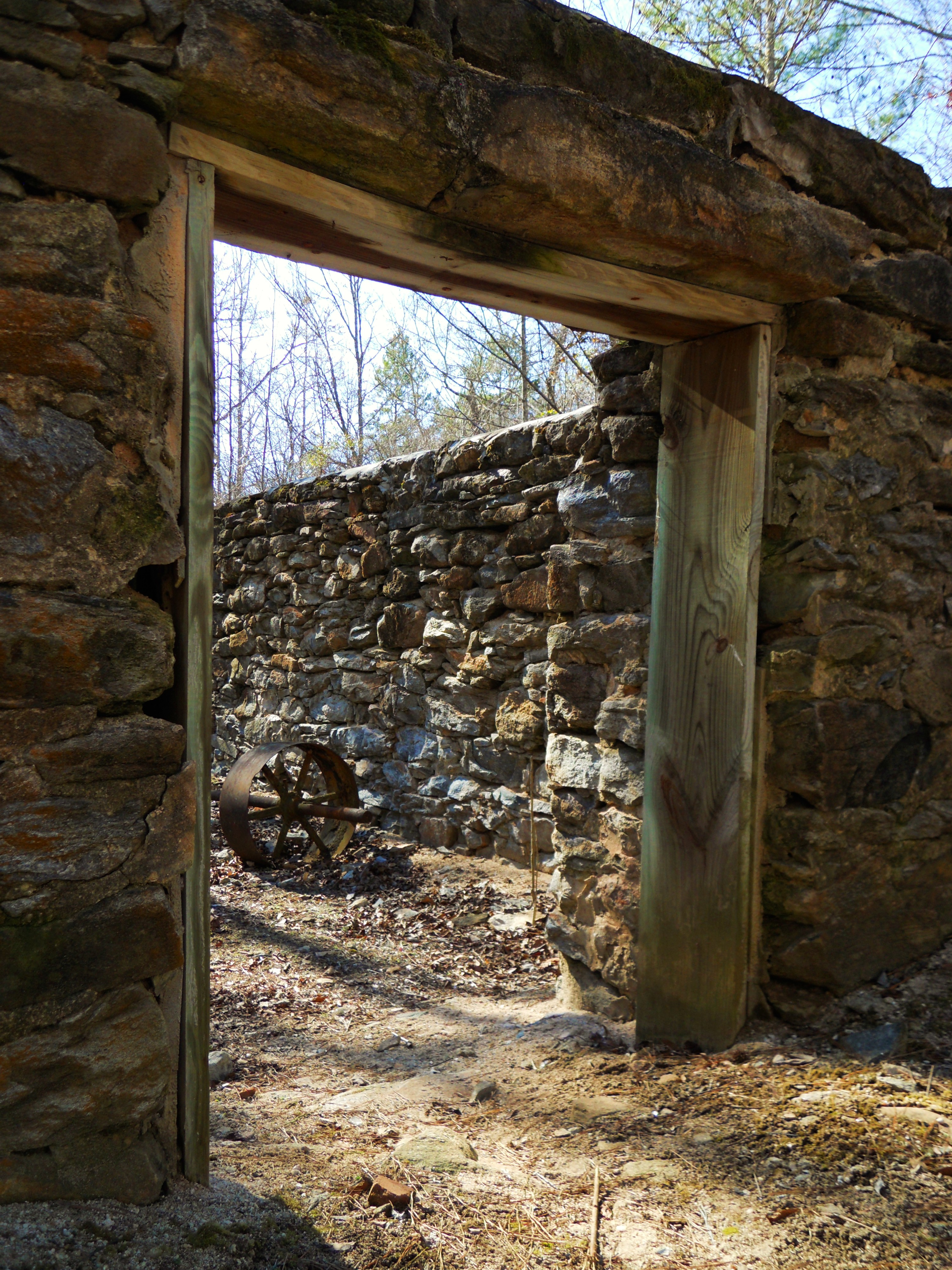
- The mill in February 2011

- Location within Alabama Location within the United States
- Nearest city: Rock Mills, Alabama
- Coordinates: 33°6′29″N 85°14′6″W
- Area: 7 acres (2.8 ha)
- NRHP reference No.: 76000353
- Added to NRHP: November 21, 1976

The McCosh Grist Mill is a historic grist mill near Rock Mills in Randolph County, Alabama. The mill was built in the early 1870s, and is the oldest extant stone grist mill in Alabama. It was built by James Eichelburger McCosh, whose grandfather, Jacob Eichelburger, operated earlier mills that were similar to those in his native Pennsylvania. McCosh also owned 500 acres (200 ha) of farmland nearby, and later added a cotton gin to the site. The mill operated until 1958, and was purchased in 1970 by the United States Army Corps of Engineers as part of the West Point Lake reservoir project.

The mill sits on the sloped bank of Wehadkee Creek, and is 3.5 stories tall on the stream side and 2.5 stories on the bank side. It is constructed of unfinished stones, however features details such as finished stones as quoins, courses of rectangular stones between the doors and cornice, and half millstones as window and door arches. There are two entrances on the main floor, with a large opening above that was probably used to hoist grain to the upper story for storage. The side elevations have two windows per floor, while the rear has four, all with stone sills and wooden lintels. The creek side originally featured a 12-foot wide by 20-foot diameter (3.5 by 6 m) water wheel, which was replaced with three turbines around 1900. The dam which fed the mill race sits about 500 feet (150 m) upstream, is 8 feet high by 125 feet long (2.5 by 38 m), and is also constructed of stone.

The mill was listed on the National Register of Historic Places in 1976.
