= Maya the Honey Bee =

Japanese anime television series

- Japanese DVD cover

みつばちマーヤの冒険 (Mitsubachi Māya no Bōken)
- Genre: Comedy, adventure
- Created by: Waldemar Bonsels
- Anime television series
- Directed by: Masahiro Endō; Hiroshi Saitō
- Produced by: Yoshihiro Ōba
- Written by: Niisan Takahashi
- Music by: Takashi Ogaki
- Studio: Zuiyo Eizo (eps. 1–6); Nippon Animation
- Original network: ANN (ABC, NET)
- English network: AU: Network 10; CA: CBC Family Channel YTV; HK: TVB Pearl ATV World; IE: RTÉ One RTÉ Two; NZ: TV2; US: Nickelodeon; ZA: SABC
- Original run: 1 April 1975 – 20 April 1976
- Episodes: 52
- Anime television series

The New Adventures of Maya the Honey Bee
- Directed by: Mitsuo Kaminashi
- Produced by: Sōjirō Masuko
- Music by: Takashi Ogaki
- Studio: Nippon Animation (Note: Production assistance (制作協力) for all episodes provided by Wako Production.)
- Original network: MegaTON (TVO, TV Tokyo)
- Original run: 1 September 1979 – 13 September 1980
- Episodes: 52

Maya the Honey Bee (Japanese: みつばちマーヤの冒険, Hepburn: Mitsubachi Māya no Bōken; lit. "The Adventures of Maya the Honey Bee"), also titled internationally as Maya the Bee is a Japanese anime television series produced first by Zuiyo Enterprise and Asahi Broadcasting Corporation of Osaka. After the first 6 episodes, Zuiyo Enterprise's animation studio division became Nippon Animation, which retained the rights of the series. The series consisted of 52 episodes and was originally telecast from April 1975 to April 1976 on all ANN affiliates. Loosely based on the classic children's book The Adventures of Maya the Bee by Waldemar Bonsels, the anime series has become extremely popular in continental Europe and has been rebroadcast in countries and languages all around the world since its premiere. A film edited from the first few episodes was released on 15 December 1977.

Two English-dubbed versions of the series exist, a South African version produced by Sonovision for the South African Broadcasting Corporation (SABC), using a translated version of the theme tune used for the German dub, and featuring South African accents for the characters; and an American version with an entirely new theme tune, and a Canadian voice cast, produced by Saban Entertainment, which was broadcast from 1 January 1990 to 31 December 1992 on the children's television channel Nickelodeon. Maya the Bee aired alongside other juvenile-targeted anime such as Adventures of the Little Koala, Noozles and The Littl' Bits as part of Nickelodeon's Nick Jr. block of programming for young children. 65 episodes were dubbed.

A second Maya the Bee series, Shin Mitsubachi Māya no Bōken (新みつばちマーヤの冒険; The New Adventures of Maya the Honey Bee), was a co-production made in 1979 by Nippon Animation, Wako Productions and Austrian/German Apollo Film, Wien. The second series first premiered in Germany (ZDF) from September 1979 to September 1980. Different and cartoon-like second series, which lasted for 52 episodes, was not much popular and did not premiere in Japan until 12 October 1982, on TV Osaka, and aired through 27 September 1983.

Following the show's global success, Studio 100 Media purchased all property rights to the Maya the Bee name from the Waldemar Bonsels Foundation in 2009, excluding publishing. Since then, Studio 100 Animation, a member of the Studio 100 group, produced a CGI series simply titled Maya the Bee in 2012, followed by a film trilogy, which was developed by its film division Studio 100 Film. In 2025, French studio Animaj purchased all rights to the property, including the 1975, 1979 and 2012 Maya the Bee series outside of Germany, Austria, Switzerland and the Benelux, excluding film and theme park rights, which were all retained by Studio 100 International. Nippon Animation currently holds the Japanese rights to the 1975 and 1979 series.

== Story ==
The story centres on Maya, an inquisitive, adventurous and somewhat flighty young honeybee, and her adventures in the forest around her. Maya is born in a bee hive during internal unrest: the hive is dividing itself into two new colonies. Maya is raised by her teacher, Mrs. Cassandra. Despite Mrs. Cassandra's warnings, Maya wants to explore the wide world and commits the unforgivable crime of leaving the hive. During her adventures, Maya, now in exile, befriends other insects and braves dangers with them.

In the last two episodes of the first series, Maya is taken prisoner by hornets, the bees' sworn enemies. Prisoner of the hornets, Maya learns of a hornet plan to attack her native hive. Maya is faced with the decision to either return to hive and suffer her due punishment, saving the hive, or leaving the plan unannounced, saving herself but destroying the hive. As may be expected, Maya, after severe pondering, makes the decision to return. In the hive, she announces the coming attack and is, totally unexpectedly, pardoned. The forewarned bees triumph over the hornet attack force. Maya, now a heroine of the hive, becomes a teacher, like Mrs. Cassandra and shares her experiences and wisdom with the future generation.

== Characters ==
Maya (マーヤ, Māya)
Voiced by: Michiko Nomura (1975), Runa Akiyama (1982) (Japanese); Linda Stewart (South Africa), Pauline Little (Saban) (English); Scarlet Cavadenti (German)
The main character of the story, an inquisitive, adventurous and somewhat flighty young honeybee.
Willy (ウイリー, Uirī)
Voiced by: Masako Nozawa (1975 and 1982 versions) (Japanese); Richard M. Dumont (Saban) (English); Eberhard Storeck (German)
A young drone (male bee) who is Maya's best friend. He is always tired, hungry, skeptical, also somewhat of a coward but generally good-natured. He is prone to jealousy when Maya's attentions turn to others and is often reluctantly dragged into adventures by Maya. He is an original character in the anime.
Flip (フィリップ, Firippu; also "Philip")
Voiced by: Ichirō Nagai (1975), Ritsuo Sawa (1982) (Japanese); A.J. Henderson (Saban) (English); Manfred Lichtenfeld (German)
A wise, top-hatted grasshopper, and a good friend of Maya and Willy.
Miss Cassandra (カッサンドラ先生, Kassandora-sensei)
Voiced by: Miyoko Asō (1975), Reiko Yamada (1982) (Japanese); Jane Woods (Saban) (English); Hannelore Mabry (German)
Maya's teacher and chief authority figure (mostly in the first animated series).

== Staff ==
=== Japanese version ===
- Production: Zuiyo Eizo then Nippon Animation
- Executive producer: Kōichi Motohashi
- Series directors: Hiroshi Saitō, Mitsuo Kaminashi, Seiji Endō
- Script: Hikaru Sasa, Hitoshi Kanazawa
- Screenplay: Fumi Takahashi
- Character designs: Susumu Shiraume
- Animation directors: Susumu Shiraume, Takao Ogawa, Hayao Nobe
- Sound: Yasuhiro Koyama
- Theme songs (performed by Chīta and the Honey Bee Choir, words and music by Seizō Ise):
  - OP – "Mitsubachi Māya no Bōken" (みつばちマーヤの冒険; "The Adventures of Maya the Honey Bee")
  - ED
    1. "Oyasumi Māya" (おやすみマーヤ; "Good Night, Maya")
    2. "Shinju-iro no Warutsu" (真珠色のワルツ; "The Pearl-Colored Waltz") performed by Yōko Maekawa

=== American version ===
- Executive producer: Haim Saban
- Supervising producer: Winston Richard
- Writer: Tim Reid
- Voice direction: Tim Reid, Kathleen Fee
- Associate producer: Eric S. Rollman
- Executive in charge of production: Jerald E. Bergh
- Music by: Haim Saban and Shuki Levy

=== German version ===
- Theme songs
  - "Die Biene Maja" performed by Karel Gott
  - "Die Biene Maja" performed by the James Last Orchestra with female choir vocals
- Music by Karel Svoboda
- Translated and directed by Eberhard Storeck

== Home video ==
Several episodes of Saban's dub were released on VHS by Video Treasures in the United States and HGV Video Productions in Canada under the Saban Video label.
