= David McCosh =

American artist and art instructor

David John McCosh (1903 Cedar Rapids, Iowa – 1981 Eugene, Oregon) was a Northwest American artist and art instructor. The Jordan Schnitzer Museum of Art has over 170 of his works in their permanent collection.

McCosh graduated from the School of Art Institute of Chicago (AIC) in 1926 and began his teaching career there in 1931. In 1934 McCosh traveled to Santa Fe, New Mexico to marry painter Anne Kutka in the company of his new in-laws, artists and art instructors Suzanne Kutka Boss and Homer Boss. Later that same year the couple relocated to Oregon. There he taught courses in lithography, drawing, oil painting and watercolors at the University of Oregon from 1934 through to his retirement in 1970.

List of notable life events
1922	Undergraduate at Coe College, Cedar Rapids, Iowa.
1927	Spends the summer in Wyoming on a painting trip.
1928	Spent 8 months in Europe, including in Paris, France.
1930	Meets Anne Kutka in Oyster Bay, Long Island, with Bolton Brown.
1931	Rooms with Herber Ferber Silvers in New York City in the winter and spends the summer working in Grant Arnold's lithography studio in Woodstock, New York.
1932	Art Institute of Chicago and Stone City Art Colony.
1933	Stone Colony and Murals.
1934	Marries Anne (NM), moves to Eugene, OR; Feragil Gallery, Maynard Walker Gallery.
1936	Sagatuck, Michigan, with Francis Chapin, Art Institute of Chicago Summer School.
1937	Art Institute of Chicago summer school.
1938	Lewis and Clarke in Kelso, WA.
1940	National Parks murals, Washington, D.C.
1942	Spirit of Beresford mural, SD.
1947	Bozeman Montana summer teaching.
1949	Sabbatical: painting at Cohasset Beach, Washington, San Miguel de Allende, Mexico, and New Mexico.
1954	Full Professor
1956	Painting workshop in Klamath Falls, Oregon.
1957	Guest artist at San Jose State College, California, during the summer.
1958	Sabbatical: England, France, Italy, Morocco, and Spain.
1962	Illustrates Ernest G. Moll's poem “The Lightless Ferry” for publication in The Rainbow Serpent and Other Poems.
1965	Sabbatical: New Mexico and in San Miguel de Allende, Mexico City, and the Yucatán.
1970	Retires.
1977	Interview with David and Anne.
1981	Dies in Eugene, Oregon.

Following his death in 1981, his widow Anne Kutka McCosh donated over a thousand of his works and other art-related materials to the University of Oregon and the University's Art Museum. Included were personal letters, sketch books, and audio interviews with other artists. There was also a 1977 interview of the couple themselves. Some of this material was turned into an essay, The Making of David McCosh. Other essays about McCosh include The Night Drawings of David McCosh, Learning to Paint is Learning to See and David McCosh / Entanglements.
