= Lucinda Davis =

African-American woman formerly enslaved by a Muscogee man

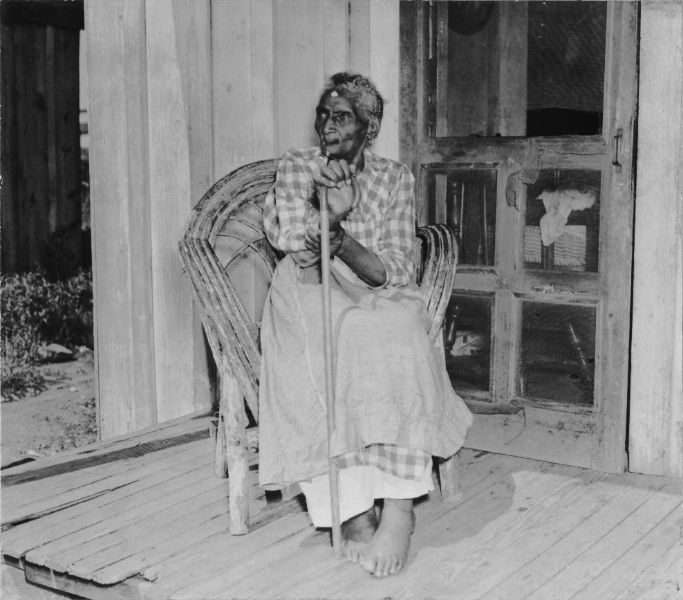
- Born: circa 1848; Indian Territory
- Died: after 1937
- Spouse: Anderson Davis

Lucinda Davis (c. 1848 – after 1937) was an African-American woman enslaved and raised by a Muscogee man in Indian Territory (present-day Oklahoma). She witnessed the Battle of Honey Springs near her house. She was freed with the Emancipation Proclamation and later reunited with her parents. In 1937, when she was estimated to be 89 years old, the Oklahoma Writers' Project interviewed her; the slave narrative produced then is the main source on her life. She discussed in detail the Muscogee customs she experienced as a child.

== Early life ==
Davis' parents were Stephany, enslaved perhaps by a man named George of the Grayson family, and Serena, enslaved by someone from the Gouge family. They lived together despite belonging to different masters, which was regular for slaves of the Muscogee according to Davis. Slaves gave most of their produce to their owners but could keep a little of it; "[d]ey didn't have to stay on de master's place and work like I hear de slaves of de white people and de Cherokee and Choctaw people say dey had to do." Nevertheless, the Muscogee had a complicated relationship with their black slaves and free black neighbours. When Davis was still a small child, her parents either ran away or bought their freedom and her mother's former owner sold her to a man known as Tuskaya-hiniha (which means "head man warrior"). She never learnt when or where she was born and she only met her parents after the Civil War.

== Life enslaved by Tuskaya-hiniha ==
Davis did not remember a time before living with Tuskaya-hiniha's family. He owned a "purty good size" farm about 2 miles (3 km) north of the Elk River and 25 miles (40 km) south of Fort Gibson in the east of present-day Oklahoma. He sold the corn he grew at the wagon depot of Honey Springs to travelling traders. His wife, Nancy Lott, was white or "purty near white" and spoke English, but she did so rarely because no one else around her did. Davis herself spoke Muscogee as her first language and learnt English as an adult. The family also included the couple's widowed daughter Luwina, her baby son, and her young sister-in-law Nancy Walker.

Tuskaya-hiniha bought Davis to care for Luwina's son, known as Istidji, "little man", as he was too young to be given a name. Davis recalled that Tuskaya-hiniha had "'bout as many slaves as [she] got fingers", but she did not remember their names. All slaves were called istilusti, "black man". Shortly before the American Civil War, Tuskaya-hiniha became blind, which enabled many of his slaves to run away. Davis sometimes led him around the garden in front of the house.

=== Muscogee customs recounted by Davis ===
==== Housing and food ====
Tuskaya-hiniha lived in a log house with a gallery-like brush shelter in front which had a dirt floor, similar to other Muscogee houses. Food was cooked in the yard in large pots and eaten there. Davis recalled the food fondly, such as ash cake made of corn and sofki, a pot of which was always in the house for people to eat if they felt hungry. Sofki, a type of grits, was made of finely pounded corn, which was subsequently washed, soaked, and boiled. All guests had to eat of it to avoid offending the host.

===== Dances and celebrations =====
Davis recalled that when the green corn ripened "enough to eat", probably in July, a busk would be held. If things were going well for the community, the busk was a great feast with many bangas danced, such as the tolosabanga, "chicken dance" or the istifanibanga where people pretended to be skeletons and "raw heads" chasing others. In the hadjobanga or "crazy dance", people made up "funny songs" and laughed while dancing. However, the "drunk dance" was one that "good people" never participated in: "dey jest dance ever whichaway, de men and de women together, and dey wrassle and hug and carry on awful", singing out going to each other's houses to sleep together. They shouted things like, "We is all drunk and we don't know what we doing and we ain't doing wrong 'cause we is all drunk". Some "bad ones" then went off to the woods (presumably for illicit sexual affairs). This angered the community and sometimes even lead to killings. There were rumours that if a man caught his wife or daughter in the woods, he beat her and cut off the rim of her ears. Davis believed this happened because she once saw that a woman's ear was mutilated in this way when she brushed her hair.

=== During the Civil War ===
The Battle of Honey Springs occurred near Davis' home in the summer of 1864. One morning before sunrise, Davis was pushing Istidji on a swing when a horserider arrived over the hills, shouting a battle cry to warn people. Tuskaya-hiniha ordered his family to load the necessities into a wagon and flee. Eventually, they were stuck in mud because of the rain and saw Confederate soldiers pass by. They then hid in a cave and listened to the ongoing battle all night, then saw the Confederade soldiers retreating towards Honey Springs. The Union Army burnt down the wagon depot and houses there. The next day the family returned home, finding everything in order. Davis believed that the soldiers had no time to pillage.

As the war kept going, the family moved to be away from danger as did many of their neighbours. Travelling towards Texas in a great crowd of wagons, Davis recalled that the free men would eat all food at night because of their exhaustion and leave little for the women and enslaved people. After crossing the Canadian River, they lived in the houses left behind by people who had fled fighting. They were careful not to cross paths with ex-soldiers who were pillaging the empty buildings, as they would have killed anyone who disturbed them. Sometimes, they found fresh graves and once there were dead people inside a house.

== Life after the Civil War ==
Eventually, they lived for about two years in a "little cabin". They grew corn, caught fish, and a man called Mr Walker shot hogs for meat. By this time, all slaves of Tuskaya-hiniha had run away except for Davis. She was not aware of when the war ended and when she became free with the Emancipation Proclamation; she stayed with her former master as she was "jest a little girl" and had nowhere else to go.

After two years, three English-speakng men arrived to reunite Davis with her parents (as many formerly enslaved people were at the time). They took her to the Creek Agency. She lived with her parents in Verdigris until her adulthood and their deaths. Afterwards, she married Anderson Davis and the pair received some land near Broken Arrow.

She had "lots of children", but only two were alive at the time of the interview. Her son Anderson spent some time in prison after he "got in a mess" but was let out for his good behaviour. He had married a "good woman" who had "lots of property" and was "living all right" in 1937.

At the time of the interview, she had lived with a woman named Josephine since her husband's death whose identity is unclear. She had become blind and was bothered by the noise of the town. She complained that children were "ill mannered" compared to her own, who had been raised the "old Creek way": "I could jest set in de corner and tell 'em what to do, and iffen they didn't do it right I could whack 'em on de head", because they knew their elders knew better.

It is not known when or where Davis died.

== See also ==
- Slave narrative
- African American literature
