= HGV Video Productions =

Canadian home video distributor (1989–2002)

HGV Video Productions Inc.
- Industry: Home video
- Founded: May 1989
- Defunct: July 31, 2002
- Fate: Folded into Anchor Bay Entertainment
- Headquarters: Ajax, Ontario, Canada
- Parent: GoodTimes Entertainment (50%; 1989-2000); Handleman Company

HGV Video Productions Inc. was a Canadian home video company that was originally formed in May 1989, to distribute releases from Video Treasures, Burbank Video and GoodTimes Entertainment, among other companies in Canada. Its headquarters were located in Ajax, Ontario. On August 1, 2002, HGV was renamed to Anchor Bay Entertainment Canada Ltd.
