= Waldemar Bonsels =

German writer

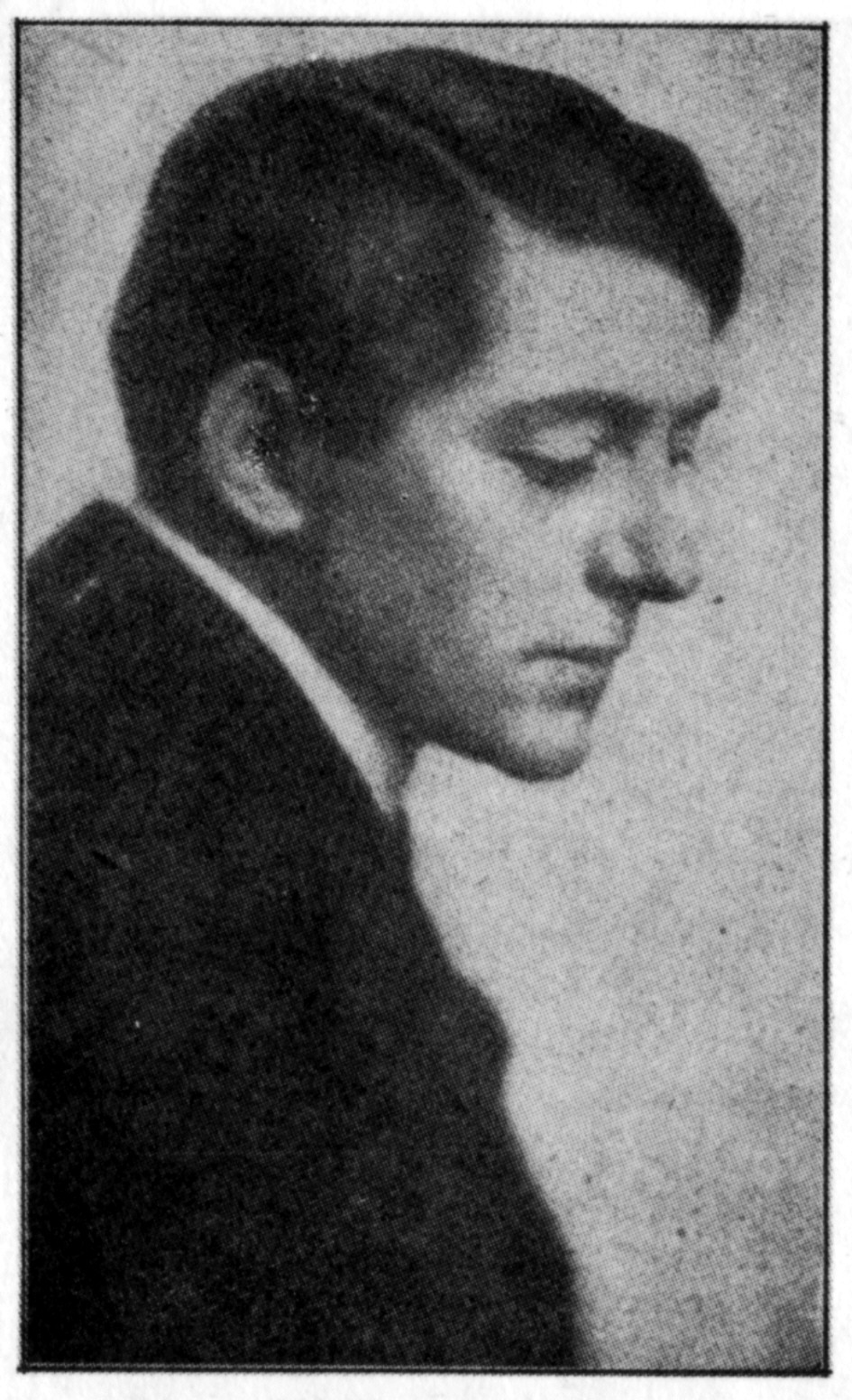
- Waldemar Bonsels in 1923
- Born: 21 February 1880; Ahrensburg; German Empire
- Died: 31 July 1952 (aged 72); Ambach, Münsing; West Germany
- Occupation: Writer
- Years active: 1912–1952

Waldemar Bonsels (21 February 1880 – 31 July 1952) was a German writer and creator of Maya the Bee.

== Life and work ==
Waldemar Bonsels was born in Ahrensburg on 21 February 1880.

Bonsels's most famous work is the children's book The Adventures of Maya the Bee (Die Biene Maja und ihre Abenteuer) from 1912. This work served the basis for a Japanese animated television series Maya the Honey Bee in the mid-1970s, as well as well as multiple other works for screen or stage. Heaven Folk from 1915 is a sequel with a more philosophical focus, describing in mystical terms the unity of all creation and its relationship to God.

Bonsels wrote a number of novels and shorter stories dealing with love as Eros and the higher level of divine love in the spirit of romanticism (Eros und die Evangelien, Menschenwege, Narren und Helden, etc.), and about the relationship between man and nature in a simple life unchanged by modern civilisation (Anjekind, etc.). Bonsels also wrote a historical novel about the time of Jesus (Der Grieche Dositos).

He travelled extensively in Europe and Asia, which resulted in the book Indienfahrt (Voyage in India).

Bonsels was an outspoken antisemite and expressed his approval of Nazi politics against Jews in 1933, calling the Jew "a deadly enemy" who was "poisoning the culture" in an article (NSDAP und Judentum) which was widely published. He died in Ambach, Münsing.

== Bibliography ==
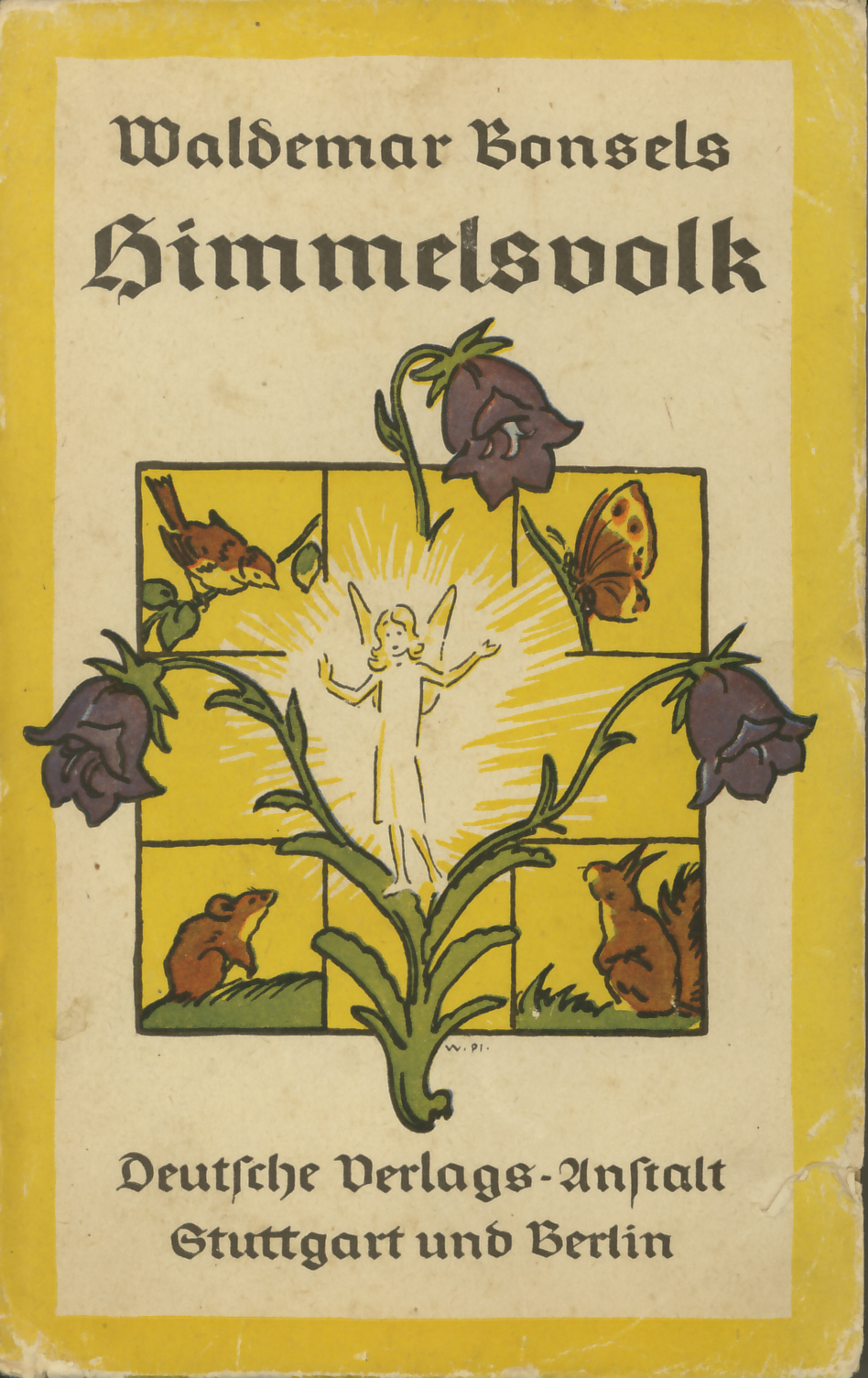
Heaven Folk (Himmelsvolk)

=== Books ===
- Die Biene Maja und ihre Abenteuer (1912) (translated as The Adventures of Maya the Bee)
- Himmelsvolk. Ein Buch von Blumen, Tieren und Gott (1915) (translated as Heaven Folk)
- Indienfahrt (1916) (translated as An Indian Journey)
- Menschenwege: Aus den Notizen eines Vagabunden (1917)
- Das Unjekind: Eine Erzählung (101.-120. edition, 1922)
- Eros und die Evangelien: Aus den Notizen eines Vagabunden (67.-90. thousand, 1922)
- Wartalun: eine Schlossgeschichte (101.-114. edition, 1922)
- Weihnachtsspiel: eine Dichtung (1922)
- Jugendnovellen (1923)
- Narren und Helden: Aus den Notizen eines Vagabunden (24.-26. thousand, 1924)
- Mario und die Tiere (1928) (translated as The Adventures of Mario)
- Dositos: Ein mythischer Bericht aus der Zweitwende (1949)
- Der Reiter in der Wüste: Eine Amerikafahrt (1935)
- Mario Ein Leben im Walde (1939) (Mario A Life in the Woods)
- Efeu: Erzählungen und Begegnungen (1953)

Translations

- Bonsels, Waldemar (1929). The Adventures of Maya the Bee. Illustrated by Vera Bock; translated by Adele Szold Seltzer and Arthur Guiterman. New York: A. & C. Boni.
- Bonsels, Waldemar (1930). The Adventures of Mario. Translated by Whittaker Chambers. New York: A. & C. Boni.

=== Short stories ===
- Die Winde
- Angelika
- Scholander
- Die Stadt am Strom
- Asja

=== Essays ===
- NSDAP und Judentum (1933)
