= Frayed =

Frayed may refer to:

- Frayed (novella), an original novella based on British science fiction television series Doctor Who
- Frayed (TV series), a 2019 comedy series for the ABC in Australia and Sky UK in Great Britain

== See also ==
- Frayed Knights, a 2011 3D indie computer RPG for Windows
