= Bloody Hell (disambiguation) =

Bloody Hell is an expletive; see Bloody. Bloody Hell may also refer to:

- Bloody Hell (2020 film), Australian horror comedy film
- Bloody Hell (2023 film), Canadian coming-of-age comedy drama film
