= Fairy Tale Police Department =

German animated television series

- DVD cover
- Genre: Adventure; Fantasy; Cartoon series
- Created by: Ron Isaak; Leora Kamenetzky
- Directed by: David Evans; Karl Zwicky
- Voices of: Sarah Aubrey; Maggie Dence; Drew Forsythe; Nick Jasprizza; Rachel King; Keith Scott
- Theme music composer: Clive Harrison
- Opening theme: "Fairy Tale Police Department"
- Ending theme: "Fairy Tale Police Department" (Instrumental)
- Composer: Clive Harrison
- Countries of origin: Germany; Australia
- Original languages: German; English
- No. of seasons: 1
- No. of episodes: 26

Production
- Executive producers: Ron Isaak; Thorsten Wegener (for Victory)
- Producers: Rodney Whitham; Christian Heuermann (for Victory); Leora Kamenetzky, Liran Talit, and Yehuda Talit (for Talit)
- Editors: Roger Grant; Strutts Psyridis
- Running time: 24 minutes
- Production companies: Talit Communications (Israel); Victory Media Group; EM.TV & Merchandising AG; Yoram Gross-EM.TV

Original release
- Network: Seven Network (Australia); ZDF (Germany)
- Release: 10 September 2001 – 2 December 2002

Fairy Tale Police Department is an animated series, produced by the company Yoram Gross-EM.TV in co-production with EM.TV & Merchandising AG, Victory Media Group, and Talit Communications. It aired on Seven Network at various times. It offers a new perspective on classic fairy tales through the central characters Johnny Legend and Christine Anderson. They are magic police officers who restore balance to society.

== Setting ==
The series takes place in Fairy Tale Land, when a fairy tale is messed up, the cops, Johnny Legend and Christine Anderson come to fix it.

== Characters ==
- Johnny Legend - Christine's childish, cowardly and clumsy partner who is easily distracted from work; he prefers to style his hair with a comb that he always carries around in his pocket than solve a crime. Johnny's clumsiness and inability to focus properly mostly gets the pair in trouble which is something that he is not often aware of. Although he acts cowardly, he can be serious at times but only in the most extreme of circumstances (or if he wants to). Voiced by Nick Jasprizza.
- Christine (Chris) Anderson - a smart, hard-working and patient lady cop and one of two main characters of the show. Christine is the most level-headed and intelligent of the two and takes her job seriously as a cop. She always wants to get the job done right and hates it when an interference or distraction occurs (mostly caused by Johnny's clumsiness and awkwardness). She is partners with Johnny, although she dislikes his behaviour she does see him as good cop and friend. She also often gets transformed into animals by Wanda and other fairy tale characters. She often wears and dark blue jacket with purple pants and has dark orange hair. Her name is similar to Hans Christian Andersen, a Danish author who wrote fairy tales. Voiced by Sarah Aubrey.
- Wanda - a clumsy fairy who struggles with magic, which can be troublesome at times. Wanda is also somewhat careless and distracted like Johnny and takes a while to get her spells right. Wanda's magic words are usually "Wanda Winkle" and was one of the good fairy godmothers from the Sleeping Beauty story, specifically the one who averted the bad fairy's curse. Wanda is friends with almost every other fairy, witch or magician in Fairy Tale Land, such as Agatha (Cinderella's fairy godmother), the Sorcerer from "The Sorcerer's Apprentice", and the Witches from "Rapunzel" and "Beauty & the Beast". She is also sworn enemies with Nancy the wicked fairy, also from Sleeping Beauty. Voiced by Sarah Aubrey.
- Chief Horace White - the grumpy, overbearing and no-nonsense chief of F.T.P.D. Station. He is easily annoyed and Johnny's childish awkwardness and carelessness often puts him on the edge of the chief's temper. Voiced by Drew Forsythe.
- Claude - a scientist frog who says he's really a prince, is intelligent enough, but his ideas and inventions are sometimes useless and ridiculous. Voiced by Nick Jasprizza.
- Pinocchio - a fairy tale character who works at F.T.P.D. Like the original Pinocchio, his nose grows longer if he tells a lie. Voiced by Maggie Dence.

== Episode list ==
1. Pinocchio: Puppet in Peril (Pinocchio) (10 September 2001)
2. The Frog Prince Riddle (The Frog Prince) (17 September 2001)
3. Black Day for Snow White (Snow White and the Seven Dwarfs) (24 September 2001)
4. No Kiss for Sleeping Beauty (Sleeping Beauty) (1 October 2001)
5. Little Pigs' House of Trouble (The Three Little Pigs) (8 October 2001)
6. The Emperor's New Clues (The Emperor's New Clothes) (15 October 2001)
7. Big Trouble for the Little Tailor (The Brave Little Tailor) (22 October 2001)
8. The Good, The Bad, and the Ugly Duckling (The Ugly Duckling) (29 October 2001)
9. The Beauty & The Beast Bungle (Beauty and the Beast) (5 November 2001)
10. Rumpelstiltskin's Last Straw (Rumpelstiltskin) (12 November 2001)
11. The Glass Slipper Caper (Cinderella) (19 November 2001)
12. The Trials of The Tin Soldier (The Steadfast Tin Soldier) (26 November 2001)
13. Musicians of Bremen Mystery (Town Musicians of Bremen) (3 December 2001)
14. No Pea for A Princess (The Princess and the Pea) (9 September 2002)
15. Who'll Help Hansel & Gretel (Hansel and Gretel) (16 September 2002)
16. The Sorcerer's Apprentice Spells Trouble (The Sorcerer's Apprentice) (23 September 2002)
17. The Hair-Raising Rapunzel Case (Rapunzel) (30 September 2002)
18. The Big Beanstalk Break-In (Jack and the Beanstalk) (7 October 2002)
19. The Pied Piper Puzzle (The Pied Piper) (14 October 2002)
20. Trouble Afoot for Puss in Boots (Puss in Boots) (21 October 2002)
21. Aladdin and the Lost Lamp (Aladdin) (28 October 2002)
22. Wrong Way For Little Red Riding Hood (Little Red Riding Hood) (4 November 2002)
23. Ali Baba and The Faulty Thieves (Ali Baba and the Forty Thieves) (11 November 2002)
24. The Curious Kidnapping of Thumbelina (Thumbelina) (18 November 2002)
25. The Fishy Tale of The Little Mermaid (The Little Mermaid) (25 November 2002)
26. A Fairy Tale Ending (2 December 2002)

== Reception ==
A 2006 review for the video release in The Daily Times called the animation "unimaginative and cheap-looking", and complained that the show focused too much on the detectives, in addition to its jokes.
