= Josh McConville =

Australian actor

- Born: 27 January 1986 (age 40)
- Occupation: Actor
- Years active: 2008–present

Josh McConville (born 27 January 1986) is an Australian actor who has played in theatre, film and television. He was nominated for the 2018 AACTA Award for Best Actor in a Supporting Role for his role in 1%.

In 2024, McConville joined the filming for feature film The Correspondent. McConville also joined filming for ABC series Plum.

== Filmography ==
=== Film appearances ===
Year	Title	Role	Notes
2026	The Get Out	Slosser	
2026	Thrash	Bob	Film
2025	Fear Below	Janusz Wojcik	Film
2024	The Correspondent	Karel	Film
2022	Learning the Curvature of the Earth	Jordan	Short
2022	Elvis	Sam Phillips	
2021	Lone Wolf	Conrad	
2020	The Bus to Birra Birra	Tom	Short
2020	Among Men	Chris	Short
2020	Fantasy Island	Sarge	
2019	Measure for Measure	Ice Man	
2019	Standing Up For Sonny	Heckler	
2019	Escape and Evasion	Seth	
2019	Top End Wedding	Officer Kent	
2018	The Hold Up	Alfo	Short
2018	The Merger	Snapper	
2017	Outlaws	Skink	
2017	War Machine	Payne	
2017	Fidget and Foil	Voice	Video
2016	Joe Cinque's Consolation	Chris	
2016	Down Under	Gav	
2016	Oranges Don't Grow On Trees	Shmith	Short
2015	Kid	Brick	Short
2014	You Cut, I Choose	Jack (27 & 37)	Short
2014	Blood Pulls a Gun	Blood Liebermann	
2014	The Infinite Man	Dan	
2013	The Turning	Vic Lang	Segment: "Commission"
2012	Sam's Gold		Short
2011	The Best Man	Duncan	Short
2010	Herman and Majorie	Herman	Short
2009	Lonely	Lonely	Short
2009	Thanks for Coming	Mitchell	Short

=== TV appearances ===
Year	Title	Role	Notes
2026	Ground Up	Alistair Penfold	TV series
2025	Black Snow	Will Jacobs	6 episodes
2025	Optics	Stevo	1 episode
2024	Plum	Squeaky	4 episodes
2017-2024	Home and Away	Wes / Caleb Snow	10 episodes
2023	NCIS: Sydney	Amen Standish	1 episode
2023	In Limbo	Johan	2 episodes
2023	No Escape	DS Paul Christie	6 episodes
2022	Significant Others	Officer Bedford	1 episode
2022	Lessons for LiveStream	James	1 episode
2021	Discover Indie Film	Tom	1 episode
2021	Wakefield	Scott	1 episode
2019	Mr Inbetween	Alex	4 episodes
2016	Cleverman	Dickson	3 episodes
2014	The Killing Field	Jackson	TV movie
2012	Redfern Now	Photographer	1 episode
2011	Wild Boys	Ben	1 episode
2009	Underbelly: A Tale of Two Cities	Michael Hurley	3 episodes
