= Emma Harvie =

Australian actress

- Born: Sydney, Australia
- Occupation: Actress
- Years active: 2003–present

Emma Harvie is an Australian actress. She is best known for playing Chaya Batra on Seven Network's RFDS and Megan in Colin from Accounts.

== Early life ==
Harvie was born in Sydney. She is a graduate of ACAs Full Time Course. Harvie is of Sri Lankan descent. She has wanted to become an actress since she was in primary school.

== Career ==
Harvie's first recurring role was Emily in the British-Australian comedy series Frayed. Her first big role came when she played Chaya Batra in the drama series RFDS. Her most famous role so far has been as Megan in Colin from Accounts. She received the Casting Guild of Australia Rising Star award which has previously been won by Milly Alcock, Olivia DeJonge and Katherine Langford. She currently appears in Ground Up on ABC and ABC iview.

In a 2018 interview, she stated that she didn't have a dream role, but thought that Liam Neesons's character Bryan Mills in Taken would be fun.

== Filmography ==
=== Film ===
Year	Title	Role	Notes
2017	Ladylike	Maya	Short
2018	Toe-Sucker	Charlie	Short
2019	This Time, Maybe	Esther	
2020	Incovenience Store	Ruby	Short
2021	Revolt	Effie	Short
2021	Science+	Anril	Web Series
2021	Privileged	Gemma	
2023	Come with Me	Woman	Short
2025	Luna and the Brain Tuna		Short

=== Television ===
Year	Title	Role	Notes
2015	Home and Away	Nurse Julie	Episode: Episode #1.6327
2019	The Letdown	Anoush	2 episodes
2019	Diary of an Uber Driver	Nina	Episode: Episode #1.2
2021	Frayed	Emily	5 episodes
2023	In Limbo	Freya	6 episodes
2023	RFDS	Chaya Batra	8 episodes
2022–2026	Colin from Accounts	Megan	20 episodes
2026	Ground Up	Destiny	6 episodes

=== Theatre ===
Year	Title	Role	Notes
2022	The Jungle and the Sea	Lakshmi	
2022	44 Sex Acts In One Week	Celina	
2022	Counting and Cracking	Young Dhamayanthi, Swathi and others	UK tour
2024	No Pay? No Way!	Margherita	
2026	The Jungle and the Sea	Lakshmi	
