= Drop Dead Weird =

Australian-Irish television series

- Genre: Children / teen drama; comedy drama; Fantasy
- Created by: Sally Browning; Dean Cropp
- Written by: Stephen Abbott; Warren Coleman; Tadhg Mac Dhonnagain
- Directed by: Danny Raco; Beth Armstrong; Glenn Fraser
- Starring: Sofia Nolan; Jack Riley; Adele Cosentino; Amanda Bishop; David Collins
- Composer: Andy O’Callaghan
- Countries of origin: Australia; Ireland
- Original language: English
- No. of series: 2
- No. of episodes: 52

Production
- Camera setup: Two camera
- Running time: 26 minutes

Original release
- Network: 7TWO (2017); RTE2 (2017)
- Release: 6 November 2017 – 12 August 2019

Drop Dead Weird is an Australian-Irish children's comedy drama television series screening on the Seven Network's digital channel 7TWO from 6 November 2017. This Australian/Irish co-production was created by Sally Browning and Dean Cropp. It was written by Stephen Abbott, Warren Coleman and Tadhg Mac Dhonnagain and directed by Beth Armstrong, Danny Raco and Glenn Fraser. The series was also broadcast on CITV in the United Kingdom from June 2019.

== Synopsis ==
The Champs are an Australian family who move to Tubbershandy, an isolated seaside village in western Ireland to save the Bed & Breakfast run by their Irish grandfather. The three Aussie children Lulu, Bruce and Frankie are finding it hard to fit into a new hometown but also hide the secret that their parents recently became zombies. The kids must keep the truth under wraps from the community and in particular, local identity Bernadette (Bunni) Shanahan.

== Cast ==
- Sofia Nolan as Lulu
- Jack Riley as Bruce
- Adele Cosentino as Frankie
- Amanda Bishop as Mum
- David Collins as Dad
- Maeliosa Stafford as Grandad
- Pauline McLynn as Bunni
- Lucy Maher as Aisling
- David Rawle as Dermot
- Connor Burke as Connor
- Annie Byron as Maryanne
- Jon Sivewright as Uncle Peter

== Series overview ==
Series	Episodes	Originally released	
Series	Episodes	First released	Last released
1	26	6 November 2017	11 December 2017
2	26	8 July 2019	12 August 2019
