= Sarah Aubrey =

British-born Australian actress

- Born: United Kingdom
- Occupation: Actress
- Years active: 1998–present

Sarah Aubrey is a British-born Australian actress. She has had guest roles in episodes of Pieces of Her, The Secret Life of Us, All Saints, Water Rats and Frayed, along with numerous animation series and TV commercials. She also won the Best Actress award at the 2002 Tropfest film festival and is one of Australia's top voice talents.

== Education ==
Aubrey has trained extensively in theatre, television and film. She started at the University of Newcastle where she played the lead in the 1993 production of Agnes of God alongside professional actresses, Julie Kirby and Peggy Thompson, directed by Australian theatre director, David Logan. She went on to further her training at the National Institute of Dramatic Art in Sydney and the British American Drama Academy in Oxford.

== Career ==
=== Acting ===
Aubrey appeared in the Australian television soap, Home and Away, in 1998 playing Tamara Duncan, in 2000 playing Gilly Austen and again in 2007 playing Judy Holly. In 2000 she also appeared in Above the Law, playing Mary Stafford, in Murder Call, playing Amy Simms. and in All Saints, playing Amanda Morton. In 2001 she appeared in Water Rats, playing Madeleine Fyfe.

Aubrey won best actress at the Tropfest film festival in 2002 for the short film Boomerang and was in the Silverchair video "Ana's Song", which was voted one of the top ten best videos on MTV in the United States in 1999.

In 2005 she appeared in an episode of The Secret Life of Us, playing Camel Toe. She subsequently provided the voices for characters in Dive Olly Dive and Master Raindrop.

=== Music ===
In 2006 Aubrey formed a band with Scott Andrew (guitar, vocals), Christopher Campbell (bass, guitar, backing vocals) and Rebecca Clarke (drums, percussion). For two years they performed under the name 'Sarah Aubrey' but renamed the band 'Girl Most Likely'. Their songs have been used on television promotions for The L Word, All Saints and Home and Away. In February 2009 they released a self-titled debut EP.

== Filmography ==
=== Film ===
Year	Title	Role	Type
2002	Sway		
2002	Boomerang		Short film Won Best Actress at 2002 Tropfest Film Festival
2011	Happy Feet Two	Additional voices	Animated film
2017	Whispers Among Wolves	Shiloh Dashwood	Short film

=== Television ===
Year	Title	Role	Notes	Ref
1998, 2000, 2007, 2009	Home and Away	Tamara Duncan / Gilly Austen / Judy Holly	TV series	
2000	Marriage Acts		TV series	
2000	Above the Law	Mary Stafford	TV series	
2000	All Saints	Amanda Morton	TV series	
2000	Murder Call	Amy Simms	TV series	
2001	Water Rats	Madeleine Fyfe	TV series	
2001	Fairy Tale Police Department		Animated TV series	
2004	Blinky Bill's Extraordinary Balloon Adventure	Ling Ling, Tico Toucan, Ma Dingo, Daisy Dingo, various one or two time characters	TV series	
2005	The Secret Life of Us	Camel Toe	TV series, 1 episode	
2003, 2004	Seaside Hotel		Animated TV series	
2006, 2009	Dive Olly Dive!	Voices	Animated TV series	
2006	Deadly!	Amy, Sprocket, Reptile/Hilda	Animated TV series	
2008	Staines Down Drains		Animated TV series	
2008	Master Raindrop	Shao Yen (and other voices	Animated TV series	
2010	Sally Bollywood: Super Detective	Sally	Animated TV series	
2010	Rescue: Special Ops	Silva (performing with her band Girl Most Likely)	TV series	
2018, 2022, 2025–present	Nate Is Late	Malika / Principal Prudence	Animated TV series	
2019	Frayed	Mrs Porter	TV series	
2021	Tales of Aluna	Aluna	Animated TV series	
2022	Pieces of Her	Annette Queller	Netflix TV series	
2023	Wellmania	Paramedic #1	1 episode	
2023	Year Of	Jacqui	1 episode	
2023	The PM's Daughter	Linda	TV series	
2024	Four Years Later	Technician	1 episode	

== Discography ==
- Girl Most Likely – Independent/Waterfront (GML001) (10 February 2009)
