= Sofia Nolan =

Australian actress

- Born: 26 June 1999 (age 26); Newcastle, New South Wales, Australia
- Occupation: Actress
- Years active: 2017–present

Sofia Nolan is an Australian actress. She is best known for playing Lulu in Drop Dead Weird and Taylor Emerson in RFDS.

== Early life ==
Nolan was born in Newcastle, New South Wales.

== Career ==
Nolan made her first tv appearance in 2017 on the comedy series Kiki and Kitty. Her first lead role came when she played Lulu in the Irish-Australian comedy drama series Drop Dead Weird. She was then cast as Heather in the popular Australian soap opera Home and Away. She revealed she never watched a full episode prior to joining. Another popular role that Nolan is known for is as Taylor Emerson in RFDS. Her most recent role was a guest appearance in the drama series Last Days of the Space Age.

== Filmography ==
=== Film ===
Year	Title	Role	Notes
2018	Rosamine		Short film
2020	Mukbang	Chloe	Short film

=== Television ===
Year	Title	Role	Notes
2017	Kiki and Kitty	Annabelle	2 episodes
2017–2019	Drop Dead Weird	Lulu	Main role
2021	Preppers	Paisley	Episode: "Shangri-La 2"
2022	Home and Away	Heather Fraser	17 episodes
2021–present	RFDS	Taylor Emerson	Main role
2023	The Artful Dodger	Milly Wince	Episode: "The Yankee Dodge"
2024	Last Days of the Space Age	Tam	2 episodes
