= Alexandra Jensen =

Australian actress

- Born: 1999 or 2000 (age 26–27); Toronto, New South Wales, Australia
- Occupations: Actress, model, writer, singer
- Years active: 2019–present
- Known for: Jade in Talk to Me (2022)

Alexandra Jensen (born 1999 or 2000) is an Australian actress. Her television roles include Abby on Frayed (2019, 2021), Sophie on Amazing Grace (2021) and Audrey on The Messenger (2023). For her performance in the 2022 horror film Talk to Me, she was nominated for the 2024 AACTA Award for Best Actress in a Supporting Role. She plays a lead role as Amy in the 2025 dark comedy thriller Penny Lane Is Dead.

== Early life and education ==
Alexandra Jensen was born in 1999 or 2000 in Toronto, near Newcastle, New South Wales. During primary school she took drama lessons to overcome her shyness, anxiety and a speech problem. Jensen completed her secondary education at Hunter School of the Performing Arts. While still at school, Jensen took the role of Cogsworth in an amateur stage musical production of Beauty and the Beast Jnr at Young Peoples Theatre, Newcastle from April to May 2015.

In 2017 Jensen undertook separate workshops for voice and accent, screen acting, playwriting and monologue. She followed with further workshops or short courses, in the next year: monologue and scene, playwrighting and acting technique. In June to July 2018, she played Elia, a secondary student, in Impending Everyone by Michael Andrew Collins, at the SBW Stables Theatre, Kings Cross, for the Australian Theatre for Young People (ATYP).

== Career ==
Jensen's first professional audition was for a Foxtel TV series and, despite missing out on the role, Foxtel introduced her to a talent manager. She appeared as Abby, a secondary student in the Newcastle-based comedy-drama TV series Frayed for two seasons in 2019 and 2021. Jensen followed with further TV roles including Sophia in Amazing Grace (2021), and co-lead as Audrey in The Messenger (2023).

In feature films, Jensen's debut lead role occurred in the 2022 independent, Beat. Also in that year she took the major role of Jade in the horror film, Talk to Me. Jensen portrayed Miss Miller in the 2024 horror film The Moogai. She played a lead role as Amy in the 2025 dark comedy thriller Penny Lane Is Dead, in writer-director Mia'Kate Russell's feature film debut.

== Filmography ==
=== Film ===
Year	Title	Role	Notes
2022	The Eagle Flyer	Amy Bird	Short film
2022	Beat	Ellie	
2022	Talk to Me	Jade	
2024	The Moogai	Miss Miller	
2025	Penny Lane Is Dead	Amy	

=== Television ===
Year	Title	Role	Notes
2019, 2021	Frayed	Abby Harris	12 episodes
2019	My Life Is Murder	Gemma Shaw	1 episode
2021	Amazing Grace	Sophia	8 episodes
2022	Joe vs. Carole	Chealsi	3 episodes
2023	The Messenger	Audrey Singer	8 episodes

== Accolades ==
For her performance in Talk to Me, Jensen was nominated for the 2024 AACTA Award for Best Actress in a Supporting Role.
