= Deadly (Australian TV series) =

Australian animated television series

- Genre: Children's animation
- Based on: Deadly! series by Morris Gleitzman and Paul Jennings
- Starring: Sarah Aubrey; Rachel King; Michelle Doake
- Country of origin: Australia
- Original language: English

Original release
- Network: Nine Network
- Release: 2006 – 2010

Deadly is an Australian children's animated television series which first screened on the Nine Network in 2006 and kept airing until 2010. It was produced by SLR Productions and Yoram Gross Productions and financed by the Film Finance Corporation Australia Ltd.

The series is based on the Deadly! novel series written by Morris Gleitzman and Paul Jennings. The story follows the adventures of Sprocket and Amy, trying to escape and meddle with the plans of the Brats.

== Summary ==
Amy is twelve years old, and has to look after her mother – who has turned into a two-year-old. Sprocket is a runaway in search of his family – with only a faded photo to go on. Meanwhile, the seeds of a blue tea plant have been washed into the river system, and any moment now plants will grow that can keep people young forever.

Amy and Sprocket attempt to raise Toddler Mum while opposing Pooper Scooper and his family and stopping the mutating tea plants.

== Characters ==
- Sprocket - The protagonist, who comes to town to investigate who could be the woman on a picture he carried since he was a baby. Voiced by Sarah Aubrey.
- Amy - A girl from town, who gets her mother turned into a baby by the Turner brats. Voiced by Sarah Aubrey.
- Leslie/Toddler Mum - Amy's mother, who was turned into an infant. Despite being a two-year-old now, she seemingly retains some of her adult memories. Voiced by Rachel King.
- The Turner Brats - The antagonists of the show, looking for the secret for germination of the blue plant that provides them eternal youth through its tea.
- Pooper Scooper/Orson - The self-proclaimed leader. Voiced by Michelle Doake.
- Reptile/Hilda - The girl of the group. Voiced by Sarah Aubrey.
- Beanie/Barnabas - The most sensible of the group. Voiced by Rachel King.

== See also ==
- List of Australian television series
