= Amazing Grace (Australian TV series) =

Australian television drama series

- Genre: Drama
- Created by: Sarah Smith; David Maher; David Taylor
- Written by: Jonathan Gavin; Ainslie Clouston; Sarah Smith
- Directed by: Shawn Seet; Lucy Gaffy; Sian Davies
- Country of origin: Australia
- Original language: English
- No. of series: 1
- No. of episodes: 8

Production
- Executive producers: Sarah Smith; Shawn Seet; David Maher; David Taylor
- Producer: Diane Haddon
- Production location: Sydney
- Production company: Playmaker Media

Original release
- Network: Nine Network
- Release: 3 March – 21 April 2021

Amazing Grace is an Australian television drama series which premiered on the Nine Network on 3 March 2021.

The series was cancelled in September 2021.

== Synopsis ==
The series centres on midwife Grace and her passionate colleagues at an unconventional birth centre attached to a major city hospital. A fierce advocate for her pregnant mothers-to- be, Grace's dubious work/life balance is about to get even more chaotic when Sophia, the daughter she gave up for adoption 17 years ago, arrives unannounced and pregnant at the birth centre changes her life forever.

== Production ==
The series was announced at Nine's annual upfronts in September 2020, Kate Jenkinson will play the titular role of Grace, along with supporting actors Sigrid Thornton, Catherine Van Davies, Alexandra Jensen and Kat Hoyos. Filming of the series began in Sydney in October 2020.

== Cast ==
- Kate Jenkinson as Grace Cresswell
- Sigrid Thornton as Diane Cresswell
- Alex Dimitriades as Kirk Gilbert
- Alexandra Jensen as Sophia
- Catherine Văn-Davies as Laney Tran
- Ben O'Toole as Max Shaw
- Kat Hoyos as Sasha Lorente
- Luke Ford as Paul
- Ben Mingay as Jim Delaney
- Morgan Griffin as Tiffany Adams
- Jake Ryan as Tyrone
- Frederick Du Rietz as Jeremy
- Arianthe Galani as Yia Yia
- Andrea Demetriades as Chloe
- Catherine Mack-Hancock as Bonnie
- Lucy Bell as Jodie
- Ella Scott Lynch as Christina

== Episodes ==
| No. | Title | Directed by | Written by | Original release date | Australia viewers (millions) |
|---|---|---|---|---|---|
| 1 | "Episode 1" | Shawn Seet | Jonathan Gavin | 3 March 2021 | 0.570 |
| 2 | "Episode 2" | Shawn Seet | Sarah Smith | 10 March 2021 | 0.509 |
| 3 | "Episode 3" | Lucy Gaffy | Jonathan Gavin | 17 March 2021 | 0.516 |
| 4 | "Episode 4" | Lucy Gaffy | Ainslie Clouston | 24 March 2021 | 0.472 |
| 5 | "Episode 5" | Sian Davies | Jonathan Gavin | 31 March 2021 | 0.495 |
| 6 | "Episode 6" | Sian Davies | Sarah Smith | 7 April 2021 | 0.529 |
| 7 | "Episode 7" | Shawn Seet | Ainslie Clouston | 14 April 2021 | 0.495 |
| 8 | "Episode 8" | Shawn Seet | Jonathan Gavin | 21 April 2021 | 0.402 |
