= Ground Up =

2026 Australian television series

- Genre: Comedy
- Created by: Gary McCaffrie
- Directed by: Wayne Hope
- Starring: Sam Pang; Emma Harvie; Dylan Murphy; Josh McConville; Lucy Durack; Marg Downey
- Country of origin: Australia
- No. of episodes: 6

Production
- Production location: Melbourne

Original release
- Network: ABC
- Release: 7 June 2026 – present

Ground Up is an Australian comedy television series broadcast by the Australian Broadcasting Corporation (ABC), that premiered on 7 June 2026. Produced by Gristmill, the series focuses on the development of a football club and stadium in Tasmania, fronted by Australian Football League (AFL) administrator Hugh Shen (Sam Pang). Shen must win over a divided community, wrangle together a team, and manage his overly bureaucratic organisation.

== Plot ==
The series follows Hobart-via-Melbourne AFL administrator Hugh Shen who has been tasked with establishing Tasmania's first-ever AFL team. He must face the uninterested and angry locals who are funding the $1.13 billion stadium with their taxes.

== Cast ==
In May 2026, the extended cast for the series was announced.

- Sam Pang as Hugo Shen
- Emma Harvie as Destiny Pitt
- Dylan Murphy as Jameson
- Josh McConville as Alistair Penfold
- Lucy Durack as Angela Linscombe
- Marg Downey as Catherine la Fontaine
- Fletcher Humphrys as Cliff

== Production ==
The series was first announced during ABC upfronts on 21 November 2025. It was commissioned and financed by the public broadcaster in association with Screen Australia, VicScreen and Screen Tasmania. The series was filmed in Melbourne.

On 5 May 2026, ABC released the trailer for the series.

== Episodes ==
#	Title	Original Release Date	iview Release Date	Viewers	Ref.
1	"Offensive Pressure"	7 June 2026	7 June 2026	443,000	
2	"Taking Territory"	14 June 2026	7 June 2026	370,000	
3	"Too High"	18 June 2026	7 June 2026	219,000	
4	"Ins and Out"	28 June 2026	7 June 2026	319,000	
5	"Boundaries"	5 July 2026	7 June 2026	320,000	
6	"Contested Possession"	12 July 2026	14 June 2026	310,000	

== Release and reception ==
Ground Up premiered on ABC TV and was released on ABC iview on 7 June 2026.

Critic from The Guardian Luke Buckmaster rated the series three stars out of five, calling the series "easily digestible", but not full of belly laughs.

Critic for The Sydney Morning Herald Paul Kalina rated the series two stars of five and said the series "is eager to please" but bemoaned the lack of creativity in its comedy material.

== See also ==
- Utopia, an Australian comedy television series satirising government infrastructure and bureaucracy
- The Games, an Australian mockumentary television series satirising government corruption in the 2000 Sydney Olympic Games
