= The Infinite Man (film) =

- Theatrical release poster
- Directed by: Hugh Sullivan
- Written by: Hugh Sullivan
- Produced by: Kate Croser; Sandy Cameron
- Starring: Josh McConville; Hannah Marshall; Alex Dimitriades
- Cinematography: Marden Dean
- Edited by: Hugh Sullivan
- Production companies: Hedone Productions, in association with Bonsai Films
- Distributed by: Infinite Releasing
- Release dates: 7 March 2014 (SXSW); 18 September 2014 (Australia)
- Running time: 85 minutes
- Country: Australia
- Language: English

The Infinite Man is a 2014 Australian science fiction film directed by Hugh Sullivan.

== Plot ==
Dean, an inventor, plans a special weekend getaway at a hotel to celebrate his anniversary with his girlfriend Lana. However, the romantic weekend is interrupted when Lana's ex-boyfriend Terry unexpectedly shows up. After a disastrous confrontation, Lana leaves.

Distraught, Dean spends a year at the hotel building a machine to re-do the day. On the day of their anniversary, Dean calls Lana and begs her to come back, hoping to fix their disastrous date. The pair use the machine, when they realize that they've actually gone back in time. However, this intervention leads to unforeseen complications; now there are two pairs of Deans and Lanas, and every attempt Dean makes to remedy the situation does nothing to mitigate it.

The Dean from the original timeline and the Dean from the altered timeline compete for Lana's attention, but make things worse. As they attempt further time-travel intervention, more versions of Dean, Lana, and even Terry appear, each with varying knowledge of the events that have transpired.

The hotel becomes a maze of overlapping timelines filled with Deans, all trying to fix the situation. Lana becomes increasingly distressed by Dean's inability to give up control, ultimately culminating in a fight where Dean narrates Lana's lines to her through an earpiece. The original Dean eventually realizes that each attempt to repair the weekend only makes things worse. In a final attempt to set things right, he tries to destroy the machine, preventing any of the subsequent timelines from occurring.

Dean reaches the initial point, but before he can destroy the time machine is interrupted by an argument with the Lana that has traveled through time with him. Dean realizes that the real problem is with his own insecurities, and promises to get better before continuing a relationship with Lana. As Lana walks away, Dean sees a future-version of himself reconnect with Lana in the distance.

== Cast ==
- Josh McConville as Dean
- Hannah Marshall as Lana
- Alex Dimitriades as Terry

== Release ==
The movie was released in France (on demand) on 25 June 2015.

== Reception ==
The Infinite Man received favourable reviews from film critics. Rotten Tomatoes reports a 94% approval rating and an average score of 7.86/10, based on 18 reviews.

Luke Buckmaster of Guardian Australia gave it five stars.

== See also ==
- List of films featuring time loops
