= RFDS (TV series) =

Australian TV series

- Also known as: RFDS: Royal Flying Doctor Service
- Genre: Drama
- Created by: Imogen Banks; Mark Fennessy; Ian Meadows
- Written by: Ian Meadows; Claire Phillips; Adrian Russell Wills; Jon Bell
- Directed by: Jennifer Leacey; Jeremy Sims; Adrian Russell Wills
- Country of origin: Australia
- Original language: English
- No. of series: 3
- No. of episodes: 24

Production
- Executive producers: Mark Fennessy; Carl Fennessy; Julie McGauran
- Producers: Imogen Banks; Sara Richardson
- Production location: Broken Hill
- Production company: Endemol Shine Australia

Original release
- Network: Seven Network
- Release: 11 August 2021 – present

RFDS: Royal Flying Doctor Service is an Australian drama television series which centres on the lives of workers for the Royal Flying Doctor Service. Commissioned by the Seven Network and produced by Endemol Shine Australia, it began airing on 11 August 2021. The second season commenced screening on 15 August 2023, and on 18 August 2024, the series was renewed for a third season, and filming began in South Australia.

== Synopsis ==
RFDS centres around the lives of workers for the Royal Flying Doctor Service in Australia.

== Cast ==
- Emma Hamilton as Dr. Eliza Harrod
- Stephen Peacocke as Nurse Pete Emerson
- Rob Collins as Dr. Wayne Yates
- Ash Ricardo as Mira Ortez
- Jack Scott as Nurse Matty Harris
- Rodney Afif as Graham Morley
- Sofia Nolan as Taylor Emerson
- Thomas Weatherall as Darren Yates
- Justine Clarke as Leonie Smith
- Emma Harvie as Chaya Batra
- Elaine Crombie as Ursula
- Victoria Eagger as Georgie Madden

== Production ==
Production on RFDS commenced in 2020. The series is written by Ian Meadows and produced by Imogen Banks for Endemol Shine, executive produced by Mark and Carl Fennessy for Endemol Shine Australia and Julie McGauran for Seven.

The series was due to begin production in Broken Hill in March 2020. However, due to the COVID-19 pandemic the series was temporarily suspended. Production resumed in August 2020 along with announcement of more cast members including Emma Hamilton, Ash Ricardo, Kate Mulvany, Rodney Afif, Jack Scott and Sofia Nolan, with newcomers Thomas Weatherall and Ash Hodgkinson. The first promotional trailer for the series was released in July 2021.

In June 2022, it was reported that the series had been renewed for a second season, which was broadcast in 2023.

In October 2023, it was announced that the series would be renewed for a third season, which commenced production in August 2024. Filming started in South Australia, in Adelaide Studios as well as on location in the Flinders Ranges town of Quorn, the Port Augusta RFDS Base and regional surrounds, which will double for Broken Hill, as the real Broken Hill airport and RFDS base were being upgraded. The third season premiered on 1 October 2025.

== Broadcast ==
Season 1 of RFDS began airing on 11 August 2021.

It was renewed for a second season in June 2022, which commenced screening on 15 August 2023.

It was renewed for a third season in October 2023, which commenced screening on 1 October 2025.

== Episodes ==
=== Season 1 (2021) ===
No. overall	No. in season	Title	Directed by	Written by	Original release date	Australian viewers
1	1	"Episode 1"	Jennifer Leacy	Ian Meadows	11 August 2021	604,000
2	2	"Episode 2"	Jennifer Leacy	Ian Meadows	18 August 2021	513,000
3	3	"Episode 3"	Jeremy Sims	Claire Phillips	25 August 2021	465,000
4	4	"Episode 4"	Jeremy Sims	Claire Phillips	1 September 2021	472,000
5	5	"Episode 5"	Adrian Russell Wills	Ian Meadows & Adrian Russell Wills	8 September 2021	427,000
6	6	"Episode 6"	Adrian Russell Wills	Ian Meadows & Jon Bell	8 September 2021	396,000
7	7	"Episode 7"	Jennifer Leacey	Claire Phillips	15 September 2021	417,000
8	8	"Episode 8"	Jennifer Leacey	Ian Meadows	22 September 2021	417,000

=== Season 2 (2023) ===
No. overall	No. in season	Title	Directed by	Written by	Original release date	Australian viewers
9	1	"The Vortex"	Jeremy Sims	Ian Meadows	15 August 2023	378,000
10	2	"The Return"	Jeremy Sims	Claire Phillips & Ian Meadows	22 August 2023	392,000
11	3	"Corrections"	Rachel Ward	Magda Wozniak	29 August 2023	375,000
12	4	"Yartu/Crosswinds"	Rachel Ward	Kodie Bedford	5 September 2023	307,000
13	5	"Kaakutja/Brother"	Adrian Russell Wills	Adrian Russell Wills	12 September 2023	283,000
14	6	"Kaanya/Collapse"	Adrian Russell Wills	Ian Meadows	19 September 2023	324,000
15	7	"Boundaries"	Jeremy Sims	Claire Phillips	26 September 2023	299,000
16	8	"Kiira/Country"	Jeremy Sims	Ian Meadows	4 October 2023	279,000

=== Season 3 (2025) ===
No. overall	No. in season	Title	Directed by	Written by	Original release date	Australian viewers (National)
17	1	"Sieve & Sort"	Shawn Seet	Ian Meadows	1 October 2025	771,000
18	2	"Separation Anxiety"	Shawn Seet	Kodie Bedford	8 October 2025	777,000
19	3	"Source Control"	Adrian Russell Wills	Magda Wozniak	15 October 2025	759,000
20	4	"Non Negative"	Adrian Russell Wills	Ian Meadows	22 October 2025	838,000
21	5	"Blood"	Leticia Caceres	Julia Moriarty	29 October 2025	794,000
22	6	"Step Potential"	Leticia Caceres	Adrian Russell Wills	5 November 2025	849,000
23	7	"Duty of Care"	Ian Watson	Kodie Bedford	12 November 2025	761,000
24	8	"Accountability"	Ian Meadows	Ian Meadows	12 November 2025	707,000

== Reception ==
=== Ratings ===
RFDS : Australia viewers per episode (thousands)

Season	Episode number							
Season	1	2	3	4	5	6	7	8
1	604	513	465	472	427	396	417	417
2	378	392	375	307	283	324	299	279
3	771	777	759	838	794	849	761	707

Source: Audience measurement performed by OzTam

==== Season 1 (2021) ====
No.	Title	Air date	Overnight ratings		Consolidated ratings		Total viewers	Ref(s)
No.	Title	Air date	Viewers	Rank	Viewers	Rank	Total viewers	Ref(s)
1	"Episode 1"	11 August 2021	604,000	12	101,000	10	705,000	
2	"Episode 2"	18 August 2021	513,000	15	116,000	10	632,000	
3	"Episode 3"	25 August 2021	465,000	14	100,000	11	565,000	
4	"Episode 4"	1 September 2021	472,000	15	98,000	10	570,000	
5	"Episode 5"	8 September 2021	427,000	16	109,000	9	536,000	
6	"Episode 6"	8 September 2021	396,000	19	118,000	11	514,000	
7	"Episode 7"	15 September 2021	417,000	19	132,000	11	549.000	
8	"Episode 8"	22 September 2021	417,000	17	124,000	12	542,000	

==== Season 2 (2023) ====
No.	Title	Air date	Overnight ratings		Consolidated ratings		Total viewers	Ref(s)
No.	Title	Air date	Viewers	Rank	Viewers	Rank	Total viewers	Ref(s)
1	"Episode 1"	15 August 2023	378,000	13	104,000	10	482,000	
2	"Episode 2"	22 August 2023	392,000	14	220,000	9	392,000	
3	"Episode 3"	29 August 2023	375,000	13	228,000	8	375,000	
4	"Episode 4"	5 September 2023	307,000	16	120,00	10	307,000	
5	"Episode 5"	12 September 2023	283,000	16	148,000	10	283,000	
6	"Episode 6"	19 September 2023	324,000	15	134,000	10	324,000	
7	"Episode 7"	26 September 2023	299,000	16	125,000	11	299,000	
8	"Episode 8"	4 October 2023	279,000	17	105,000	11	279,000	

==== Season 3 (2025) ====
No.	Title	Air date	Overnight ratings		Consolidated ratings		Total viewers	Ref(s)
No.	Title	Air date	Viewers	Rank	Viewers	Rank	Total viewers	Ref(s)
1	"Episode 1"	1 October 2025	1,207,000	9	384,000	5	1,591,000	
2	"Episode 2"	8 October 2025	1,245,000	8	340,000	5	1,585,000	
3	"Episode 3"	15 October 2025	1,242,000	7	367,000	5	1,609,000	
4	"Episode 4"	22 October 2025	1,336,000	6	354,000	3	1,690,000	
5	"Episode 5"	29 October 2025	1,302,000	6	398,000	3	1,700,000	
6	"Episode 6"	5 November 2025	1,330,000	6	357,000	3	1,687,000	
7	"Episode 7"	12 November 2025	1,147,000	9	365,000	3	1,512,000	
8	"Episode 8"	12 November 2025	1,045,000	12	454,000	4	1,499,000	

== Awards and nominations ==
Year	Association	Category	Recipient	Result	Ref.
2022	Logie Awards	Most Popular Actor	Steve Peacocke	Nominated	
2022	Logie Awards	Most Popular Drama Program	RFDS	Nominated	
2022	Logie Awards	Most Outstanding Drama Series	RFDS	Nominated	
2024	Logie Awards	Best Drama Program	RFDS	Won	
2026	Logie Awards	Best Drama Program	RFDS	Won	
2026	Logie Awards	Best Lead Actor in a Drama	Rob Collins	Nominated	
2026	Logie Awards	Best Lead Actor in a Drama	Steve Peacocke	Nominated	

== Home media ==
It was announced by Via Vision Entertainment in June 2024 that they would be releasing the RFDS Seasons one and two on DVD in one collection.

Title	Format	Ep#	Discs	Region 1 (USA)	Region 2 (UK)	Region 4 (Australia)	Special features	Distributors
RFDS (Season One)	DVD	8	2	21 December 2021			None	PBS
RFDS (Season Two)	DVD	8	2	9 April 2024			None	PBS
RFDS (Season One & Two)	DVD	16	4			4 September 2024	None	Via Vision Entertainment
