= Everybody Loves Somebody (film) =

2017 Mexican romantic comedy film

- Directed by: Catalina Aguilar Mastretta
- Written by: Catalina Aguilar Mastretta
- Produced by: Francisco González Compeán; Jose Nacif; Ramiro Ruiz
- Starring: Karla Souza; José María Yazpik
- Cinematography: Jon Aguirresarobe
- Edited by: Christopher C.F. Chow
- Music by: Victor Hernández Stumpfhauser
- Distributed by: Pantelion Films
- Release dates: 7 January 2017 (Palm Springs); 17 February 2017
- Running time: 102 minutes
- Country: Mexico
- Languages: English; Spanish

Everybody Loves Somebody is a 2017 Mexican romantic comedy film written and directed by Catalina Aguilar Mastretta, and starring Karla Souza and José María Yazpik.

== Plot ==
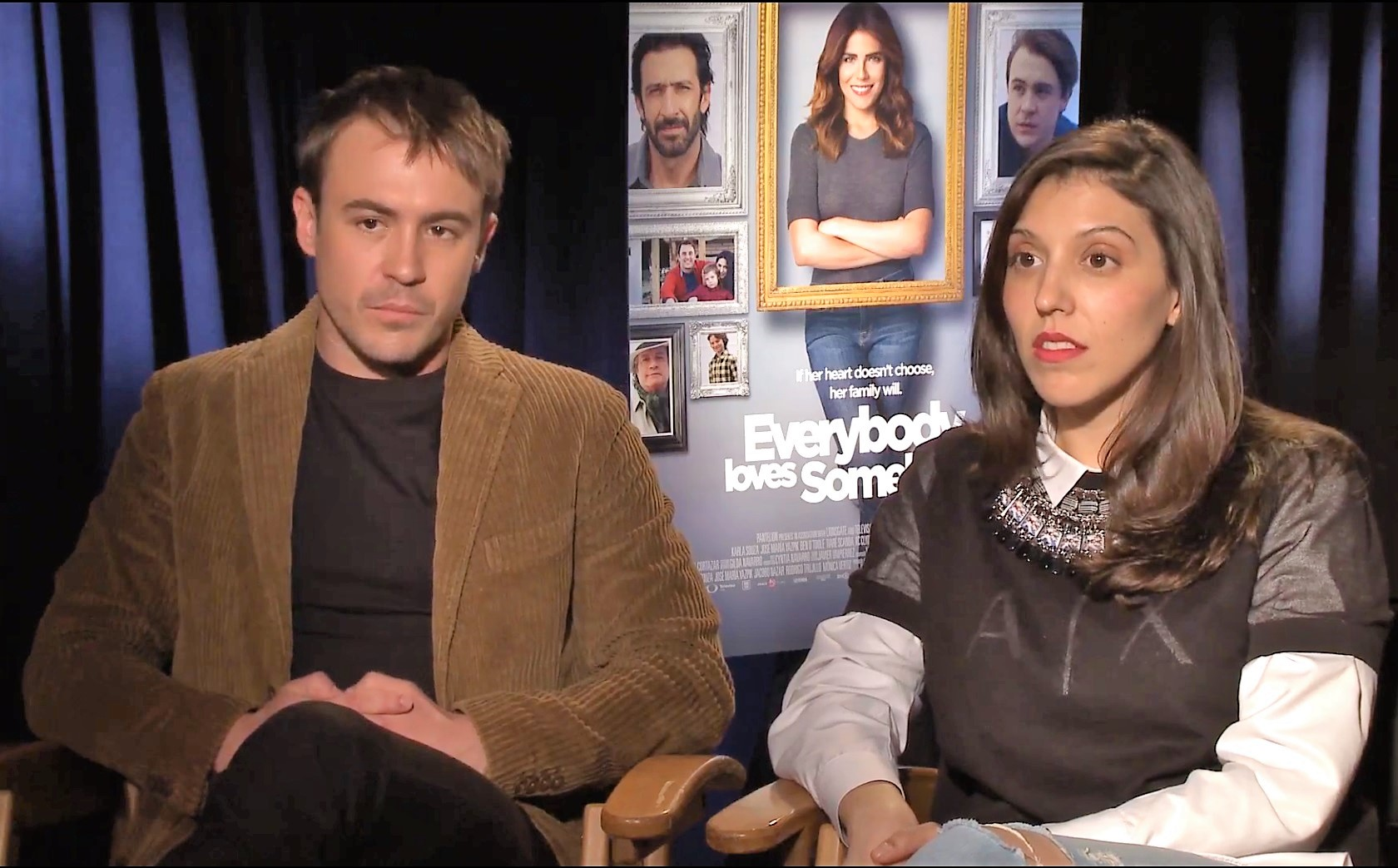
Ben O'Toole and Catalina Aguilar interviewed about the film in 2017

A successful and single physician officially provides obstetrics and gynaecology service but also gives couples advice on happiness. The twist is that she has not enjoyed success in her own romantic life. She travels between her job in the United States and her immediate family's location in Mexico. She asks her co-worker to pose as her boyfriend at a family wedding back in Mexico. When her ex beau shows up, comedy mayhem takes place.

== Cast ==
- Karla Souza as Clara
- José María Yazpik as Daniel
- Ben O'Toole as Asher
- Alejandro Camacho as Francisco
- Patricia Bernal as Eva
- Tiaré Scanda as Abby
- Ximena Romo as Lily Álvarez

== Reception ==
The film received positive reviews and has a 93% rating on Rotten Tomatoes.
