= 12 Strong =

2018 American action-war film by Nicolai Fuglsig

- Theatrical release poster
- Directed by: Nicolai Fuglsig
- Written by: Ted Tally; Peter Craig
- Based on: Horse Soldiers by Doug Stanton
- Produced by: Jerry Bruckheimer; Molly Smith; Thad Luckinbill; Trent Luckinbill
- Starring: Chris Hemsworth; Michael Shannon; Michael Peña; Navid Negahban; Trevante Rhodes; Geoff Stults; Thad Luckinbill
- Cinematography: Rasmus Videbæk
- Edited by: Lisa Lassek
- Music by: Lorne Balfe
- Production companies: Alcon Entertainment; Black Label Media; Jerry Bruckheimer Films; Torridon Films
- Distributed by: Warner Bros. Pictures (United States and Canada); Lionsgate (International)
- Release dates: January 16, 2018 (Jazz at Lincoln Center); January 19, 2018 (United States)
- Running time: 129 minutes
- Country: United States
- Language: English
- Budget: $35 million
- Box office: $71.1 million

12 Strong (also known as 12 Strong: The Declassified True Story of the Horse Soldiers) is a 2018 American action-war film directed by Nicolai Fuglsig and written by Ted Tally and Peter Craig. The film is based on Doug Stanton's non-fiction book Horse Soldiers, which tells the story of U.S. Army Special Forces sent to Afghanistan immediately after the September 11 attacks and up to the fall of Mazar-i-Sharif. The film stars Chris Hemsworth, Michael Shannon, Michael Peña, Navid Negahban, Trevante Rhodes, Geoff Stults, Thad Luckinbill, Ben O'Toole, William Fichtner, and Rob Riggle.

Principal photography began in January 2017 in New Mexico. The film was released in the United States on January 19, 2018, by Warner Bros. Pictures, in standard and IMAX theaters. It received mixed reviews from critics, who praised the cast and action but criticized the by-the-numbers execution and lack of insight of the War in Afghanistan.

== Plot ==
Mitch Nelson, a U.S. Army captain with Green Berets Operational Detachment Alpha (ODA) 595, is moving into a new home with his wife and daughter on September 11, 2001, after receiving an assignment to staff duty under Lieutenant Colonel Bowers. As news of the devastating terrorist attacks that day breaks, Nelson volunteers to lead 595 into Afghanistan. Bowers initially refuses, but veteran warrant officer Hal Spencer, previously scheduled to retire, persuades Bowers to give Nelson command of 595 again, as well as volunteering himself for the deployment. After leaving their families, 595 travels to Uzbekistan on October 7, 2001. After being briefed and evaluated by Colonel Mulholland, Commander of 5th Special Forces Group, Nelson and 595 are picked to fight alongside Northern Alliance leader Abdul Rashid Dostum.

ODA 595 is inserted covertly in Afghanistan by helicopter. They land 40 miles south of Mazar-i-Sharif, the country's fourth-largest city and a longtime stronghold of the Taliban, where they meet Dostum. Six members, led by Nelson, leave with Dostum to the mountains, while the other six remain in a fortified camp nicknamed "the Alamo" under Spencer's command. Dostum is attempting to capture the northern Afghanistan city, while battling Taliban leader Mullah Razzan, who rules local communities brutally under his version of Sharia, and has murdered several people, including Dostum's family. Although the warlord is initially skeptical of Nelson's abilities, Nelson gradually earns Dostum's respect. In one battle, however, Dostum makes a tactical error, costing several casualties. Nelson accuses Dostum of acting carelessly with the lives of his men and of withholding valuable information, while Dostum retorts that he still feels that Nelson, and the U.S. are not willing to pay the potential price of the conflict, and tells Nelson that he needs to use his heart and mind to "be a warrior" instead of a soldier. The two eventually reconcile and after splitting off a three-man element under SFC Sam Diller to strike a Taliban supply route and being joined by Spencer's half of ODA 595, continue to work together. They win several victories with Dostum's leadership and manpower and American airpower, making significant progress towards Mazar-i Sharif. When Nelson informs Dostum that another ODA, 555, has been dispatched to support Atta Muhammad, another Northern Alliance leader, who is Dostum's political rival, Dostum is furious, and his men promptly abandon 595.

Following Dostum's departure, Nelson plans to continue operating against the Taliban with his Americans and the few Afghan fighters remaining with them. Encountering a large force of Al-Qaeda and Taliban fighters and armored vehicles, ODA 595, rejoined by Diller and his element, uses air support to eliminate many of the fighters and most of the armor, but are discovered and attacked. Spencer is critically injured by a suicide bomber, and the team is about to be overrun under heavy Taliban and Al-Qaeda pressure when Dostum returns with his forces. Carrying out the U.S. Army's first cavalry charge of the 21st century, the American and Northern Alliance forces disperse the Taliban and al-Qaeda, and Dostum tracks down and kills Razzan. After Spencer is medevaced, Nelson and Dostum continue to Mazar-i-Sharif but find Atta Muhammad has beaten them there. Against expectations, Dostum leaves any differences with Muhammad to be settled the next day. Impressed by Nelson and the Americans' efforts, Dostum gives Nelson his prized riding crop and tells him that he will always consider Nelson a brother and fellow fighter, at the same time bidding him remember that Afghanistan is the graveyard of empires. Spencer ultimately survives, and all 12 soldiers of ODA 595 return home after 23 days of almost continuous fighting in Afghanistan.

== Cast ==
- Chris Hemsworth as Captain Mitch Nelson, U.S. Army Special Forces Officer and ODA 595's commander, inspired by Mark Nutsch.
- Michael Shannon as Chief Warrant Officer Hal Spencer, a U.S. Army Special Forces Chief Warrant Officer 5 and ODA 595's assistant team leader, inspired by Bob Pennington
- Michael Peña as Sergeant First Class Sam Diller, ODA 595's Intelligence Sergeant First Class
- Navid Negahban as General A. R. Dostum, a leader of the Northern Alliance and future Vice President of Afghanistan
- Trevante Rhodes as Sergeant First Class Ben Milo, a Special Forces Weapons Sergeant in ODA 595
- William Fichtner as Colonel John F. Mulholland, Commander of 5th Special Forces Group
- Geoff Stults as Sean Coffers, a member of ODA 595
- Thad Luckinbill as Vern Michaels, a member of ODA 595
- Ben O'Toole as Scott Black, a member of ODA 595
- Kenny Sheard as Sergeant First Class Bill Bennett, a member of ODA 595
- Austin Stowell as Staff Sergeant Fred Falls, a member of ODA 595
- Austin Hébert as Master Sergeant Pat Essex, a member of ODA 595
- Jack Kesy as Charles Jones, a member of ODA 595
- Kenneth Miller as Kevin Jackson, a member of ODA 595
- Elsa Pataky as Jean Nelson, Mitch's wife
- Rob Riggle as Lt. Colonel Max Bowers, Commander of 3rd Battalion, 5th Special Forces Group
- Taylor Sheridan as Brian, a paramilitary field officer with the CIA's Special Activities Division who meets ODA 595 when the SOAR deliver them to Afghanistan
- Fahim Fazli as Khaled, a commander in Afghanistan's Northern Alliance
- Laith Nakli as Commander Ahmed Lal
- Numan Acar as Mullah Razzan
- Marie Wagenman as Maddie Nelson, Mitch's daughter
- Ali Olomi as Afghan Man
- Hasan Hoseini as Afghan man

== Production ==
=== Development ===
On December 2, 2011, it was announced that producer Jerry Bruckheimer had taken out the script by Ted Tally and rewritten by Peter Craig with Nicolai Fuglsig attached to direct, which was bought by Walt Disney Pictures in 2009 for Bruckheimer, based on Doug Stanton's non-fiction book Horse Soldiers. On March 29, 2016, Deadline Hollywood reported that Bruckheimer had officially hired Fuglsig to make his feature film directorial debut, which would be co-financed and produced by Molly Smith, Trent Luckinbill and Thad Luckinbill through Black Label Media, along with Bruckheimer's Jerry Bruckheimer Films.

=== Casting ===
On September 30, 2016, Chris Hemsworth and Michael Shannon were cast in the film, and later on November 1, Michael Peña also joined the film. On November 3, 2016, Trevante Rhodes was cast in the film. On November 14, 2016, Austin Stowell was cast in the film to play Staff Sergeant Fred Falls, an American soldier on the elite U.S. Special Forces team. Lionsgate would handle the film's distribution. On November 15, 2016, Austin Hébert was cast to play SFC Pat Essex, the intellectual and engineer of the team, and the same day it was reported that Ben O'Toole had also been cast for an unspecified role. On November 17, 2016, Variety reported that Navid Negahban was cast to play General Abdul Rashid Dostum in the film. Elsa Pataky was revealed to be appearing in the film in December 2016, while on February 3, 2017, Deadline Hollywood reported that Rob Riggle joined the film to play Army Lieutenant Colonel Max Bowers, under whom Riggle actually served while he was a U.S. Marine Captain.

=== Filming ===
Principal photography began in early January 2017 in New Mexico. Mines near Orogrande, New Mexico, were used. Later the shooting took place in Socorro, where it ended on January 26 after eight days of filming. The film was also shot in Alamogordo, using White Sands National Monument as the shooting location. The scenes involving military encampments were filmed using 20 structures leased from AKS Military, a private manufacturer of military shelters.

=== Postscript ===
The films postscript reads as follows: "Against overwhelming odds, all twelve members of the U.S. Army Special Forces ODA 595 survived their mission. The capture of Mazar-i-Sharif by the Horse Soldiers and their counterparts is one of the US military's most stunning achievements. Military planners predicted it would take two years. Task Force Dagger did it in three weeks. Al Qaeda considers this to be their worst defeat. Because their mission was classified, the men of Special Forces ODA 595 returned home to their everyday lives with no fanfare or public acknowledgment of the near impossible mission they completed. In 2014, General Dostum became Vice President of Afghanistan. Dostum and Mitch Nelson remain close friends to this day. In 2012, to honor their extraordinary heroism, a statue of a Horse Soldier was dedicated at the World Trade Center site."

== Release ==
=== Home media ===
Warner Bros. Home Entertainment released 12 Strong digitally April 10, and on Blu-ray Disc and DVD May 1. Blu-ray extras include the featurettes "12 Strong: The Making of an Impossible Mission" and "Monumental Effort: Building America's Response Monument."

== Reception ==
=== Box office ===
12 Strong grossed $45.8 million in the United States and Canada, and $25.3 million in other territories, for a worldwide total of $71.1 million, against a production budget of $35 million.

In the United States and Canada, 12 Strong was released on January 19, 2018, alongside Den of Thieves and Forever My Girl, as well as the wide expansions of Phantom Thread, I, Tonya and Call Me by Your Name, and was projected to gross $15–20 million from 3,002 theaters in its opening weekend. It ended up debuting to $15.8 million, similar to the $16.1 million that another war film 13 Hours: The Secret Soldiers of Benghazi opened to in January 2016, and finished second at the box office behind Jumanji: Welcome to the Jungle. According to ComScore, 55% of the opening weekend audience was male, with 79% being over the age of 25. The following week dropped 45% to $8.6 million, finishing 6th at the box office.

=== Critical response ===
On Rotten Tomatoes, the film has an approval rating of 50% based on 173 reviews, and an average rating of 5.5/10. The website's critical consensus reads, "12 Strong has a solid cast, honorable intentions, and a thrilling, fact-based story — all of which are occasionally enough to balance a disappointing lack of depth or nuance." On Metacritic, the film has a weighted average score of 54 out of 100, based on reviews from 43 critics, indicating "mixed or average" reviews. Audiences polled by CinemaScore gave the film an average grade of "A" on an A+ to F scale, while PostTrak reported filmgoers gave an 81% overall positive score and a 63% "definite recommend".

Richard Roeper of the Chicago Sun-Times gave the film 2.5 out of 4 stars, saying, "...with a running time of two hours and 10 minutes, 12 Strong has at least 20 minutes of scenes that are either unnecessary or repetitive...[it] winds up being an almost-good film about some great American soldiers." Owen Gleiberman of Variety wrote: "On its own terms, the film is watchable enough, but it’s blunt and stolid and under-characterized, and at 130 minutes it plods." Gleiberman notes that the soldiers riding on horseback do not amount to much, but praises the director and cinematographer for using the New Mexico locations to conjure the landscape of Afghanistan, calling it the most impressive aspect of the film.

=== Accolades ===
Award	Date of ceremony	Category	Recipient(s)	Result	Ref(s)
People's Choice Awards	November 11, 2018	Drama Movie of 2018	12 Strong	Nominated	
People's Choice Awards	November 11, 2018	Drama Movie Star of 2018	Chris Hemsworth	Nominated	
Visual Effects Society Awards	February 5, 2019	Outstanding Supporting Visual Effects in a Photoreal Feature	Roger Nall, Robert Weaver, Mike Meinardus	Nominated	

== Related links ==
- 5th Special Forces Group
- America's Response Monument
