= Hannah Marshall (actress) =

New Zealand actress

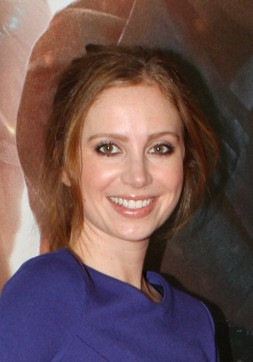
- Hannah Marshall in 2013
- Born: 17 July 1984 (age 42); New Zealand
- Occupation: Actor

Hannah Marshall is a New Zealand actress, screenwriter, director and producer. She played Beth Wilson on Shortland Street and Loretta Schembri on Packed to the Rafters. She acted in, and was a story producer for, Raised by Refugees.

Marshall was nominated for the Logie Award for Most Popular New Female Talent in 2011 for her role in Packed to the Rafters.

Marshall is originally from Greenlane in Auckland and moved to Australia in 2007 to further her acting career. She spent time in Los Angeles pursuing acting. She returned to New Zealand to write and direct Alibi. She wrote and directed the short film Frankie Jean & The Morning Star. Since 2022 she has been the Head of Scripted Development at South Pacific Pictures.

== Filmography ==
=== Film ===
Year	Title	Role	Notes
2010	Veneer	Alena	Short
2014	The Infinite Man	Lana	
2014	The Gift	Susan	Short
2014	Izzy Girl	Rachel	Short
2016	Valley Heist	Kate	Short

=== Television ===
Year	Title	Role	Notes
2007	Reckless Behavior: Caught on Tape	Lorraine	TV film
2007	Shortland Street	Beth Wilson	Recurring role
2007–2010	The Amazing Extraordinary Friends	Vicki Van Horton	Main role
2008	Burying Brian	Kimberley	Regular role
2009	Diplomatic Immunity	Kirsty	Regular role
2009	All Saints	Sandra	Episode: "Duty Bound 2"
2010–2013	Packed to the Rafters	Loretta 'Retta' Schembri	Recurring role (series 3–4), main (series 5–6)
2014	ANZAC Girls	Sister Millicent Parker	Episode: "Adventure"
2014	NCIS	Maggie (young)	Episode: "So It Goes"
2015	The Messengers	Hope Silburn	Episode: "Drums of War"
2016	Westside	Joanne	Recurring role (series 2)
2016	Scary Endings	Sharon Bradley	Episode: "Santa Claus is a Vampire"
2017	Undocumented	Bonnie	TV film
2018	James Patterson's Murder Is Forever	Alecia Schmul	Episode: "Home Sweet Murder"
2018	Alibi	Sophie	TV series
2018	The Bad Seed	Tamara Goldwater	Regular role
2019	Ablaze	Violet May Cody	TV film
2019	The Morning Show	Veronique	Episode: "Chaos Is the New Cocaine"
2021	My Life Is Murder	Lydia	1 episode
2021	Alibi	Sophie	7 episodes
2022	Back to the Rafters	Retta Schembri-Karandonis	1 episode
2022	Raised by Refugees	Miss Peacocke	3 episodes
