= Ben O'Toole =

Australian film and television actor

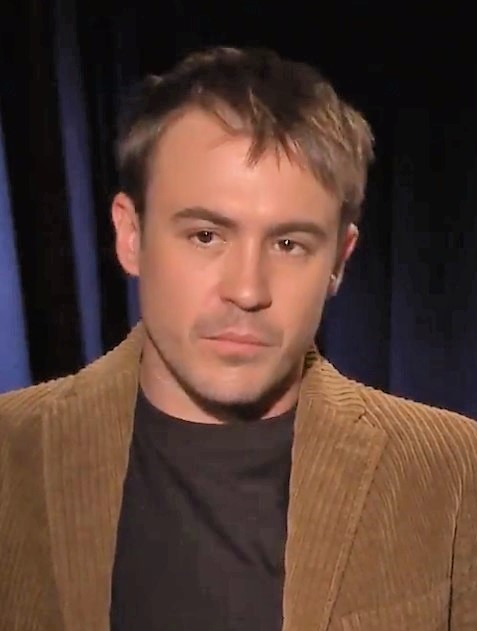
- Ben O'Toole during an interview about Everybody Loves Somebody in 2017
- Born: Cairns, Queensland, Australia
- Education: Western Australian Academy of Performing Arts (WAAPA) (2009–2011)
- Occupation: Actor
- Years active: 2011–present
- Known for: Bloody Hell; Amazing Grace; Hacksaw Ridge; 12 Strong; Nekrotronic; Caught; Penny Lane Is Dead

Ben O'Toole is an Australian actor. He is known for his role as Rex Coen in Bloody Hell, his recurring roles in several Australian TV series such as Amazing Grace, as well as for his supporting roles in films such as Hacksaw Ridge (2016) and 12 Strong (2018). He plays Angus in the 2025 dark comedy thriller Penny Lane Is Dead. He has also appeared on stage many times, including as Happy Loman in Death of a Salesman in 2013 and again in 2024.

== Early life and education ==
Ben O'Toole was born in Cairns and grew up in Brisbane, Queensland.

He began performing in the theatre while he studied acting at the Western Australian Academy of Performing Arts (WAAPA) from 2009 until 2011.

== Career ==
=== Screen ===
After graduating in 2011, O'Toole's first screen appearance was in a web series titled Sintillate Studios. He eventually relocated to Sydney where he continued his work in theatre and acted in several short films. His first appearance in an internationally released film was in The Water Diviner in 2014, alongside Russell Crowe. That same year, he was cast in the role of Pete in the first three seasons of the TV series Love Child. In 2016, he played the role of Corporal Tom (second in command to drill sergeant Howell played by Vince Vaughn) in the award-winning biographical war film Hacksaw Ridge, directed by Mel Gibson.

O'Toole moved to Los Angeles in early 2016. He acted in commercially successful Hollywood films that provided more international exposure and showcased broader recognition of his acting abilities. His first leading role was the romantic comedy, Everybody Loves Somebody (2017), which was well received by critics. In 2018, he performed as main actor in the Australian film Nekrotronic, which was nominated for Best Makeup at the 9th AACTA Awards, but otherwise was rather poorly received both by audiences and critics.

During the COVID-19 pandemic, O'Toole almost exclusively appeared in Australian productions. In addition to his performances in series television, he landed the lead role in the horror comedy Bloody Hell, where he assumed the role of protagonist and also embodied the hallucinations of his alter ego.

O'Toole plays a major role as Angus in the 2025 dark comedy thriller Penny Lane Is Dead, in writer-director Mia'Kate Russell's feature film debut.

=== Stage ===
O'Toole has also appeared regularly in theatre. In 2022 he appeared in The Tenant of Wildfell Hall.

In 2024, he reprised his 2013 role of Happy in Death of a Salesman.

== Filmography ==
=== Film ===
Year	Title	Role	Notes	Ref.
2014	The Water Diviner	Henry Connor	supporting role	
2016	Hacksaw Ridge	Corporal Jessop		
2017	Everybody Loves Somebody	Asher	lead role	
2017	Pirates of the Caribbean: Dead Men Tell No Tales	British Soldier	supporting role	
2017	Detroit	Flynn Marko		
2018	12 Strong	Scott Black		
2018	Nekrotronic	Howard North	leading actor	
2020	Bloody Hell	Rex Coen	leading actor	
2025	Penny Lane Is Dead	Angus	leading actor	

=== Television ===
Year	Title	Role	Notes	Ref.
2011	Sintillate Studios	Justin	Web series, 6 episodes	
2014-2016	Love Child	Pete	17 episodes	
2019	Catalina Aguilar Mastretta Project	Mack	Pilot episode (unreleased)	
2020	Halifax: Retribution	Jarrod/Daniel	6 episodes	
2021	Amazing Grace	Max Shaw	8 episodes	
2022	Pieces of Her	Young Ali Wexler	2 episodes	
2022	Barons	Snapper Webster	Lead role, 8 episodes	
2023	Caught	Rowdy Gaines	6 episodes	
2024	Boy Swallows Universe	Teddy Callis	3 episodes	

== Stage ==
Year	Title	Role	Notes	Ref
2011	Blood Will Have Blood	Macbeth / Oberon	WAAPA	
2011	The Laramie Project	Rulon Stacey / Father Roger Schmidt / Jonas Slonaker	WAAPA	
2011	Ruben Guthrie	Ruben Guthrie	WAAPA	
2011	Nana	Marquis de Chouard	WAAPA	
2012	Boy Gets Girl	Mercer	Heath Ledger Theatre, Perth with Black Swan State Theatre Company	
2013	Death of a Salesman	Happy Loman	Heath Ledger Theatre, Perth with Black Swan State Theatre Company	
2014	Mojo		STC	
2014	The Sublime	Liam	MTC	
2015	Freak Winds	Henry Crumb	Old Fitzroy Theatre, Sydney	
2015	Men	Crazy Bob	Old Fitzroy Theatre, Sydney	
2022	The Tenant of Wildfell Hall	Arthur Huntington	Roslyn Packer Theatre with STC	
2023	On the Beach	Peter Holmes	Roslyn Packer Theatre with STC	
2023	A Streetcar Named Desire	Stanley Kowalski	Old Fitzroy Theatre, Sydney with STC	
2024	37	Joe	Bille Brown Theatre, Brisbane with MTC & Queensland Theatre	
2024	Death of a Salesman	Happy Loman	Theatre Royal, Sydney, Crown Theatre, Perth	
