= Penny Lane Is Dead =

2025 Australian film

- Film poster
- Directed by: Mia'kate Russell
- Written by: Mia'kate Russell
- Produced by: Ari Harrison; Andre Lima; Carly Maple; Julie Ryan
- Starring: Alexandra Jensen; Steve Le Marquand; Ben O'Toole
- Cinematography: Liam Gilmour
- Edited by: Dan Lee
- Music by: Pascal Babare; Chiara Costanza
- Production companies: Sanctuary Pictures; Buffalo Media
- Distributed by: Umbrella Entertainment
- Release date: 18 October 2025 (AFF)
- Running time: 90 minutes
- Country: Australia
- Language: English

Penny Lane Is Dead is a 2025 Australian dark comedy horror thriller film written and directed by Mia'kate Russell.

== Plot ==
Set in the hot summer of 1986, the story starts with a party at a beach house, at which Penny Lane is celebrating her university acceptance with her best friends Toni and Amy. Uninvited guests arrive, a prank goes wrong, and events descend into mayhem and violence.

== Cast ==
- Alexandra Jensen as Amy
- Steve Le Marquand as Merrick
- Ben O'Toole as Angus
- Fletcher Humphrys as Rodowsky
- Bailey Spalding as Penny Lane
- Sophia Wright-Mendelsohn as Kat
- Tahlee Fereday as Toni
- Matthew O'Sullivan as Nick

== Production ==
Penny Lane Is Dead is the debut feature film by Mia'kate Russell, who writes and directs the film. Russell previously directed the horror short films Maggie May and Liz Drives, which won awards.

It is produced by Julie Ryan, Ari Harrison, Andre Luiz Lima Sampaio (Andre Lima), and Carly Maple (who also produced another 2025 film, The Fox). Cinematography is by Liam Gilmour, and the score was composed by Chiara Costanza. Dan Lee edited the film, and Erica Ockenden was production designer.

Sanctuary Pictures (its first feature film) and Buffalo Media produced, in association with Cyan Films. Major funding was provided by Screen Australia and produced in association with the South Australian Film Corporation, VicScreen, and Adelaide Film Festival.

Executive producers are Joel Anderson, John Sheedy, and Jeff Harrison.

Filming and production took place around Adelaide, including at Adelaide Studios, with post-production at Kojo Studios.

== Release ==
First footage was screened by Upgrade Productions at the Marché du Film at Cannes in May 2025.

The film premiered at the 2025 Adelaide Film Festival on Saturday 18 October, at the Piccadilly Cinema in North Adelaide, with a "pink carpet" event before the screening. Australian distribution is by Umbrella Entertainment, with Upgrade Productions responsible for international sales. It premiered in Australian cinemas on 23 July 2026.

In North America, the film premiered at the 30th Fantasia International Film Festival in Montreal, Canada, on 20 July 2026, ahead of release on Shudder in the US, on 28 August 2026.

== Reception ==
On the review aggregator website Rotten Tomatoes, 95% of 22 critics' reviews are positive, with an average rating of 7.4/10.

Velvet Winter, describing the film in an interview with Mia'Kate Russell for ABC News, wrote: "Mix together Puberty Blues and Wake in Fright, then run it through a night from hell and you'll have something that resembles Penny Lane Is Dead".

Stephen Russell of ScreenHub Australia gave the film 4 out of 5 stars, calling it "a gripping ripper". Clint Worthington of RogerEbert.com wrote that the film "bundles buckets of practical gore with a sapphic punk-horror vision as riveting as it is disquieting to watch", and gave it 2.5 stars out of 4. World of Screens gave it 3 stars out of 5, praising the performances of the four leads, but criticising a "tonal clash" in the second half.
