= Frayed (TV series) =

Australian and British television comedy-drama series

- Promotional artwork
- Genre: Comedy drama
- Created by: Sarah Kendall
- Written by: Sarah Kendall
- Directed by: Shaun Wilson; Jennifer Leacey
- Starring: Sarah Kendall; Kerry Armstrong; Matt Passmore; Ben Mingay; George Houvardas; Doris Younane; Diane Morgan; Frazer Hadfield; Maggie Ireland-Jones; Alexandra Jensen; Trystan Go; Robert Webb
- Countries of origin: Australia; United Kingdom
- Original language: English
- No. of series: 2
- No. of episodes: 12

Production
- Executive producers: Clelia Mountford; Sharon Horgan; Morwenna Gordon; Rick Kalowski; Que Minh Luu; Kevin Whyte
- Producer: Nicole O'Donohue
- Running time: 45 minutes
- Production companies: Guesswork Television; Merman Television

Original release
- Network: Sky One (series 1); Sky Max (series 2)
- Release: 26 September 2019 – 30 March 2022
- Network: ABC
- Release: 16 October 2019 – 3 November 2021

Frayed is a comedy-drama television series created by, written by, and starring Sarah Kendall. It premiered on 26 September 2019 on Sky One in the United Kingdom and on 16 October 2019 on ABC in Australia. The first six-episode series is set in 1988, in London and Newcastle, New South Wales. Kendall portrays Sammy, who is an affluent Australian-born British resident with two teenage children. After her husband dies disgracefully and leaves a bankrupt estate, Sammy returns home to live with her mother Jean (Kerry Armstrong) and younger brother Jim (Ben Mingay). She encounters former boyfriend Dan (Matt Passmore) and works for politician Chris (George Houvardas), while fending off Jim's abrasive girlfriend Bev (Doris Younane).

In February 2021, it was renewed for a second series, which premiered on 29 September 2021 on ABC in Australia and on 23 February 2022 on Sky Max in the UK, following the shutdown of Sky One. The six-episode second series is set in 1989 and has Sammy briefly return to London to try to recover her former home from a corrupt probate lawyer. However, she must return, with her children, to Newcastle to answer questions about the disappearance of a policeman. In November 2023, it was cancelled after two series.

== Plot ==
The first series is set in 1988 and follows the story of Sammy, a wealthy housewife in London. She is forced to return to her hometown of Newcastle in Australia after the disgraceful death of her husband Nick, when she is told his accumulated debts leave her almost penniless. Sammy returns to Newcastle 20 years after leaving, with her privately educated teenage son Lenny and daughter Tess, who have never visited Australia before. The children learn their mother has lied about her previous life. All three move into Sammy's childhood beachfront home with her mother Jean, a recovering alcoholic and infantile brother Jim. Sammy seeks work from local politician and former schoolmate Chris as the kids attend the local high school. Her children are bullied but eventually gain support and friendship from Abby and Bo.

Sammy revisits her past and the events, which led her to fleeing the town as a teenager. Her former boyfriend Dan teaches sport to her children and is bitter at having been deserted. She meets Jim's sometime girlfriend Bev, who schemes to take over Jean's home. After encountering other former schoolmates, Sammy realises that everyone in her hometown hates her and she tries to get back to London, but finds numerous personal and financial obstacles. Tess and Lenny protect neighbour Abby from her emotionally and physically abusive father Terry, who is a policeman.

Series Two sees the family briefly returning to London in 1989, but in very reduced circumstances. Sammy tries to prove her lawyer Rufus swindled her on settling Nick's estate – Rufus now resides in her grand house. Both Lenny and Tess want to return to Australia. Sammy's new lawyer recovers the house but diverts it to a charity. Back in Newcastle, the accidental killing of Terry in Jean's house is investigated by an under-resourced pair of police officers, Fairbank and Emily. Bev is pregnant and Jim believes its his baby. Police interview Jean, Jim and Bev but receive conflicting stories. Sammy is recalled to Australia to answer questions about Terry's disappearance. Upon their return, Lenny and Tess find it difficult to reconnect with Bo and Abby – all of them have changed.

== Cast and characters ==
Credits:

=== Main ===
- Sarah Kendall as Simone Burbeck née Samantha "Sammy" Cooper: Jean's daughter, Jim's sister, mother of Lenny and Tess; wealthy socialite living in London; becomes bankrupted after husband Nick's death; returns to mother's home in Newcastle, New South Wales; takes job as Chris' secretary. Returns to London to try to get her home back; recalled to Newcastle to answer questions over Terry's disappearance.
- Kerry Armstrong as Jean Cooper, Sammy and Jim's mother; widowed after husband Frank's drowning; recovering alcoholic.
- Matt Passmore as Dan Atkins: former champion amateur surfer, Sammy's ex-boyfriend; shattered after Sammy left; imprisoned for theft; became Physical Education teacher; Trish's boyfriend.
- Ben Mingay as Jim Cooper, Jean's son, lives at home; runs driving school; becomes Bev's love interest; delivers Bev's baby; still wants to raise child after learning its not his.
- George Houvardas as Chris George né Christos Georgiades: Steve and Wade's father; independent local member of parliament (MP); boss of Fiona and Sammy; divorces Ruth; becomes Sandy's lover.
- Doris Younane as Beverley "Bev" Spray: local criminal, becomes Jim's love interest; tries to take-over Cooper residence; convinces Sammy to return to London; becomes pregnant; resumes romance with Jim after having her baby.
- Diane Morgan as Fiona: Chris' secretary; collaborates with Sammy; becomes Fairbank's love interest.
- Frazer Hadfield as Leonard "Lenny" Burbeck: Sammy's son; bullied at Newcastle school; befriends Bo and Abby.
- Maggie Ireland-Jones as Tess Burbeck: Sammy's daughter; initially bullied by Abby, but eventually befriends her; adopts goth style.
- Alexandra Jensen as Abby Harris: Terry's daughter; Scott's love interest; befriends Tess and Lenny.
- Trystan Go as Bo: bullied at school; Lenny's school mate.
- Robert Webb as Rufus Fenshaw: corrupt probate lawyer; partner in prestigious London firm.

=== Supporting ===
- Christopher Stollery as Terry Harris: father of Abby; policeman; Coopers' neighbour; disappears.
- Maggie Dence as Mrs Atkins: Dan's mother, has dementia: believes Dan's dating Sammy; placed in aged care.
- Pippa Grandison as Trish: school receptionist; Dan's girlfriend.
- Hamish Michael as Darren Fairbank: plain-clothes detective sergeant; investigates Terry's disappearance; demoted to constable.
- Jane Hall as Sandy McIntyre: Newcastle Tribune reporter, George's new love interest.
- Emma Harvie as Emily Sutherland: police constable; works with Fairbank on Terry's disappearance.
- Georgina Symes as Deanne Harris: Terry's wife, Abby's mother, Coopers' neighbour.
- Gemma Whelan as Hannah: Sammy's new lawyer; puts money from house sale into charity.
- Dalip Sondhi as Peter: dates Jean.
- Joshua McElroy as Scott Drummond: Abby's secret boyfriend; they separate.
- Kerry Godliman as Bambi/Bunny: London prostitute.
- Susan Prior as Ruth George née Nelligan: Chris' wife; Steve and Wade's mother; Sammy's former school mate.
- Challito Browne as Wade: Chris and Ruth's son; bullies Lenny and Bo.
- Lukas Whiting as Jude: Scott's older brother.
- Ted Wilson as Duncan: parking inspector, dates Bev.
- Gareth Davies as Aaron Gideon King: Alcoholics Anonymous moderator, Bev's cousin.
- Tina Bursill as Cathy Pascall: Jean's long-estranged former friend.
- Shaun Anthony Robinson as Dean Farrell: runs fast food van.
- Sarah Aubrey as Mrs Porter

== Episodes ==
Series	Episodes	Originally released	
Series	Episodes	First released	Last released
1	6	26 September 2019 (UK); 16 October 2019 (AU)	31 October 2019 (UK); 20 November 2019 (AU)
2	6	29 September 2021 (AU); 23 February 2022 (UK)	3 November 2021 (AU); 30 March 2022 (UK)

=== Season 1 (2019) ===
No. overall	No. in series	Title	Directed by	Written by	Original release date	Viewers (millions)
1	1	"Episode 1"	Shaun Wilson	Sarah Kendall	26 September 2019 (UK) 16 October 2019 (AU)	0.155 (UK) 0.440 (AU)
London 1988: Simone drives to hospital. Nick has died after becoming drunk and drugged while having sex with Bambi. Simone arrives at her children's school; she's due to speak at assembly. Simone tells Leonard and Tess that everything will be alright. Rufus informs Simone of Nick's corporate fraud and financial mismanagement. Nick's estate is bankrupt; they have to sell everything off to clear debts. Leonard and Tess are bullied as the whole school has learnt of Nick's disgraceful death. Simone attacks Eleanor, who revealed those details. Simone, with her children, returns to Newcastle; they move in with Jean and Jim. Lenny and Tess learn Sammy has been lying to them about her history. Jean admits to being a recovering alcoholic. Jean does not believe Sammy's lies about Nick's estate. Bev eats breakfast as Jim introduces himself to Sammy's children. Jean takes children shopping for uniforms. Sammy goes job hunting. Lenny and Tess meet Abby, Terry and Deanne. Sammy meets Fiona while waiting for job interview. Sammy finds out Christos is the MP. They reminisce about their previous history. Chris drives Sammy; he picks up Wade from rugby training. Dan sees Sammy with Chris.
2	2	"Episode 2"	Shaun Wilson	Sarah Kendall	3 October 2019 (UK) 23 October 2019 (AU)	0.147 (UK) 0.374 (AU)
Sammy phones Rufus constantly; he's found a house buyer but she must sell quickly as Inland Revenue are investigating. Jim shows Sammy and Jean the excessive phone costs of Sammy's calls to London. Jean meets Peter at the beach. Tess and Lenny's first day of school is a disaster. Lenny bullied by Wade; Tess vomits during sport. Lenny meets Bo. Sammy collects Tess from school; she seeks reconciliation with Dan but he rebuffs her. Jean resists her alcohol addiction. Bev and Jim have sex. Bev convinces Jim that Sammy's scheming for his family home. Chris orders Sammy to undertake strenuous work clearing a vacant lot. She has to finish on Saturday; Fiona helps her. Jim questions Lenny about Sammy's finances. Jim realises they both lost their dad at the same age. Bev orders Jimmy not to empathise with Lenny. Jean makes a date with Peter. Chris humiliates Sammy in front of Ruth and their former school mates. Sammy visits Dan's mother. Trisha becomes annoyed by Sammy's interruption. Dan berates Sammy for deserting him. They argue about her teen pregnancy; she had an abortion. She punches Dan's caravan window; Dan bandages her hand. Rufus buys Simone's London home for himself.
3	3	"Episode 3"	Shaun Wilson	Sarah Kendall	10 October 2019 (UK) 30 October 2019 (AU)	0.311 (AU)
Bev and Jim have sex. Bev plots to phone London from rich people's homes. Sammy and Dan argue about their past. Jean tells her children of her impending date. Jim and Sammy squabble. Abby teases Tess, who responds with humour. Lenny and Bo bond while hiding from bullies. Abby targets Tess during sport; Dan targets Abby instead. Fiona explains to Sammy how Chris accepts bribes from businesses. Bo and Lenny ask Jim about attracting girls. Tess asks Jean why Sammy left home. Jean explains it was the right decision, at the time. Sammy agrees to accompany Chris on his business trip. Terry queries Tess about her afternoon; Tess lies that she did homework with Abby. Jim and children play; they find Frank's old air rifles. Sammy castigates Tess for lying; Jim calls Sammy hypocritical. Bev, pretending to be Sammy's associate, obtains Rufus' home phone number. Jim and Bev break up. Sammy sees Dan's mother wandering and leads her home. Dan had called police. Jean and Peter have an awkward date. Abby thanks Tess for her lying. Tess asks to be left alone. Peter follows Jean outside, they reconcile. Jean arrives while Sammy and Jim argue; she ignores them: they are flabbergasted.
4	4	"Episode 4"	Shaun Wilson	Sarah Kendall	17 October 2019 (UK) 6 November 2019 (AU)	0.333 (AU)
At Bev's flat block, Jim annoys other residents. Bev rebuffs Jim: she's dating Duncan. Sammy consults Fiona about blackmailing Chris. Sammy and Jim annoy each other, Jean laughs at their behaviour. Chris collects Sammy for their trip. Abby asks Tess to help with homework. Chris has Sammy pretend to be British business investor. When she vomits in his car, Chris makes Sammy sit in the back. Jim tries to win Bev back. Chris pays Sammy to get a do-over. Lenny tries talking to Abby when she arrives to study. Sammy attends Chris' meeting using her upper class accent. Chris pleased meeting went well. He leaves Sammy to attend another meeting. Instead of studying, Abby meets up with Scott. At the hotel, barman accuses Sammy of soliciting, after presenting her room key she is given free drinks for the insult. Lenny tries to help Jim work on Frank's Bentley but Jim confronts Lenny for loss of Bev. Bo defends Lenny. Tess derides Abby for using her to access Scott. Sammy empathises with Chris' concern for Steve. Chris pays off disgruntled casino patron. To recompense, Sammy gives Chris a hand job. Sammy pays off Jim with money left over.
5	5	"Episode 5"	Jennifer Leacey	Sarah Kendall	24 October 2019 (UK) 13 November 2019 (AU)	0.368 (AU)
Rufus sold off all of Nick's assets; Simone's bankrupt. To impress Ruth, Sammy agrees to supervise school dance. Learner driver Lynne convinces Jim to phone Rufus. Abby's grades improve. Lenny and Bo ask if Abby and Tess are attending dance. Jean introduces Peter to her friends. Bo teaches Lenny dance moves. Abby helps Tess to dress up. Sammy drives children to dance. While supervising, Sammy and Dan reminisce about their teen romance. When Jim phones Rufus, the lawyer believes it's his friend's prank call. Rufus hangs up again. Simone's lost luggage finally arrives. Jim breaks into her bags. Abby and friends smoke marijuana. Instead of supervising students, Dan and Sammy smoke confiscated marijuana. Dan explains his imprisonment, while Sammy tells how Nick died. Jean and Peter have another date. Jean's annoyed that Peter sees other women. Dan and Sammy have sex on Bentley's backseat. Wade and Lenny fight on dance floor. When Sammy arrives, Ruth blames Lenny for fight. Sammy defends Lenny; takes children home. Chris becomes jealous when he learns Sammy and Dan were together. Peter's phone call interrupts Sammy and Jim's arguments; Jean needs help. They bring inebriated Jean home. Sammy learns Rufus lives in her house.
6	6	"Episode 6"	Jennifer Leacey	Sarah Kendall	31 October 2019 (UK) 20 November 2019 (AU)	0.319 (AU)
Sammy accuses Rufus of stealing her home. Rufus scoffs at her; no hope against London's biggest law firm. Wade teases and hits Lenny. Bo hits Wade with shoe. Duncan fines Jim for illegal parking. Fiona advises Jim how to handle Bev. Sammy asks Chris for money; Chris says to ask Dan. Dan phones Sammy about Lenny's injury. Jim convinces Bev to get Sammy to return to London. Tess sees Abby's been hit. Bev phones Rufus, then pretends having a conversation. Bev tells Sammy to return immediately. Jim and Bev reconcile. Sammy gives jewellery to Bev to sell for airfares. Tess confronts Scott over Abby's abuse. He realises it was Terry. Tess returns home. Sammy tells Jean about returning to London. Jean apologises for over-relying on Sammy during Jim's childhood. Sammy rails at Chris prior to quitting. Bev admits to Jim that she faked conversation. Jean apologises to Peter; breaks up with him. Sammy informs Dan she's returning to London. Sammy tells Trish about having sex with Dan. Terry looks for Abby at Jean's home. Tess runs to Scott's; retrieves Abby. Abby points air rifle at Terry. When Sammy gets home, Terry lies dead. Jean arrives later; place has been cleaned.

=== Season 2 (2021) ===
No. overall	No. in series	Title	Directed by	Written by	Original release date	Viewers (millions)
7	1	"Episode 1"	Shaun Wilson	Sarah Kendall	29 September 2021 (AU) 23 February 2022 (UK)	0.252 (AU)
Sammy confronts Rufus about stealing her house; she's escorted away by police. Hannah informs Sammy she has no chance of winning. Jim gives Bo driving lesson. Fairbank interviewed by superiors regarding extending Terry's investigation: he gains a further week. Jim rails at Bo's driving. Jim misses Sammy and her children. He sees heavily pregnant Bev; asks if he's the father. Fairbank tells Emily they have to solve Terry's disappearance. Sammy accosted by landlady: rent overdue. Lenny misses Abby. Abby's counsellor encourages her to open up about her feelings. Abby wants scholarship to leave town. Chris promotes gambling at casino. Fairbank gives oral sex to Fiona. Fiona encourages Fairbank to continue his investigation. Both Lenny and Tess are disgruntled at poor living conditions. Lenny relives killing Terry. Sammy confiscates Tess' cigarettes. Hannah informs Sammy that Rufus is being investigated for tax fraud; Sammy's case more likely to win. Fairbank orders Emily they are re-interviewing witnesses. Deanne informs Fairbank that no one would dare hate Terry. Emily tells Fairbank that Jean's husband went missing, too. Lenny writes letters to Abby; he wants to return to Australia. Sammy fired for stealing from customers. Flashback: Sammy cleans up blood around Terry's corpse.
8	2	"Episode 2"	Shaun Wilson	Sarah Kendall	6 October 2021 (AU) 2 March 2022 (UK)	0.229 (AU)
Flashback: Jim arrives, Sammy orders children to bedroom. Sammy explains Lenny accidentally shot Terry. Jim wants no involvement. Present: Jim and Bev discuss their history. Jean queries Jim about any revelations to Bev. Police question Jean about Frank's disappearance. Jean believes Frank died by drowning while drunk. Fairbank confiscates Jim's rifle. Flashback: Sammy struggles to move corpse. Sammy explains that Lenny will not survive jail. Chris advises Sammy to prepare her strategy for handling Rufus. Present: Chris interviewed on radio about pro-gambling stance. Fiona calls radio, supporting gambling. Jean attends AA meeting; Bev enters. Aaron expels arguing Jean and Bev. Flashback: Chris advises Sammy to avoid Lenny going to prison. Jim helps Sammy. She tells children to be seen in public. Present: Fairbank returns rifle. Jim confirms he shot pigeon. Bev and Jean attend next AA. Bev reveals gambling debts. Flashback: Terry's corpse is removed. Jim describes Bev's fake conversation. Abby says goodbye to Lenny and Tess. Scott checks on Abby. Sammy tells Jean about Terry's death. Present: Chris and Sandy scheme to increase his approval rating. Jean arrives while Chris promotes gambling machines; she wins. Jean gives money to Bev provided she leaves Jim alone. Police photograph their exchange.
9	3	"Episode 3"	Shaun Wilson	Sarah Kendall	13 October 2021 (AU) 9 March 2022 (UK)	0.239 (AU)
Bambi embarrasses Sammy. Hannah has Sammy sign over her home to a charity. Fairbank asks Jean about Bev. Jean explains Bev dated Jim; Jean paid Bev's debts. Fairbank continues investigating despite superiors closing case as suspected suicide. Fiona advises Fairbank to interview Bev. Abby relives Terry's abuses. Abby frustrated by Deanne's insistence she cannot leave town. Hannah explains that the charity now owns Sammy's former home. Bev tells police she had sex with Jim on afternoon Terry disappeared. Lenny and Tess want to return to Newcastle but Sammy forbids it. Newcastle police request Sammy's return. Fiona tells Chris and Sandy about Sammy's imminent return. Jim remembers Jean's friend Cathy. Chris warns Jim and Jean that Bev told police about Jim not firing shot. Dan advises Abby to tough it out. Flashback: Sammy explains to Dan why she's leaving town, again. Present: Abby and Dan see Tess and Lenny have returned. Dan's mother, now an aged care resident, remembers Sammy confessing to hiding Terry's body. Chris orders Jim to convince Bev to change her story. Bev knees Jim in his testicles; she will not change her story. Fellow police who chat with Sammy interrupt Fairbank's interview with Sammy.
10	4	"Episode 4"	Shaun Wilson	Sarah Kendall	20 October 2021 (AU) 16 March 2022 (UK)	0.240 (AU)
Sammy reconnects with Jim. Fairbank determines Coopers are lying; he tails them. Jim and Sammy drink at pub. Deanne asks Jean for any news as Sammy's back. Jean recalls Frank's disappearance. Sammy and Jim scuffle about Bev. Lenny visits Abby but neither understands other's viewpoint. Jean cannot believe they fought when grandchildren are barely coping. Bev blackmails Jim and Sammy: establish child's school fund. Coopers tell Chris about Bev's blackmail. Jim refuses threatening Bev. Bo wants to reconnect with Lenny and Tess but they demur. Abby and Tess chat; both are different. Cathy advised Frank to leave Jean; neither could give up alcohol. When "Guy" threatens Bev, she retaliates but goes into labour. Jim drives Bev towards hospital; stops to deliver baby. Nurse informs Bev, her baby's post-term. Baby cannot be Jim's. Bev agrees to change story. Jim suggests Frances for girl's name. Jim tells Sammy about baby and Bev's change of mind. Bev tells Fairbank and Emily she had her dates messed up; Jim left to shoot pigeons. Lenny has nightmares about Terry's death. Fairbank demoted to constable, case closed. Sammy and Tess see Bev with Jim and baby. Fairbank catches Scott for vandalism. Scott compares Fairbank to Terry.
11	5	"Episode 5"	Shaun Wilson	Sarah Kendall	27 October 2021 (AU) 23 March 2022 (UK)	0.203 (AU)
Jean refuses to resolve Jim and Sammy's difficulties. Fairbank follows Scott until he answers. Jean tells Lenny that drinking alcohol deferred pain of Frank's loss but did not help long-term. Lenny sneaks out, joins Bo for binge drinking. Tess finds Bo and Lenny vomiting. Bev and Jim are proud of their drunken condition. Sammy learns Fiona's Fairbank's girlfriend. Sammy meets Sandy, resumes job with Chris. Jim updates Jean on Lenny and Bo. Sandy schemes to interview Sammy. Fairbank asks Deanne whether Terry was violent. Deanne rails against accusations. Sammy and Trish fight when trying to enrol her children. Dan sees Bo's hangover; Trish phones Bo's parents. At AA meeting Aaron tells Jean to focus on making present status better. Abby and Deanne argue about Terry's abuses, while Deanne did not defend her. Fairbank explains to Fiona how Terry battered Abby while Sammy's children protected her. Fairbank wants to pursue them. Fiona believes children should be let alone; they break up. Dan informs Lenny that confessing will destroy his entire family. Lenny and Abby decide to leave town. Fiona warns Sammy and Jim: Fairbank's pursuing the children. Chris crashes Sandy's interview with Sammy. Sammy writes messages to Chris. Earthquake affects Newcastle.
12	6	"Episode 6"	Shaun Wilson	Sarah Kendall	3 November 2021 (AU) 30 March 2022 (UK)	0.207 (AU)
TV news report shows Newcastle earthquake. Bus driver tells Lenny and Abby that buses are cancelled. Sammy drives Chris' car to Jean's home, which is badly damaged. Jean, children, Jim and Bev are okay. Jean cautions Sammy about carpark. Sammy places car over Terry's corpse amid rubble. She enters offices where Fiona's awaits aftershocks. Sammy tries to divert her but Fiona deduces Terry's buried in carpark. Fairbank looks for Fiona. She distracts Fairbank as Sammy sneaks out. Sandy coaches Chris for front-page photo. Sammy drives Fiona's car; takes Chris to aged care home. Sammy comforts Dan's mother. Sammy asks Dan to move Terry's body. Dan initially refuses but relents. Fairbank directed to aged care home. Dan searches garage for supplies. Trish diverts Dan to bedroom; Sammy collects supplies. She drives Dan to carpark. Fiona's trashing Chris' office; then leaves. Sammy and Dan struggling with Terry's corpse. Dan's mother rambles to Fairbank. In carpark, Jim and Bev arrive to help. They put Terry's corpse in Jim's boot. Chris arrives to organise concreting the carpark. Coopers take Terry's corpse to beach. Fairbank sees Chris and workmen concreting carpark. Sammy, Jim and Bev watch as Dan takes Terry's corpse out using surfboard.

== Production ==
The series was created and written by Australian comedian Sarah Kendall, who also stars in the lead role. It is produced by Nicole O'Donohue and directed by Shaun Wilson and Jennifer Leace. Merman Television's Sharon Horgan and Clelia Mountford, Guesswork Television's Kevin Whyte, and ABC's Rick Kalowski and Que Minh Luu serve as executive producers.

In February 2021, it was renewed for a second series. On 28 November 2023, Kendall confirmed that the show was cancelled after two series.

== Broadcast ==
The first series premiered on 26 September 2019 on Sky One in the United Kingdom and on 16 October on ABC in Australia. The second series premiered on 29 September 2021 on ABC TV in Australia and on 23 February 2022 on Sky Max in the UK.

== Reception ==
=== Critical reception ===
Reviews for the series have generally been mixed to positive. On Rotten Tomatoes, the first season holds a rating of 86% based on reviews from 14 critics. The website's critical consensus states: "Frayed's intentionally cringe humor may be squirm-inducing, but solid performances and a surprisingly sweet center will keep viewers watching - even if it's through their fingers."

In a review for website Chortle, Steve Bennett praised Kendall's performance, commenting that "Kendall, whose winningly dry performance is central to the show's appeal, has said she wanted to offer an alternative view of 1980s Australia than the one portrayed in the sun-soaked scenes of Neighbours and Home And Away, and she’s certainly paints a much less romantic picture." He went on to mention that "Once Frayed’s premise is finally established, it offers plenty to suggest this is worth sticking with".

In a favourable review by Steve Dessau of website Beyond the Joke praised the cast performances and he said "It's not all laughs – some of the best laughs come via pop culture gags about The Thompson Twins – but there is more than enough that is funny and intriguing here to justify setting up a series link in your schedule."

Anthony Morris of Screenhub rated the series 4 stars out of 5 as he was favourable of the opening episode, pointing out that the series gets dramedy right and that it is evident from the first episode. He said that "Frayed isn’t perfect: it slows down a lot once it hits Newcastle and Sammy (initially) is the kind of character it takes time to warm to. Almost all the characters are either angry or ditzy; eventually somebody’s going to have to have something going for them. But unlike a lot of dramedies, it seems likely the characters will be given the chance to grow. This feels more like it’s the start of a story than just setting up a situation."

In a more mediocre review from Jasper Rees of The Daily Telegraph, he criticized the first episode, stating that "[Frayed is] a pungent Eighties-set comedy that doesn’t know how far to take the joke" and gave it 3 out of 5 stars.

=== Australian ratings ===
==== Season 1 (2019) ====
No.	Title	Air date	Overnight ratings		Consolidated ratings		Total viewers	Ref(s)
No.	Title	Air date	Viewers	Rank	Viewers	Rank	Total viewers	Ref(s)
1	"Episode 1"	16 October 2019	440,000	17	118,000	12	558,000	
2	"Episode 2"	23 October 2019	374,000	19	106,000	16	480,000	
3	"Episode 3"	30 October 2019	311,000	—N/a	109,000	18	420,000	
4	"Episode 4"	6 November 2019	333,000	19	107,000	19	440,000	
5	"Episode 5"	13 November 2019	368,000	19	85,000	19	453,000	
6	"Episode 6"	20 November 2019	319,000	20	106,000	15	425,000	

==== Season 2 (2021) ====
No.	Title	Air date	Overnight ratings		Consolidated ratings		Total viewers	Ref(s)
No.	Title	Air date	Viewers	Rank	Viewers	Rank	Total viewers	Ref(s)
1	"Episode 1"	29 September 2021	252,000	—N/a	291,000	19	543,000	
2	"Episode 2"	6 October 2021	229,000	—N/a	245,000	17	474,000	
3	"Episode 3"	13 October 2021	239,000	—N/a	229,000	20	468,000	
4	"Episode 4"	20 October 2021	240,000	—N/a	227,000	20	467,000	
5	"Episode 5"	27 October 2021	203,000	—N/a	221,000	22	424,000	
6	"Episode 6"	3 November 2021	207,000	—N/a	251,000	24	458,000	

=== Awards and nominations ===
Year	Category	Association	Nominee	Result	Ref
2019	AACTA Awards	Best Television Comedy Series	Frayed	Nominated	
2019	AACTA Awards	Best Sound in Television	Mark Cornish, Ralph Ortner (episode 1)	Nominated	
2019	AACTA Awards	Best Original Music Score in Television	Bryony Marks (episode 1)	Nominated	
2019	AACTA Awards	Best Production Design in Television	Fiona Donovan (episode 1)	Nominated	
2019	AACTA Awards	Best Costume Design in Television	Nina Edwards (episode 1)	Nominated	
2020	TV Tonight Awards	TV Tonight Award for Best New Aussie Show of 2019	Frayed	Nominated	
2020	BAFTA TV Awards	Best Female Comedy Performance	Sarah Kendall	Nominated	
2020	RTS − Craft & Design Awards	Make Up Design - Entertainment & Non Drama	Sheldon Wade	Won	
2021	AACTA Awards	Best Narrative Comedy Series	Frayed	Nominated	
2021	AACTA Awards	Best Comedy Performer	Sarah Kendall	Nominated	
2021	AACTA Awards	Best Original Score in Television	Bryony Marks (episode 1)	Nominated	
2021	AACTA Awards	Best Sound in Television	Paul Finlay, Robert Sullivan, James Andrews, Dino Giacomin (episode 1)	Nominated	
2022	SPA Award	Comedy Program or Series Production of the Year	Frayed (season 2)	Nominated	
2022	TV Tonight Awards	Best Australian Comedy	Frayed	Nominated	

== International release ==
In May 2020, it was announced that Frayed had been picked up in the United States as an HBO Max exclusive. The series was released on 30 July 2020. The second season was released on HBO Max on 4 November 2021.

== Home media ==
"Frayed: Season One" was released on DVD in Australia (Region 4) on 27 November 2019 from Roadshow Entertainment and in the United Kingdom (Region 2) on 2 December 2019 via Spirit Entertainment.
