= Frayed Knights =

Video game

Frayed Knights: The Skull of S'makh-Daon
- Developer: Rampant Games
- Engine: Torque
- Platform: Windows
- Release: 2011
- Genre: RPG
- Mode: Single-player

Frayed Knights: The Skull of S'makh-Daon is a 3D RPG for Microsoft Windows created by American studio Rampant Games.

== Plot ==
From the developer's website:

In a world of jaded heroes and veteran adventurers, you play a team of misfits: Arianna, a dainty warrior with an attitude problem; Dirk, an adrenaline-junky rogue who doesn't seem to understand the word 'subtle;' Benjamin, a nature-priest and an ill-suited newcomer to the adventuring lifestyle, and Chloe, a ditsy sorceress with a love of cute, fuzzy animals and setting her enemies on fire.

== Reception ==
Frayed Knights received a 6.0/10 at GameSpot, where it was praised for its old-school style and silly humor but criticized for many other aspects, such as its poor interface and numerous bugs. The game received a 2.5/5 score at RPGamer.
