= Bloody Hell (2020 film) =

- Film poster
- Directed by: Alister Grierson
- Screenplay by: Robert Benjamin
- Produced by: Joshua Paul; Brett Thornquest; Robert Benjamin
- Starring: Ben O'Toole; Caroline Craig; Matthew Sunderland; Travis Jeffery; Jack Finsterer; Meg Fraser
- Cinematography: Brad Shield
- Edited by: Robert Benjamin; Alister Grierson
- Music by: Brian Cachia
- Production companies: Eclectik Vision; Entertainment Squad; Heart Sleeve Productions
- Distributed by: Entertainment Squad; The Horror Collective
- Release dates: 8 October 2020 (Australia); 9 October 2020 (United States)
- Running time: 93 min
- Countries: United States; Australia; Finland
- Languages: English; Finnish
- Box office: $60,283

Bloody Hell is a 2020 comedy horror film directed by Alister Grierson and written by Robert Benjamin (in his screenwriting debut). It tells the story of Rex Coen, a former U.S. soldier with a mysterious past who flees from his homeland to escape his own personal hell - to unknowingly experience something even more sinister and hellish. The film stars Ben O'Toole, Caroline Craig and Matthew Sunderland.

The film premiered in Australia on October 8, 2020, and in the United States a day later at the Nightstream Film Festival.

== Plot ==
Rex Coen (O’Toole), an American veteran, visits a bank to see a teller on whom he has a crush. While the two are flirting, a group of armed robbers storm the bank. With the help of his subconscious, which he sees as an external entity, Rex kills the group of robbers and saves everyone except one employee, Angela, who was inadvertently shot when Rex shoots a robber.

Despite his heroics, Rex is tried for the death of Angela and takes a plea deal to serve eight years in prison. After harassment from the media upon his release, he decides to vacation to Finland. Upon arriving, Rex is kidnapped by a conspicuous couple who films him in the airport. He awakens with one of his legs amputated and his hands bound to the ceiling. He works with his subconscious entity to discern that he is being held captive by a family of cannibals. The family consists of the father; the mother; the uncle; the daughter, Alia; the youngest brother, Olaf; the monstrously deformed eldest brother, Pati; and twin brothers who almost always appear wearing masks.

When he comes downstairs out of curiosity late that night, Rex takes Olaf hostage and tries to convince Alia to let him go. The noise attracts the family, and as he is threatening to kill Olaf unless he is set free, Rex's strength fails him and he drops the child. As the parents take Olaf to the hospital to treat his wounds, Alia tends to Rex, confessing that she likes him while explaining her family's ways.

Alia explains that her cannibalistic family, particularly Pati, kidnap American tourists to eat and that Rex is the latest victim. Alia is an outcast due to her non-violent tendencies and has been forced to be Pati's feeder. Driven by compassion, Alia gives Rex a knife for defense. When the family comes back, Rex kills the uncle with the knife and escapes the room. He then kills the father and both of the twins with a nailgun while Alia strangles her mother. The commotion draws out Pati, and in the ensuing struggle, Rex kills him with the sharp bone of his own amputated leg that he discovers in the family fridge.

As he and Alia escape and make plans to pick up Olaf from the hospital, Rex is praised by his subconscious entity, who realizes he is no longer needed and disappears. Alia and Rex return to America as a couple with Olaf. At a housewarming party, Alia suddenly imagines killing a guest who seems to be flirting with Rex and Olaf looks at a photo of his former family and muses aloud that it may be time for an "American banquet." In the final shot, a third brother is shown in the photo, implying the twins are actually triplets, and another member of the family is still alive.

== Cast ==
- Ben O'Toole as Rex Coen
- Caroline Craig as Mother
- Matthew Sunderland as Father
- Travis Jeffery as Gael / Gideon
- Jack Finsterer as Uncle
- Meg Fraser as Alia
- David Hill as Olli
- Joshua Brennan as Pete
- Ashlee Lollback as Maddy
- Sophia Emberson-Bain as Olivia
- Russ Gallagher as Robert Bell
- Oakley Kwon as Angela Reynolds
- Alan David Lee as William Hudson

== Release ==
Bloody Hell was selected at the 25th Bucheon International Fantastic Film Festival (BIFAN) in South Korea, held in July 2021. It was showcased in the World Fantastic Red section of the festival.

== Reception ==
On Rotten Tomatoes the film has an approval rating of 91% based on reviews from 56 critics. The site's critic consensus reads, "For genre fans in the mood to watch some darkly funny mayhem, Bloody Hell lives up to its title in all the best ways."

=== Accolades ===
Brad Shield was nominated on his work for best cinematography at the 10th AACTA Awards. At the 2021 APRA-AGSC Screen Music Awards, composer Brian Cachia won Best Film Score of the Year. It was also nominated for a Golden Trailer award for best motion poster.
