= In Limbo (TV series) =

Australian television series

- Promotional poster
- Genre: Tragicomedy; Supernatural
- Created by: Lucas Taylor
- Written by: Lucas Taylor, Tamara Asmar
- Directed by: Trent O'Donnell, David Stubbs
- Music by: Matteo Zingales
- Composer: Matteo Zingales
- Country of origin: Australia
- Original language: English
- No. of seasons: 1
- No. of episodes: 6

Production
- Executive producers: Todd Abbott, Rebecca Anderson
- Producers: Jennifer Cummins, David Jowsey, Angela Littlejohn, Greer Simpkin
- Production location: Queensland
- Editor: Chris Plummer

Original release
- Network: ABC iview
- Release: 24 May 2023

In Limbo is a comedy drama television series produced in 2023 by Bunya Productions Pty Ltd, Heiress Films Pty Ltd. In Limbo uses humour to shine a spotlight on male suicide and mental health. The first series consisted of six 30 minute episodes.

== Cast ==
- Ryan Corr as Charlie
- Bob Morley as Nate
- Emma Harvie as Freya
- Russell Dykstra as Frank
- Lena Cruz as Maria
- Aaron Fa'Aoso as Nikora
- Georgina Naidu as Shenali
- Shabana Rihani as Jay
- Philippa Northeast as Lily
- Michael Logo as Solomon
- Kamillia Rihani as Annabel
- Jane Harber as Beth
- Josh McConville as Johan
- Alex McTavish as Suzie
- Jan Nary as Nanna Grace
- Damien Thomlinson as Tommy
- Valentino D'Adderio as Young Charlie
- Oliver De Los Santos as Young Nate
- Christopher Sommers as Conrad
- Rachael Hale as Dominatrix
- Jordi Webber as Wayne
- Harry Beckwith as Bentley
- Vanessa Moltzen as Al King
- Rafferty Grierson as Flintoff
- Anita Hegh as Detective Blythe
- Jennifer Cummins as Therapist

== Episodes ==
Story	Episode	Title	Directed by	Written by	Original release date	Prod. code	Aus viewers (millions)
1	1x01	"Episode 1"	Trent O'Donnell	Lucas Taylor, Tamara Asmar	24 May 2023	1.1	tbc
2	1x02	"Episode 2"	Trent O'Donnell	Lucas Taylor, Tamara Asmar	24 May 2023	1.2	tbc
3	1x03	"Episode 3"	David Stubbs	Lucas Taylor, Tamara Asmar	24 May 2023	1.3	tbc
4	1x04	"Episode 4"	David Stubbs	Lucas Taylor, Tamara Asmar	24 May 2023	1.4	tbc
5	1x05	"Episode 5"	David Stubbs	Lucas Taylor, Tamara Asmar	24 May 2023	1.5	tbc
6	1x06	"Episode 6"	David Stubbs	Lucas Taylor, Tamara Asmar	24 May 2023	1.6	tbc

== Reception ==
"In Limbo has the pace and tone of a sitcom, but it packs an emotional punch", states Debi Enker of the Sydney Morning Herald, giving the series premier a 4/5 star rating. "It's a serious study wrapped in bright and shiny packaging." Highlighting In Limbo's more serious themes Enker concludes, "They also underline the series' assertion that men need to talk more – to each other, to their partners, to family and friends, and possibly also to health professionals – about their doubts and fears and difficulties, and not just about their pop-culture preferences."

"In Limbo entertains, engages and moves, potently so, but it's even more committed to being meaningful", wrote Sarah Ward of Concrete Playground. "It's an other worldly sitcom with an odd couple at its centre, their bond transcending life and death, and it isn't afraid of having a sense of humour".

== Awards and nominations ==
Award	Date(s) of ceremony'	Category	Recipient(s)	Result	Ref.
Screen Well Awards	October 10, 2023	Production of the year	Bunya Productions and Heiress Films	Finalist	
APRA - Screen Music Awards	November 9, 2023	Best Music for a Mini-Series or Telemovie	Matteo Zingales	Nominated	
AACTA Awards	February 10, 2024	Best Original Music Score in Television	Matteo Zingales	Nominated	
AWGIE Awards	February 15, 2024	Comedy – Situation or Narrative	Tamara Asmar for "Cremating"	Nominated	
Screen Producers Australia Awards	March 21, 2024	Comedy Program or Series Production of the Year	Bunya Productions and Heiress Films	Won	
Logies Awards	August 18, 2024	Best Scripted Comedy Program	Bunya Productions and Heiress Films	Nominated	
Logies Awards	August 18, 2024	Best Lead Actor in a Comedy	Ryan Corr	Nominated	
Logies Awards	August 18, 2024	Best Lead Actor in a Comedy	Bob Morley	Nominated	
