= Yehuda Talit =

Israeli businessman (1944–2019)

- יהודה טלית
- Born: 2 December 1944; Tel Aviv, Palestine
- Died: 8 June 2019 (aged 74); Herzliya, Israel
- Occupation(s): Businessman, record producer, talent agent

Yehuda Talit (Hebrew: יהודה טלית; 2 December 1944 – 8 June 2019) was an Israeli businessman, record producer and talent agent. He was a prominent figure in the Israeli entertainment industry, known for bringing international artists to Israel and producing large-scale concerts and theatrical productions. Talit founded Talit Productions in 1977, which became a significant player in the Israeli music and entertainment scene. He later expanded into television, founding Talit Communications in 1997 and partnering in various broadcasting ventures, including buying the rights of representation for the French channel, TV5, and established the baby channel, Baby TV.

== Biography ==
=== Childhood, teenage years and early career stages ===
Talit was born in Tel Aviv, where he studied at Balfour Elementary School and later at the Agricultural High School at Mikve Israel. He first stepped into the business world with the production, promotion and selling of key chains with celebrity portraits imprinted on them, which were very popular during the 1960s.

=== A producer and an agent ===
In 1966, Talit met Haim Saban, who was a member of "The Lions" band. Talit offered Saban to sell key chains with The Lions’ portraits, a move which was their first business partnership. The two of them went on and established a company that represented The Lions and other known Israeli performers of that time like Arik Einstein and The Churchills.

In 1977, Talit founded "Talit Productions". During the 1980s, the company produced large concerts and brought international artists to Israel such as Bob Dylan, Tracy Chapman, Dire Straits, Sting, Leonard Cohen, Billy Joel, Boy George, Bryan Adams, Joe Cocker, Julio Iglesias, Duran Duran, David Bowie, The Eurythmics and many others. The company also initiated a line of Opera productions, Musicals, theater shows and sport events. The most prominent of them were The Bolshoy Theater, 42nd Street, Walt Disney’s World on Ice and the Harlem Globetrotters.

Among other things, Talit was also responsible for the Night of Love performance, which was held in Tzemach, on the banks of the Sea of Galilee, The Magician, a musical based on The Wizard of Oz, which ran since 1994 and had more than 600 shows. During the past few years, Talit has been responsible in a joint production with the Beit Lesin Theater in Israel, for the hit one man show starring Avi Kushnir, Returning the Cave Man.

At the same time, the company has represented many artists and Israeli performers from Kaveret and Shalom Hanoch to Avi Kushnir and Danny Sanderson. Some of them still represented by the agency until this day.

=== The TV business ===
In 1997, Talit expanded his company when he got into the television business and founded "Talit Communications", which later became "Talit Productions" founder. At the same time, he joined a business partnership with Ron Isaac and founded "Iguana Productions". In 1998, a year later, Talit added the broadcast rights for FTV. In 1999, together with Tamira Yardeni and Haim Slotzki, he founded "Synergy Communications", which went on to win the rights to operate the Israeli Satellite Channel of YTV. Talit also started a co partnership with EM.TV, the German content giant, which brought to the Israeli television children's classics like Maya the Bee, The Muppet Show, Marco, Pinocchio, Niles Holgerson and Pippi Longstocking.

Although Talit sold half of the Talit group to the same German company a few years later, he bought back all of it from EM. TV.

In 2000, Talit created yet another partnership with Jim Hanson's production company and reserved the Israeli rights for The Muppet Show. A year later, Talit went into sports with his Group Channel that broadcast the games of Maccabi Haifa and Manchester United.

In 2003, Talit got the rights of representation for the French channel, TV5, and established the baby channel, Baby TV. In 2007 Fox Broadcasting Company purchased 50% of the ownership of the baby channel from the European firm holding the rights to the channel. Two years later Talit received the broadcast rights for the National Geographic Channel in Israel. Today "Talit Communications" owns and represents 20 channels broadcast in Israel.

=== Personal life and death ===
Talit lived in Herzliya with his wife Batia. He had three children: Liran, who is currently residing in Israel, Liat and Elinor who work at “Talit Communications” in Israel.

Talit died of cancer on 8 June 2019 in Herzliya, at age 74.
