= Mr. Men and Little Miss =

Animated television series

- Also known as: Monsieur Bonhomme
- Genre: Cartoon series Children's television series
- Created by: Roger Hargreaves
- Voices of: Geoffrey Palmer; Gordon Peters; Jill Shilling; Jimmy Hibbert; Scott Charles
- Composer: David Timsit
- Countries of origin: United Kingdom; France
- Original language: English
- No. of seasons: 3
- No. of episodes: 104 (plus 3 specials)

Production
- Running time: 5 minutes
- Production companies: Marina Productions; Flicks Films; Mr. Films

Original release
- Network: France 3 (France); ITV (CITV) (UK)
- Release: 5 September 1995 – 8 September 1997

Related
- Mr. Men (1974–1978); Little Miss (1983); The Mr. Men Show (1997–1999); Timbuctoo (1998–1999); The Mr. Men Show (2008–2009); Mr. Men Little Miss Mini Adventures (2025–present)

Mr. Men and Little Miss (known in the United States as The Mr. Men Show and in France as Monsieur Bonhomme) is a 1995 animated children's television series based on the original Mr. Men and Little Miss books created in the 1970s and 1980s by British author Roger Hargreaves and continued by his son Adam Hargreaves. The series was a co-production between Marina Productions and France 3 and aired on CITV in the United Kingdom (later reairing on Nickelodeon, Nick Jr. and Channel 5) and France 3 in France.

== Episodes ==
=== Pilot ===
The show was originally aired on Children's ITV in the UK, from 5th September 1995 to 8th September 1997 (later reairing on Nickelodeon, Nick Jr. and Channel 5's Milkshake! morning programming block) and France 3 in France.

In the UK, the show was narrated by Gordon Peters. In North America, the show was narrated by Ron Rubin. While the show has been released several DVDs in the UK, there has never been a home video release of the North American version.

The Mr. Men Show (North American version)

This cartoon aired in the US and Canada in from September 15, 1997 to September 1, 2000. The voice directors are Susan Roman and Tracey Moore for Optimum Productions. This TV show was originally aired on YTV, CBC and TVOntario in Canada as well as on standalone program on It's Itsy Bitsy Time. It's also been said to have been aired in syndication in the United States on various UPN affiliates and channels such as HBO and PBS. It was produced by Breakthrough Entertainment and Telegenic Programs.

No. overall	No. in season	Title	Original release date
1	1	"Little Miss Splendid's Gift"	21 August 1994

=== Series 1 (1995) ===
No. overall	No. in season	Title	Original release date
2	1	"The Joke is on Little Miss Naughty"	5 September 1995
3	2	"Hurry Mr. Rush... Autumn is Coming!"	8 September 1995
4	3	"One Day in the Life of Mr. Perfect"	16 October 1995
5	4	"Mr. Uppity's Big House"	27 October 1995
6	5	"Little Miss Busy Takes a Break"	30 October 1995
7	6	"Mr. Mischief is Caught at His Own Game"	17 November 1995
8	7	"Little Miss Tidy Loses a Friend"	20 November 1995
9	8	"Mr. Funny Puts on a Show"	15 December 1995
10	9	"An Unforgettable Sunday for Miss Tiny"	21 December 1995
11	10	"Mr. Chatterbox Loses His Voice"	25 December 1995
12	11	"He... Hello Little Miss Shy"	27 December 1995
13	12	"An Invitation for Mr. Messy"	31 December 1995

=== Series 2 (1996) ===
No. overall	No. in season	Title	Original release date
14	1	"Mr. Bump Goes on a Trip"	14 January 1996
15	2	"Mr. Dizzy Goes Doggy—sitting"	23 January 1996
16	3	"What a Choice for Little Miss Fickle!"	30 January 1996
17	4	"Happy Christmas Mr. Worry"	10 February 1996
18	5	"Mr. Nosey Solves a Mystery"	12 February 1996
19	6	"No Food is No Fun for Mr. Greedy"	17 February 1996
20	7	"A Special Friend for Little Miss Lucky"	20 February 1996
21	8	"Mr. Daydream Talks to the Stars"	25 February 1996
22	9	"That's Enough, Little Miss Bossy"	29 February 1996
23	10	"Mr. Forgetful... Hey Waiter!"	7 March 1996
24	11	"Mr. Jelly's Show of Bravery"	9 March 1996
25	12	"Mr. Strong: King of the Circus"	11 March 1996
26	13	"Mr. Nonsense Rows to the Moon"	14 March 1996
27	14	"Little Miss Sunshine Brings a Smile"	15 March 1996
28	15	"Mr. Fussy Takes a Well—Earned Break"	15 March 1996
29	16	"Mr. Clumsy in the Brains and the Brawn"	15 March 1996
30	17	"Mr. Brave Goes Ghost Hunting"	19 March 1996
31	18	"Isn't Little Miss Trouble Kind..."	19 March 1996
32	19	"A Week—End with Little Miss Contrary"	19 March 1996
33	20	"Golly, Mr. Grumpy's Smiling"	21 March 1996
34	21	"Mr. Lazy Can't Sleep Anymore"	21 March 1996
35	22	"Mr. Small's Big Dream"	21 March 1996
36	23	"Mr. Bounce Finds Paradise"	23 March 1996
37	24	"What a Question, Little Miss Curious!"	23 March 1996
38	25	"Little Miss Stubborn Goes Right to the Bitter End"	23 March 1996
39	26	"Little Miss Greedy... Belle of the Ball"	25 March 1996
40	27	"Mr. Tickle Saves the Day"	25 March 1996
41	28	"Little Miss Wise's Crazy Day!"	25 March 1996
42	29	"A Rival for Little Miss Somersault"	28 March 1996
43	30	"Little Miss Star, the Leading Witness"	28 March 1996
44	31	"Little Miss Late Beats Them All!"	28 March 1996
45	32	"Mr. Skinny is Up the Spout"	31 March 1996
46	33	"That's Gratitude, Mr. Uppity!"	31 March 1996
47	34	"Little Miss Neat Sees Spots"	31 March 1996
48	35	"Mr. Grumble Boils Over"	31 March 1996

=== Series 3 (1997) ===
No. overall	No. in season	Title	Original release date
49	1	"Another Victory for Little Miss Splendid"	2 January 1997
50	2	"A Surprise for Mr. Tall"	2 January 1997
51	3	"Mr. Cheerful Doffs His Hat"	2 January 1997
52	4	"Little Miss Scatterbrain Puts Everything in Turmoil"	14 January 1997
53	5	"A Very Happy Day for Mr. Happy"	14 January 1997
54	6	"Mr. Clever's Daft Bet"	14 January 1997
55	7	"What a Mess, Little Miss Helpful!"	17 January 1997
56	8	"Little Miss Tidy and the Winning Ticket"	17 January 1997
57	9	"Mr. Dizzy Promises the Moon"	17 January 1997
58	10	"Mr. Forgetful, the World's Best Actor!"	20 January 1997
59	11	"[ Mr. Busy ]Hello, Pizza Express?"	20 January 1997
60	12	"Mr. Clumsy, Head Butler"	20 January 1997
61	13	"Mr. Impossible's Lesson"	24 January 1997
62	14	"Little Miss Star Goes to Jollywood"	31 January 1997
63	15	"Mr. Clever's Invention"	3 February 1997
64	16	"Little Miss Chatterbox Finds her Calling"	3 February 1997
65	17	"Mr. Skinny's Incredible Bet"	3 February 1997
66	18	"A Job for Little Miss Giggles"	3 February 1997
67	19	"Little Miss Busy, D.I.Y Teacher"	3 February 1997
68	20	"Little Miss Chatterbox Goes to Sea—Town"	7 February 1997
69	21	"Mr. Lazy Takes an Afternoon Nap"	7 February 1997
70	22	"Mr. Brave vs. Koko the Gorilla"	7 February 1997
71	23	"Little Miss Naughty Goes Skiing"	8 February 1997
72	24	"Little Miss Dotty Goes to Home Farm"	16 February 1997
73	25	"Mr. Nonsense's Strange Illness"	4 March 1997
74	26	"Mr. Mean Hasn't a Penny Left"	15 March 1997
75	27	"Little Miss Wise's Day Out at the Fun Fair"	3 September 1997
76	28	"Mr. Grumble's Holiday"	3 September 1997
77	29	"Little Miss Greedy's Strange Illness"	3 September 1997
78	30	"Mr. Slow Takes the Lead"	3 September 1997
79	31	"Mr. Strong Makes a Big Splash"	3 September 1997
80	32	"Mr. Perfect Goes West"	3 September 1997
81	33	"Little Miss Magic to the Rescue"	3 September 1997
82	34	"Mr. Silly's Silly Secret"	3 September 1997
83	35	"Mr. Chatterbox and the Parrot"	3 September 1997
84	36	"Little Miss Late Finally Catches Up"	3 September 1997
85	37	"Mr. Noisy, the Music Man"	3 September 1997
86	38	"Mr. Muddle Goes Skating"	3 September 1997
87	39	"Little Miss Helpful Goes to the Fair"	4 September 1997
88	40	"Mr. Worry and the Giant"	4 September 1997
89	41	"Mr. Greedy Goes to a Dinner Party"	4 September 1997
90	42	"Little Miss Bossy Has a Busy Day"	4 September 1997
91	43	"Mr. Bump Has an Accident"	4 September 1997
92	44	"Mr. Small Finds a Job"	4 September 1997
93	45	"Mr. Nosey Goes Fishing"	4 September 1997
94	46	"Little Miss Trouble and the Magic Paint"	4 September 1997
95	47	"It's Very Noisy for Mr. Quiet"	5 September 1997
96	48	"Mr. Mischief Becomes an Artist"	5 September 1997
97	49	"Lunch with Little Miss Tiny"	5 September 1997
98	50	"Mr. Clever Flies His Kite"	5 September 1997
99	51	"Thank Goodness for Mr. Slow"	5 September 1997
100	52	"Little Miss Shy Goes to the Fair"	5 September 1997
101	53	"A New House for Mr. Wrong"	5 September 1997
102	54	"Happy Birthday Little Miss Scatterbrain"	6 September 1997
103	55	"Mr. Jelly Goes Time—Traveling"	7 September 1997
104	56	"A Big Surprise for Mr. Mean"	8 September 1997

=== Christmas specials ===
No.	Title	Original release date
1	"Christmas Rescue (a.k.a. "Mr. Men, Little Misses")"	15 December 1991
2	"The Christmas Letter"	7 December 1998

=== Educational special ===
Title	Original release date
"The Great Alphabet Hunt"	3 August 1992

== Voices ==
=== British voices ===
Voice	Character
Geoffrey Palmer	Narrator and Santa Claus (In The Christmas Letter)
Gordon Peters	Narrator, Mr. Tickle, Mr. Greedy, Mr. Happy, Mr. Nosey, Mr. Sneeze, Mr. Bump, Mr. Snow, Mr. Messy, Mr. Topsy-Turvy, Mr. Silly, Mr. Uppity, Mr. Small, Mr. Daydream, Mr. Forgetful, Mr. Jelly, Mr. Noisy, Mr. Lazy, Mr. Funny, Mr. Mean, Mr. Chatterbox, Mr. Fussy, Mr. Bounce, Mr. Muddle, Mr. Dizzy, Mr. Impossible, Mr. Strong, Mr. Grumpy, Mr. Clumsy, Mr. Quiet, Mr. Rush, Mr. Tall, Mr. Worry, Mr. Nonsense, Mr. Wrong, Mr. Skinny, Mr. Mischief, Mr. Clever, Mr. Busy, Mr. Slow, Mr. Brave, Mr. Grumble, Mr. Perfect, Mr. Cheerful, and Additional Voices
Jill Shilling	Little Miss Bossy, Little Miss Naughty, Little Miss Neat, Little Miss Sunshine, Little Miss Tiny, Little Miss Trouble, Little Miss Helpful, Little Miss Magic, Little Miss Shy, Little Miss Splendid, Little Miss Late, Little Miss Scatterbrain, Little Miss Greedy, Little Miss Giggles, Little Miss Twins, Little Miss Chatterbox, Little Miss Dotty, Little Miss Lucky, Little Miss Star, Little Miss Fickle, Little Miss Contrary, Little Miss Busy, Little Miss Wise, Little Miss Tidy, Little Miss Brainy, Little Miss Stubborn, Little Miss Curious, Little Miss Fun, Little Miss Somersault, Little Miss Prim, and Additional Voices
Scott Charles	Jack (In The Christmas Letter)
Jimmy Hibbert	Title Card Narrator (Various episodes)

=== American voices ===
Voice	Character
Ron Rubin	Narrator, Mr. Happy, Mr. Nosey, Mr. Daydream, Mr. Forgetful, Mr. Jelly, Mr. Noisy, Mr. Mean, Mr. Dizzy, Mr. Tall, Mr. Wrong, Mr. Mischief, and Additional Voices
Len Carlson	Mr. Tickle, Mr. Greedy, Mr. Sneeze, Mr. Messy, Mr. Uppity, Mr. Funny, Mr. Chatterbox, Mr. Fussy, Mr. Bounce, Mr. Strong, Mr. Grumpy, Mr. Quiet, Mr. Nonsense, Mr. Skinny, Mr. Clever, Mr. Slow, Mr. Perfect, Mr. Cheerful, and Additional Voices
Neil Crone	Mr. Bump, Mr. Messy, Mr. Topsy-Turvy, Mr. Silly, Mr. Small, Mr. Lazy, Mr. Impossible, Mr. Clumsy, Mr. Rush, Mr. Worry, Mr. Busy, Mr. Brave, Mr. Grumble, and Additional Voices
Judy Marshak	Little Miss Bossy, Little Miss Brilliant, Little Miss Scatterbrain, Little Miss Greedy, Little Miss Dotty, Little Miss Star, Little Miss Contrary, and Additional Voices
Alyson Court	Little Miss Sunshine, Little Miss Trouble, Little Miss Magic, Little Miss Shy, Little Miss Late, Little Miss Giggles, Little Miss Chatterbox, Little Miss Fickle, Little Miss Busy, Little Miss Wise, Little Miss Tidy, Little Miss Prim, and Additional Voices
Catherine Disher	Mr. Muddle, Little Miss Naughty, Little Miss Neat, Little Miss Tiny, Little Miss Helpful, Little Miss Splendid, Little Miss Twins, Little Miss Lucky, Little Miss Brainy, Little Miss Stubborn, Little Miss Curious, Little Miss Fun, Little Miss Somersault, and Additional Voices

=== Greek voices ===
Voice	Character
Giannis Stefopoulos	Narrator and Additional Voices
Alexandra Lerta	Little Miss Shy, Little Miss Tiny and Various Voices
Dimitris Milonas	Various Voices
Voula Kosta	Various Voices
Nikos Papadopoulos
Tasos Kostis	Narrator and Various Voices
Rania Ioannidou	Various Voices
Katerina Girgis	Various Voices
Vasilis Kailas	Various Voices

=== French voices ===
Voice	Character
Roger Carel	Various Voices
Patricia Legrand	Various Voices
Danièle Hazan	Various Voices
