= The Mr. Men Show (1997 TV series) =

- Created by: Roger Hargreaves
- Countries of origin: Canada; United States
- Original language: English
- No. of seasons: 1
- No. of episodes: 39 regular episodes; 1 special

Production
- Executive producer: Adam Hargreaves
- Running time: 30 minutes
- Production companies: Breakthrough Films and Television; Telegenic Programs; Marina Productions; Lacey Entertainment

Original release
- Network: Syndication
- Release: September 15, 1997 – June 6, 1999

Related
- Mr. Men (1974–1978); Little Miss (1983); Mr. Men and Little Miss (1995–1998); Timbuctoo (1998–1999); The Mr. Men Show (2008–2009); Mr. Men Little Miss Mini Adventures (2025–present)

The Mr. Men Show is a remake of the British animated series, Mr. Men and Little Miss. It is virtually identical to the original British version, apart from added live-action skits, actors and actresses, theme song, and credits. Its original airing was in Canada, and it aired in the United States starting in the fall of 1997, being syndicated by The Summit Media Group.

The re-dubbed episodes of Mr. Men and Little Miss later appeared on their own on Cartoon Network's preschool-aimed program Small World, which showcased animation from around the world, albeit with the intro and end credits completely removed.

== About ==
While being an adaption, the series also featured live-action skits starring characters called "The Mr. Men Players", including the News Lady (with her sophisticated British accent), the Game Show Guy, a carpenter with his assistant, and a mad scientist with her assistant, among others.

== Development ==
In Late-1996, 4Kids Entertainment announced they had secured a licensing deal with Marina Productions to secure the U.S. programming and merchandising rights for Mr. Men and Little Miss, with subsidiary Leisure Concepts, Inc. handling consumer product rights, eventually signing a deal with Playmates Toys in February. By June, 4Kids announced they had been conducting the merchandising program for the series, and that the series would be syndicated through subsidiary The Summit Media Group beginning in September in over 90 percent of U.S. markets. The series would also correspond to FCC regulations.

== Episodes ==
=== Series overview ===
Season	Episodes	Originally released	
Season	Episodes	First released	Last released
1	39	September 15, 1997	June 6, 1999

=== List of episodes ===
==== Season 1 (1997–99) ====
No. overall	No. in season	Title	Written by	Original release date
1	1	"Carnival"	Roger Hargreaves	September 15, 1997
Everyone celebrates the Misterland Carnival. Mr. Men and Little Miss Episodes: Little Miss Helpful Goes to the Fair; Mr. Small's Big Dream; Mr. Strong Makes a Big Splash (Note: The featured Mr. Men and Little Miss episodes of this are "Little Miss Helpful Goes to the Fair", "Mr. Small's Big Dream" and "Mr. Strong Makes a Splash".)
2	2	"Fitness Day"	Adam Hargreaves	September 16, 1997
It's Fitness Day in Misterland, a day to get physical. Mr. Men and Little Miss Episodes: Mr. Clever Flies His Kite; Mr. Fussy Takes a Well Earned Break; Mr. Lazy Can't Sleep Anymore (Note: The featured Mr. Men and Little Miss episodes of this are "Mr. Clever Flies His Kite", "Mr. Fussy Takes a Well Earned Break" and "Mr. Lazy Can't Sleep Anymore".)
3	3	"Animals"	Adam Hargreaves	September 17, 1997
Animals are on the loose in Misterland. Mr. Men and Little Miss Episodes: Mr. Clever's Daft Bet; Mr. Jelly's Show of Bravery; Mr. Nosey Goes Fishing
4	4	"Christmas"	Adam Hargreaves	December 14, 1997
It's Christmas time in Misterland and everyone is getting ready for Santa Claus to visit. Mr. Men and Little Miss Episodes: A Big Surprise for Mr. Mean; Happy Christmas Mr. Worry; Mr. Slow Takes the Lead (Note: The featured Mr. Men and Little Miss episodes of this are "A Big Surprise for Mr. Mean", "Happy Christmas, Mr. Worry" and "Mr. Slow Takes the Lead".)
5	5	"Sports"	Roger Hargreaves	February 12, 1998
The Mr. Men and Little Misses love playing sports. From football to baseball to tennis. Mr. Men and Little Miss Episodes: Thank Goodness for Mr. Slow; Mr. Nonsense's Strange Illness; Mr. Greedy Goes to a Dinner Party
6	6	"At Your Service"	Roger Hargreaves	June 13, 1998
It's Food Service (with a Smile) day in Misterland. Mr. Men and Little Miss Episodes: A Job for Little Miss Giggles; Mr. Silly's Silly Secret; Mr. Skinny is Up the Spout
7	7	"Movie Star"	Roger Hargreaves	July 5, 1998
Everyone wants to get noticed and be in showbiz! Mr. Men and Little Miss Episodes: Little Miss Star Goes to Jollywood; One Day in the Life of Mr. Perfect; Little Miss Sunshine Brings a Smile (Note: The featured Mr. Men and Little Miss episodes of this are "Little Miss Star Goes to Jollywood", "One Day in the Life of Mr. Perfect" and "Little Miss Sunshine Brings a Smile".)
8	8	"Job Talent"	Roger Hargreaves	August 13, 1998
The Mr. Men and Little Misses are on the hunt for the job that's best for them! Mr. Men and Little Miss Episodes: Mr. Small Finds a Job; Hello… Pizza Express?; Mr. Forgetful… Hey Waiter!
9	9	"Winners and Losers"	Roger Hargreaves	September 23, 1998
It's Race Day in Misterland! The Mr. Men and Little Misses are learning how to do good sports. Mr. Men and Little Miss Episodes: Mr. Skinny's Incredible Bet; Little Miss Wise's Crazy Day; Little Miss Late Beats Them All (Note: The featured Mr. Men and Little Miss episodes of this are "Mr. Skinny's Incredible Bet", "Little Miss Wise's Crazy Day" and "Little Miss Late Beats Them All".)
10	10	"Halloween"	Roger Hargreaves	October 31, 1998
It's the spookiest time of year in Misterland...Halloween! Mr. Men and Little Miss Episodes: Mr. Brave Goes Ghost Hunting; Little Miss Wise's Day Out at the Fun Fair; Mr. Jelly Goes Time-Traveling
11	11	"Around the World"	Roger Hargreaves	January 23, 1999
The Mr. Men and Little Misses are traveling around the world! Mr. Men and Little Miss Episodes: Little Miss Chatterbox Finds Her Calling; Mr. Perfect Goes West; A Weekend with Little Miss Contrary
12	12	"Storybook"	Roger Hargreaves	January 24, 1999
Join the Mr. Men and Little Misses for a good story Mr. Men and Little Miss Episodes: Mr. Worry and the Giant; Lunch with Little Miss Tiny; Mr. Forgetful, World's Best Actor
13	13	"Money"	Adam Hargreaves	January 30, 1999
There's no need to money bucks for Misterland. Mr. Men and Little Miss Episodes: Mr. Mean Hasn't a Penny Left; Little Miss Somersault's Rival; Little Miss Tidy and the Winning Ticket
14	14	"Classy"	Roger Hargreaves	February 6, 1999
It's important to have class in Misterland. Mr. Men and Little Miss Episodes: Mr. Clever's Daft Bet; Another Victory for Little Miss Splendid; Little Miss Star the Leading Witness
15	15	"Baby"	Roger Hargreaves	February 13, 1999
The Mr. Men and Little Misses have a case of babysitter blues. Mr. Men and Little Miss Episodes: A Job for Little Miss Giggles; Little Miss Stubborn Goes Right to the Bitter End; An Unforgettable Sunday for Little Miss Tiny
16	16	"Mystery"	Adam Hargreaves	February 20, 1999
There's a mystery to be solved in Misterland. Mr. Men and Little Miss Episodes: Mr. Nosey Solves a Mystery; Little Miss Tidy Loses a Friend; Mr. Tickle Saves the Day
17	17	"Help"	Roger Hargreaves	February 27, 1999
People always like lending a hand in Misterland Mr. Men and Little Miss Episodes: Mr. Clumsy, Head Butler; What a Mess, Little Miss Helpful; That's Gratitude, Mr. Uppity
18	18	"Space"	Adam Hargreaves	March 6, 1999
Explore space with the Mr. Men and Little Misses Mr. Men and Little Miss Episodes: Mr. Clever's Invention; Mr. Nonsense Rows to the Moon; Mr. Daydream Talks to the Stars
19	19	"Friendship"	Adam Hargreaves	March 13, 1999
The Mr. Men and Little Misses are making new friends Mr. Men and Little Miss Episodes: Little Miss Lucky's Special Friend; Happy Birthday Little Miss Scatterbrain; Little Miss Dotty Goes Home to the Farm
20	20	"Circus"	Roger Hargreaves	March 20, 1999
The circus has come to Misterland! Mr. Men and Little Miss Episodes: Mr. Strong: King of the Circus; He… Hello Little Miss Shy; Mr. Funny Puts on a Show
21	21	"Practical Joke"	Adam Hargreaves	March 27, 1999
Some Mr. Men and Little Misses love playing the occasional practical joke! Mr. Men and Little Miss Episodes: The Joke is on Little Miss Naughty; Mr. Mischief is Caught in his Own Game; What a Choice for Little Miss Fickle!
22	22	"Prank"	Adam Hargreaves	April 3, 1999
It's Prank Day in Misterland Mr. Men and Little Miss Episodes: Little Miss Trouble and the Magic Paint; Little Miss Naughty Goes Skiing; Little Miss Star the Leading Witness
23	23	"Ring the Bell"	Adam Hargreaves	April 10, 1999
The Mr. Men has changed to do what's this sound Ring, ring the bell. Mr. Men and Little Miss Episodes: It's Very Noisy for Mr. Quiet; Mr. Chatterbox and the Parrot; Little Miss Greedy: Belle of the Ball
24	24	"Outdoor"	Adam Hargreaves	April 17, 1999
The Mr. Men and Little Misses love the great outdoors! Mr. Men and Little Miss Episodes: Mr. Dizzy Goes Dog-Sitting; A Very Happy Day for Mr. Happy; Mr. Muddle Goes Skating
25	25	"Music"	Adam Hargreaves	April 24, 1999
It's time to make music with the Mr. Men and Little Misses Mr. Men and Little Miss Episodes: Mr. Cheerful Doffs His Hat; Mr. Noisy the Music Man; What a Question, Little Miss Curious!
26	26	"Springtime"	Roger Hargreaves	May 1, 1999
Spring has sprung in Misterland Mr. Men and Little Miss Episodes: Mr. Mischief Becomes an Artist; Mr. Bump Has an Accident; That's Gratitude Mr. Uppity
27	27	"Cheer-Up Day"	Roger Hargreaves	May 8, 1999
Even the Mr. Men and Little Misses need cheering up now and then. Mr. Men and Little Miss Episodes: Mr. Grumble Boils Over; Little Miss Bossy Has a Busy Day; No Food is No Fun for Mr. Greedy
28	28	"Make a Wish"	Roger Hargreaves	May 15, 1999
Everyone is making wishes today. Wishes that are for better or for worse Mr. Men and Little Miss Episodes: Mr. Bounce Finds Paradise; Mr. Grumble's Holiday; Mr. Bump Goes on a Trip
29	29	"Back to School"	Adam Hargreaves	May 16, 1999
September means it's back to school for the Mr. Men and Little Misses. Who knows what they will learn! Mr. Men and Little Miss Episodes: Little Miss Busy, Do-it-Yourself Teacher; Little Miss Bossy Has a Busy Day; Mr. Cheerful Doffs His Hat
30	30	"Clean-Up Day"	Roger Hargreaves	May 17, 1999
It's Clean-Up Day in Misterland. Everyone is making their homes neat and tidy. Mr. Men and Little Miss Episodes: An Invitation for Mr. Messy; A New House for Mr. Wrong; Little Miss Neat Sees Spots
31	31	"Birthday"	Adam Hargreaves	May 18, 1999
Everyone is celebrating birthdays in Misterland! Mr. Men and Little Miss Episodes: Little Miss Scatterbrain Puts Everything in Turmoil; That's Enough Little Miss Bossy; A Surprise for Mr. Tall
32	32	"Magic"	Adam Hargreaves	May 19, 1999
The Mr. Men and Little Misses are conjuring up magic spells! Mr. Men and Little Miss Episodes: Little Miss Chatterbox Goes to Seatown; Little Miss Magic to the Rescue; Mr. Impossible's Big Lesson
33	33	"Movie"	Roger Hargreaves	May 20, 1999
The Mr. Men and Little Misses are off to the movies. Mr. Men and Little Miss Episodes: Mr. Forgetful, World's Best Actor; Mr. Clumsy in the Brains and the Brawn; Little Miss Star Goes to Jollywood
34	34	"Fix-It-Up Day"	Roger Hargreaves	May 21, 1999
It's Fix-It-Up Day in Misterland. Everyone is doing some repairs and odd jobs around their homes. Mr. Men and Little Miss Episodes: Mr. Mischief Becomes an Artist; Little Miss Busy Takes a Break; Hurry Mr. Rush... Autumn Is Coming
35	35	"Lost and Found"	Adam Hargreaves	May 22, 1999
Things are mysteriously disappearing in Misterland. Mr. Men and Little Miss Episodes: Mr. Nosey Solves a Mystery; Isn't Little Miss Trouble Kind...; Mr. Chatterbox Loses His Voice
36	36	"Sweet Dreams"	Adam Hargreaves	May 23, 1999
Shh! The Mr. Men and Little Misses are dreaming in their sleep. Mr. Men and Little Miss Episodes: Mr. Worry and the Giant; Mr. Small's Big Dream; Little Miss Late Finally Catches Up
37	37	"Brain Power"	Roger Hargreaves	May 29, 1999
The Mr. Men and Little Misses are using their brains for great ideas. Mr. Men and Little Miss Episodes: Mr. Dizzy Promises the Moon; Little Miss Shy Goes to the Fair; Mr. Brave vs Koko the Gorilla
38	38	"Gifts"	Adam Hargreaves	May 30, 1999
There are lots of gifts in Misterland! Mr. Men and Little Miss Episodes: Mr. Lazy Takes an Afternoon Nap; Golly, Mr. Grumpy's Smiling; Little Miss Splendid's Gift
39	39	"Free Food"	Adam Hargreaves	June 5, 1999
There's free food in Misterland! Come and get it! Mr. Men and Little Miss Episodes: Mr. Uppity's Big House; Little Miss Greedy's Strange Illness; Hello, Pizza Express?
40	40	"Illness"	Adam Hargreaves	June 6, 1999
The Mr. Men and Little Misses aren't feeling very well today. Mr. Men and Little Miss Episodes: Mr. Chatterbox Loses His Voice; Little Miss Neat Sees Spots; Little Miss Greedy: Belle of the Ball

== Cast ==
=== The Mr. Men Players ===
- Catherine Fitch - Mad Scientist, Contestant, and Theatre Patron
- Peter Keleghan - Pal, Game Show Guy, and Frakenclown
- Marguerite Pigott - Newslady, Hostess, Actress, Strong Girl, and Theatre Patron
- Cliff Saunders - Buddy, Contestant, Caveman, Couch Potato, and Theatre Patron
- Sean Sullivan - Assistant Scientist, Guy in Theatre, and Director

=== Voices ===
- Len Carlson - Mr. Tickle, Mr. Greedy, Mr. Sneeze, Mr. Messy, Mr. Uppity, Mr. Funny, Mr. Chatterbox, Mr. Fussy, Mr. Bounce, Mr. Strong, Mr. Grumpy, Mr. Quiet, Mr. Nonsense, Mr. Skinny, Mr. Clever, Mr. Slow, Mr. Perfect, Mr. Cheerful and Additional Voices
- Alyson Court - Little Miss Sunshine, Little Miss Trouble, Little Miss Giggles, Little Miss Magic, Little Miss Shy, Little Miss Chatterbox, Little Miss Late, Little Miss Busy, Little Miss Wise, Little Miss Tidy, Little Miss Fickle and Additional Voices
- Neil Crone - Mr. Bump, Mr. Messy, Mr. Topsy-Turvy, Mr. Silly, Mr. Small, Mr. Lazy, Mr. Impossible, Mr. Clumsy, Mr. Rush, Mr. Worry, Mr. Busy, Mr. Brave, Mr. Grumble and Additional Voices
- Catherine Disher - Mr. Muddle, Little Miss Naughty, Little Miss Neat, Little Miss Tiny, Little Miss Helpful, Little Miss Splendid, Little Miss Twins, Little Miss Lucky, Little Miss Brainy, Little Miss Stubborn, Little Miss Curious, Little Miss Fun, Little Miss Somersault and Additional Voices
- Judy Marshak - Little Miss Bossy, Little Miss Dotty, Little Miss Scatterbrain, Little Miss Star, Little Miss Greedy, Little Miss Contrary and Additional Voices
- Ron Rubin - Mr. Happy, Mr. Nosey, Mr. Daydream, Mr. Forgetful, Mr. Jelly, Mr. Noisy, Mr. Mean, Mr. Dizzy, Mr. Tall, Mr. Wrong, Mr. Mischief, The Narrator and Additional Voices

== Merchandise ==
Playmates Toys released an extensive range of products for the series which included plush toys, figures, vehicles, bath toys, board games and puzzles.
