= The Mr. Men Show =

Animated television series

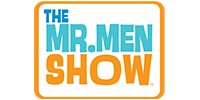
- Series logo
- Genre: Sketch comedy Slapstick; Musical
- Created by: Roger Hargreaves; Adam Hargreaves
- Based on: Mr. Men & Little Miss, by: Roger Hargreaves; Adam Hargreaves
- Developed by: Kate Boutilier; Eryk Casemiro
- Written by: Kate Boutilier; Eyrk Casemiro; Monica Piper; Dan Guntzelman; David Regal; Vito Ciscomi; Adam Cohen; Mark Risley; Michael Daedalus Kenny; Sean Pendergrass
- Directed by: Mark Risley
- Voices of: Donald Corren; Jeff Stewart; Paul Greenberg; Alicyn Packard; Phil Lollar; Katie Leigh; Peter Rida Michail; Joey D'Auria; Richard Epcar; Susan Balboni; Rick Zieff; Godfrey Danchimah; Kamali Minter; Cheryl Chase; Rebecca West
- Narrated by: Joey D'Auria (U.S.); Simon Callow (U.K.)
- Composer: Jared Faber
- Countries of origin: United States; United Kingdom
- Original language: English
- No. of seasons: 2
- No. of episodes: 104

Production
- Executive producers: Roger Hargreaves; Adam Hargreaves (original); Kate Boutilier; Eryk Casemiro; Diana Manson; Kurt Mueller; Ashley Postlewaite; Darrell Van Citters; For Five: Nick Wilson; For Cartoon Network: Alice Cahn
- Producers: Karen Ialacci; Peggy Regan
- Editor: Michael D'Ambrosio
- Running time: 12 minutes
- Production companies: Chorion; Renegade Animation

Original release
- Network: Cartoon Network (U.S.); Five (Milkshake!) (U.K.)
- Release: February 4, 2008 – October 19, 2009

Related
- Mr. Men (1974–1978); Little Miss (1983); Mr. Men and Little Miss (1995–1997); The Mr. Men Show (1997–1999); Timbuctoo (1998–1999); Mr. Men Little Miss Mini Adventures (2025–present)

The Mr. Men Show is an animated children's television series based on the Mr. Men series of books created by the British author and illustrator Roger Hargreaves—later continued by his son Adam Hargreaves. It is a variety program—unlike the original basis for the show, it primarily features comedy sketches, pantomimes, dance numbers, and music videos.

The series aired in the US on Cartoon Network in 2008, and aired in the UK on Channel 5's Milkshake! on February 25, 2008. The series ended on October 19, 2009.

== Summary ==
Loosely based on the classic children's book series Mr. Men and Little Miss, the show focuses on the Mr. Men and Little Misses and their everyday adventures in the fictional town of Dillydale. Each episode is composed of short sketches centred around a specific theme, location or object, interspliced with short pantomime skits and music videos.

The Mr. Men that appear in the show in order of the original publication of their respective books are: Mr. Tickle, Mr. Happy, Mr. Nosey, Mr. Bump, Mr. Messy, Mr. Small, Mr. Jelly (under his American name Mr. Nervous), Mr. Noisy, Mr. Lazy, Mr. Funny, Mr. Fussy (under the name Mr. Persnickety in the American dub and Mr. Pernickety in the British dub, both in season 1), Mr. Bounce, Mr. Strong, Mr. Grumpy, Mr. Quiet, Mr. Tall, Mr. Rude, along with 2 new show-exclusive Mr. Men: Mr. Scatterbrain and Mr. Stubborn.

The Little Misses that also appear in order of the original publication of their respective books are: Miss Bossy, Miss Naughty, Miss Sunshine, Miss Giggles, Miss Helpful, Miss Magic, Miss Chatterbox, Miss Curious, Miss Scary, Miss Whoops, along with 2 new show-exclusive Little Misses: Miss Calamity and Miss Daredevil.

== Voice cast ==
=== Original American version ===
- Donald Corren (credited as Sam Gold) as Mr. Happy, Mr. Grumpy and Mr. Bounce
- Jeff Stewart as Mr. Tickle and the Aliens
- Paul Greenberg (credited as Aaron Albertus) as Mr. Bump and Mr. Quiet
- Alicyn Packard as Little Miss Naughty, Little Miss Sunshine and Little Miss Whoops
- Phil Lollar as Mr. Lazy, Mr. Small and Mr. Strong
- Katie Leigh as Little Miss Chatterbox, Little Miss Daredevil and Little Miss Helpful
- Peter Rida Michail as Mr. Messy
- Joey D'Auria (credited as Joseph J. Terry) as Narrator, Mr. Fussy, Mr. Rude and Mr. Scatterbrain
- Richard Epcar as Mr. Noisy
- Susan Balboni as Little Miss Scary
- Rick Zieff (credited as Danny Katiana) as Mr. Nosey and Mr. Nervous
- Godfrey Danchimah as Mr. Stubborn, Mr. Tall and Mr. Metal
- Kamali Minter (credited as Prudence Alcott) as Little Miss Calamity and Little Miss Magic
- Cheryl Chase (credited as Sophia Roberts) as Little Miss Bossy and Little Miss Curious
- Rebecca West as Little Miss Giggles

=== British re-dubbed version ===
- Simon Greenall as Mr. Happy (season 1), Mr. Strong, Mr. Grumpy, Mr. Bump, Mr. Quiet and Mr. Bounce
- Rob Rackstraw as Mr. Happy (season 2), Mr. Tickle, Mr. Messy, Mr. Noisy and Mr. Fussy
- Jo Wyatt as Little Miss Sunshine (Season 1), Little Miss Scary (season 1), Little Miss Helpful (season 1) and Little Miss Naughty (season 1)
- Teresa Gallagher as Little Miss Naughty (season 2), Little Miss Chatterbox, Little Miss Daredevil and Little Miss Whoops
- Keith Wickham as Mr. Small and Mr. Tall
- Steven Kynman as Mr. Nosey
- Tim Whitnall as Mr. Strong (singing voice), Mr. Lazy and Mr. Nervous
- Lewis MacLeod as Mr. Stubborn
- Aline Mowat as Little Miss Calamity
- Emma Tate as Little Miss Sunshine (season 2), Little Miss Helpful (season 2) and Little Miss Magic
- Alex Kelly as Little Miss Scary (season 2) and Little Miss Bossy
- Claire Morgan as Little Miss Curious and Little Miss Giggles
- Simon Callow as The Narrator
- Jeff Stewart as The Aliens (reprise roles)
- Joey D'Auria (credited as Joseph J. Terry) as Mr. Rude and Mr. Scatterbrain (reprise roles)
- Peter Rida Michail as Mr. Messy (singing voice)
- Paul Greenberg as Mr. Bump (singing voice)
- Richard Epcar as Mr. Noisy (screaming voice)
- Alicyn Packard as Little Miss Sunshine (singing voice)
- Godfrey Danchimah as Mr. Metal (reprise role)

== Production ==
The Mr. Men Show was produced in Los Angeles by Renegade Animation and Chorion for Five and Cartoon Network, respectively. Preproduction of the show began in 2004, when Roger Hargreaves' widow Christine Hargreaves sold the franchise rights to Chorion. According to Adam Hargreaves, "in order to grow the success of these loveable characters and expand into new territories", a new television series would need to be produced. The show's art style was inspired by the television series Rowan & Martin's Laugh-In and the works of United Productions of America. Showrunner Eyrk Casemiro stated "we wanted a nod to the '70s, when the books were originated. A lot of the songs in the show have a funkdelic/disco/Bootsy Collins quality to them. A lot of props look like they're out of The Mike Douglas Show, like the microphones and chairs on set for the talk show segments."

Artistic license was taken in order to adapt the books for television, including name changes, design alterations, and the creation of several new characters. Little Miss Calamity, Little Miss Daredevil and Mr. Metal were created exclusively for the series. Due to the large amount of characters in the book series, only a select amount were included in the show, of which, Little Miss Fickle, Little Miss Fabulous and the Little Miss Twins were originally planned to be included, but they were removed per request by Cartoon Network for fear of turning off boy audiences. In Roger Hargreaves' original book series, each of the Mr. Men and Little Miss characters were given a separate hometown, such as Happyland, Tiddletown and Nonsenseland. In the television series, all of the characters live in the same city, the township of Dillydale. 25 characters were featured in the first season. A second season was greenlit in late 2008 and aired in late 2009, it added 6 more characters to the cast, while removing the character of Little Miss Calamity in turn. The series has been said to have helped expand the Mr. Men franchise globally.

== Episodes ==
=== Series overview ===
Season	Segments	Episodes	Originally released	
Season	Segments	Episodes	First released	Last released
1	52	26	February 4, 2008	May 3, 2008
2	52	26	September 8, 2009	October 19, 2009

=== Season 1 (2008) ===
Note: All episodes in this season were directed by Mark Risley.

No.	Title	Written by	Storyboard by	Original release date	Prod. code
1	"Physical"	Kate Boutilier & Eryk Casemiro	Mark Stevens	February 4, 2008	101
2	"Boo-Boos"	Kate Boutilier & Eryk Casemiro	Erik Knutson	February 4, 2008	102
3	"Farm"	Kate Boutilier & Eryk Casemiro	Sean Pendergrass	February 5, 2008	103
4	"Movies"	Vito Viscomi	Sean Pendergrass	February 5, 2008	104
5	"Science"	Kate Boutilier & Eryk Casemiro	Anne Walker	February 6, 2008	105
6	"Lake"	Kate Boutilier & Eryk Casemiro	Darin McGowan	February 6, 2008	106
7	"Books"	Kate Boutilier & Eryk Casemiro	Michael Daedalus Kenny	February 7, 2008	107
8	"Beach"	Vito Viscomi	Michael Daedalus Kenny	February 7, 2008	108
9	"Boats"	Kate Boutilier & Eryk Casemiro	Howie Perry	February 8, 2008	109
10	"Mall"	Kate Boutilier & Eryk Casemiro	Walt Holcombe	February 8, 2008	110
11	"Flying"	Monica Piper	Brian Hatfield	February 15, 2008	111
12	"Hobbies"	Kate Boutilier & Eryk Casemiro	Scott O'Brien	February 15, 2008	112
13	"Dance"	Kate Boutilier & Eryk Casemiro	Philip Pignotti	March 15, 2008	113
14	"Inventions"	David Regal	Sam Niemann	March 15, 2008	114
15	"Fair"	David Regal	Scott O'Brien	February 14, 2008	115
16	"Camping"	Kate Boutilier & Eryk Casemiro	Anne Walker	February 14, 2008	116
17	"Amusement Park"	Paul Greenberg	Erik Knutson	February 29, 2008	117
18	"Trains"	Adam Cohen	Michael Daedalus Kenny	February 13, 2008	118
19	"Paint"	Kate Boutilier & Eryk Casemiro	Richard Bazley	February 19, 2008	119
20	"Fish"	Kate Boutilier & Eryk Casemiro	Walt Holcombe	February 19, 2008	120
21	"Adventure"	John Hardman	Sean Pendergrass	February 28, 2008	121
22	"Construction"	Kate Boutilier & Eryk Casemiro	Darin McGowan	February 28, 2008	122
23	"Snow"	Dan Guntzelman	Howie Perry	February 11, 2008	123
24	"Dillydale Day"	Kate Boutilier & Eryk Casemiro	Anne Walker	February 11, 2008	124
25	"Jobs"	Kate Boutilier & Eryk Casemiro	Walt Holcombe	May 3, 2008	125
26	"Hotel"	Kate Boutilier & Eryk Casemiro	Sean Pendergrass	May 3, 2008	126
27	"Collecting"	Kate Boutilier & Eryk Casemiro	Walt Holcombe	February 20, 2008	127
28	"Chores"	Kate Boutilier & Eryk Casemiro	Sam Niemann	February 20, 2008	128
29	"Restaurants"	Kate Boutilier & Eryk Casemiro	Anne Walker	February 27, 2008	129
30	"Canned Goods"	Kate Boutilier & Eryk Casemiro	Brian Hatfield	February 27, 2008	130
31	"Full Moon"	Kate Boutilier & Eryk Casemiro	Erik Knutson	February 21, 2008	131
32	"Night"	Kate Boutilier & Eryk Casemiro	Philip Pignotti	February 21, 2008	132
33	"Food"	Kate Boutilier & Eryk Casemiro	Erik Knutson	February 26, 2008	133
34	"Bugs"	Kate Boutilier & Eryk Casemiro	Walt Holcombe	February 26, 2008	134
35	"Cooking"	David Regal	James Lopez	February 29, 2008	135
36	"Rainy Day"	Jim Biederman	Sam Niemann	February 13, 2008	136
37	"Heatwave"	Kate Boutilier & Eryk Casemiro	Michael Daedalus Kenny	April 8, 2008	137
38	"Sleep"	Kate Boutilier & Eryk Casemiro	Darin McGowan	April 8, 2008	138
39	"Gardens"	Kate Boutilier & Eryk Casemiro	Anne Walker	March 3, 2008	139
40	"Parade"	Kate Boutilier & Eryk Casemiro	Philip Pignotti	March 3, 2008	140
41	"Games"	John Hardman	Sean Pendergrass	March 4, 2008	141
42	"Superstore"	Kate Boutilier & Eryk Casemiro	Scott O'Brien	March 4, 2008	142
43	"Music"	Jim Biederman	Anne Walker	March 5, 2008	143
44	"Birthday"	Monica Piper	Shellie Kvilvang O'Brien	March 5, 2008	144
45	"Car Wash"	Kate Boutilier & Eryk Casemiro	Sean Pendergrass	March 6, 2008	145
46	"Wildlife"	David Regal	Howie Perry	March 6, 2008	146
47	"Yard Work"^{US} "Lawns^{UK}"	Paul Greenberg	James Lopez	March 7, 2008	147
48	"Cars"	Dan Guntzelman	Erik Knutson	March 7, 2008	148
49	"Sightseeing"	Kate Boutilier & Eryk Casemiro	Anne Walker	March 10, 2008	149
50	"The Dark"	Kate Boutilier & Eryk Casemiro	Michael Daedalus Kenny	March 10, 2008	150
51	"Circus"	Kate Boutilier & Eryk Casemiro	Michael Daedalus Kenny	March 11, 2008	151
52	"Ships"	Kate Boutilier & Eryk Casemiro	Jackie Lopez	March 11, 2008	152

=== Season 2 (2009) ===
Note: The first 11 episodes in this season were directed by Mark Risley and the remaining 15 episodes were directed by Mark Risley and Darrell Van Citters. All episodes in this season were written by Kate Boutilier and Eryk Casemiro except "Up and Down", which was written by Mark Risley and Michael Daedalus Kenny and "Library" which was written by Mark Risley and Sean Pendergrass.

No.	Title	Storyboard by	Original release date	Prod. code
53	"Picnics"	Mike Hollingsworth	September 8, 2009	201
54	"Driving"	Michael Daedalus Kenny	September 8, 2009	202
55	"Outer Space"	Erik Knutson	September 9, 2009	203
56	"Clean Teeth"	Walt Holcombe	September 9, 2009	203
57	"Airports"	Anne Walker	September 10, 2009	204
58	"Shoes"	Joey Adams	September 10, 2009	205
59	"Arts and Crafts"	John Anderson	September 11, 2009	206
60	"Game Shows"	Sean Pendergrass	September 11, 2009	207
61	"Garages"	Joey Adams	September 14, 2009	208
62	"Eyeglasses"	Anne Walker	September 14, 2009	209
63	"Toys"	Erik Knutson	September 15, 2009	210
64	"Reptiles"	Sean Pendergrass	September 15, 2009	210
65	"Hats"	Walt Holcombe	September 16, 2009	211
66	"Robots"	Michael Daedalus Kenny	September 16, 2009	212
67	"Parties"	Anne Walker	September 17, 2009	213
68	"Up and Down"	John Anderson	September 17, 2009	214
69	"Gifts"	Anna Hollingsworth	September 18, 2009	215
70	"Sun and Moon"	Anna Hollingsworth	September 18, 2009	216
71	"Telephone"	Sam Dransfield and John D. Anderson	September 21, 2009	217
72	"Seashore"	Anne Walker	September 21, 2009	218
73	"Dining Out"	Mike Hollingsworth	September 22, 2009	219
74	"Washing and Drying"	Joey Adams	September 22, 2009	220
75	"Clocks"	John D. Anderson	September 23, 2009	221
76	"Fruit"	Anna Hollingsworth	September 23, 2009	222
77	"Radio"	Michael Daedalus Kenny	September 24, 2009	223
78	"Supermarket"	Chris Harmon	September 24, 2009	224
79	"Skyscrapers"	Mike Hollingsworth	September 25, 2009	225
80	"Cinema"	Chris Harmon	September 25, 2009	226
81	"Getting Around"	Dean Criswell	September 28, 2009	227
82	"Sneezes and Hiccups"	Walt Holcombe	September 28, 2009	228
83	"Post Office"	Anna Hollingsworth and John D. Anderson	September 29, 2009	229
84	"Pets"	Sean Pendergrass	September 29, 2009	230
85	"Dance Dance Dance"	Chris Harmon	September 30, 2009	231
86	"Trees"	Sean Pendergrass and Joey Adams	September 30, 2009	232
87	"Library"	Erik Knutson	October 1, 2009	233
88	"Pirates"	Dean Criswell and Anne Walker	October 1, 2009	234
89	"Goo"	John D. Anderson	October 2, 2009	235
90	"Trains & Planes"	Erik Knutson	October 2, 2009	236
91	"Next Door"	Anne Walker	October 5, 2009	237
92	"Out to Sea"	Walt Holcombe	October 5, 2009	238
93	"Lunch"	Anne Walker	October 7, 2009	239
94	"Machines"	Chris Harmon	October 7, 2009	240
95	"Home Improvement"	Anne Walker	October 9, 2009	241
96	"Fairies and Gnomes"	John D. Anderson	October 9, 2009	242
97	"Birds"	Sean Pendergrass and John D. Anderson	October 13, 2009	243
98	"Bath and Bubbles"	Chris Harmon	October 13, 2009	244
99	"Sand and Surf"	Anne Walker, Erik Knutson, and John D. Anderson	October 15, 2009	245
100	"Parks"	Dean Criswell	October 15, 2009	246
101	"Surprises"	Anne Walker and Sean Pendergrass	October 16, 2009	247
102	"Travel"	Michael Daedalus Kenny	October 16, 2009	248
103	"Bad Weather"	Michael Daedalus Kenny	October 19, 2009	249
104	"Pests"	Todd Risley	October 19, 2009	250

== Reception ==
Upon the show's announcement, fans of the book series were critical of the redesigns of the characters. After its debut, The Mr. Men Show received positive reviews. Animation Magazine wrote "Using a sketch comedy format and more than 25 main characters, the new Mr. Men Show boldly goes where few other preschool toons have dared to roam!". The Hollywood Reporter stated "Episodes pick up where Hargreaves’ pages left off...while the animation is imaginative and lively, the best part is the show's savvy sense of humor...The Mr. Men Show will touch everyone who tunes in".
