= Mr Films =

Film studio

Mr Films, Ltd
- Type: Name-only unit
- Industry: Entertainment, children's television series
- Founded: 1973; 53 years ago
- Founders: Terry Ward & Trevor Bond
- Defunct: December 31, 1991; 34 years ago
- Fate: Closed
- Products: Mr Men show

Mr Films, Ltd was a British film studio (based first in Epping and then at Shepperton Studios) that made and produced all of the Mr Men and Little Miss programmes from 1974 through 1991. The company also produced several television ads, cinema adverts and one feature film.

== History ==
Mr Films, Ltd was established in 1973 by Terry Ward and Trevor Bond.

The company closed down in 2004 when along with the Mr Men and Little Miss underlying rights owned by Mrs Christine Hargreaves and Mr Films Ltd was bought by Chorion. For £28 million.

Trevor Bond retired to Florida, where he died on 11 February, 2023, and Terry Ward retired to the Surrey countryside.

== Key people ==
Roger Hargreaves - Chairman
Christine Hargreaves - Co-CEO
Terry Ward - Mr Men Animation Director Co-CEO
Trevor Bond - Animation Producer

== Produced ==
Mr Men - All Mr Men and Little Miss animated films and TV shows (1974-2004)
