= List of Little Miss characters =

Fictional characters created by Roger Hargreaves

In 2012 a box set of 36 books was released. ISBN 978-0-6035-6640-0

The following is a list of Little Miss characters from the children's book series by Roger Hargreaves. Books one (Little Miss Bossy) to twenty-one (Little Miss Contrary) were written and illustrated by Roger Hargreaves, while books twenty-two (Little Miss Busy) to thirty (Little Miss Somersault) were ghostwritten by Viviane Cohen and Evelyne Lallemand, and illustrated by Colette David under Roger Hargreaves' name. The remainder were written and illustrated by Roger Hargreaves' son, Adam Hargreaves.

== A ==
=== Little Miss All-Goes-Well ===
Little Miss All-Goes-Well is part of the Little Miss series. Little Miss Carefree has a perfect life

Little Miss Carefree has also been published under the alternative titles Madame Tout-Va-Bien (French), Η Κυρία Αισιόδοξη (Greek).

Little Miss Carefree along with Mr. Worry appeared in an InterCity advert.

== B ==
=== Little Miss Baby ===
Little Miss Baby is part of the Little Miss Spice Girls series. The character is based on Baby Spice of the pop group Spice Girls.

=== Little Miss Bad ===
Little Miss Bad
- Author: Adam Hargreaves
- Illustrator: Adam Hargreaves
- Language: English
- Series: Mr. Men
- Genre: Children's literature
- Publication date: 3 April 2003
- Publication place: United Kingdom
- Pages: 34 pp
- ISBN: 978-0-7498-5853-7
- OCLC: 51438336
- Preceded by: Little Miss Scary
- Followed by: Little Miss Whoops

Little Miss Bad is the 32nd book in the Little Miss series.

Little Miss Bad is a naughty and mischievous Little Miss character. One day, there was a Grand Contest, and this was to see who is the most mischievous of all.

Little Miss Bad appears under the titles Madame Farceuse (French), Doña Malota (Spanish).

=== Little Miss Birthday ===
Little Miss Birthday is part of the Little Miss series. Little Miss Birthday loves birthdays just like her brother, Mr. Birthday. Little Miss Birthday has also been published under the alternative title of Madame Anniversaire (French).

=== Little Miss Bossy ===
Little Miss Bossy
- Author: Roger Hargreaves
- Illustrator: Roger Hargreaves
- Language: English
- Publication date: 1 September 1981
- Publication place: United Kingdom
- Pages: 34 pp
- ISBN: 978-0-85985-182-4
- Followed by: Little Miss Naughty

Little Miss Bossy is the 1st book in the Little Miss series by Roger Hargreaves. Little Miss Bossy is very bossy (hence her name) and Miss Bossy is as rude as Mr. Uppity, so Miss Bossy is given a pair of boots which have a mind of their own; they don't listen to her, because Miss Bossy is too bossy.

Miss Bossy appeared in the second season of The Mr. Men Show; her hat is positioned differently and her flower has no stem, so it is attached to the side of her hat instead. Miss Bossy has eyelashes like Little Miss Daredevil; her voice actresses are Alex Kelly (UK) and Cheryl Chase (credited as Sophie Roberts) (US).

Little Miss Bossy appears under the titles Madame Autoritaire (French), Doña Mandona (Spanish), Η Κυρία Αυταρχική (Greek), Bàdào Xiǎojiě (霸道小姐; Taiwan), Ujjul Yang (우쭐양; Korean) and Menina Mandona (Portuguese).

=== Little Miss Brainy ===
Little Miss Brainy
- Author: Viviane Cohen and Evelyne Lallemand
- Illustrator: Colette David
- Cover artist: Adam Hargreaves
- Language: English
- Publication date: 14 January 1990 (France); 1994 (UK)
- Publication place: France; United Kingdom
- Pages: 34 pp
- ISBN: 978-0-7498-5249-8
- Preceded by: Little Miss Tidy
- Followed by: Little Miss Stubborn

Little Miss Brainy is the 26th book in the Little Miss series. Little Miss Brainy always has something smart to say, but her brains can get her into tricky situations sometimes. A lot of Mr. Men were coming, and they asked questions to her, which Miss Brainy answered.

Little Miss Brainy has a blue oval-shaped body, a blue triangle-shaped nose, and straight yellow hair with a red bow on top of her head.

Little Miss Brainy appears under the titles Madame Je-sais-tout (French), Doña Inteligente (Spanish), Ttokttok Yang (똑똑양; Korean), Η Κυρία Σοφή (Greek).

=== Little Miss Brave ===
Little Miss Brave
- Author: Adam Hargreaves
- Illustrator: Adam Hargreaves
- Language: English
- Series: Little Miss
- Genre: Children's literature
- Publication date: 3 September 2021
- Publication place: United Kingdom
- Preceded by: Little Miss Inventor
- Followed by: Little Miss Surprise

Little Miss Brave is the 39th book in the Little Miss series by Roger. Little Miss Brave is one of the two characters voted to become an official character by the public.

Little Miss Brave is fearless in the face of danger and proud to stand up for what Little Miss Brave believes in. Little Miss Brave is not afraid to speak out and her inner strength and confidence is inspiring, particularly for Little Miss Shy. Will Miss Brave give her the courage to challenge expectations too?

Little Miss Brave is blueish-green with purple hair and a red hairband.

Little Miss Brave is Madame Courageuse in French and Doña Valiente in Spanish.

=== Little Miss Brilliant ===
Little Miss Brilliant is part of the Little Miss series. Little Miss Brilliant is very intelligent. Little Miss Brilliant has also been published under the alternative title of Madame Géniale (French).

=== Little Miss Busy ===
Little Miss Busy
- Author: Viviane Cohen and Evelyne Lallemand
- Illustrator: Colette David
- Language: English
- Publication date: 14 January 1990 (France); 1994 (UK)
- Publication place: France; United Kingdom
- Pages: 34 pp
- ISBN: 978-0-7498-5243-6
- Preceded by: Little Miss Contrary
- Followed by: Little Miss Quick

Little Miss Busy is the 22nd book in the Little Miss series. Little Miss Busy is a hyperactive Little Miss character and Miss Busy always has something to do. Every time Miss Busy needed a rest, and there was a loud thump (being the sound of her falling over backwards onto the bed). Miss Busy then went on a holiday, which Mr. Nonsense thought about.

Little Miss Busy appears under the titles Madame Boulot (French), Doña Ocupada (Spanish), Η Κυρία Εργατική (Greek), and Mánglù Xiǎojiě (忙碌小姐; Taiwan).

=== Little Miss Busy-Body ===
Little Miss Busy-Body is part of the Little Miss series. Miss Busy-Body has also been published under the alternative titles of Madame Casse-Pieds (French) and Η Κυρία Ενοχλητική (Greek).

== C ==
=== Little Miss Calamity ===
Little Miss Calamity
- Portrayed by: Prudence Alcott (U.S.); Aline Mowat (UK)

Little Miss Calamity was a new Little Miss character created for The Mr. Men Show. Little Miss Calamity was almost always in trouble. Usually the trouble started with some normal activity, which invariably went terribly wrong. She spoke with a Jewish accent and her catchphrase was "What a calamity!". Little Miss Calamity is an orange Little Miss with short brown hair, a dark green nose, a round rectangular body, and white sneakers.

In the US and UK versions Miss Calamity was voiced by Prudence Alcott and Aline Mowat, respectively. In the French version Miss Calamity was called Madame Calamité, and in the Portuguese version Miss Calamity was called Menina Calamidade.

She was phased out in Season 2 due to Chorion's dislike of the character for unknown reasons. (though a statue of her appeared in the Season 2 episode, "Trees") However, she did appear in a few graphic novels published after the series got cancelled.

=== Little Miss Carefree ===
Little Miss Carefree is part of the Little Miss series. Little Miss Carefree has a perfect life.

Little Miss Carefree has also been published under the alternative titles Madame Tout-Va-Bien (French), Η Κυρία Αισιόδοξη (Greek).

Little Miss Carefree along with Mr. Worry appeared in an InterCity advert.

=== Little Miss Careful ===
Little Miss Careful is part of the Little Miss series. Little Miss Careful is always cautious, and looks before Miss Careful leaps.

Little Miss Careful has been published under the alternative titles of Madame Prudente (French), Η Κυρία προσεκτική (Greek).

Little Miss Careful also appears in the book Little Miss Curious.

=== Little Miss Cawaii ===
Little Miss Cawaii was a Little Miss character who debuted in Japan sometime around 2011. Kawaii (misspelt "Cawaii") is the Japanese word for "cute".

=== Little Miss Chatterbox ===
Little Miss Chatterbox
- Author: Roger Hargreaves
- Illustrator: Roger Hargreaves
- Language: English
- Publication date: 10 January 1984
- Publication place: United Kingdom
- Pages: 34 pp
- ISBN: 978-0-7498-5238-2
- Preceded by: Little Miss Twins
- Followed by: Little Miss Dotty

Little Miss Chatterbox is the 16th book in the Little Miss series. Little Miss Chatterbox talks a lot, just like her brother, Mr. Chatterbox. Miss Chatterbox gets fired every time she works at a job. Miss Chatterbox then gets a job as a telephone worker who tells the time every second.

Little Miss Chatterbox is a recurring character in the 2008 TV series The Mr. Men Show. Miss Chatterbox keeps her looks and, as usual, Miss Chatterbox never shuts up. Miss Chatterbox annoys Mr. Grumpy, Mr. Stubborn and Mr. Rude with her talking. Her house is on top of a hill, and shaped like a telephone. In the US and UK versions, Miss Chatterbox is voiced by Katie Leigh and Teresa Gallagher respectively.

Little Miss Chatterbox appears under the titles Madame Bavarde (French), Doña Charlatana (Spanish), Unsere Polly Plaudertasche (German), Mevrouwtje Kletskous (Dutch), Láodāo Xiǎojiě (嘮叨小姐; Taiwan), Suda Yang (수다양; Korean), Η Κυρία Φλύαρη (Greek), גברת מדברת (Hebrew) and Menina Tagarela (Portuguese).

=== Little Miss Christmas ===
Little Miss Christmas
- Author: Adam Hargreaves
- Illustrator: Adam Hargreaves
- Language: English
- Series: Little Miss; Mr. Men & Little Miss Celebrations
- Publication date: 21 December 2005
- Publication place: United Kingdom
- Pages: 32 pp
- ISBN: 978-1-4052-2036-1

Little Miss Christmas is part of the Little Miss series and the Mr. Men & Little Miss Celebrations series. Little Miss Christmas loves Christmas, like her brother.

Little Miss Christmas has a green triangle-shaped body, a round yellow nose, and red hair worn in ponytails with sprigs of holly. Miss Christmas wears red gloves and two tone red and white shoes. Her Mr. Men counterpart is her brother Mr. Christmas.

Little Miss Christmas has also been published under the alternative titles of Madame Noël (French), Doña Navidad (Spanish) Unsere Weig Weihnachten (German), Η κυρία Χριστουγεννούλα (Greek), Menina Natal (Portuguese) and Lille Frøken Jul (Danish).

=== Little Miss Contrary ===
Little Miss Contrary
- Author: Roger Hargreaves
- Illustrator: Roger Hargreaves
- Language: English
- Publication date: 10 February 1984
- Publication place: United Kingdom
- Pages: 34 pp
- ISBN: 978-0-7498-5253-5
- Preceded by: Little Miss Fickle
- Followed by: Little Miss Busy

Little Miss Contrary is the 21st book in the Little Miss series. Miss Contrary is the final usual Little Miss created and published before Hargreaves's death. Little Miss Contrary always says the opposite of what Miss Contrary really means. Miss Contrary lives in Muddleland. Little Miss Contrary once heard a knock at the door, and it was Mr. Small. Mr. Small looked puzzled about the thoughts of her, who was trying to find her. On March 13, it was Mr. Happy's birthday. Miss Contrary then went to see some of Mr. Happy's friends (Mr. Greedy, Mr. Tickle, and Mr. Fussy). Little Miss Contrary had a perfect day, but being contrary, Miss Contrary said it was dreadful. At home, Mr. Happy remembered Little Miss Contrary's present, and opened it. The present was a pair of socks, but one was black and one was white. At the end of the book, Little Miss Contrary would say that it is the "beginning" of the story.

Little Miss Contrary has an orange round body, an orange round nose, and straight yellow hair. Miss Contrary wears glasses and a blue bow on the top of her head.

Little Miss Contrary appears under the titles Madame Contraire (French), Xiāngfǎn Xiǎojiě (相反小姐; Taiwan) and Η Κυρία Αντίθετη (Greek).

=== Little Miss Curious ===
Little Miss Curious
- Author: Viviane Cohen and Evelyne Lallemand
- Illustrator: Colette David
- Language: English
- Publication date: 1990 (France); 1994 (UK)
- Publication place: France; United Kingdom
- Pages: 34 pp
- ISBN: 978-0-7498-5251-1
- Preceded by: Little Miss Stubborn
- Followed by: Little Miss Fun

Little Miss Curious is the 28th book in the Little Miss series. Little Miss Curious wants to know everything. At the library, Miss Curious wanted a book about very curious things, though Miss Curious didn't get one. Miss Curious later ran off. Do you know where Miss Curious ran to? No; we are all very curious about that.

In the second season of The Mr. Men Show, Little Miss Curious kept her looks. Her bow resembles Little Miss Whoops' and her shape is changed from oval to square and a yellow nose. Her voice actresses are Cheryl Chase (credited as Sophie Roberts) and Claire Morgan, though her only speaking appearance was in "Trees".

Little Miss Curious is published under the alternative titles of Madame Pourquoi (French), Doña Curiosa (Spanish), Η Κυρία Περίεργη (Greek), Hàoqí Xiǎojiě (好奇小姐; Taiwan) and Hogisim Yang (호기심양; Korean).

== D ==
=== Little Miss Daredevil ===
Little Miss Daredevil
- Portrayed by: Katie Leigh (U.S.); Teresa Gallagher (UK)

Little Miss Daredevil is a new Little Miss character created for The Mr. Men Show. Little Miss Daredevil loves to go to extremes (and until Little Miss Bossy was added in season two, was unique in being the only Little Miss with eyelashes). Miss Daredevil loves fast cars, boats, bicycles and rockets; she even owns a collection of airplanes. On the comical side, her antics end up harming Mr. Quiet (and Miss Calamity once) in some way, and Mr. Quiet is almost always the guinea pig for her experiments. In the episode "Game Shows", Little Miss Daredevil had her own game show called I Dare You!. Her orange hair is hidden underneath her crash helmet but is briefly seen in "Gifts".

In the US and UK versions, Miss Daredevil is voiced by Katie Leigh and Teresa Gallagher respectively. In the French version Miss Daredevil is called Madame Supersonique, and in the Portuguese version Miss Daredevil is called Menina Destemida.

=== Little Miss Dotty ===
Little Miss Dotty
- Author: Roger Hargreaves
- Illustrator: Roger Hargreaves
- Language: English
- Publication date: 1984
- Publication place: United Kingdom
- Pages: 34 pp
- ISBN: 978-0-7498-5239-9
- Preceded by: Little Miss Chatterbox
- Followed by: Little Miss Lucky

Little Miss Dotty is the 17th book in the Little Miss series. Little Miss Dotty is just plain dotty. Miss Dotty lives in Nonsenseland (where Mr. Silly and Mr. Nonsense live), and has some pretty dotty ideas of her own.

Little Miss Dotty is published under the alternative titles of Little Miss Ditzy (USA), Madame Follette (French), Quèbān Xiǎojiě (雀斑小姐; Taiwan) and Η Κυρία Παλαβούλα (Greek).

== E ==
=== Little Miss Energy ===
Little Miss Energy was part of the show "50 Years of Mr. Men".

Miss Energy is named Madame Energie in French and Doña Energía in Spanish.

=== Little Miss Explorer ===
Little Miss Explorer is part of the books. Little Miss Explorer was made for London Heathrow Airport (LHR).

== F ==
=== Little Miss Fabulous ===
Little Miss Fabulous
- Author: Adam Hargreaves
- Illustrator: Adam Hargreaves
- Language: English; Japanese
- Series: Little Miss books
- Publication date: 26 July 2016
- Publication place: United States; United Kingdom; Japan
- Pages: 34 pp
- Preceded by: Little Miss Hug
- Followed by: Little Miss Sparkle

Little Miss Fabulous is the 36th book in the Little Miss series. Little Miss Fabulous has a fabulous sense of style and lots of confidence.

Little Miss Fabulous has an orange round-shaped body, and orange nose, and yellow hair that Miss Fabulous wears in a different style every day. Miss Fabulous wears turquoise platform high heels and carries a red handbag with a blue handle and a yellow star.

Little Miss Fabulous was originally planned to appear in The Mr. Men Show but was ultimately cut.

Little Miss Fabulous was published as Madame Fabuleuse in French and Doña Fabulosa in Spanish.

=== Little Miss Fashion ===
Little Miss Fashion is part of the "A Walk in Fashion" collab created by Michael Lau. Miss Fashion and Mr. Walk form the "Fashion Walk" together.

=== Little Miss Fickle ===
Little Miss Fickle
- Author: Roger Hargreaves
- Illustrator: Roger Hargreaves
- Language: English
- Publication date: 1984
- Publication place: United Kingdom
- Pages: 34 pp
- ISBN: 978-0-7498-5248-1
- Preceded by: Little Miss Star
- Followed by: Little Miss Contrary

Little Miss Fickle is the 20th book in the Little Miss series. Little Miss Fickle always has trouble making up her mind. Miss Fickle tries to find a book, but does not do the job well.

Little Miss Fickle has been published under the alternative titles of Madame Indécise (French), Unsere Ute Unentschieden (German), Juffertje Twijfel (Dutch), Shànbiàn Xiǎojiě (善變小姐; Taiwan), Byeondeok Yang (변덕양; Korean) and Η Κυρία Αναποφάσιστη (Greek).

=== Little Miss Fun ===
Little Miss Fun
- Author: Viviane Cohen and Evelyne Lallemand
- Illustrator: Colette David
- Language: English
- Publication date: 1990 (France); 1994 (UK)
- Publication place: France; United Kingdom
- Pages: 34 pp
- ISBN: 978-0-7498-5252-8
- Preceded by: Little Miss Curious
- Followed by: Little Miss Somersault

Little Miss Fun is the 29th book in the Little Miss series. Little Miss Fun loves to have fun all day, every day. Little Miss Fun has been published under the alternative titles of Madame Boute-en-train (French), Mevrouwtje Pret (Dutch) and Η Κυρία Ξένοιαστη (Greek).

== G ==
=== Little Miss Gap ===
Little Miss Gap is a female character that is based on the store GAP.

=== Little Miss Giggles ===
Little Miss Giggles
- Author: Roger Hargreaves
- Illustrator: Roger Hargreaves
- Language: English
- Publication date: 1984
- Publication place: United Kingdom
- Pages: 34 pp
- ISBN: 978-0-7498-5231-3
- Preceded by: Little Miss Greedy
- Followed by: Little Miss Twins

Little Miss Giggles is the 14th book in the Little Miss series. Little Miss Giggles can't stop giggling; Miss Giggles giggles so much that Miss Giggles makes everyone else giggle too. Little Miss Giggles seems to have a connection with Mr. Funny and Mr. Happy. Once during her daily walk Miss Giggles loses her giggle; Miss Giggles meets Mr. Happy, and they go to Dr. Makeyouwell. To solve the problem, Mr. Happy gives Little Miss Giggles a "giggle".

Miss Giggles appeared in The Mr. Men Show in season two; Miss Giggles was voiced by Rebecca Forstadt (credited as Reba West) in the US version and Claire Morgan in the UK. Miss Giggles looked exactly as she did in the books (except for being a darker shade of blue), and sometimes her giggling got out of control.

Little Miss Giggles has been published under the alternative titles of Madame Risette (French), Doña Risitas (Spanish), Unsere Inge Immerfroh (German), Mevrouwtje Giechel (Dutch), Xiàoxīxī xiǎojiě (笑嘻嘻小姐; Taiwan), Useum Yang (웃음양; Korean), Η Κυρία Χαχανούλα (Greek) and Menina Risonha (Portuguese).

=== Little Miss Ginger ===
Little Miss Ginger is part of the Little Miss Spice Girls series. The character is based on Ginger Spice of the pop group Spice Girls.

=== Little Miss Greedy ===
Little Miss Greedy
- Author: Roger Hargreaves
- Illustrator: Roger Hargreaves
- Language: English
- Publication date: 1 September 1981
- Publication place: United Kingdom
- Pages: 34 pp
- ISBN: 978-0-7498-5247-4
- Preceded by: Little Miss Scatterbrain
- Followed by: Little Miss Magic

Little Miss Greedy is the 12th book in the Little Miss series. Little Miss Greedy has the same appetite as her cousin, Mr. Greedy, and has a really large breakfast. Miss Greedy also goes to Mr. Greedy's birthday party.

Little Miss Greedy was originally published under the title of Little Miss Plump; following Hargreaves' death, the name was changed. Perhaps, it was due to fears that "plump" was too offensive. Part of the story was also altered to fit with the change.

Little Miss Greedy has been published under the alternative titles of Madame Dodue (French), Doña Rechoncha (Spanish), Pàng Dūdū Xiǎojiě (胖嘟嘟小姐; Taiwan), Η Κυρία Φαγανούλα (Greek) and Unsere Rosi Rundlich (German).

== H ==
=== Little Miss Helpful ===
Little Miss Helpful
- Author: Roger Hargreaves
- Illustrator: Roger Hargreaves
- Language: English
- Series: Little Miss
- Publication date: 1 September 1981
- Publication place: United Kingdom
- Pages: 34 pp
- ISBN: 978-0-7498-5232-0
- Preceded by: Little Miss Trouble
- Followed by: Little Miss Shy

Little Miss Helpful is the 7th book in the Little Miss series. Little Miss Helpful tries to help everyone, but ends up making everything worse. Miss Helpful tries to tie Mr. Tall's shoelaces, and ends up tying both shoes together. Then Miss Helpful tries to help Mr. Happy when Mr. Happy is sick by getting the cleaning supplies, but her head gets stuck in the bucket and Miss Helpful is trapped in the refrigerator. Mr. Happy tries to pull the bucket off Miss Helpful's head, only to have him go flying into the lake.

In the 2008 TV series, The Mr. Men Show, Little Miss Helpful had a makeover. Miss Helpful kept her personality, colour and oval body; however, the pigtails replaced her mini-buns, Miss Helpful had green bows on her ginger hair and wore a green fanny pack. Her shoes were changed (same sneakers as Miss Busy), and her nose changed from yellow to pink. Her catchphrase was, "Just trying to be helpful!" Unlike her print character Miss Helpful actually gives helpful information, but it is sometimes misleading or told at the wrong time. Miss Helpful also causes pain to other clumsy Mr. Men and Little Misses such as Little Miss Calamity, Mr. Bump, Little Miss Whoops, and even Mr. Quiet. Little Miss Helpful speaks with a Southern accent in the US dub and a Neutral English accent in the UK dub. In the US and UK versions, Miss Helpful is voiced by Katie Leigh, Jo Wyatt (season 1) and Emma Tate (season 2).

Little Miss Helpful also stars in Little Miss Helpful at the Fair and Little Miss Helpful and the Green House

=== Little Miss Hug ===
Little Miss Hug
- Author: Adam Hargreaves
- Illustrator: Adam Hargreaves
- Language: Japanese; English
- Series: Mr. Men
- Genre: Children's literature
- Publication date: 8 May 2014
- Publication place: Japan; United Kingdom
- Pages: 34 pp
- Preceded by: Little Miss Princess
- Followed by: Little Miss Fabulous

Little Miss Hug is the 35th book in the Little Miss series. Little Miss Hug's favorite thing in the world is giving hugs, and Miss Hug is always on hand to give people a hug when they need it. Her extra special arms make her hugs extra special. Her catchphrase is "Everyone needs a hug."

Little Miss Hug has a pink heart-shaped body and darker pink hair. Miss Hug wears red shoes with white trim and has a red bow and daisies in her hair. Little Miss Hug was the first heart-shaped character.

She also appears in an activity book alongside Hello Kitty called Little Miss Hug and Hello Kitty: Best Friends.

Little Miss Hug has been published under the alternative titles of Madame Câlin (French), Unsere Kelly Knuddel (German), Doña Abrazo (Spanish), Η κυρία Αγκαλίτσα (Greek), Mała Przylepa (Polish), ハグちゃん (Japanese), and גברת חיבוק (Hebrew).

== I ==
=== Little Miss Inventor ===
Little Miss Inventor
- Author: Adam Hargreaves
- Illustrator: Adam Hargreaves
- Language: English
- Publication date: 8 March 2018
- Publication place: United Kingdom
- Pages: 34 pp
- Preceded by: Little Miss Sparkle
- Followed by: Little Miss Brave

Little Miss Inventor is the 38th book in the Little Miss series. Little Miss Inventor is as bright as a button. In fact, Miss Inventor is as bright as two buttons and can invent the most extraordinary things for her friends. But the challenge of inventing something for Mr. Rude has her temporarily stumped. There was also a contest that involved making a machine that would help Mr. Bump stop getting into accidents. The top inventions were in the book.

Little Miss Inventor has a yellow round-shaped body, a blue nose, and green curly hair with tools and pencils in it. Miss Inventor wears glasses.

Little Miss Inventor also appears in the book "Little Miss Inventor and the Robots", with her as the star.

Little Miss Inventor has been published under the alternative titles Madame Invention (French), Doña Inventora (Spanish), Η κυρία Εφευρετική (Greek), and גברת ממציאה (Hebrew).

== J ==
=== Little Miss Jealous ===
Little Miss Jealous is part of the Little Miss series. Little Miss Jealous is jealous of everything and everyone.

== K ==
=== Little Miss Kind ===
Little Miss Kind was part of the show "50 Years of Mr. Men".

== L ==
=== Little Miss Late ===
Little Miss Late
- Author: Roger Hargreaves
- Illustrator: Roger Hargreaves
- Language: English
- Publication date: 1 September 1981
- Publication place: United Kingdom
- Pages: 34 pp
- ISBN: 978-0-7498-5240-5
- Preceded by: Little Miss Splendid
- Followed by: Little Miss Scatterbrain

Little Miss Late is the 10th book in the Little Miss series. Little Miss Late is late for everything, and can't find a job. Miss Late tries to work in a bank, but by the time Miss Late gets there the bank has closed. Miss Late tries to be a secretary for Mr. Uppity, but Mr. Uppity goes home late. Miss Late finally gets a job as a housemaid for Mr. Lazy, because Mr. Lazy does things at the wrong time.

Little Miss Late has been published under the alternative titles of Madame En Retard (French), Doña Tardona (Spanish), Unsere Uschi Unpünktlich (German), Mevrouwtje Te Laat (Dutch), Η Κυρία Αργοπορίδου (Greek), Chídào Xiǎojiě (遲到小姐; Taiwan) and Neujeo Yang (늦어양; Korean).

=== Little Miss Loud ===
Little Miss Loud is part of the Little Miss series. Little Miss Loud lives in Loudland and, like Mr Noisy, Miss Loud is very loud indeed. Little Miss Loud has been published under the alternative titles of Madame Tintamarre (French) and Η Κυρία Φωνακλού (Greek). Like Little Miss Show-Off, Miss Loud appears in the book Mr. Brave. Her former name is Little Miss Laugh.

=== Little Miss Lucky ===
Little Miss Lucky
- Author: Roger Hargreaves
- Illustrator: Roger Hargreaves
- Language: English
- Publication date: 1984
- Publication place: United Kingdom
- Pages: 34 pp
- ISBN: 978-0-7498-5235-1
- Preceded by: Little Miss Dotty
- Followed by: Little Miss Star

Little Miss Lucky is the 18th book in the Little Miss series. Little Miss Lucky lives in Horseshoe Cottage, on top of a hill. Miss Lucky settles in bed with a book Miss Lucky has bought. Then Miss Lucky hears a knock at the door, and goes downstairs to answer it. Miss Lucky gets locked out of the house, a gust of wind blows her off her feet, and Miss Lucky lands on a haystack. However, a tree starts chasing her. Miss Lucky then wakes up to find out that it was all a dream, and that is why her story's called Little Miss Lucky.

Little Miss Lucky has appears under the titles Madame Chance (French), Doña Suerte (Spanish), Η Κυρία Τυχερούλα (Greek), Haeng-un Yang (행운양; Korean) and Xìngyùn Xiǎojiě (幸運小姐; Taiwan).

== M ==
=== Little Miss Magic ===
Little Miss Magic
- Author: Roger Hargreaves
- Illustrator: Roger Hargreaves
- Language: English
- Publication date: 1982
- Publication place: United Kingdom
- Pages: 40 pp
- ISBN: 978-1-84646-236-8
- Preceded by: Little Miss Greedy
- Followed by: Little Miss Giggles

Little Miss Magic is the 13th book in the Little Miss series. Little Miss Magic is the resident magician. Once, Little Miss Magic got out of bed and told her toothpaste tube to squeeze. Then Mr. Happy came over (looking exactly the opposite) to complain about Mr Tickle, because Mr. Tickle was tickling all the time. Little Miss Magic shrank Mr. Tickle's arms and told him to come to her house the next day. When Mr. Tickle came over she said, "One tickle a day" (meaning on Mr. Happy). Unfortunately for her, Mr. Tickle used his "one tickle a day" on her instead.

Little Miss Magic appeared on The Mr. Men Show (season two). Miss Magic kept her goldish colour, round body, yellow nose and brown hair; a black top-hat with a pink flower replaced her green striped bow, fuchsia Mary Janes with sparkles replaced her red sneakers and her freckles were gone. As Little Miss Magic isn't used to more complex spells, her magic was also very defective – often producing unnecessary results at the most inappropriate times when a practical solution was needed (such as turning Little Miss Daredevil into a goat while trying to cure her of hiccups). She speaks with a Scottish accent in the US dub and an Irish accent in the UK dub. Her catchphrases are, "Sometimes my magic surprises even me!" and "Isn't it amazing?". On the Mr. Men website Little Miss Magic says, "Ta-da! Magic!" Her voice actresses are Prudence Alcott (US) and Emma Tate (UK). Little Miss Magic has been published under the alternative titles of Madame Magie (French), Doña Brujilla (Spanish), Unsere Hollie Hokuspokus (German), Shénqí Xiǎojiě (神奇小姐; Taiwan), Masul Yang (마술양; Korean) and Η Κυρία Αμπρακατάμπρα (Greek).

=== Little Miss Marple ===
Little Miss Marple is a new character created as homage to Agatha Christie's fictional detective Miss Marple, who appears in the 2025 book Muddle at the Vicarage. She is a round, purple Little Miss with white curly hair, wearing a cream sunhat and brown high heeled shoes. In addition, a new Mr Man character, Mr. Poirot, was revealed alongside Little Miss Marple.

=== Little Miss Miracle ===
Little Miss Miracle was a Little Miss character used for Miracle beauty cream.

== N ==
=== Little Miss Naughty ===
Little Miss Naughty
- Author: Roger Hargreaves
- Illustrator: Roger Hargreaves
- Language: English
- Publication date: 1 September 1981
- Publication place: United Kingdom
- Pages: 34 pp
- ISBN: 978-0-85985-179-4
- Preceded by: Little Miss Bossy
- Followed by: Little Miss Neat

Little Miss Naughty is the 2nd book in the Little Miss series. Little Miss Naughty loves to play practical jokes. Miss Naughty awakens one day, thinking it looks like a good day for being naughty. Miss Naughty knocks Mr. Uppity's hat off his head, breaks Mr. Clever's glasses, and strips Mr. Bump of his bandages (placing them on Mr. Small). The Mr. Men hold a meeting to decide what to do. Mr. Small meets with Mr. Impossible (who can make himself invisible); each time Little Miss Naughty tries to do something naughty, Mr. Impossible tweaks her nose and it cures Little Miss Naughty of her naughtiness.

In the 2008 TV series, The Mr. Men Show, Miss Naughty kept her purple colour and oval body but now had curly pink hair, a dark-fuchsia nose, pink rosy cheeks (emphasizing her character trait) and her bow was a lighter shade of green. Her catchphrase was, "Sometimes I just can't help myself". Occasionally, her pranks backfire on her. Miss Naughty has a Romanian accent similar to Natasha Fatale from The Rocky and Bullwinkle Show in the US and a Bristol accent in the UK. In the US and UK versions, Miss Naughty is voiced by Alicyn Packard, Jo Wyatt (season 1) and Teresa Gallagher (season 2).

Little Miss Naughty has been published under the alternative titles of Madame Canaille (French), Doña Traviesilla (Spanish), Unsere Ulla Ungezogen (German), Mevrouwtje Stout (Dutch), Η Κυρία Ατακτούλα (Greek), Jangnan Yang (장난양; Korean), Táoqì Xiǎojiě (淘氣小姐; Taiwan) and Menina Marota (Portuguese).

=== Little Miss Neat ===
Little Miss Neat
- Author: Roger Hargreaves
- Illustrator: Roger Hargreaves
- Language: English
- Publication date: 1 September 1981
- Publication place: United Kingdom
- Pages: 34 pp
- ISBN: 978-0-85985-181-7
- Preceded by: Little Miss Naughty
- Followed by: Little Miss Sunshine

Little Miss Neat is the 3rd book in the Little Miss series. Little Miss Neat is as neat as two pins, and lives in Twopin Cottage. When Miss Neat goes on holiday, Mr. Muddle comes to visit her empty house. Mr. Muddle makes a cup of tea, putting everything back in the wrong place. When Little Miss Neat comes home Miss Neat can't find anything, and when Miss Neat sits in a chair Miss Neat is pricked by forks, knives, and spoons that Mr. Muddle placed there. Hargreaves tells the reader, "I don't think Little Miss Neat will be taking a holiday next year. Do you?".

Little Miss Neat has been published under the alternative titles of Madame Proprette (French), Doña Ordenada (Spanish), Unsere Sofie Säuberlich (German), Η Κυρία Καθαρή (Greek), Zhěngjié Xiǎojiě (整潔小姐; Taiwan) and Kkalkkeum Yang (깔끔양; Korean).

=== Little Miss Nobody ===
Little Miss Nobody is a character who appears in Little Miss Stella's book. Miss Nobody appears to be similar to Mr. Nobody.

== P ==
=== Little Miss Penny ===
Little Miss Penny is one of the children of Mr. Thrifty and Mrs. Thrifty who is in the Mr. Spendy book.

=== Little Miss Plump ===
See Little Miss Greedy.

=== Little Miss Pretty ===
Little Miss Pretty is part of the Little Miss series, and is formerly known as Little Miss Vain. Little Miss Pretty lives in Prettyville. Her beauty would make Little Miss Splendid jealous.

Little Miss Pretty has a blue body, a yellow nose, curly yellow hair, and pink cheeks. Miss Pretty wears silver shoes, gloves, a silver bow, and carries a matching handbag.

Little Miss Pretty has been published under the alternative titles of Madame Coquette (French) and Η Κυρία Κοκέτα (Greek).

=== Little Miss Prim ===
Little Miss Prim is part of the Little Miss series. Little Miss Prim is always proper. Miss Prim is never out of character, and feels lost without her purse.

Little Miss Prim has also been published under the alternative titles of Madame Collet-Monté (French) and Η Kυρια Καθωσπρεπει (Greek).

=== Little Miss Princess ===
Little Miss Princess
- Author: Adam Hargreaves
- Illustrator: Adam Hargreaves
- Language: English; Japanese
- Series: Mr. Men
- Genre: Children's literature
- Publication date: 25 March 2011
- Publication place: United Kingdom; Japan
- Pages: 34 pp
- Preceded by: Little Miss Whoops
- Followed by: Little Miss Hug

Little Miss Princess is the 34th book in the Little Miss series. The book was published in spring 2011 to mark the 40th anniversary of the Mr. Men. Little Miss Princess lives in a big castle with turrets and a moat, and Little Miss Princess has people catering for her, but Little Miss Princess isn't rude and spoiled. Miss Princess is a kind and generous, good-hearted princess. One day, Miss Princess decides to help an injured Mr. Bump, but as you can imagine, Little Miss Princess isn't used to doing things herself, so everything doesn't quite go to plan. Little Miss Princess has been published under the alternative titles of Madame Princesse (French), Doña Princesa (Spanish) and Η κυρία Καλομαθημένη (Greek).

=== Little Miss Prudence ===
Little Miss Prudence is one of Mr. and Mrs. Thrifty's children who appear in the Mr. Spendy book.

== Q ==
=== Little Miss Quick ===
Little Miss Quick
- Author: Viviane Cohen and Evelyne Lallemand
- Illustrator: Colette David
- Language: English
- Publication date: 1990 (France); 1994 (UK)
- Publication place: France; United Kingdom
- Pages: 34 pp
- ISBN: 978-0-7498-5244-3
- Preceded by: Little Miss Busy
- Followed by: Little Miss Wise

Little Miss Quick is the 23rd book in the Little Miss series. Like Mr. Rush, Little Miss Quick is always in a hurry and did not even have time to finish tying a bow in her hair. Miss Quick does everything very carelessly around town.

Little Miss Quick has been published under the alternative titles of Madame Vite-fait (French) and Η Κυρία Φουριόζα (Greek).

== S ==
=== Little Miss Scary ===
Little Miss Scary
- Author: Adam Hargreaves
- Illustrator: Adam Hargreaves
- Language: English
- Publication date: 3 April 2003
- Publication place: United Kingdom
- Pages: 34 pp
- ISBN: 978-0-7498-5852-0
- Preceded by: Little Miss Somersault
- Followed by: Little Miss Bad

Little Miss Scary is the 31st book in the Little Miss series. Little Miss Scary enjoys scaring people, especially Mr. Jelly. However, Miss Scary has not reckoned with Mr. Jelly's friend, Mr. Noisy.

In the 2008 TV series, The Mr. Men Show, Little Miss Scary kept her looks, except one of her spikes is gone and she is a darker shade of red. She is a regular character. She loves fear, has her own television show, Miss Scary's Late Night Scare Fest, and is assisted by Mr. Bounce. Her house is a haunted house in the middle of the woods. Miss Scary has a collection of assorted masks (which are modified in season two) which she uses to scare the other Mr. Men and Little Misses, although they can frighten her as well. Miss Scary has a scary snore (as seen in the episode, "Sleep"). Little Miss Scary snorts when Miss Scary laughs. Miss Scary is also a fairy in some episodes. In the UK version, Miss Scary is voiced by Susan Balboni and Jo Wyatt (Series 1) and Alex Kelly (Series 2).

Little Miss Scary has also been published under the alternative title of Madame Terreur (French), Doña Bú (Spanish), and Menina Susto (Portuguese).

=== Little Miss Scary (Little Miss Spice Girls) ===
Little Miss Scary is part of the Little Miss Spice Girls series. The character is based on Scary Spice of the pop group Spice Girls.

=== Little Miss Scatterbrain ===
Little Miss Scatterbrain
- Author: Roger Hargreaves
- Illustrator: Roger Hargreaves
- Language: English
- Publication date: 1 September 1981
- Publication place: United Kingdom
- Pages: 34 pp
- ISBN: 978-0-7498-5241-2
- Preceded by: Little Miss Late
- Followed by: Little Miss Greedy

Little Miss Scatterbrain is the 11th book in the Little Miss series. Little Miss Scatterbrain is the least intelligent woman in the world – even less intelligent than Mr. Dizzy.

Little Miss Scatterbrain was also released as a follow-along audio book, featuring a show-tune-style musical number at the end.

Little Miss Scatterbrain was also the subject of a PC CD-ROM learning game for children, called "The Adventures of Little Miss Scatterbrain". It was published in 2002 by E.M.M.E. Interactive SA and developed by Hyptique.

Little Miss Scatterbrain has been published under the alternative titles of Madame Tete-en-l'air (French), Doña Despistada (Spanish), Η Κυρία Ξεμυαλισμένη (Greek), Míhú Xiǎojiě (迷糊小姐; Taiwan) and Menina Distraída (Portuguese).

=== Little Miss Show-Off ===
Little Miss Show-Off is part of the Little Miss series, and is formerly known as Little Miss Selfish. Little Miss Show-Off is green; Miss Show-off has a red nose, yellow shoes, blue gloves and a yellow, blue and pink hat. Miss Show-Off doesn't like to share anything with anyone. The only thing Miss Show-Off ever thinks about is herself (hence her two names).

Little Miss Show-Off has been published under the alternative titles of Madame Moi-Je (French) and Η Kυρία Εγώ (Greek).

Like Little Miss Loud, Miss Show-Off appears in the book Mr. Brave. Her French name is translated to Little Miss Me-I.

=== Little Miss Shy ===
Little Miss Shy
- Author: Roger Hargreaves
- Illustrator: Roger Hargreaves
- Language: English
- Publication date: 1 September 1981
- Publication place: United Kingdom
- Pages: 34 pp
- ISBN: 978-0-7498-5234-4
- Preceded by: Little Miss Helpful
- Followed by: Little Miss Splendid

Little Miss Shy is the 8th book in the Little Miss series. Little Miss Shy is blue with black hair, and has pink cheeks. Little Miss Shy is afraid of everything, and hardly goes out. Miss Shy grows her own food in the garden. One day Miss Shy receives an invitation to Mr. Funny's party, and keeps changing her mind about whether or not to go. Then Mr. Funny arrives and escorts her to the party; Miss Shy has fun and meets Mr. Quiet, who used to be shy like her.

Little Miss Shy is also published under the alternative titles of Madame Timide (French), Doña Tímida (Spanish), Unsere Susi Schüchtern (German), Η Κυρία Ντροπαλή (Greek), Hàixiū Xiǎojiě (害羞小姐; Taiwan) and Bukkeureom Yang (부끄럼양; Korean).

=== Little Miss Somersault ===
Little Miss Somersault
- Author: Viviane Cohen and Evelyne Lallemand
- Illustrator: Colette David
- Language: English
- Publication date: 1990 (France); 1994 (UK)
- Publication place: France; United Kingdom
- Pages: 34 pp
- ISBN: 978-0-7498-5254-2
- Preceded by: Little Miss Fun
- Followed by: Little Miss Scary

Little Miss Somersault is the 30th book in the Little Miss series. Little Miss Somersault is incredibly agile. When Miss Somersault goes for a walk, Miss Somersault cartwheels instead. Instead of going through the front door, Miss Somersault climbs onto the roof first. Instead of sitting in a chair while eating her lunch, Miss Somersault balances on the back of it. Miss Somersault jumps over Mr. Small's house, and talks on the telephone with one leg up. Miss Somersault gets the leaves off Mr. Worry's roof, but Mr. Worry has the ladder. Little Miss Somersault doesn't need a ladder to climb up on the roof. Mr. Skinny paints the roof of his house; Mr. Bump bumps into the ladder (causing the paint to spill) but Mr. Skinny is rescued by Miss Somersault. The next day, everyone has heard about her daring deeds. Mr. Uppity calls her on the phone about the umbrella stuck in the chimney, and expects her in five minutes. It takes no time to climb onto Mr. Uppity's roof and get onto the chimney, but Miss Somersault is afraid of heights. Mr. Tickle brings Miss Somersault back down, and looks for someone else to tickle. Someone talks to her on the phone about their hat which has blown off onto the roof, and her face turns pale because Miss Somersault does not want to climb, but it is actually Mr. Small. Being relieved, off she somersaults.

Little Miss Somersault has been published under the alternative titles of Madame Acrobate (French), Doña Voltereta (Spanish), Η Κυρία Λαστιχένια (Greek), Fān Jīndǒu Xiǎojiě (翻筋斗小姐; Taiwan) and Jaejuneomgi Yang (재주넘기양; Korean).

=== Little Miss Sparkle ===
Little Miss Sparkle
- Author: Adam Hargreaves
- Illustrator: Adam Hargreaves
- Language: English
- Publication date: 4 October 2016
- Publication place: United States; United Kingdom
- Pages: 34 pp
- Preceded by: Little Miss Fabulous
- Followed by: Little Miss Inventor

Little Miss Sparkle is the 37th book in the Little Miss series. Little Miss Sparkle loves to dance and sparkled when Miss Sparkle danced even more. During a week, Miss Sparkle lost her sparkle and asks Mr. Silly to help. Because of his silliness, Miss Sparkle laughed more until Miss Sparkle was all better.

Little Miss Sparkle has a yellow star-shaped body with white sparkles, freckles, and a pink nose. Miss Sparkle wears a blue bow and pink shoes.

Little Miss Sparkle has been published under the alternative titles Madame Lumineuse (French), Doña Luminosa (Spanish), and Η κυρία Λαμπερή (Greek).

=== Little Miss Splendid ===
Little Miss Splendid
- Author: Roger Hargreaves
- Illustrator: Roger Hargreaves
- Language: English
- Publication date: 1 September 1981
- Publication place: United Kingdom
- Pages: 34 pp
- ISBN: 978-0-7498-5236-8
- Preceded by: Little Miss Shy
- Followed by: Little Miss Late

Little Miss Splendid is the 9th book in the Little Miss series. Little Miss Splendid lives in a mansion with a golden bathtub, and thinks Miss Splendid is better than everyone else. When Miss Splendid goes to town and sees a new hat in a store window that Miss Splendid thinks Miss Splendid simply must have, Miss Splendid buys it. When Miss Splendid is walking home and her friends ask her if Miss Splendid wants to take the bus, Miss Splendid refuses – but then it starts to rain, and then her new hat gets ruined.

Little Miss Splendid has been published under the alternative titles of Madame Beauté (French), Doña Presumida (Spanish), Xūróng Xiǎojiě (虛榮小姐; Taiwan), Meotjyeo Yang (멋져양; Korean) and Η Κυρία Ψηλομύτα (Greek).

=== Little Miss Sporty ===
Little Miss Sporty is part of the Little Miss Spice Girls series. The character is based on Sporty Spice of the pop group Spice Girls.

=== Little Miss Star ===
Little Miss Star
- Author: Roger Hargreaves
- Illustrator: Roger Hargreaves
- Language: English
- Publication date: 1984
- Publication place: United Kingdom
- Pages: 34 pp
- ISBN: 978-0-7498-5242-9
- Preceded by: Little Miss Lucky
- Followed by: Little Miss Fickle

Little Miss Star is the 19th book in the Little Miss series. Little Miss Star wants to be popular more than anything. Miss Star goes to see a man (we can only see his long legs; it is later revealed to be Roger Hargreaves), and the next day Miss Star walks past a shop window and sees her book (Little Miss Star, by Roger Hargreaves) in the window. This is the second Little Miss/Mr. Men book to break the fourth wall (the first was Mr. Small).

Little Miss Star has also been published under the alternative titles of Madame Vedette (French), Doña Famosa (Spanish), Η Κυρία Διάσημη (Greek), Míngxīng Xiǎojiě (明星小姐; Taiwan) and Seuta Yang (스타양; Korean).

=== Little Miss Stella ===
Little Miss Stella is part of the Little Miss series of books. Miss Stella is based on a real person: Stella McCartney, a fashion designer and daughter of rock star Paul McCartney and the late Linda McCartney. The book was produced in a limited edition of 1000 books as a fashion-show invitation. Can Little Miss Stella help Little Miss Nobody be somebody?

=== Little Miss Stubborn ===
Little Miss Stubborn
- Author: Viviane Cohen and Evelyne Lallemand
- Illustrator: Colette David
- Language: English
- Publication date: 1990 (France); 1994 (UK)
- Publication place: France; United Kingdom
- Pages: 31 pp
- ISBN: 978-1-4176-0369-5
- Preceded by: Little Miss Brainy
- Followed by: Little Miss Curious

Little Miss Stubborn is the 27th book in the Little Miss series. She is the most stubborn character of all in the Mr. Men series. Sometimes it was good for Little Miss Stubborn to be stubborn.

Little Miss Stubborn has also been published under the titles of Madame Têtue (French), Doña Cabezota (Spanish), Η Κυρία Πεισματάρα (Greek), Gùzhí Xiǎojiě (固執小姐; Taiwan), Gojibse Yang (고집세양; Korean) and Menina Teimosa (Portuguese).

=== Little Miss Sunshine ===
Little Miss Sunshine
- Author: Roger Hargreaves
- Illustrator: Roger Hargreaves
- Language: English
- Publication date: 1 September 1981
- Publication place: United Kingdom
- Pages: 34 pp
- ISBN: 978-0-85985-183-1
- Preceded by: Little Miss Neat
- Followed by: Little Miss Tiny

Little Miss Sunshine is the 4th book in the Little Miss series by Roger Hargreaves. There was a king who lived in a castle in Miseryland. Little Miss Sunshine was on vacation. Miss Sunshine saw a sign saying, "This way to Miseryland", so Miss Sunshine went to Miseryland and saw a guard at the bridge door. Little Miss Sunshine gave the guard a big smile; the guard took her to see the King of Miseryland. Miss Sunshine had an idea, and Little Miss Sunshine and the king went back to her car. Miss Sunshine made a new sign saying, "Laughterland"; Miss Sunshine laughed, and the king laughed too.

Little Miss Sunshine is a regular in the 2008 TV series The Mr. Men Show. Miss Sunshine keeps her looks and personality (except her hair and nose changed from yellow to light tan) and now runs a morning show called "Good Morning Dillydale" with Mr. Happy. Her house is pink with a flowerbed, and flowers on the house as well. Miss Sunshine is also shown to like being tickled, as Miss Sunshine had allowed Mr. Tickle to do so in a few episodes and on the website when rolled over him. Miss Sunshine also has a Californian accent in the US dub and a Neutral English accent in the UK dub. In the UK and US versions, Miss Sunshine is voiced by Alicyn Packard, Jo Wyatt (season one) and Emma Tate (season two). Little Miss Sunshine's name and picture have been featured on many clothing designs, including track pants and sweaters.

Little Miss Sunshine has been published under the alternative titles of Madame Bonheur (French), Doña Sonrisas (Spanish), Unsere Sonja Sonnenschein (German), Mevrouwtje Zonnestraal (Dutch), Η Κυρία Γελαστούλα (Greek), Lèguān Xiǎojiě (樂觀小姐; Taiwan), Balga Yang (밝아양; Korean) and Menina Alegria (Portuguese).

Little Miss Sunshine also stars in Little Miss Sunshine and the Wicked Witch, which was a 2006 special edition book, Little Miss Sunshine keeps her smile, which was also a 2006 special edition book, and appears in numerous other Mr Men books.

=== Little Miss Surprise ===
Little Miss Surprise
- Author: Adam Hargreaves
- Illustrator: Adam Hargreaves
- Language: English
- Series: Little Miss
- Genre: Children's literature
- Publisher: Egmont Books
- Publication date: 12 September 2024
- Publication place: United Kingdom
- Pages: 34 pp
- Preceded by: Little Miss Brave

Little Miss Surprise is the 40th book in the Little Miss series by Roger Hargreaves and the tenth one created by Adam Hargreaves.

She is purple with curly pink hair with hair bows, flowers, a star, and a pair of fake eyes in it. She wears black sneakers with white soles and rainbow striped socks.

== T ==
=== Little Miss Thrifty ===
Little Miss Thrifty (Mrs. Thrifty) is part of the Mr. Spendy book and is the wife of Mr. Thrifty.

=== Little Miss Tidy ===
Little Miss Tidy
- Author: Viviane Cohen and Evelyne Lallemand
- Illustrator: Colette David
- Language: English
- Publication date: 1990 (France); 1994 (UK)
- Publication place: France; United Kingdom
- Pages: 34 pp
- ISBN: 978-0-7498-5246-7
- Preceded by: Little Miss Wise
- Followed by: Little Miss Brainy

Little Miss Tidy is the 25th book in the Little Miss series. Little Miss Tidy loves to keep things neat and clean, and puts her things in boxes of any kind.

Little Miss Tidy has a yellow round-shaped body and brown hair in worn pigtails with blue bows. Miss Tidy wears fuchsia high heels and carries a fuchsia and blue striped handbag.

Little Miss Tidy has been published under the alternative titles of Madame Range-tout (French), Zhěngqí Xiǎojiě (整齊小姐; Taiwan) and Η Κυρία Τακτική (Greek).

=== Little Miss Tiny ===
Little Miss Tiny
- Author: Roger Hargreaves
- Illustrator: Roger Hargreaves
- Language: English
- Publication date: 1 September 1981
- Publication place: United Kingdom
- Pages: 34 pp
- ISBN: 978-0-86592-602-8
- Preceded by: Little Miss Sunshine
- Followed by: Little Miss Trouble

Little Miss Tiny is the 5th book in the Little Miss series. Little Miss Tiny isn't just small, Miss Tiny's tiny. Little Miss Tiny is tinier than Mr. Small. Little Miss Tiny is picked on because Miss Tiny is so small. The story begins when Little Miss Tiny wakes up, exits the mouse hole, and explores outdoors. Miss Tiny gets frightened by the large animals but Mr. Strong can hear her, and rescues her.

Little Miss Tiny has also been published under the titles Madame Petite (French), Doña Menudita (Spanish), Unsere Dora Däumling (German), Η Κυρία Τοσοδούλα (Greek), Línglóng Xiǎojiě (玲瓏小姐; Taiwan) and Bamtol Yang (밤톨양; Korean).

=== Little Miss Trouble ===
Little Miss Trouble
- Author: Roger Hargreaves
- Illustrator: Roger Hargreaves
- Language: English
- Publication date: 1 September 1981
- Publication place: United Kingdom
- Pages: 34 pp
- ISBN: 978-0-7498-5230-6
- Preceded by: Little Miss Tiny
- Followed by: Little Miss Helpful

Little Miss Trouble is the 6th book in the Little Miss series. Little Miss Trouble is a prankster like Mr. Mischief. Miss Trouble uses Mr. Uppity and Mr. Clever to trick Mr. Small, and Mr. Small gets two unnecessary black eyes. Mr. Small talks to Dr. Makeyouwell; Mr. Small uses Mr. Tickle and Mr. Bump to trick Little Miss Trouble. They tickle and bump her, and after that, Miss Trouble gets a taste of her own medicine.

Little Miss Trouble has been published under the alternative titles of Madame Chipie (French), Doña Problemas (Spanish), Unsere Frieda Frech (German), Η Κυρία Ανακατωσούρα (Greek), Golchi Yang (골치양; Korean) and Xiǎo Máfan Xiǎojiě (小麻煩小姐; Taiwan).

=== Little Miss Twins ===
Little Miss Twins
- Author: Roger Hargreaves
- Illustrator: Roger Hargreaves
- Language: English
- Publication date: 1984
- Publication place: United Kingdom
- Pages: 34 pp
- ISBN: 978-0-7498-5237-5
- Preceded by: Little Miss Giggles
- Followed by: Little Miss Chatterbox

Little Miss Twins is the 15th book in the Little Miss series. Little Miss Twins do everything in pairs, and say their last words twice. Miss Twins live in Twoland. Little Miss Twins were inspired by Roger Hargreaves' twin daughters.

Little Miss Twins has also been published under the titles of Madame Double (French), Doñas Dobles (Spanish), SSangdung-i Yang (쌍둥이양; Korean), Shuāngbāotāi Xiǎojiě (雙胞胎小姐; Taiwan) and H Κυρία Διδυμούλα (Greek).

== U ==
=== Little Miss Unbelievable ===
Little Miss Unbelievable is from the Uniqlo clothing brand.

== V ==
=== Little Miss Valentine ===
Little Miss Valentine
- Author: Adam Hargreaves
- Illustrator: Adam Hargreaves
- Language: English
- Series: Little Miss
- Publication date: 24 December 2019
- Publication place: United States; United Kingdom
- Pages: 32 pp
- ISBN: 978-1-5247-9360-9

Little Miss Valentine is part of the Little Miss series.

Little Miss Valentine represents the holiday Valentine's Day. Miss Valentine has a red heart-shaped body, a blue nose, freckles, and red hair worn in braided pigtails with yellow bows. Little Miss Valentine is the only heart-shaped character aside from Little Miss Hug.

=== Little Miss Voyager ===
Little Miss Voyager is a mascot for LeSportsac in 2017.

== W ==
=== Little Miss Waste Less ===
Little Miss Waste Less is a special Little Miss created in a collaboration between Mr. Men and Ecover to promote environmental education. Her book was released 2 December 2022.

Little Miss Waste Less
- Author: Adam Hargreaves
- Illustrator: Adam Hargreaves
- Language: English
- Publication date: 2 December 2022
- Publication place: United Kingdom
- Pages: 34 pp

=== Little Miss Whoops ===
Little Miss Whoops
- Author: Adam Hargreaves
- Illustrator: Adam Hargreaves
- Language: English
- Series: Little Miss
- Genre: Children's literature
- Publication date: 4 September 2003
- Publication place: United Kingdom
- Pages: 34 pp
- ISBN: 978-0-7498-5899-5
- Preceded by: Little Miss Bad
- Followed by: Little Miss Princess

Little Miss Whoops is the 33rd of the Little Miss series. Little Miss Whoops goes to visit her brother, Mr. Bump. Unfortunately, disasters happen.

In the 2008 TV series The Mr. Men Show, Miss Whoops keeps her pink nose but her hair is invisible, a pair of glasses and a pink bow replace her bandages, and her colour is a lighter shade of blue; she is slightly less round. As her name suggests, her catchphrase for the show is "Whoops!". Miss Whoops also says that she doesn't like "flat food" and claims she's a "trained professional" at everything she does. While in the book, she is Mr. Bump's sister, it is never mentioned in the TV series (except on the Cartoon Network site and the Mr. Men Show magazine) although they are the same colour and equally clumsy. Apparently, Little Miss Whoops is very nearsighted when she was seen without her glasses (explained well in the episode, "Eyeglasses"); even in the book, she squints. Their relationship was hinted at by the way they interacted ("Actually it's me, Mr. Bump"; "Mr. Bump, we make quite the team"); Miss Whoops really wanted Mr. Bump to celebrate her birthday in "Parties" and the Mr. Men Annual 2010. In the US broadcast Miss Whoops has a monotone New Jersey voice like Fran Drescher and in the UK a Welsh accent. In the US and UK versions, she is voiced by Alicyn Packard and Teresa Gallagher respectively.

Little Miss Whoops has also appears under the titles Madame Malchance (French), Doña Pupas (Spanish), and Menina Disparate (Portuguese). Miss Whoops was planned to be the last Little Miss character, but it actually wasn't, and Little Miss Princess appeared.

=== Little Miss Wise ===
Little Miss Wise
- Author: Viviane Cohen and Evelyne Lallemand
- Illustrator: Colette David
- Language: English
- Publication date: 1990 (France); 1994 (UK)
- Publication place: France; United Kingdom
- Pages: 34 pp
- ISBN: 978-0-7498-5245-0
- Preceded by: Little Miss Quick
- Followed by: Little Miss Tidy

Little Miss Wise is the 24th book in the Little Miss series. Little Miss Wise is always thinking. Miss Wise is wise as an owl, or possibly two owls. Being so wise and sensible means that Little Miss Wise brushes her teeth every day, makes her bed every day, tidies her house every day, and does lots of other wise and sensible things. If you are as wise as Little Miss Wise, you will know just what kind of other things Miss Wise does; among them, Little Miss Wise goes for a walk every day.

Little Miss Wise has been published under the alternative titles of Madame Sage (French), Doña Sensata (Spanish), Η Κυρία Μυαλωμένη (Greek), Seulgi Yang (슬기양; Korean), and Zhìhuì Xiǎojiě (智慧小姐; Taiwan).

== Y ==
=== Little Miss Yes ===
Little Miss Yes is part of the Little Miss series. Unlike Mr. No, Miss Yes always agrees with everyone on everything.

Little Miss Yes has been published under the alternative titles of Madame Oui (French), Η Κύρια Ναι (Greek).

== See also ==
- List of Mr. Men
- Mr. Men
