= Little Miss meme =

Internet meme

In 2022, characters from the Mr. Men and Little Miss book and television series became a viral internet meme with users on social media platforms posting them to reveal aspects of their own personalities in a humorous way. Dubbed the "Little Miss meme", posts consist of an image of a character from the series, along with a caption listing a personality trait they have. When describing the memes, Forbes India said "these 2022 reboots are being used to highlight darker, more toxic sides of people's personalities and attitudes—although always with humor" and connected them to the trend of presenting trauma as humor. The memes have also been used to present insecurities.

According to Mashable, the meme can be traced back to 2014. However, the meme went viral when @juulpuppy, an Instagram meme generator, began posting them on April 19, 2022. The first memes posted by @juulpuppy received 52,000 likes on Instagram.
