= Michael Daedalus Kenny =

American animator and director

Michael Daedalus Kenny

Michael Daedalus Kenny, also known as Mike Kenny, is an American animator, comic book illustrator, storyboard artist and director. His storyboard and directing credits include As Told by Ginger, The Wild Thornberrys, Rugrats, Rocket Power, Camp Lazlo, Finley the Fire Engine, Nickelodeon's Tak and the Power of Juju, Little Bush, and Cartoon Network's The Mr. Men Show.

Kenny's latest project is Miles from Tomorrowland. He directed the As Told by Ginger episode "Lunatic Lake", which was nominated for a Primetime Emmy Award for Outstanding Animated Program.
