= Mr. Men =

Children's book series

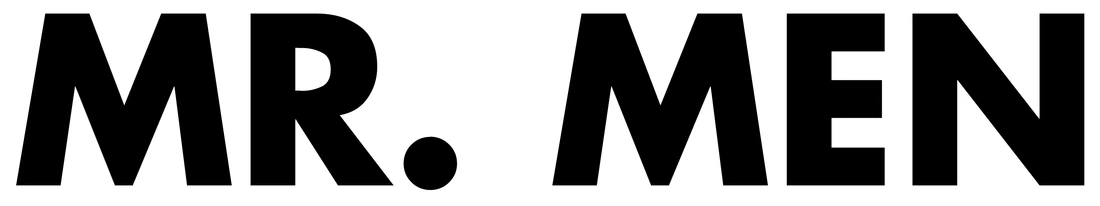
- Author: Roger Hargreaves (1971–1988); Adam Hargreaves (1988–present)
- Country: United Kingdom
- Language: English
- Genre: Children's literature
- Publisher: Fabbri Publishing (1971–1974); Thurman Publishing (1975–1980s); Chorion's THOIP (2004–2011); Sanrio (2011–present); For UK and World English: Reed Elsevier (1971–1998); Egmont World/Egmont Group (1998–2021); Farshore, HarperCollins (2021–present); For US: Price Stern Sloan (1980–1993); Putnam Publishing Group (1993–1996); Penguin Group (1996–2013); Penguin Random House (2013–present)
- Published: 10 August 1971; 55 years ago – present (Mr. Men); 1 September 1981; 45 years ago – present (Little Miss)
- No. of books: (List of books)

Mr. Men are an English series of children's books and media franchise written and illustrated by English author Roger Hargreaves which began publication in August 1971. From 1981, an accompanying series of Little Miss books by the same author (but with female characters) was published. A similar series, but with animal characters, Timbuctoo started in 1978. After Hargreaves's death in 1988, his son Adam Hargreaves began writing and illustrating new Mr. Men and Little Miss stories starting in 2003.

Each book in the original Mr. Men and Little Miss series introduced a different title character and their single dominant personality trait to convey a simple moral lesson. Mr. Men and Little Miss characters frequently reappear in other characters' books. As of 2021, a total of 92 Mr. Men and Little Miss characters had been featured in the series. The books' simple stories, with brightly coloured, boldly drawn illustrations, have sold over 250 million copies worldwide across 28 countries.

== History ==
Mr. Tickle, 1971

=== Roger Hargreaves ===
The Mr. Men series began as a side project of Roger Hargreaves' while he focused on his advertising career, creating commercials for Askit Powders entitled Askit Fights the Miseries. The titular Miseries have been seen as precursors to the Mr. Men characters. The first six Mr. Men books were published in the United Kingdom on 10 August 1971. Mr. Tickle was the first Mr. Men character created by Hargreaves, inspired by his son Adam, who had asked him what a tickle looked like. Hargreaves responded with a round, orange figure with long, bendy arms. The account of the first book's creation is disputed. According to John Malam, who wrote Roger Hargreaves' entry in the Oxford Dictionary of National Biography, the inspiration for his initial creations came while doodling at work. Malam told Amelia Tait of the New Statesman in 2021 of the anecdote about his son's query: "It became too good to dispute and no doubt helped in the early marketing campaigns."

Over the course of the 1970s, Roger Hargreaves produced 38 more Mr. Men in addition to Mr. Tickle, as well as producing a number of other Mr. Men books. In the 1980s, Roger Hargreaves began the Little Miss series with Little Miss Bossy, and he produced 21 characters and books. The Little Miss series was created to appeal to his twin daughters. As well as this, two special Mr. Men stories were created in 1984 and 1985 (Mr. Nobody and Mr. Christmas). Roger Hargreaves died in 1988 of a stroke.

=== Adam Hargreaves ===
In 2003, 15 years after his father's death, Adam Hargreaves took over as writer of the Mr. Men books, starting with three new Mr. Men characters and three new Little Miss characters; Mr. Cool, Mr. Rude, Mr. Good, Little Miss Scary, Little Miss Bad and Little Miss Whoops. Adam stated he had never drawn any of the characters before his father's death and it took three years for him to learn how to. He said continuing the series was "strangely cathartic, even though I was sitting at my dad’s desk and in his office, it gave me something to concentrate on". He also created Little Miss Christmas to accompany Mr. Christmas after the book was rereleased with new illustrations. Despite his father's passing, the books written by Adam still have "by Roger Hargreaves" on their front covers as he feels Roger's name is "synonymous" and "part of the [Mr. Men] brand".

A competition was held in the British Sunday Times newspaper for children to submit their own Mr. Men character for inclusion in a limited edition celebrating the 30th anniversary of the series. Mr. Cheeky was selected as the winning entry, submitted by then-eight-year-old Gemma Almond. Her creation led to a book featuring her character being published; it was sold only in W H Smith branches, with a portion of the proceeds going to a charity, supporting children with leukemia.

In April 2004, Hargreaves' widow Christine sold the rights to the Mr. Men and Little Miss characters to UK entertainment group Chorion for £28 million. They called their company THOIP. In 2006, to celebrate 35 years of Mr. Men and 25 years of Little Miss, Mr. Birthday and Little Miss Birthday were published. In October 2006, Adam Hargreaves created the first Little Miss character based on a real person; Stella McCartney, who he named Little Miss Stella. This was published as a limited edition of 1,000 copies for use as fashion show invitations.

In February 2011, 20th Century Fox and 21 Laps Entertainment announced plans for an animated film, which is now under development by StudioCanal and HeyDay Films.

In 2011, Sanrio, the Japanese design company best known as the creators of Hello Kitty, announced that they had reached an agreement to acquire the rights to the Mr. Men and Little Miss characters from Chorion after the company was forced into administration, so they used the THOIP company to take over. This marked the first time that Sanrio had licensed a third-party character since owning the rights to Osamu Tezuka's Unico character in the late 1970s and early 1980s, which was returned to Tezuka Productions after Tezuka's death in 1989.

In 2016, four new characters were launched to celebrate the series' 45th anniversary: Mr. Marvelous, Mr. Adventure, Little Miss Fabulous, and Little Miss Sparkle. Little Miss Explorer, a special book for Heathrow was also launched. Little Miss Valentine was introduced to the US market in 2019 with Little Miss Inventor being the latest mainline character to receive a book. Adam Hargreaves has also created several commercial characters, such as Mr. Glug for Evian water, Little Miss Miracle beauty cream, Mr. and Little Miss Gap, and Mr. First for money transfer company World First. In 2017, Adam Hargreaves launched a new series of books featuring characters from the BBC science-fiction series Doctor Who, with each book focusing on a different incarnation of the show's titular character. These were followed by editions based on the Spice Girls in 2019.

On 10 August 2021 (the 50th anniversary of Mr. Tickle), special editions were published and new characters were introduced as part of a public vote to select two who would join the main characters, Mr. Brilliant, Little Miss Kind, Little Miss Brave, Mr. Calm, and Little Miss Energy. The chosen Mr. Men for the competition were Mr. Calm and Little Miss Brave.

On 6 October 2021, it was announced that a brand new Mr. Men Little Miss television series would be produced by Endeavor Content. On 6 November 2024, it was announced that Watch Next Media would take over production of the new television series with the show being developed throughout 2025 and production aiming to start in 2026.

== Format ==
Each book contains a title page, 16 to 18 text pages, and 15 to 17 colour illustrations drawn with a Magic Marker. Instead of being in a reduced font size, the title of each book curves down at the end if the name of the titular Mr. Men character is too long to fit on the cover horizontally. The typeface for the original Little Miss books from Little Miss Bossy to Little Miss Contrary is Univers, with the books from Little Miss Busy to Little Miss Somersault using Helvetica. In the Mr. Men series, Mr. Brave to Mr. Cheerful use Helvetica. All the other books in the Mr. Men and Little Miss series use Optima. All of the Little Miss books also sometimes use Optima. The books are paperback with dimensions of 14 cm × 12.6 cm. If all the books of each series are put together in order, the words 'My Mr. Men library' or 'My Little Miss library' can be read across the spines and an illustration of Walter the Worm (Mr. Men) or a flower (Little Miss) can be seen.

=== Setting ===
The stories are set in a fictional universe called "Dillydale", a.k.a "Misterland", which is inhabited by the Mr. Men and Little Misses themselves, as well as some ordinary human characters such as shopkeepers, doctors and postmen. There are also various animals; Walter the Worm is the main animal who appears frequently.

== TV series ==
=== Original TV series (1974–1976) ===
Mr. Men
- Based on: Mr. Men by Roger Hargreaves
- Narrated by: Arthur Lowe
- No. of seasons: 2
- No. of episodes: 28

Production
- Running time: 7 mins. approx

Original release
- Network: BBC One
- Release: 31 December 1974 – 26 September 1976

The Mr. Men characters were adapted into an animated television series called The Mister Men, consisting of 28 episodes in total, with the first series beginning on 31 December 1974. They were produced by Terry Ward's company Flicks Films (formerly known as 101 Film Productions) in partnership with Trevor Bond, and it was broadcast on BBC1. Actor Arthur Lowe provided the narration and voices and used regional accents for some of the characters. The musical theme was composed by Tony Hymas.

==== Series 1: The Mister Men (1974–1975) ====
| No. overall | No. in season | Title | First broadcast |
|---|---|---|---|
| 1 | 1 | "Mr Happy" | 31 December 1974 |
| 2 | 2 | "Mr Topsy Turvy" | 7 January 1975 |
| 3 | 3 | "Mr Bump" | 14 January 1975 |
| 4 | 4 | "Mr Tickle" | 21 January 1975 |
| 5 | 5 | "Mr Silly" | 28 January 1975 |
| 6 | 6 | "Mr Sneeze" | 4 February 1975 |
| 7 | 7 | "Mr Uppity" | 11 February 1975 |
| 8 | 8 | "Mr Nosey" | 18 February 1975 |
| 9 | 9 | "Mr Snow" | 25 February 1975 |
| 10 | 10 | "Mr Daydream" | 4 March 1975 |
| 11 | 11 | "Mr Messy" | 11 March 1975 |
| 12 | 12 | "Mr Small" | 18 March 1975 |
| 13 | 13 | "Mr Greedy" | 25 March 1975 |

==== Series 2: Mister Men (1976) ====
When the second series was broadcast, the series name was shortened from The Mister Men to Mister Men, and each story was paired with a story from the first series.

| No. overall | No. in season | Title | Paired with | First broadcast |
|---|---|---|---|---|
| 14 | 1 | "Mr Mean" | Mr Tickle | 4 July 1976 |
| 15 | 2 | "Mr Bounce" | Mr Silly | 11 July 1976 |
| 16 | 3 | "Mr Chatterbox" | Mr Topsy-Turvy | 18 July 1976 |
| 17 | 4 | "Mr Jelly" | Mr Nosey | 25 July 1976 |
| 18 | 5 | "Mr Impossible" | Mr Small | 1 August 1976 |
| 19 | 6 | "Mr Muddle" | Mr Daydream | 8 August 1976 |
| 20 | 7 | "Mr Strong" | Mr Happy | 15 August 1976 |
| 21 | 8 | "Mr Forgetful" | Mr Uppity | 22 August 1976 |
| 22 | 9 | "Mr Fussy" | Mr Snow | 29 August 1976 |
| 23 | 10 | "Mr Noisy" | Mr Sneeze | 5 September 1976 |
| 24 | 11 | "Mr Funny" | Mr Messy | 12 September 1976 |
| 25 | 12 | "Mr Lazy" | Mr Bump | 19 September 1976 |
| 26 | 13 | "Mr Dizzy" | Mr Greedy | 26 September 1976 |

==== Unaired episodes ====
Two episodes produced in 1978 were not aired but were included on home media releases.

| No. overall | Title |
|---|---|
| 27 | "Mr Grumpy" |
| 28 | "Mr Worry" |

When the series was released on home media, it was released with the name Mr. Men, rather than the original broadcast name of The Mister Men. The entire series was released to VHS and DVD in October 2003 in the UK, with the episodes presented in a different order.

=== Little Miss (1983) ===
The thirteen original Little Miss characters were adapted into a BBC TV series starring Pauline Collins as the Little Misses, with John Alderton as the Narrator and the Mister Men. The series was produced and directed by Terry Ward and Trevor Bond, who also produced the 1974 series. Music was written by Dave Cooke, who also wrote the music for The Mister Men rescore. When the new episodes of Little Miss were broadcast on BBC1 beginning on 14 February 1983, they were paired with reruns of The Mister Men series. The paired episodes were billed in Radio Times as a single programme, titled Little Misses and the Mister Men. The theme music and background music of The Mister Men reruns was changed and rewritten to match the style of the Little Miss music. Whilst previously thought lost, in December 2025, Scotchka uploaded 12 of the rescored episodes to Youtube, leaving only one episode lost. Little Misses and the Mister Men aired on BBC1 from its debut until its last BBC1 airing on 15 June 1987. Less than a year later, reruns of Little Misses and the Mister Men were moved to BBC2 beginning on 27 January 1988 until the last airing on 22 December 1988. This was the first Mr. Men based series to air in the United States, getting two VHS releases from Warner Home Video with an American redub in 1986.

==== Episodes ====
| No. | Title | Paired with | First broadcast |
|---|---|---|---|
| 1 | "Little Miss Tiny" | Mr Tickle | 14 February 1983 |
| 2 | "Little Miss Shy" | Mr Silly | 21 February 1983 |
| 3 | "Little Miss Splendid" | Mr Jelly | 28 February 1983 |
| 4 | "Little Miss Magic" | Mr Daydream | 7 March 1983 |
| 5 | "Little Miss Neat" | Mr Chatterbox | 14 March 1983 |
| 6 | "Little Miss Naughty" | Mr Forgetful | 21 March 1983 |
| 7 | "Little Miss Bossy" | Mr Greedy | 18 November 1983 |
| 8 | "Little Miss Sunshine" | Mr Bump | 25 November 1983 |
| 9 | "Little Miss Plump" | Mr Happy | 2 December 1983 |
| 10 | "Little Miss Scatterbrain" | Mr Bounce | 9 December 1983 |
| 11 | "Little Miss Late" | Mr Mean | 16 December 1983 |
| 12 | "Little Miss Trouble" | Mr Impossible | 23 December 1983 |
| 13 | "Little Miss Helpful" | Mr Fussy | 30 December 1983 |

The entire series was released to VHS and DVD in October 2003 in the UK, with the episodes presented in a different order. One unusual note is that, in the episodes 'Little Miss Splendid' and 'Little Miss Bossy', audio crucial to the plot was muted.

=== Mr. Men and Little Miss (1995–1997), The Mr. Men Show (1997-1999) ===
Another series, Mr. Men and Little Miss, was produced by Marina Productions in 1995 and originally aired on British and Irish television from 1995 to 1997; these stories had in it Geoffrey Palmer, Gordon Peters as the narrator, and Jill Shilling and were aired on Nick Jr. and Channel 5's Milkshake! in the late 1990s and early 2000s. The show first aired on CITV. The series was a co-production between Marina Productions in France and Flicks Films in the UK. Terry Ward was the co-producer and director in London.

In 1998, 35 of the episodes were made into books, receiving a global release in 2014.

In 1996, the series was localised in the United States and Canada as The Mr. Men Show; this series incorporated live-action segments as well as three episodes from the original series redubbed with Canadian voice actors. This version lasted for only one season.

=== The Mr. Men Show (2008–2009) ===
By 2006, Chorion had its series of books licensed to Renegade Animation to produce The Mr. Men Show which debuted on Cartoon Network in North America and on Channel 5's Milkshake! in the UK in February 2008. There were only 25 characters featured in the first season, although most had their names or appearances altered; the second season had 31 characters. The series was written and produced by Eryk Casemiro and Kate Boutilier and directed by Mark Risley. The creative team was a combined effort of personnel from Nickelodeon's Rugrats, The Wild Thornberrys, and As Told by Ginger. All of the opening and closing parts are narrated by Joey D'Auria (credited as Joseph J. Terry) in the US and Simon Callow in the UK.

=== Mr. Men Little Miss Mini Adventures (2025–present) ===
Mr. Men Little Miss Mini Adventures is an animated children's web series based on the Mr. Men and Little Miss series of books produced by Maga Animation Studio. It premiered on the official Mr. Men Little Miss YouTube channel and Instagram page on 6 June 2025, with twelve episodes being released on a weekly basis through 27 June 2025. A second season premiered on 10 July 2026.

=== Untitled animated series ===
On 6 October 2021, Endeavor Content announced a new Mr. Men and Little Miss series. On 6 November 2024, it was announced the series was now being produced by Watch Next Media.

=== UK video and DVD releases ===
- Warner Home Video (1981)
- 20th Century Fox Home Entertainment (1988, 1995–1997)
- Abbey Home Media (1991–1994, 1998–2001, 2006, 2016–2020)
- Delta Music (2002–2015)
- Sony Pictures Home Entertainment (2008–2009)

| VHS video title | Year of release | Episodes |
|---|---|---|
| Mr. Men Volume 1 | November 1988 | "Mr. Happy", "Mr. Snow", "Mr. Jelly", "Mr. Snow", "Mr. Funny", "Mr. Bounce", "Mr. Forgetful" |
| Mr. Men Volume 2 | November 1988 | "Mr. Impossible", "Mr. Small", "Mr. Daydream", "Mr. Messy", "Mr. Bump", "Mr. Greedy", "Mr. Tickle" |
| Mr. Men Volume 3 | November 1988 | "Mr. Muddle", "Mr. Topsy-Turvy", "Mr. Mean", "Mr. Lazy", "Mr. Noisy", "Mr. Chatterbox", "Mr. Nosey" |
| Mr. Men Volume 4 | November 1988 | "Mr. Uppity", "Mr. Sneeze", "Mr. Dizzy", "Mr. Fussy", "Mr. Grumpy", "Mr. Worry", "Mr. Strong" |
| Mr. Happy and Friends | May 1995 | "Mr. Happy", "Mr. Silly", "Mr. Jelly", "Mr. Snow", "Mr. Bounce", "Mr. Forgetful", "Mr. Funny" |
| Mr. Bump and Friends | May 1995 | "Mr. Bump", "Mr. Impossible", "Mr. Daydream", "Mr. Tickle", "Mr. Small", "Mr. Messy", "Mr. Greedy" |
| Mr. Topsy-Turvy and Friends | May 1995 | "Mr. Topsy-Turvy", "Mr. Muddle", "Mr. Mean", "Mr. Noisy", "Mr. Nosey", "Mr. Lazy", "Mr. Chatterbox" |
| Mr. Strong and Friends | May 1995 | "Mr. Strong", "Mr. Sneeze", "Mr. Fussy", "Mr. Worry", "Mr. Uppity", "Mr. Dizzy", "Mr. Grumpy" |
| Mr. Greedy | August 2003 | "Mr. Greedy", "Mr. Fussy", "Mr. Grumpy", "Mr. Dizzy" |
| Mr. Tickle | August 2003 | "Mr. Tickle", "Mr. Uppity", "Mr. Snow", "Mr. Sneeze" |
| Mr. Funny | August 2003 | "Mr. Funny", "Mr. Jelly", "Mr. Bounce", "Mr. Daydream" |
| Mr. Happy | August 2003 | "Mr. Happy", "Mr. Noisy", "Mr. Messy", "Mr. Forgetful" |
| Mr. Nosey | August 2003 | "Mr. Nosey", "Mr. Small", "Mr. Lazy", "Mr. Impossible" |
| Mr. Strong | August 2003 | "Mr. Strong", "Mr. Topsy-Turvy", "Mr. Muddle", "Mr. Mean" |
| Mr. Bump | August 2003 | "Mr. Bump", "Mr. Worry", "Mr. Chatterbox", "Mr. Silly" |
| Mr. Men – Series One | August 2003 | "Mr. Happy", "Mr. Silly", "Mr. Jelly", "Mr. Snow", "Mr. Bounce", "Mr. Forgetful", "Mr. Funny", "Mr. Bump", "Mr. Tickle", "Mr. Small", "Mr. Messy", "Mr. Greedy", "Mr. Sneeze" |
| Mr. Men – Series Two | August 2003 | "Mr. Strong", "Mr. Daydream", "Mr. Fussy", "Mr. Worry", "Mr. Uppity", "Mr. Dizzy", "Mr. Topsy-Turvy", "Mr. Muddle", "Mr. Mean", "Mr. Nosey", "Mr. Chatterbox", "Mr. Noisy", "Mr. Impossible", "Mr. Lazy", "Mr. Grumpy" |
| Mr. Men – Complete Original Series | August 2003 | "Mr. Happy", "Mr. Silly", "Mr. Jelly", "Mr. Snow", "Mr. Bounce", "Mr. Forgetful", "Mr. Funny", "Mr. Bump", "Mr. Tickle", "Mr. Small", "Mr. Messy", "Mr. Greedy", "Mr. Sneeze", "Mr. Strong", "Mr. Daydream", "Mr. Fussy", "Mr. Worry", "Mr. Uppity", "Mr. Dizzy", "Mr. Topsy-Turvy", "Mr. Muddle", "Mr. Mean", "Mr. Nosey", "Mr. Chatterbox", "Mr. Noisy", "Mr. Impossible", "Mr. Lazy", "Mr. Grumpy" |
| Little Miss Splendid | August 2003 | "Little Miss Splendid", "Little Miss Late", "Little Miss Plump", "Little Miss Helpful" |
| Little Miss Tiny | August 2003 | "Little Miss Tiny", "Little Miss Bossy", "Little Miss Naughty", "Little Miss Trouble" |
| Little Miss Magic | August 2003 | "Little Miss Magic", "Little Miss Neat", "Little Miss Scatterbrain", "Little Miss Sunshine", "Little Miss Shy" |
| Little Miss – Complete Original Series | October 2003 | "Little Miss Splendid", "Little Miss Late", "Little Miss Plump", "Little Miss Helpful", "Little Miss Tiny", "Little Miss Bossy", "Little Miss Naughty", "Little Miss Trouble", "Little Miss Magic", "Little Miss Neat", "Little Miss Scatterbrain", "Little Miss Sunshine", "Little Miss Shy" |

== Film ==
In February 2011, it was reported that 20th Century Fox Animation was developing an animated feature film based on the Mr. Men book series, with Shawn Levy producing the film through his company 21 Laps Entertainment. On 27 January 2015, Fox Animation confirmed that it had acquired the film rights to the Mr. Men Little Miss characters.

In December 2025, Variety reported that a new film adaptation was in development with StudioCanal and Heyday Films.

== Reception ==
Over 250 million copies of Mr. Men and Little Miss books have been sold worldwide across 28 countries. Screen Rant called the book series "iconic".

Some have perceived the series as misogynistic, a University of Lincoln study suggested that the Little Miss characters conformed to female stereotypes. Eleanor Mills criticised the series as sexist on Good Morning Britain, she claimed that "the women in them are always having to be saved by Mr. Strong or somebody like that, and often have to do domestic tasks." She also jokingly compared the character of Mr. Tickle to Harvey Weinstein, likening his tickling of other characters to "slightly Harvey Weinstein tendencies." These comments sparked backlash on social media.

In 2022, an internet meme dubbed the "Little Miss Meme" went viral on social media. The meme consists of images of a character from the series with a caption listing a specific, often dark personality trait. These posts were used to "highlight darker, more toxic sides of people's personalities and attitudes—although always with humor".

== See also ==
- Adam Hargreaves
- Mr. Men and Little Miss (1995–1997)
- The Mr. Men Show (1997–1999)
- The Mr. Men Show (2008–2009)
- Timbuctoo
