= Gordon Peters =

British actor (1926–2022)

- Born: Gordon Peter Wilkinson; 29 November 1926; Shildon, County Durham, England
- Died: 15 June 2022 (aged 95); Surrey, England
- Occupation: Actor
- Spouses: Joan Mann (m. 1959, divorced); Patricia Fraser (m. 1969)
- Children: 1

Gordon Peter Wilkinson (29 November 1926 – 15 June 2022), known professionally as Gordon Peters, was an English actor and comedian.

== Early life ==
Peters was born in Shildon, County Durham on 29 November 1926. His mother was a piano teacher and his father a tenor-voiced butcher, both enthusiastic amateur performers. Peters spent much of his early childhood as a chorister at Durham Cathedral. Peters began his early career as a junior bank clerk after national service in the Royal Navy, at the Standard Bank of South Africa, in Harare, (Rhodesia, now Zimbabwe). It was there he entered a talent contest, his comic miming to two songs securing him second place.

== Career ==
Returning to the UK in 1951, he found his first job, a summer season with the Vincent Tildsley’s Mastersingers at Blackpool’s Opera House, after responding to an advert in The Stage.

Peters starred in a BBC TV comedy series in 1973 called The Gordon Peters Show, which was a situation comedy in which he played a character with his own name. It only lasted a single series of five episodes.

He devised and hosted a children’s quiz Around the World in 48 Hours for Westward Television in 1976.

Peters had many roles in other television shows over the years, including Oh Brother!, two episodes of Hi-de-Hi!, four episodes of Dad's Army, two episodes of Are You Being Served?, one episode of Grace & Favour (also called Are You Being Served? Again! in the United States). He played Victor and Margaret Meldrew's family friend Ronnie in three episodes of the long-running BBC sitcom One Foot in the Grave during the 1990s, five episodes of Never the Twain. Moreover, he featured in one episode of Little Britain in 2005, as a booking clerk in an episode of the BBC sitcom Keeping Up Appearances and in one episode of HBO's Tales from the Crypt. He voiced the narrator, male characters and all the Mr. Men in the 1995–1997 series Mr. Men and Little Miss save for the 1998 special The Christmas Letter, where the roles of the narrator and Santa Claus were taken up by Geoffrey Palmer.

== Personal life and death ==
Peters married Joan Mann in 1959, however the marriage ended in divorce. In 1969 he married Patrica Fraser and they had one daughter together.

He published an autobiography, From Choirboy to Comic, in 2004.

Peters died on 15 June 2022, aged 95.
