= Mr. Tickle =

1971 children's book by Roger Hargreaves

- Cover of Mr. Tickle
- Author: Roger Hargreaves
- Illustrator: Roger Hargreaves
- Language: English
- Series: Mr. Men
- Genre: Children's literature
- Publisher: Egmont Publishing; Fabbri
- Publication date: August 10, 1971
- Publication place: United Kingdom
- Pages: 40 pp
- ISBN: 978-0-85396-003-4
- Preceded by: N/A
- Followed by: Mr. Greedy

Mr. Tickle is the first book in the Mr. Men series by Roger Hargreaves which was published on August 10, 1971. The titular character is an orange Mr. Man who has long, bendy arms and a small, blue hat.

The character was originally based on a question by Roger's son Adam Hargreaves, who asked him what a tickle would look like; the claim of which is currently being disputed.

== Plot ==
Mr. Tickle's story begins while he is in bed, getting himself a biscuit without getting up, because of his "extraordinary long arms". He then decides that it is a tickling sort of day, thus he journeys into town to tickle people: a teacher, a policeman, a greengrocer, a station guard, a doctor, a butcher, and a postman. The book ends with Mr. Tickle thinking about all the people he tickled that day and the author warning the reader that Mr. Tickle could be seen at the reader's door, wanting to tickle them.

It is an odd Mr. Men book as the protagonist is amoral, tickling everyone, yet there is no corrective action taken to mend his ways. Because of this, Mr. Tickle is left free to tickle the next day, learning nothing from his behaviour.

== Translations ==
Mr. Tickle appears under the titles:

Translation	Language
Monsieur Chatouille	French
Ο Κύριος Γαργαλίτσας	Greek
Meneertje Kietel	Dutch
コチョコチョくん (Kocho-kocho-kun)	Japanese
מר דגדוג	Hebrew
搔癢先生	Mandarin
挠痒痒先生	Mandarin (Simplified Chinese)
Unser Herr Killekille	German
Fætter Kilderik	Danish
Don Cosquillas	Spanish
Mr. Goglais	Welsh
Mister Solletico	Italian
간지럼씨	Korean
Senhor Cócegas	Portuguese
Gubben Killekill	Swedish
Pan Łaskotkiewicz	Polish
Mr. Csiki	Hungarian

== The Mr. Men Show ==
In the 2008 TV series The Mr. Men Show, Mr. Tickle remains relatively the same in looks, though his hat is aqua with a stripe on it and his arms have a normal size, but can stretch out when needed. However, he tickles other Mr. Men and Little Misses due to the absence of the humans of Dillydale. He is still determined to tickle everyone he interacts with as far as some character traits go, but, instead of doing it for mischief, he does it to make people happy, and will stop when nobody wants him to tickle them—save for when the opportunity knocks with Mr. Grumpy, who is his favourite target. He speaks with a Canadian accent in the US dub and a Welsh accent in the UK Dub. He has a catchphrase: "I think somebody needs a tickle!" In both of the US and UK dubs, he is voiced by Jeff Stewart and Rob Rackstraw, respectively.

== Criticism ==
The Mr. Tickle character has been invoked in discussions over whether tickling children may violate their bodily integrity. Critiquing the unequally applied justice in the realm of Mr. Men, Charlie Brooker decries the fact that Mr. Tickle goes unpunished despite being a "1970s children's entertainer with wandering hands who runs around town touching strangers inappropriately from dawn till dusk". Journalist Eleanor Mills compared Mr. Tickle to sex offender Harvey Weinstein in a discussion of misogyny in the Mr. Men books.

== See also ==
- List of Mr. Men
- Mr. Men
- The Mr. Men Show
- Tickle torture
