= Timbuctoo =

Book series by Roger Hargreaves

- Original 1978 edition of Oink. Other characters and books in the series had a similar appearance
- Author: Roger Hargreaves
- Country: United Kingdom
- Language: English
- Genre: Humorous talking animal
- Published: 1978–1979
- No. of books: 25

Timbuctoo is a series of 25 children's books, written and illustrated by Roger Hargreaves, better known for his Mr. Men and Little Miss series. It was published from 1978 to 1979, with selected reprints in 1993 and 1999. The books tell the stories of a group of animals, each of whom is named after the sound that their particular animal makes. An animated series (produced by Flicks Films and Carlton International) of Timbuctoo was shown on CITV which ran from 9 January 1998 to 16 April 1999, narrated by Ronnie Corbett.

== Books ==
The original set of 25 books named after their main character were published in 1978 and 1979, along with board books, shaped story books and three Timbuctoo Annuals. In 1999 eight of the books were reprinted with new illustrations to promote the television show, along with a new character, Bray.

The first twelve books were also published in Dutch, and the eight 1999 versions published in Greek.

=== 1978 ===
- Woof (an ochre dog, brown in the TV series)
- Meow (an orange cat)
- Oink (a pink pig)
- Chirp (a blue bird)
- Trumpet (a grey elephant)
- Squeak (an ochre mouse)
- Moo (a brown cow, white with brown spots in the TV series)
- Buzz (a black and yellow bee, brown and yellow in the TV series)
- Neigh (a red horse)
- Roar (an amber lion)
- Snap (a green crocodile)
- Hiss (a yellow-green snake, has purple spots in the TV series)

Four of the books (Woof, Trumpet, Buzz and Oink) were republished in 1993.

=== 1979 ===
- Croak (a green frog)
- Cluck (an orange hen)
- Growl (a yellow tiger with black stripes)
- Honk (a black seal, purple in the TV series)
- Chatter (an orange monkey)
- Quack (a white duck)
- Sniff (a grey rabbit, light blue in the TV series)
- Bleat (an orange goat)
- Hoot (a brown owl)
- Grizzle (a burgundy bear)
- Puff (a black and white panda)
- Squawk (a blue parrot)
- Baa (a grey and white sheep)

There was also a set of Timbuctoo Shape Books released, including Oink, Neigh, Growl, Roar, Squeak, Trumpet, Cluck and Puff.

=== 1997 ===
- Bray (a grey donkey)

Bray was an additional character created and written by Roger's son Adam. This was because standard TV series are often produced in 13 or 26 episode series and an additional character was required to reach 26 episodes. Eight of the original books were reprinted in 1999, with new illustrations, to accompany the TV series. While Bray was listed on the back cover along with the rest of the cast, only Buzz, Cluck, Growl, Meow, Neigh, Oink, Snap and Trumpet were reprinted.

== Television adaptation ==
Timbuctoo
- Genre: Children's Television Series
- Created by: Roger Hargreaves
- Voices of: Ronnie Corbett
- Theme music composer: Francis Haines; Mark London
- Country of origin: United Kingdom
- Original language: English
- No. of series: 2
- No. of episodes: 26

Production
- Running time: 5 minutes

Original release
- Network: ITV (CITV)
- Release: 9 January 1998 – 16 April 1999

The Timbuctoo animated television show was broadcast from January 1998 to April 1999. It ran on CITV for two series.

Series 1 was released on VHS as Neigh Finds a New Home and Other Stories in March 1999 and Series 2 released as Woof Has Forgotten How to Bark and Other Stories in February 2000. A total of 26 episodes were produced.

=== Series overview ===
- Series 1: 9 January 1998 to 3 April 1998 (13 episodes)
- Series 2: 8 January 1999 to 16 April 1999 (13 episodes)

=== Series 1 (1998) ===
1. "Neigh Finds a New Home" (9 January 1998)
2. "Honk Goes Swimming" (16 January 1998)
3. "Snap Learns a New Game" (23 January 1998)
4. "Cluck Gets a Letter" (30 January 1998)
5. "Moo Has a Birthday Party" (6 February 1998)
6. "Chirp Learns to Fly" (13 February 1998)
7. "Croak Learns to Swim" (20 February 1998)
8. "Oink and the Big Apple" (27 February 1998)
9. "Squeak has a Big Day Out" (6 March 1998)
10. "Bleat Takes the Ball By the Horns" (13 March 1998)
11. "Grizzle Gets the Giggles" (20 March 1998)
12. "Hoot Slips up at Question Time" (27 March 1998)
13. "Meow Goes Fishing" (3 April 1998)

=== Series 2 (1999) ===
1. "Woof Has Forgotten How to Bark" (8 January 1999)
2. "Hiss is Hopping Mad" (15 January 1999)
3. "Chatter and His Long Tail" (22 January 1999)
4. "Puff Buys Some Paint" (29 January 1999)
5. "Roar Sets Out to Frighten Timbuctoo" (5 February 1999)
6. "Trumpet Goes to the Seaside" (12 February 1999)
7. "Quack Dreams of a New Beak" (26 February 1999)
8. "Buzz is a Very Busy Bee" (5 March 1999)
9. "Growl Has a Fright" (12 March 1999)
10. "Baa Goes Shopping" (19 March 1999)
11. "Sniff Runs Out of Carrots" (26 March 1999)
12. "Bray Sleeps Through Christmas" (9 April 1999)
13. "Squawk Joins the Choir" (16 April 1999)
