= Roger Hargreaves =

English author and illustrator (1935–1988)

- Hargreaves in 1980
- Born: 9 May 1935; Cleckheaton, West Yorkshire, England
- Died: 11 September 1988 (aged 53); Tunbridge Wells, Kent, England
- Occupations: Writer, illustrator
- Spouse: Christine Hargreaves
- Children: 4, including Adam Hargreaves
- Writing career
- Period: 1971–1988
- Genre: Fantasy
- Subject: Children's literature
- Notable works: Mr. Men and Little Miss; Timbuctoo
- Website: mrmen.com

Charles Roger Hargreaves (9 May 1935 – 11 September 1988) was an English cartoonist, illustrator and writer of children's books. He created the Mr. Men, Little Miss and Timbuctoo series, intended for young readers. The simple and humorous stories, with bold, brightly coloured illustrations, have sold more than 85 million copies worldwide in 20 languages.

== Early life ==
Charles Roger Hargreaves was born in a private hospital at 1 Bath Road, Cleckheaton, West Yorkshire, England, on 9 May 1935 to Alfred Reginald Hargreaves and Ethel Mary Hargreaves. He grew up at 703 Halifax Road, Hartshead Moor, Cleckheaton, outside of which there now is a commemorative plaque.

Hargreaves attended Sowerby Bridge Grammar School (now Trinity Academy Sowerby Bridge). He then spent a year working in his father's laundry and dry-cleaning business before gaining employment in advertising. By 1968, he was creative director of the Foote, Cone & Belding agency where he wrote slogans such as "Emigrate to Canada Dry (for the sake of your Scotch)". Originally wanting to become a cartoonist, in 1971, he created a successful series of characters used to promote Askit Powders on television entitled The Miseries (these were used from 1971 to 1994).

== Career ==
Also, in 1971 while working as the creative director at a London firm, Hargreaves wrote the first Mr. Men book, Mr. Tickle. Initially, he had difficulty finding a publisher, but once he did, the books became an instant success, selling more than one million copies within three years. In 1974, the books spawned a BBC animated television series narrated by Arthur Lowe. A second series the following year saw newer titles transmitted in double bill format with those from the first series.

By 1976, Hargreaves had quit his day job. In 1981, the Little Miss series of books was launched and in 1983, it also was made into a television series narrated by Pauline Collins and her husband, John Alderton. Although Hargreaves wrote many other children's stories—including the Timbuctoo series of 25 books, John Mouse and the Roundy and Squary books—he is best known for his 46 Mr. Men and 33 Little Miss books.

== Personal life ==
Hargreaves and his wife had four children: Adam, Giles and twins Sophie and Amelia. Between 1975 and 1982, Hargreaves lived with his family on Guernsey. Then, they settled at Sussex House Farm near Cowden, Kent. Hargreaves died on 11 September 1988 at the age of 53 and at the Kent and Sussex Hospital in Royal Tunbridge Wells following a stroke. He was buried in Cowden, East Sussex. He had bought the adjacent field to the graveyard at Cowden Church so that he could be buried there.

After his death, his son, Adam, continued writing and drawing the Mr. Men and Little Miss characters with new stories (while signing the covers in his father's signature). In April 2004, Hargreaves' widow Christine sold the rights to the Mr. Men characters to the UK entertainment group Chorion, for £28 million. In December 2011, Chorion sold the Mr. Men brand and its associated merchandise business to Japan's Sanrio.

On 4 March 2021, Hargreaves was posthumously awarded a gold Blue Peter badge.

== Series by Roger Hargreaves ==
- Mr. Men
- Little Miss
- Walter Worm
- Once Upon a Worm
- John Mouse
- Things
- Albert Elephant, Count Worm and Grandfather Clock
- I am...
- Timbuctoo
- Hippo Potto and Mouse
- Easy Peasy People (also by Gray Jolliffe)
- Roundy and Squarey

== Appearances in other books ==
Some Mr. Men books have Hargreaves drawn in them. He appears in:

- Mr. Small
- Little Miss Star

== Legacy ==
Google celebrated what would have been his 76th birthday, 9 May 2011, with a series of 16 Google Doodles on its global homepage.

== See also ==
- Mr. Men, one of the creations by Roger Hargreaves
- Adam Hargreaves, Roger Hargreaves' son
- Timbuctoo, one of the creations by Roger Hargreaves
