= Adam Hargreaves =

English author and illustrator (born 1963)

- Born: 18 June 1963 (age 63); Surrey, England
- Occupations: Author, illustrator
- Parent: Roger Hargreaves (father)
- Writing career
- Years active: 1988–present

Adam Hargreaves (born 18 June 1963) is an English author and illustrator. The son of the late Roger Hargreaves, he continues his father's successful Mr. Men series of children's books.

== Biography ==
The younger Hargreaves reputedly served as inspiration his father's series. At the age of 8, he asked his father "What does a tickle look like?", and Roger was inspired by that question to create the first book, Mr. Tickle, published in August 1971.

Hargreaves took over the Mr. Men and Little Miss cartoon empire after his father's death in 1988, despite initially thinking the series "embarrassing" and "a bit clichéd" and contemplating a life as a farmer. At the time he had worked on an arable and beef farm in Sussex and, after taking a course at Plumpton Agricultural College in 1984, as a dairyman. He then visited Australia for four months, where he met the woman he married in 1987. When his father died following a series of strokes in 1988, Hargreaves took up the self-run business as his brother Giles pursued a career in advertising and his twin sisters Sophie and Amelia were yet too young. Attempting to assume his father's art style took "years of trial and error", even after completing a foundation course at Brighton Art College. He said that as he taught himself to draw like his father he started to have respect for what the latter had done. He understood his father's sense of humour and that what made the books and the characters so successful is that they are about universal human emotions and the books have a strong sense of morality.

In 2004, the family sold the rights to the Mr. Men franchise to entertainment group Chorion for £28 million, but Hargreaves remains the public face of the franchise and continues to invent new characters. Stella McCartney commissioned him to create Little Miss Stella for the invitations to her 2006 fashion show. For the series' 40-year anniversary in 2011 he released Little Miss Princess just in time for the royal wedding.

Although best known for continuing the Mr. Men series, Hargreaves has a lifelong passion for painting. In 2017, he created a character called Mr. Isle of Man for the island's annual literature festival. His works can be found in several art galleries.

== See also ==
- Roger Hargreaves
- Mr. Men
