= List of Mr. Men =

In 2010 a box set of 50 books was released; this photo is from the 2014 version

The following is a list of Mr. Men, from the children's book series by Roger Hargreaves. Books one (Mr. Tickle) to thirty-nine (Mr. Slow) were written and illustrated by Roger Hargreaves, while books forty (Mr. Brave) to forty-three (Mr. Cheerful) were ghostwritten by Viviane Cohen and Evelyne Lallemand, and illustrated by Colette David under Roger Hargreaves' name. The remainder were written and illustrated by Roger Hargreaves' son, Adam Hargreaves.

== A ==
=== Mr. Adventure ===
Mr. Adventure
- Author: Adam Hargreaves
- Illustrator: Adam Hargreaves
- Language: English
- Series: Mr. Men
- Genre: Children's literature
- Publication date: 4 October 2016
- Publication place: United Kingdom
- Preceded by: Mr. Marvellous
- Followed by: Mr. Calm

Mr. Adventure is the 49th book in the Mr. Men series and the sixth one created by Adam Hargreaves, son of Roger Hargreaves. Mr. Adventure is a yellow, medium-sized, bean-shaped Mr. Man with a yellow nose, red shoes, and a blue cap, along with a green backpack.

Mr. Adventure appears under the titles Monsieur Aventure (French), Don Aventura (Spanish), Unser Herr Abenteuer (German), Meneertje Avontuur (Dutch), Il Signor Impresa (Italian), and Senhor Aventura (Portuguese).

=== Mr. All-goes-Wrong ===
Mr. All-goes-Wrong is a Mr. Man who appears in Little Miss All-is-Well's book. He is similar to Little Miss All-goes-Well. His French name is Monsieur Tout-Va-Mal.

== B ==
=== Mr. Beefeater ===
Mr. Beefeater was a Mr. Man tie-in created by Hargreaves for Beefeater restaurants in the UK, and used in various child-focused activities, such as activity packs in-restaurant. He was red, being dressed as a traditional beefeater, and appeared in the 1980s and 1990s.

=== Mr. Birthday ===
Mr. Birthday is part of the Mr. Men series of books, by Roger Hargreaves. Mr. Birthday is a Mr. Man who just loves birthdays, and is also the best at organising birthdays, such as a party with silly hats for Mr. Silly, and one without balloons for Mr. Jelly, in case they burst. He once organised Mr. Happy's birthday, which he celebrated. Mr. Happy tells him not to forget about a party he knew nothing about: his own birthday. Mr. Worry and Mr. Forgetful spread rumours about this, but can Mr. Birthday celebrate this birthday? Mr. Birthday was published under the title of Monsieur Anniversaire in French.

=== Mr. Bolt ===
Mr. Bolt is a yellow Mr. Man that is based on Usain Bolt. He joined the series in 2021 but it is unknown who's faster between him and Mr. Rush.

=== Mr. Bounce ===
Mr. Bounce
- Author: Roger Hargreaves
- Illustrator: Roger Hargreaves
- Language: English
- Series: Mr. Men
- Genre: Children's literature
- Publication date: 14 April 1976
- Publication place: United Kingdom
- Preceded by: Mr. Fussy
- Followed by: Mr. Muddle

Mr. Bounce is the 22nd book in the Mr. Men series. Mr. Bounce is a yellow and round Mr. Man who wears a pink hat. Mr. Bounce bounces around like a rubber ball, making life very difficult for him. One day, after first bouncing into the duckpond at a farm and then banging his head on the ceiling from bouncing off a chair, Mr. Bounce has decided he's had it with all this bouncing about and decides to see the doctor about it. On the way, however, he trips on a pebble and becomes a tennis ball for a pair of tennis players, but after taking a bus to the doctor's, Mr. Bounce bounces into the doctor's office and into Dr. Makeyouwell's mid-morning coffee. After Mr. Bounce explains his problem, Dr. Makeyouwell gives him heavy red boots, which he wears to bed that night. The next morning, he falls through the floor straight into the kitchen.

In the 2008 TV series The Mr. Men Show, he looks the same as in the books except his hat has a stripe on it, but unlike the books, he actually likes bouncing about (his favourite bit) to the point where it causes chaos for the other Mr. Men and Little Misses of Dillydale, especially when out in public. Mr. Bounce speaks with an Indian accent in the US version and an Irish accent in the UK version. His catchphrase is "Hello! Goodbye!" (not to be confused with the Beatles' song of the same name, which has a comma and no exclamation marks). He often speaks quickly. In the US and UK versions, he is voiced by Sam Gold and Simon Greenall, respectively.

Mr. Bounce appears under the titles Monsieur Bing (French), Don Saltarin (Spanish), Meneertje Buitel/Meneertje Stuiter/Meneertje Stuiterbal (Dutch), Ο Κύριος Χοροπηδούλης (Greek), 蹦跳先生 (Taiwan), Unser Herr Hupf (German), Senhor Saltitão (Portuguese), and Mr. Pramsach (Irish).

=== Mr. Brave ===
Mr. Brave
- Author: Viviane Cohen and Evelyne Lallemand
- Illustrator: Colette David
- Language: English
- Series: Mr. Men
- Genre: Children's literature
- Publication date: 1990 (France); 1994 (UK)
- Publication place: France; United Kingdom
- Preceded by: Mr. Slow
- Followed by: Mr. Grumble

Mr. Brave is the 40th book in the Mr. Men series. Mr. Brave is the most courageous person in the world, or so everyone thinks. The truth is that Mr. Brave is really a lucky coward; however, he has two fears: heights and Little Miss Bossy. Mr. Brave has an oval-shaped yellow body, visible yellow arms and legs, and a yellow nose. Mr. Brave is a yellow Mr. Man who wears round glasses and a red and blue, striped baseball cap. Mr. Brave appears under the titles Monsieur Courageux (French), Don Valiente (Spanish), Ο Κύριος Γενναίος (Greek), 勇敢先生 (Taiwan), 용감씨 (Korean).

=== Mr. Brilliant ===
Mr. Brilliant is a Mr. Man who was part of the show 50 Years of Mr. Men, however in a competition. He has some big ideas but wasn't picked.

=== Mr. Bump ===
Mr. Bump
- Author: Roger Hargreaves
- Illustrator: Roger Hargreaves
- Language: English
- Series: Mr. Men
- Genre: Children's literature
- Publisher: Fabbri
- Publication date: 10 August 1971
- Publication place: United Kingdom
- Pages: 40 pp
- ISBN: 978-0-85396-005-8
- Preceded by: Mr. Sneeze
- Followed by: Mr. Snow

Mr. Bump is the 6th book in the Mr. Men series. Mr. Bump is a blue Mr. Man who just can't help having accidents. He has a hard time doing any job because he keeps falling, getting stuck, breaking things or hurting himself accidentally. When on holiday, he falls into a deep hole on a beach, goes boating, and falls into the water, but in the end, he does find the perfect job: walking around and bumping into trees in Mr. Barley's apple orchard, making the apples fall off the trees.

In the book Mr. Bump Loses His Memory, he falls out of his bedroom window and bumps his head, promptly causing him to get amnesia. He is told by Mr. Muddle that his name is, in fact, Mr. Careful, thus encouraging our confused Mr. Bump to try several jobs for which great care is needed, such as carrying eggs and delivering milk in glass bottles. His memory is restored when he walks into a tree, causing him to fall into a river.

In the 2008 TV series The Mr. Men Show, Mr. Bump is the show's de facto mascot, his looks are largely the same except that one of his bandages is gone, his color is now a dark shade of blue, and is always having accidents more often than not non-bump-related ones (such as accidentally being cleaned in a car wash). Like Mr. Grumpy and Mr. Small, his favourite food is liverwurst sandwiches, as mentioned in the Beach episode. He lives in an olive, square-shaped house with a black chimney, arched windows, and a bandaged roof. Little Miss Whoops (his next-door neighbour/sister), Mr. Tickle, or Little Miss Helpful are often the causes of his accidents. His catchphrases are "Poopity-poop", usually exclaimed when his situation turns bad, and "You'll never learn" to himself. In the US and UK versions, he is voiced by Paul Greenberg (credited as Aaron Albertus) and Simon Greenall, respectively.

Mr. Bump appears under the titles Monsieur Malchance (French), Don Pupas (Spanish), Meneertje Pech/Meneertje Bots (Dutch), Ο Κύριος Σκουντούφλης (Greek), 意外先生 (Taiwan), 꽈당씨 (Korean), Mr. Hergwd (Welsh), Unser Herr Schussel (German), Fætter Bumle (Danish), מר בום (Mar Boom, translated as Mr. Boom; Hebrew), Herra Skellur (Icelandic), and Senhor Trambolhão (Portuguese).

=== Mr. Busy ===
Mr. Busy
- Author: Roger Hargreaves
- Illustrator: Roger Hargreaves
- Language: English
- Series: Mr. Men
- Genre: Children's literature
- Publication date: 18 March 1978
- Publication place: United Kingdom
- Preceded by: Mr. Clever
- Followed by: Mr. Slow

Mr. Busy is the 38th book in the Mr. Men series. Mr. Busy is a Mr. Man who cannot stop rushing around and never sits still. Mr. Busy does everything ten times faster than anyone else could, much to the annoyance of his neighbour, Mr. Slow, who hates to be rushed and fussed.

Mr. Busy appears under the titles Monsieur Rapide (French), Don Ocupado (Spanish), Meneertje Druk (Dutch), 빨라씨 (Korean), 勤勞先生 (Taiwan), Ο Κύριος Πολυάσχολος (Greek), Unser Herr Schnell (German), Bay Hızlı (Turkish).

== C ==
=== Mr. Calm ===
Mr. Calm
- Author: Adam Hargreaves
- Illustrator: Adam Hargreaves
- Language: English
- Series: Mr. Men
- Genre: Children's literature
- Publication date: 3 September 2021
- Publication place: United Kingdom
- Preceded by: Mr. Adventure
- Followed by: Mr. Fib

Mr. Calm is the 50th book in the Mr. Men series. He is one of two characters voted to become an official character by the public.

Mr. Calm is quite possibly the calmest person in the world. He appreciates the simple pleasures in life and nothing can upset or disturb him, which makes him a calm head in a crisis. Unfortunately, however, his friends do not all approach life in the same way. Can Mr. Calm change their ways?

He enjoys yoga, rock climbing, and parkour. Mr. Calm is light blue, with glasses and blue hair and he wears blue sandals. Mr. Calm appears under the title "Monsieur Tranquille" in French.

=== Mr. Chatterbox ===
Mr. Chatterbox
- Author: Roger Hargreaves
- Illustrator: Roger Hargreaves
- Language: English
- Series: Mr. Men
- Genre: Children's literature
- Publication date: 19 January 1976
- Publication place: United Kingdom
- Preceded by: Mr. Mean
- Followed by: Mr. Fussy

Mr. Chatterbox is the 20th book in the Mr. Men series. Mr. Chatterbox will talk on and on. His talking causes the mailman to be late delivering all his mail and Mr. Bowler the hatter to come home late with a cold dinner. Mr. Bowler sells Mr. Chatterbox a magic hat that will grow if Mr. Chatterbox talks too much. It grows until the bottom reaches Mr. Chatterbox's feet. Nowadays, Mr. Chatterbox talks less.

Mr. Chatterbox appears under the titles Monsieur Bavard (French), Don Charlatán (Spanish), Meneertje Kwebbeldoos/Meneertje Kletskous (Dutch), 수다씨 (Korean), 多嘴先生 (Taiwan), Ο Κύριος Πολυλογάς (Greek), Unser Herr Quassel (German), and Senhor Tagarel (Portuguese).

=== Mr. Cheeky ===
Mr. Cheeky
- Author: Adam Hargreaves
- Illustrator: Adam Hargreaves
- Language: English
- Series: Mr. Men
- Genre: Children's literature
- Publication date: 21 January 2001
- Publication place: United Kingdom

Mr. Cheeky is part of the Mr. Men series of books, by Roger Hargreaves. In 2001, a competition was held in the Sunday Times for children to submit their own Mr. Men character, which was to be published in a limited edition to celebrate the 30th anniversary of the series. Mr. Cheeky by 8-year-old Gemma Almond was the winner, and her creation was then published and sold only in branches of W H Smith, with a portion of the proceeds going to a charity for children's leukaemia. Mr. Cheeky has a sassy attitude and is also mischievous.

=== Mr. Cheerful ===
Mr. Cheerful
- Author: Viviane Cohen and Evelyne Lallemand
- Illustrator: Colette David
- Language: English
- Series: Mr. Men
- Genre: Children's literature
- Publication date: 9 May 1990 (France); 1994 (UK)
- Publication place: France; United Kingdom
- Preceded by: Mr. Perfect
- Followed by: Mr. Cool

Mr. Cheerful is the 43rd book in the Mr. Men series and the final one by Roger Hargreaves. Mr. Cheerful is the second happiest man in the world, next to Mr. Happy. Mr. Cheerful appears under the titles Monsieur Joyeux (French), Don Alegre (Spanish), Meneertje Blij (Dutch), Ο Κύριος Κεφάτος (Greek), 開心先生 (Taiwan).

=== Mr. Christmas ===
Mr. Christmas is part of the Mr. Men series of books, by Roger Hargreaves. Mr. Christmas just loves Christmas. Christmas is his favourite holiday and he thinks his uncle, Father Christmas, is just so amazing! Mr. Christmas appears under the titles Monsieur Noel (French), Don Navidad (Spanish), Ο Κύριος Χριστουγεννούλης (Greek), Senhor Natal (Portuguese), and Il Signor Natale (Italian).

=== Mr. Clever ===
Mr. Clever
- Author: Roger Hargreaves
- Illustrator: Roger Hargreaves
- Language: English
- Series: Mr. Men
- Genre: Children's literature
- Publication date: 18 March 1978
- Publication place: United Kingdom
- Preceded by: Mr. Mischief
- Followed by: Mr. Busy

Mr. Clever is the 37th book in the Mr. Men series by Roger Hargreaves and the only Mr. Man who has visible ears. Mr. Clever lives in Cleverland and is one of the smartest people in the world.

Mr. Clever appears under the titles Monsieur Malin (French), Don Inteligente (Spanish), Ο Κύριος Έξυπνος (Greek), 聰明先生 (Taiwan), 영리씨 (Korean), Unser Herr Schlaumeier (German), Bay Akıllı (Turkish).

=== Mr. Clumsy ===
Mr. Clumsy
- Author: Roger Hargreaves
- Illustrator: Roger Hargreaves
- Language: English
- Series: Mr. Men
- Genre: Children's literature
- Publisher: Egmont Books
- Publication date: 5 March 1978
- Publication place: United Kingdom
- ISBN: 978-0-7214-2227-5
- Preceded by: Mr. Grumpy
- Followed by: Mr. Quiet

Mr. Clumsy is the 28th book in the Mr. Men series by Roger Hargreaves.

Mr. Clumsy always breaks things or knocks things over. When he has to go shopping, instead of taking just one can, he knocks over the whole stack. On a farm, he falls into the duck pond, dragging the unfortunate farmer in with him, and must go home and take a bath. He falls into the linen basket. He falls out of his chair when he eats dinner. Then he has an accident before he goes to bed. Mr. Clumsy is green with a yellow nose and he has one pair of red shoes. Mr. Clumsy was first introduced in Mr. Fussy as Mr. Fussy's cousin, before appearing as the title character in his own book.

Mr. Clumsy appears under the titles Monsieur Maladroit (French), Don Desastre (Spanish), Meneertje Onhandig (Dutch), 서툴러씨 (Korean), 呆呆先生 (Taiwan), Ο Κύριος Αδέξιος (Greek), Unser Herr Tolpatsch (German), Fætter Bulder (Danish).

=== Mr. Cool ===
Mr. Cool
- Author: Adam Hargreaves
- Illustrator: Adam Hargreaves
- Language: English
- Series: Mr. Men
- Genre: Children's literature
- Publication date: 3 April 2003
- Publication place: United Kingdom
- Pages: 38 pp
- ISBN: 978-0-7498-5850-6
- Preceded by: Mr. Cheerful
- Followed by: Mr. Rude

Mr. Cool is the 44th book in the Mr. Men series by Roger Hargreaves and the first one created by Adam Hargreaves. Mr. Cool is the coolest person in the world. When Jack Robinson has chicken pox and is bored in bed, Mr. Cool appears, snapping his fingers. Everything happens to make Jack happy and have fun. At the end of the book, Jack's chicken pox is gone during an extremely long slide down Mount Everest. Mr. Cool is published under the title Monsieur Génial in France, Don Guay in Spanish, O Κύριος Καταπληκτικός in Greek, and 酷帥先生 in Mandarin.

=== Mr. Crosspatch ===
Mr. Crosspatch is part of the Mr. Men series of books, by Roger Hargreaves. He is eager to fight over the slightest provocation, often by ramming his head into things. As a result, Mr. Crosspatch has a plaster (bandage) on his forehead. Mr. Crosspatch appears under the titles Monsieur Bagarreur (French), O Κύριος Καβγατζής (Greek).

== D ==
=== Mr. Daydream ===
Mr. Daydream
- Author: Roger Hargreaves
- Illustrator: Roger Hargreaves
- Language: English
- Series: Mr. Men
- Genre: Children's literature
- Publisher: Fabbri
- Publication date: 15 August 1972
- Publication place: United Kingdom
- Pages: 40 pp
- ISBN: 978-0-85396-022-5
- Preceded by: Mr. Small
- Followed by: Mr. Forgetful

Mr. Daydream is the 13th book in the Mr. Men series by Roger Hargreaves.

The story tells of a little boy named Jack. Jack is a nice boy, and he likes to daydream a lot. He is at school when his teacher is talking about history. He looks out the window and meets Mr. Daydream, who invites Jack to come on an adventure with him. They get on the back of a huge bird, and the bird flies them from place to place. In the jungle, a crocodile tricks them into using his back as a bridge and tries to toss them into his mouth, reminiscent of what the fox did to The Gingerbread Man. The bird rescues them and takes Jack and Mr. Daydream to other places, such as the North Pole, and finally to the Wild West, where Mr. Daydream puts on a hat too big for him, and cannot see. He calls Jack's name from under the hat, and Jack realises that it wasn't Mr. Daydream calling Jack's name, but his teacher. When the teacher says Jack has been daydreaming, the reader realises that daydreaming is more fun than history!

Mr. Daydream appears under the titles Monsieur Rêve (French), Don Soñador (Spanish), Meneertje Dagdroom (Dutch), 白日夢先生 (Taiwan), 공상씨 (Korean), Mr. Breuddwyd (Welsh), Ο Κύριος Ονειροπόλος (Greek), Unser Herr Träumerisch (German), Fætter Dagdrøm (Danish), Gubben Dagdröm (Swedish).

=== Mr. Dizzy ===
Mr. Dizzy
- Author: Roger Hargreaves
- Illustrator: Roger Hargreaves
- Language: English
- Series: Mr. Men
- Genre: Children's literature
- Publisher: Egmont Books
- Publication date: 14 April 1976
- Publication place: United Kingdom
- ISBN: 978-0-7214-2244-2
- Preceded by: Mr. Muddle
- Followed by: Mr. Impossible

Mr. Dizzy is the 24th book in the Mr. Men series by Roger Hargreaves.

Mr. Dizzy lives in Cleverland, where everybody is clever except for him – until, one day, because a pig and an elephant take advantage of him, he wishes himself clever as he drinks from a wishing well, despite being unaware of its magical properties. He returns and asks the pig, "What's fat and pink and goes Atishoo, Atishoo?" (This is replaced with "Achoo! Achoo!" in the US edition.) The pig is flummoxed until Mr. Dizzy tickles the pig's nose, causing him to sneeze and say, "Atishoo! Atishoo!" Next, he asks the elephant, "What's large and grey and goes Dopit, Dopit?" The elephant is clueless until Mr. Dizzy ties a knot in the elephant's trunk, causing him to say to Mr. Dizzy, "Dop it! Dop it!" and, addressing the readers, "I duppose doo dink dat's fuddy."

In earlier printings, Mr. Dizzy was dark brown, but as of later printings, he is light brown. Mr. Dizzy appears under the titles Monsieur Nigaud (French), Ο Κύριος Χαζούλης (Greek), 傷腦筋先生 (Taiwan), 우둔씨 (Korean), Unser Herr Dussel (German), Meneertje Suizebol (Dutch), Fætter Dumbum (Danish), מר טושטוש (Hebrew), Senhor Bobo (Portuguese), and Domnul Dus (Romanian).

== F ==
=== Mr. Fib ===
Mr. Fib
- Author: Adam Hargreaves
- Illustrator: Adam Hargreaves
- Language: English
- Series: Mr. Men
- Genre: Children's literature
- Publisher: Egmont Books
- Publication date: 12 September 2024
- Publication place: United Kingdom
- Preceded by: Mr. Calm

Mr. Fib is the 51st book in the Mr. Men series by Roger Hargreaves and the eighth one created by Adam Hargreaves.

=== Mr. Forgetful ===
Mr. Forgetful
- Author: Roger Hargreaves
- Illustrator: Roger Hargreaves
- Language: English
- Series: Mr. Men
- Genre: Children's literature
- Publisher: Egmont Books
- Publication date: 19 January 1976
- Publication place: United Kingdom
- ISBN: 978-0-7214-2243-5
- Preceded by: Mr. Daydream
- Followed by: Mr. Jelly

Mr. Forgetful is the 14th book in the Mr. Men series by Roger Hargreaves. Mr. Forgetful has a short memory. This is not particularly useful. One day he has to remember a message for Farmer Fields to say that there is a sheep loose in the lane. Does he remember the message? Sadly, no, for he says "there is a goose asleep in the rain". Mr. Forgetful appears under the titles Monsieur Étourdi (French), Don Memorion (Spanish), Unser Herr Vergesslich (German), Meneertje Vergeetal (Dutch), 健忘先生 (Taiwan), 잊어씨 (Korean), Ο Κύριος Ξεχασιάρης (Greek), Bay Unutkan (Turkish), Fætter Glemsom (Danish), מר שכחן (Hebrew), and Senhor Esquecido (Portuguese).

=== Mr. Fun ===
Mr. Fun has had an activity book in a toy store. There was also a costume made for him.

He is possibly Little Miss Fun's brother.

=== Mr. Funny ===
Mr. Funny
- Author: Roger Hargreaves
- Illustrator: Roger Hargreaves
- Language: English
- Series: Mr. Men
- Genre: Children's literature
- Publication date: 19 January 1976
- Publication place: United Kingdom
- Preceded by: Mr. Lazy
- Followed by: Mr. Mean

Mr. Funny is the 18th book in the Mr. Men series by Roger Hargreaves. Mr. Funny lived inside a large teapot. So he decided to go out for a funny drive. While he was driving along the road, a Large Pig laughed to see his car (shaped like a shoe) and a worm laughed as well. Eventually Mr. Funny came to some signposts. One of them says "This way to the zoo." Unfortunately, all the animals at the zoo are sad. He ends up cheering up the zoo animals with his jokes and humour before driving home again. No one has a sense of humour like Mr. Funny.

He is now a character in The Mr. Men Show, during its second season. He almost looks the same, but his flower and gloves are absent and has a white and red polka-dotted bow tie, his hat is also bent and he has Mr. Rude's nose, only it's red. In the show, Mr. Funny never spoke, and all of his sketches are done in mime and he acts like a clown, his only noises being the sounds of horns and whistles, similar to comedian Harpo Marx.

Mr. Funny appears under the titles Monsieur Rigolo (French), Don Bromista (Spanish), Unser Herr Lustig (German), Meneertje Grappig/Meneertje Grapjas (Dutch), Ο Κύριος Αστείος (Greek), 趣味先生 (Taiwan), 웃겨씨 (Korean), Herra Fyndinn (Icelandic), and Senhor Engraçado (Portuguese).

=== Mr. Fussy ===
Mr. Fussy
- Author: Roger Hargreaves
- Illustrator: Roger Hargreaves
- Language: English
- Series: Mr. Men
- Genre: Children's literature
- Publisher: Ladybird Books
- Publication date: 14 April 1976
- Publication place: United Kingdom
- ISBN: 978-0-7214-2254-1
- Preceded by: Mr. Chatterbox
- Followed by: Mr. Bounce

Mr. Fussy is the 21st book in the Mr. Men series by Roger Hargreaves. Mr. Fussy is a perfectionist. He would not tolerate anything imperfect. Mr. Fussy keeps his hair combed, his moustache trimmed, his shoelaces tied, his house very neat, and goes as far as keeping the blades of his grass perfectly straight. He is also a very fussy eater - when he is having breakfast, he discovers that his marmalade has bits in it and spends the rest of the morning removing the bits from the marmalade. One evening, he is working when his cousin from Australia, Mr. Clumsy, comes to visit. Mr. Clumsy causes chaos and at the end of his stay, everything in the house is disastrous. However, things just get worse for Mr. Fussy as shortly after Mr Clumsy leaves, a friend, Mr. Bump, comes to visit.

In earlier prints, Mr. Fussy's shoes were red, but as of more recent prints, they are bright orange. In the 2008 TV series The Mr. Men Show, he was renamed Mr. Persnickety (Mr. Pernickety in the UK version; both are another word for fussy) and was coloured light green in Season 1. He was renamed back to Mr. Fussy in Season 2, retaining his look from the first season, albeit now appearing in his normal dark green colour (though he was miscoloured to his Season 1 colour in a shot in the episode "Cinema" and Mr. Messy changing him to his Season 1 colour in the episode "Home Improvement"). His catchphrases are "Mr. Messy!" and "Sweet Henrietta!" ("Sweet apple strudel!" in the UK version, in line with his German accent in that version). Mr. Fussy can play the piano (both his concerts were ruined by Mr. Rude and to that extent, if unintentionally, Little Miss Chatterbox), the cello, and the harp. He is also very clean and will not tolerate anything dirty as well as being fussy about details. He retains his yellow nose and neatly combed hair but was given a black bow tie, reading glasses, brown shoes and a more neatly waxed moustache. He lives next door to Mr. Messy in a duplex-style house. He despairs (even crying) at the end of almost all of his scenes. He often gets kicked out or yelled at when he is using his temper on another Mr. Man or Little Miss (such as Mr. Messy, Mr. Rude and Little Miss Naughty) and he has terrible classes. He and Mr. Messy often are at odds. In the US and UK Versions, he is voiced by Joey D'Auria (credited as Joseph J. Terry) and Rob Rackstraw, respectively.

Mr. Fussy appears under the title Monsieur Tatillon (French), Don Quisquilloso (Mexican Spanish), Unser Herr Ordentlich (German), Meneertje Precies (Dutch), Ο Κύριος Ιδιότροπου (Greek), 挑剔先生 (Taiwan), 꼼꼼씨 (Korean), and Senhor Esnobe (Portuguese).

== G ==
=== Mr. Gap ===
Mr. Gap is a character who is based on the store GAP.

=== Mr. Glug ===
Mr. Glug is the Mr. Men mascot of Evian, created to boost sales of Evian Water.

=== Mr. Good ===
Mr. Good
- Author: Adam Hargreaves
- Illustrator: Adam Hargreaves
- Language: English
- Series: Mr. Men
- Genre: Children's literature
- Publication date: 4 April 2003
- Publication place: United Kingdom
- Pages: 38 pp
- ISBN: 978-0-7498-5898-8
- Preceded by: Mr. Rude
- Followed by: Mr. Nobody

Mr. Good is the 46th book in the Mr. Men series by Roger Hargreaves and the third one created by Adam Hargreaves. Mr. Good is good, in a town called Badland, where everyone is bad. Mr. Good decides to take a long walk and ends up in Goodland. He lives there now. Mr. Good appears under the titles Monsieur Gentil (French), O Κύριος Καλοσυνάτος (Greek), Don Bueno (Spanish), Senhor Bonzinho (Portuguese), 好心先生 (Mandarin), and Il Signor Buon (Italian).

=== Mr. Greedy ===
Mr. Greedy
- Author: Roger Hargreaves
- Illustrator: Roger Hargreaves
- Language: English
- Series: Mr. Men
- Genre: Children's literature
- Publisher: Fabbri
- Publication date: 10 August 1971
- Publication place: United Kingdom
- Pages: 40 pp
- ISBN: 978-0-85396-000-3
- Preceded by: Mr. Tickle
- Followed by: Mr. Happy

Mr. Greedy is the 2nd book in the Mr. Men series, by Roger Hargreaves. His story begins with Mr. Greedy waking up and having his overly large daily breakfast. He then goes on a walk afterwards and finds his way into a cave where everything is larger than life and he begins to explore, finding larger-than-normal food. Mr. Greedy is then picked up by a giant who then teaches him a lesson and makes him eat all the giant food, making Mr. Greedy end up bigger and feel like he would burst at any moment. The giant agrees to let him go as long as he promises to never be greedy again. Mr. Greedy promises and then at the end, he is still keeping the promise and now has lost some weight, and it shows him looking much thinner at the end of the book.

Mr. Greedy's shape is now officially that of an eight, similar to Mr. Dizzy, but in earlier illustrations, he was a slightly different shape with little to no neck. Mr. Greedy appears under the titles Monsieur Glouton (French), Don Glotón (Spanish), Mr. Barus (Welsh), Unser Herr Nimmersatt (German), 먹보씨 (Korean), Meneertje Smikkel/Meneertje Vreetzak (Dutch), 貪吃先生 (Taiwan), Ο Κύριος Λαίμαργος (Greek), Fætter Grådig (Danish), Gubben Glufs Glufs (Sweden), מר חמדן (Hebrew).

=== Mr. Grumble ===
Mr. Grumble
- Author: Viviane Cohen and Evelyne Lallemand
- Illustrator: Colette David
- Language: English
- Series: Mr. Men
- Genre: Children's literature
- Publication date: 9 May 1990 (France); 1994 (UK)
- Publication place: France; United Kingdom
- Preceded by: Mr. Brave
- Followed by: Mr. Perfect

Mr. Grumble is the 41st book in the Mr. Men series by Roger Hargreaves. Mr. Grumble is the second grumpiest man in the world after Mr. Grumpy. "Bah!" says Mr. Grumble. He hates laughter and singing. He hates people being on the table pretending to be a clown. He even hates being turned into a pig. This is what happens when he grumbles: when Mr. Grumble meets a wizard, Mr. Grumble will turn into a pig when his grumbling happens. Mr. Grumble appears under the titles Monsieur Grognon (French), Unser Herr Motz (German), 抱怨先生 (Taiwan), Ο Κύριος Γκρινιάρης (Greek), and Senhor Reclamão (Portuguese).

=== Mr. Grumpy ===
Mr. Grumpy
- Author: Roger Hargreaves
- Illustrator: Roger Hargreaves
- Language: English
- Series: Mr. Men
- Genre: Children's literature
- Publication date: 5 March 1978
- Publication place: United Kingdom
- Preceded by: Mr. Strong
- Followed by: Mr. Clumsy

Mr. Grumpy is the 27th book in the Mr. Men series by Roger Hargreaves. Mr. Grumpy is the grumpiest person in the world. He's always in a bad mood, hating anyone or anything he comes across. He can't stand books so he tears out all of the pages, and he is rude to Mr. Happy who comes to visit. Mr. Happy makes Mr. Tickle tickle Mr. Grumpy if he is mean to somebody, working because it makes Mr. Grumpy nicer. He laughs out happier. Nowadays, when he picks up a book, he only tears out one page.

In the 2008 TV series The Mr. Men Show, Mr. Grumpy kept his blue colour, big, blue nose, and rectangular body. However, he wears a crooked hat with a stripe instead of a top hat, but retains its green colour; he looks much more mature and so does his voice. Unlike in the books, he actually enjoys reading. He is a frequent victim of Mr. Tickle and is quite bitter about it, going so far as to invent the Tickle Protector to ward him off. He strongly dislikes Mr. Tickle and Mr. Scatterbrain, due to frequent incidents with them and is annoyed by happiness. His catchphrase is "Crooked cucumbers!". Like Mr. Small and Mr. Bump, his favourite food is liverwurst sandwiches, as mentioned in Beach and Construction. His favourite TV show is called "Trout Tuesday", which has been run at least once by Mr. Lazy. According to what he said in the episode Farm, he was raised in the country. In the episode Dance, he was writing his life story (and was continuously interrupted by Mr. Noisy's dance class upstairs), which he sold in Books. He also now lives in a small brown house with signs that say "Go away" and have frowns on them in his front yard, and a vegetable garden with a peach orchard in his backyard (which Mr. Scatterbrain and Little Miss Whoops ruined). He is polite and civil to anyone he talks to, but is very vocal about his opinions and can be rather cynical, sarcastic, jaded and even brusque at times. In the US version, he is voiced by Sam Gold and in the UK version, he is voiced by Simon Greenall.

Mr. Grumpy appears under the titles Monsieur Grincheux (French), Don Malhumorado (Spanish), 暴躁先生 (Taiwan), Ο Κύριος Κατσούφης (Greek), Unser Herr Griesgram (German), Senhor Rabugento (Portuguese), and คุณหงุดหงิด (Thai).

== H ==
=== Mr. Happy ===
Mr. Happy
- Author: Roger Hargreaves
- Illustrator: Roger Hargreaves
- Language: English
- Series: Mr. Men
- Genre: Children's literature
- Publisher: Fabbri
- Publication date: 10 August 1971
- Pages: 40 pp
- ISBN: 978-0-85396-001-0
- Preceded by: Mr. Greedy
- Followed by: Mr. Nosey

Mr. Happy is the 3rd book in the Mr. Men series. Mr. Happy discovers Mr. Miserable (who looks exactly like him) and helps him become happy.

Mr. Happy in the 2008 TV series The Mr. Men Show looked exactly as he did in the books, and co-hosts a morning show called "Good Morning Dillydale" with Little Miss Sunshine. His catchphrase is "Wonderful!". He also has a deepish voice, sounding like a stereotypical game show host. In the US and UK versions, he is voiced by Sam Gold, Simon Greenall (Season 1) and Rob Rackstraw (Season 2), respectively.

Mr. Happy has also spent many years as the official face of Glasgow's Miles Better campaign.

Mr. Happy appears under the titles Monsieur Heureux (French), Don Feliz (Spanish), Mr. Hapus (Welsh), Unser Herr Glücklich (German), Meneertje Blij/Meneertje Vrolijk (Dutch), Ο Κύριος Χαρούμενος (Greek), 快樂先生 (Taiwan), 행복씨 (Korean), Fætter Glad (Danish), Gubben Lycklig (Swedish), Senhor Feliz (Portuguese), מר שמח (Hebrew), and Il Signor Allegro (Italian).

== I ==
=== Mr. Impossible ===
Mr. Impossible
- Author: Roger Hargreaves
- Illustrator: Roger Hargreaves
- Language: English
- Series: Mr. Men
- Genre: Children's literature
- Publication date: 14 April 1976
- Publication place: United Kingdom
- Preceded by: Mr. Dizzy
- Followed by: Mr. Strong

Mr. Impossible is the 25th book in the Mr. Men series by Roger Hargreaves. Nothing is impossible to Mr. Impossible. He can do anything. He has magic powers similar to Little Miss Magic and even uses his powers to motivate people. One day he goes to school with a boy named William. He proves he can do anything in some amazing ways! He is purple with a blue top hat.

Mr. Impossible appears under the titles Monsieur Incroyable (French), Don Imposible (Spanish), Unser Herr Unmöglich (German), 불가능없어씨 (Korean), 萬事通先生 (Taiwan), Ο Κύριος Απίθανος (Greek), Meneertje Onmogelijk (Dutch), and Senhor Impossível (Portuguese).

== J ==
=== Mr. Jelly ===
Mr. Jelly
- Author: Roger Hargreaves
- Illustrator: Roger Hargreaves
- Language: English
- Series: Mr. Men
- Genre: Children's literature
- Publisher: Ladybird Books
- Publication date: 19 January 1976
- Publication place: United Kingdom
- ISBN: 978-0-7214-2233-6
- Preceded by: Mr. Forgetful
- Followed by: Mr. Noisy

Mr. Jelly is the 15th book in the Mr. Men series. Mr. Jelly is afraid of everything, such as the snapping of a twig. He often hides under the covers. One day, he finds a tramp sleeping in the woods, whom he is afraid of until the vagabond teaches him to count to ten whenever he feels nervous. This makes Mr. Jelly a calm fellow and he rarely hides under the covers now.

Mr. Jelly appears under the titles Mr. Nervous (Note: Mr. Nervous is both Mr. Jelly's US name and his name in The Mr. Men Show.) (USA), Monsieur Peureux (French), Don Miedica (Spanish), Unser Herr Angsthase (German), Ο Κύριος Φοβητσιάρης (Greek), 겁쟁이씨 (Korean), 緊張先生 (Taiwan), Meneertje Doodsbenauwd (Dutch), and Senhor Tremilique (Portuguese).

== L ==
=== Mr. Lazy ===
Mr. Lazy
- Author: Roger Hargreaves
- Illustrator: Roger Hargreaves
- Language: English
- Series: Mr. Men
- Genre: Children's literature
- Publication date: 19 January 1976
- Publication place: United Kingdom
- Preceded by: Mr. Noisy
- Followed by: Mr. Funny

Mr. Lazy is the 17th book in the Mr. Men series by Roger Hargreaves. Mr. Lazy is lazy, he lives in Sleepyland, where there are only four hours a day, as opposed to 24, and it takes two regular hours for water to boil and three regular hours for bread to toast. One day, Mr. Lazy sits down for a nap and is awoken by Mr. Busy and Mr. Bustle. They overwork him, until Mr. Bustle blows a whistle, requiring Mr. Lazy to run as fast as he can. Mr. Lazy runs, but his legs don't get him anywhere because he is sitting on a chair in the garden. He wakes up, realising it was all a dream, and the whistle was the kettle boiling in the kitchen. He sits down to have breakfast, and he goes to sleep yet again only for the events in the dream to really happen.

In the 2008 TV series The Mr. Men Show, he is more "lazy" rather than "sleepy" as he was in the books and hates work. His colour is changed from light-pink to sea-green, his shape is now changed into a human-shaped body, he now has a dark green nose, and his hat is now changed into a pink or red newsboy-style cap that covers his eyes. He also wears socks and flip-flops. He lives in a camper-style trailer, with the garbage cans and mailbox overfilled with trash and mail, respectively. Mr. Lazy speaks with a monotone voice that sounds like Eeyore's from Winnie The Pooh. His catchphrases are "This is exhausting", "Woah!", and "This is too much work". In the US and UK Versions, he is voiced by Phil Lollar and Tim Whitnall respectively.

Mr. Lazy appears under the titles Monsieur Endormi (French), Don Vago (Spanish), Unser Herr Faulpelz (German), Meneertje Luilak (Dutch), 懶惰先生 (Taiwan), 게을러씨 (Korean), Ο Κύριος Τεμπέλης (Greek), Fætter Sløv (Danish), Herra Latur (Icelandic), and Senhor Preguiçoso (Portuguese).

== M ==
=== Mr. Marvellous ===
Mr. Marvellous
- Author: Adam Hargreaves
- Illustrator: Adam Hargreaves
- Language: English
- Series: Mr. Men
- Genre: Children's literature
- Publication date: July 2016
- Publication place: United Kingdom
- Preceded by: Mr. Nobody
- Followed by: Mr. Adventure

Mr. Marvellous is the 48th book in the Mr. Men series by Roger Hargreaves. Mr. Marvellous is blue and oval-shaped with green hair and orange shoes. Mr. Marvellous' ability is to do marvellous things, such as run quickly or become invisible.

Mr. Marvellous was published as Monsieur Formidable in French and Don Maravilloso in Spanish.

=== Mr. Mean ===
Mr. Mean
- Author: Roger Hargreaves
- Illustrator: Roger Hargreaves
- Language: English
- Series: Mr. Men
- Genre: Children's literature
- Publisher: Ladybird Books
- Publication date: 19 January 1976
- Publication place: United Kingdom
- ISBN: 978-0-7214-2235-0
- Preceded by: Mr. Funny
- Followed by: Mr. Chatterbox

Mr. Mean is the 19th book in the Mr. Men series by Roger Hargreaves. Mr. Mean is a miser who never spends a penny of his money. He is so mean he gives his brother a piece of coal for Christmas. One day a wizard starts disguising himself as a number of people in need. Each time Mr. Mean rejects helping them, a spell is placed on a part of his body, such as his nose turning into a carrot, and his ears turning into tomatoes. He gives help when he realises his feet are about to fall under a spell. Then he spends his money, and now he gives his brother two pieces of coal for Christmas. Mr. Mean appears under the titles Mr. Stingy (USA), Monsieur Avare (French), Don Tacañete (Spanish), Unser Herr Geizig (German), 구두쇠씨 (Korean), Senhor Cruel (Portuguese), 吝嗇先生 (Taiwan), Ο Κύριος Τσιγκούνης (Greek), Meneertje Gierig (Dutch).

Mr. Mean also appears in the grown-up business book Mr. Mean's Guide to Management.

=== Mr. Messy ===
Mr. Messy
- Author: Roger Hargreaves
- Illustrator: Roger Hargreaves
- Language: English
- Series: Mr. Men
- Genre: Children's literature
- Publisher: Fabbri
- Publication date: 15 August 1972
- Publication place: United Kingdom
- Pages: 40 pp
- ISBN: 978-0-85396-017-1
- Preceded by: Mr. Snow
- Followed by: Mr. Topsy-Turvy

Mr. Messy is the 8th book in the Mr. Men series by Roger Hargreaves. Mr. Messy is pink and really messy but has a really nice smile. Mr. Messy lives in a messy house until Mr. Neat and Mr. Tidy come to clean his house and give him a bath (his first ever, as the bathroom had previously been the messiest of the house). He becomes neat and thinks he has to change his name. Mr. Messy then becomes clean.

In the 2008 TV series The Mr. Men Show, Mr. Messy is not only messy but unclean and unhygienic also, notably more than he is messy, and he acts more like a fun-loving teenager who loves to party a lot, slightly similar to that of Jeff Spicoli from Fast Times at Ridgemont High. He was given blue and white sneakers (similar to Little Miss Chatterbox's, only with patches of dirt on the toes, and both on occasion in the show and in his character image, one of them with untied laces), and his limbs are also made solid, instead of scribbled like they were originally. Also, his house is no longer by itself in a messy field. He lives right next door to Mr. Persnickety (U.S.) / Mr. Pernickety (UK) (originally named Mr. Fussy in the book series and also in the second series) in a duplex-styled house. He also owns a pizzeria. His catchphrases are "Shazam!" and "That's what I'm talkin' about!". On the website, he says "Messy, not dressy". In the US and UK Versions, he is voiced by series art director, Peter Rida Michail, and Rob Rackstraw.

Mr. Messy appears under the titles Monsieur Sale (French), Don Lioso (Spanish), Meneertje Knoeipot/Meneertje Sloddervos (Dutch), Ο Κύριος Τσαπατσούλης (Greek), 邋遢先生 (Taiwan), 너절씨 (Korean), Mr. Anniben (Welsh), Unser Herr Schlampig (German), Bay Dağınık (Turkish), Fætter Sjusk (Danish), Herr Rotekopp (Norwegian), מר שלומפר (Hebrew), Herra Subbi (Icelandic), and Senhor Desmazelado (Portuguese).

In the 50 Years of Mr. Men documentary, Adam Hargreaves said that he was possibly the easiest character to draw.

=== Mr. Metal ===
Mr. Metal is a minor character in The Mr. Men Show who only appeared in the episode "Robots". He was created by Little Miss Naughty so she could take over Good Morning Dillydale. He repeatedly asks to be the host, but Mr. Happy turns him down which leads to him shrinking him and Little Miss Sunshine and taking the role of host by force, also shrinking Miss Naughty as well. He is voiced by Godfrey (credited as Godfrey Danchimah).

=== Mr. Mischief ===
Mr. Mischief
- Author: Roger Hargreaves
- Illustrator: Roger Hargreaves
- Language: English
- Series: Mr. Men
- Genre: Children's literature
- Publication date: 18 March 1978
- Publication place: United Kingdom
- Preceded by: Mr. Skinny
- Followed by: Mr. Clever

Mr. Mischief is the 36th book in the Mr. Men series by Roger Hargreaves. Mr. Mischief is really mischievous and plays tricks on everybody. He breaks Mr. Happy's chair and gives Mr. Greedy a cake in which the chocolate is really mud, the cream inside is really cotton, and the icing is really toothpaste (slightly reminiscent of the queen giving Snow White a poison apple in Snow White and the Seven Dwarfs) and puts treacle in Mr. Funny's hat. One day, Mr. Mischief tries to steal a wizard's wand and swap it for a piece of wood, but the wizard stops him and teaches Mr. Mischief a lesson by turning the tables on Mr. Mischief. Mr. Mischief is good as gold until he then cuts Mr. Fussy's moustache in half. Mr. Mischief appears under the titles Monsieur Farceur (French), Meneertje Kattekwaad (Dutch), Ο Κύριος Σκανταλιάρης (Greek), 惡作劇先生 (Taiwan), 장난씨 (Korean), Unser Herr Schabernack (German), and Senhor Brincalhão (Portuguese).

=== Mr. Miserable ===
Mr. Miserable is part of the Mr. Men series of books, by Roger Hargreaves. Mr. Miserable only appears in one story, that of Mr. Happy. He lives in a room deep underground which is accessed by a door in a tree. He is the spitting image of Mr. Happy, except that he is as miserable as Mr. Happy is happy. He wants to be happy but decides that he is just miserable by nature. Mr. Happy invites his new friend to stay at his cottage for a while and there Mr. Miserable learns to be happy and even falls about with laughter, with Mr. Happy and others joining in.

=== Mr. Mo ===
Mr. Mo
- Author: Adam Hargreaves
- Illustrator: Adam Hargreaves
- Language: English
- Series: Mr. Men
- Genre: Children's literature
- Publication date: 23 October 2013
- Publication place: United Kingdom
- Pages: 36
- ISBN: 1409388700

Mr. Mo is part of the Mr. Men series of books, by Roger Hargreaves. Mr. Mo only appears in the Mr. Mo book published in 2013 in conjunction with the Movember men's health charity campaign. Mr. Mo was published in hardback in Australia, and digitally by Amazon in some parts of the world. In the book, Mr. Mo has his moustache shaven off while at the barber, and has a change in personality. He only returns to normal after growing the moustache back.

His name changed afterwards to Mr. Moustache.

=== Mr. Moustache ===
See Mr. Mo.

=== Mr. Muddle ===
Mr. Muddle
- Author: Roger Hargreaves
- Illustrator: Roger Hargreaves
- Language: English
- Series: Mr. Men
- Genre: Children's literature
- Publication date: 14 April 1976
- Publication place: United Kingdom
- Preceded by: Mr. Bounce
- Followed by: Mr. Dizzy

Mr. Muddle is the 23rd book in the Mr. Men series by Roger Hargreaves. Mr. Muddle gets everything mixed up. He lives in a house by the sea near Seatown. He was supposed to live in the country, but he, who built this house, built it wrong and in the wrong spot. One day he goes fishing with a fisherman named George and does the wrong things, and they don't catch any fish. George's technique is to ask Mr. Muddle to do the opposite of what George wants, and Mr. Muddle will get it right. George gets everybody to do this, and Mr. Muddle goes home and cooks himself a muddled-up meal to celebrate.

He is not to be confused with a human of the same name from the book Mr. Silly.

Despite not appearing in The Mr. Men Show, his face can be seen in the beginning of the intro.

Mr. Muddle appears under the titles Monsieur Méli-Mélo (French), Don Confuso (Spanish), Unser Herr Durcheinander (German), Ο Κύριος Μπερδεμένος (Greek), 엉망씨 (Korean), 糊塗先生 (Taiwan), Meneertje Stuntel (Dutch).

== N ==
=== Mr. Nervous ===
See Mr. Jelly.

=== Mr. No ===
Mr. No is part of the Mr. Men series of books, by Roger Hargreaves. He always disagrees with everyone on everything. Mr. No appears under the titles Monsieur Non (French), Ο Κύριος Όχι (Greek). Although he doesn't appear in any other books, he does have his own learning card in the Mr. Men and Little Miss Learning Card Pack.

=== Mr. No (Mishaps and Mayhem) ===
Mr. No is a Mr. Man who appeared exclusively in the app Mr. Men: Mishaps and Mayhem. He is most notably featured in Little Miss Scary's minigame in the app.

Mr. No is the first character to share his name with another character, the French-exclusive Mr. No. His name may not have been Mr. No if the French-exclusive character was translated into English.

=== Mr. Nobody ===
Mr. Nobody
- Author: Roger Hargreaves
- Illustrator: Roger Hargreaves and Adam Hargreaves
- Language: English
- Series: Mr. Men
- Genre: Children's literature
- Publication date: 1985 / March 2010
- Publication place: United Kingdom
- Preceded by: Mr. Good
- Followed by: Mr. Marvelous

Mr. Nobody is the 47th book in the Mr. Men series by Roger Hargreaves. Mr. Happy finds somebody who is nobody. Mr. Nobody is literally not much of a person. Mr. Nobody appears under the titles Monsieur Personne (French), and 沒人先生 (Mandarin).

=== Mr. Noisy ===
Mr. Noisy
- Author: Roger Hargreaves
- Illustrator: Roger Hargreaves
- Language: English
- Series: Mr. Men
- Genre: Children's literature
- Publication date: 19 January 1976
- Publication place: United Kingdom
- Preceded by: Mr. Jelly
- Followed by: Mr. Lazy

Mr. Noisy is the 16th book in the Mr. Men series by Roger Hargreaves. Mr. Noisy is always loud. He lives on the top of a hill and must go to Wobbletown at the bottom of the hill to do errands. He shouts to Mrs. Crumb, the baker, "I'D LIKE A LOAF OF BREAD!" and he shouts to Mr. Bacon, the butcher, "I'D LIKE A PIECE OF MEAT!" Having just about had it with Mr. Noisy's noisiness, Mrs. Crumb and Mr. Bacon come up with a plan. The next day, when Mr. Noisy goes shopping at both their shops again, Mrs. Crumb and Mr. Bacon just pretend not to hear him. The next day, when Mr. Noisy tries again at both shops, he realises that he has to be quiet if he's to get what he wants. He also learns not to clump his shoes, not to open and shut doors loudly, and he also learns to whisper.

In the 2008 TV series The Mr. Men Show, Mr. Noisy remains relatively the same in terms of appearance, though his shoes are changed from orange to brown and he is given a megaphone-styled bullhorn to emphasise his character trait. His boots make loud stomping sounds when he walks. He lives next door to Mr. Quiet in a stereo-shaped house. His catchphrase is "I CAN'T HEAR YOU!" and occasionally "THIS IS SUPER!". His last appearance was in the episode "Travel", where he turned into a giant, red, loud whale by Little Miss Magic after he said that he was as thirsty as a whale, but he may appear in a new season someday. In the US and UK versions, he is voiced by Richard Epcar and Rob Rackstraw, respectively.

Mr. Noisy appears under the titles Monsieur Bruit (French), Don Ruidoso (Spanish), Unser Herr Laut (German), Ο Κύριος Φασαρίας (Greek), 시끄럼씨 (Korean), 吵鬧先生 (Taiwan), Meneertje Brulmans (Dutch), מר קולרם (Hebrew), and Senhor Barulhento (Portuguese).

=== Mr. Nonsense ===
Mr. Nonsense
- Author: Roger Hargreaves
- Illustrator: Roger Hargreaves
- Language: English
- Series: Mr. Men
- Genre: Children's literature
- Publisher: Ladybird Books
- Publication date: 18 March 1978
- Publication place: United Kingdom
- ISBN: 978-0-7214-2253-4
- Preceded by: Mr. Worry
- Followed by: Mr. Wrong

Mr. Nonsense is the 33rd book in the Mr. Men series by Roger Hargreaves. Mr. Nonsense lives in Nonsenseland, in a house on top of a tree. When Mr. Happy asks him why he lives in a tree, his answer is: "I tried living on the ground, but it was too high up, so I moved to a tree to be nearer the ground". Then, when Mr. Nosey asks him why he eats porridge on toast, his answer is: "I tried porridge sandwiches and I didn't like them." Then when Mr. Strong asks him why he sleeps in a rowing boat, his answer is: "I tried sleeping in a motorboat and it was somewhat uncomfortable." Mr. Nonsense is best friends with ‘Mr. Silly’. Once, when it snows yellow snow, they go for a toboggan in Mr. Nonsense's rowing boat bed and build square snowballs somehow. They then eat porridge pie for supper. At the end of the book, it is revealed that they both play draughts wrong. Mr. Nonsense appears under the titles Monsieur Bizarre (French), Unser Herr Unsinn (German), Meneertje Onzin (Dutch), 荒唐先生 (Taiwan), 터무니없어씨 (Korean), Senhor Sem Noção (Portuguese), and Ο Κύριος Κουταμάρας (Greek).

=== Mr. Nosey ===
Mr. Nosey
- Author: Roger Hargreaves
- Illustrator: Roger Hargreaves
- Language: English
- Series: Mr. Men
- Genre: Children's literature
- Publisher: Fabbri
- Publication date: 10 August 1971
- Publication place: United Kingdom
- Pages: 40 pp
- ISBN: 978-0-85396-002-7
- Preceded by: Mr. Happy
- Followed by: Mr. Sneeze

Mr. Nosey is the 4th book in the Mr. Men series by Roger Hargreaves. Mr. Nosey is represented as being a prying character, who invades the privacy of other people, creating a point of conflict in the book. In retaliation, the other characters assault his nose, which reforms Mr. Nosey.

In earlier illustrations, Mr. Nosey's nose was much longer and less pronounced than it is in newer illustrations. In the 2008 TV series The Mr. Men Show, Mr. Nosey is light green and has a shape similar to that of Mr. Greedy (therefore giving him a nose-like appearance), his nose is an orange oval, has one curl of hair, and wears a black necktie. His name is also spelt as Mr. Nosy in the US broadcast. He is often seen with his best friend Mr. Small. He may be stronger than Mr. Strong, and often when he jumps he breaks things, like in the Lake episode where he breaks the wooden platform. His catchphrase is "Just looking". He lives with Mr. Small in an observatory with a large telescope that comes out of the roof. In the US and UK versions, he is voiced by Rick Zieff (credited as Danny Katiana) and Steve Kynman, respectively.

== P ==
=== Mr. Perfect ===
Mr. Perfect
- Author: Viviane Cohen and Evelyne Lallemand
- Illustrator: Colette David
- Language: English
- Series: Mr. Men
- Genre: Children's literature
- Publication date: 9 May 1990 (France); 1994 (UK)
- Publication place: France; United Kingdom
- Preceded by: Mr. Grumble
- Followed by: Mr. Cheerful

Mr. Perfect is the 42nd book in the Mr. Men series by Roger Hargreaves. Everything about Mr. Perfect is just perfect. He never has a bad day or anything, although he gets in trouble by Mr. Uppity or Mr. Grumpy. Mr. Perfect appears under the titles Monsieur Parfait (French), Don Perfecto (Spanish), Ο Κύριος Τέλειος (Greek), 完美先生 (Mandarin), Senhor Perfeito (Portuguese), and Unser Herr Perfekt (German).

=== Mr. Pernickety ===
See Mr. Fussy.

Mr. Pernickety (Known as Mr. Persnickety in the US) is the name given to Mr. Fussy as he appears in the 2008 Mr. Men Show.

=== Mr. Poirot ===
Mr. Poirot is a new character created as homage to Agatha Christie's fictional detective Hercule Poirot, appearing in the 2025 book Mischief on the Nile. and the 2026 book Mystery on the Opulent Express. He is a yellow, bean-shaped Mr. Man, sporting a curly handlebar mustache, bowler hat, and black cane. In addition, a new Little Miss character, Little Miss Marple, was revealed alongside Mr. Poirot.

== Q ==
=== Mr. Quiet ===
Mr. Quiet
- Author: Roger Hargreaves
- Illustrator: Roger Hargreaves
- Language: English
- Series: Mr. Men
- Genre: Children's literature
- Publisher: Ladybird Books
- Publication date: 5 March 1978
- Publication place: United Kingdom
- ISBN: 978-0-7214-2261-9
- Preceded by: Mr. Clumsy
- Followed by: Mr. Rush

Mr. Quiet is the 29th book in the Mr. Men series by Roger Hargreaves. Mr. Quiet lives in Loudland, where everybody and everything is too loud for him. Loudland would be suitable for Mr. Noisy, but not for Mr. Quiet. Mr. Quiet is scared. Whenever he tries to go shopping, he can only whisper what he wants, which results in the grocer, the milkman, the baker, and the butcher shouting "CAN'T HEAR YOU! NEXT PLEASE!" One day, Mr. Quiet gets a letter from Mr. Happy to stay in Happyland, where Mr. Quiet gets a job in a library, where the rule is to always be quiet. Mr. Quiet is so happy he laughs out loud.

In the 2008 TV series The Mr. Men Show, Mr. Quiet is of a normal size instead of a small size like in the books, he changed his colour from light brown to light blue, and two of his hairs are gone. He also lives next door to Mr. Noisy in a small shack-like house, with a Zen Garden. In some situations where other characters he is with are debating, only he is aware of the dangers around them, even if he is subject to dangerous situations himself. He has a taste for Asian things, such as Chinese vases (as seen in "Music") and a zen garden (as seen in "Gardens"), perhaps an allusion to the "quiet Asian" stereotype. He has a barely audible accent, which can cause confusion with some other characters. His catchphrase is "Not so loud!" In the US and UK versions, he is voiced by Paul Greenberg (credited as Aaron Albertus) and Simon Greenall, respectively.

Mr. Quiet appears under the titles Monsieur Silence (French), Don Silencioso (Spanish), Don Calladito (Mexican Spanish), 조용씨 (Korean), 安靜先生 (Taiwan), Ο Κύριος Ήσυχος (Greek), Unser Herr Leise (German), and Senhor Silêncio (Portuguese).

=== Mr. Quiffy ===
Mr. Quiffy is the Mr. Men Mascot of the HOH x Mr. Men on the website of WGSN Insider.

== R ==
=== Mr. Right ===
Mr. Right appears in Mr. Wrong's book. Mr. Right looks similar to Mr. Wrong.

=== Mr. Rude ===
Mr. Rude
- Author: Adam Hargreaves
- Illustrator: Adam Hargreaves
- Language: English
- Series: Mr. Men
- Genre: Children's literature
- Publication date: 3 April 2003
- Publication place: United Kingdom
- Pages: 38 pp
- ISBN: 978-0-7498-5851-3
- Preceded by: Mr. Cool
- Followed by: Mr. Good

Mr. Rude is the 45th book in the Mr. Men series by Roger Hargreaves and the second one created by Adam Hargreaves. Mr. Rude is a red Mr. Man with a black hat, a rounded triangle body, a dark red nose, he also has a French accent (alluding to the stereotype that the French are rude people) and, as his name suggests, is rude to everyone. He insults a man with a big nose and an overweight woman. To the overweight woman, he says "Fatty! You're supposed to eat the things in the fridge, not eat the fridge as well!" Mr. Rude is published as Monsieur Mal-Élevé in French, Don Grosero in Spanish, O Κύριος Αγενής in Greek, Senhor Rude in Portuguese, and 粗魯先生 in Mandarin.

In the 2008 TV series The Mr. Men Show, Mr. Rude keeps his red colour, dark red nose, French accent, and shape, but he doesn't wear a hat (only in some episodes, which is rare), wears brown shoes and has three hairs on his head. His catchphrase is "I'll give you..." (depending on what episode; e.g. in the episode "Clean Teeth", he says "I'll give you unacceptable!") followed by a segment of flatulence that can be heard anywhere in Dillydale. After this, at least one character shouts "Mr. Rude!" (among the most common Mr. Men and Little Misses that do this are Mr. Grumpy, Mr. Bump, Mr. Tickle, Mr. Small, Mr. Happy, Little Miss Scary, and Little Miss Helpful; as is the case of Series 1). In both US and UK versions, he is voiced by Joey D'Auria (credited as Joseph J. Terry).

=== Mr. Rush ===
Mr. Rush
- Author: Roger Hargreaves
- Illustrator: Roger Hargreaves
- Language: English
- Series: Mr. Men
- Genre: Children's literature
- Publisher: Ladybird Books
- Publication date: 5 March 1978
- Publication place: United Kingdom
- ISBN: 978-0-7214-2257-2
- Preceded by: Mr. Quiet
- Followed by: Mr. Tall

Mr. Rush is the 30th book in the Mr. Men series by Roger Hargreaves. Mr. Rush is always in a rush. He never does anything properly. He is in such a rush he has a terrible breakfast (toast not toasted, water cold), only brushes one tooth, and runs out of the house to go nowhere. He sees an ad for a vacation in a magazine but can't go away because he has no money, so he wants a job to make money. Being a bus driver isn't good because he doesn't stop at any of the stops, and being a waiter isn't good because he'd whisk away the food as soon as he brought it. The job he finds is as a postman delivering express letters, the best job for the fastest thing on two feet. He saves enough money and goes on vacation.

Mr. Rush appears under the titles Monsieur Pressé (French), Don Prisas (Spanish), Ο Κύριος Βιαστικός (Greek), 匆忙先生 (Taiwan), 서둘러씨 (Korean), Unser Herr Eilig (German).

== S ==
=== Mr. Scatterbrain ===
Mr. Scatterbrain
- Portrayed by: Joey D'Auria (credited as Joseph J. Terry) (U.S. and UK)

Mr. Scatterbrain is a new Mr. Man created for The Mr. Men Show. He is a magenta Mr. Man with a purple outline. He also has a blue bowler hat and a wide collection of random items. He is the least intelligent out of the Mr. Men. Unlike the other Mr. Men and Little Misses, his tongue is hot pink. He also has a lot of animal friends, ranging from penguins to iguanas. He always says "Well, why didn't you say so?" (evident that he has short-term memory loss) and "Where's my head?". In both the U.S. and UK versions, his voice shifts around from high to low, very much like actor Ed Wynn. He was created as a counterpart to Little Miss Scatterbrain from the books. In the French version, he is called Monsieur Tête-en-L'air and, in the Portuguese version, he is called Senhor Distraído. He has a New York accent in both versions and is played in the US and UK Versions by Joey D'Auria (credited as Joseph J. Terry).

=== Mr. Silly ===
Mr. Silly
- Author: Roger Hargreaves
- Illustrator: Roger Hargreaves
- Language: English
- Series: Mr. Men
- Genre: Children's literature
- Publisher: Fabbri
- Publication date: 15 August 1972
- Publication place: United Kingdom
- Pages: 40 pp
- ISBN: 978-0-85396-019-5
- Preceded by: Mr. Topsy-Turvy
- Followed by: Mr. Uppity/Mr. Snooty

Mr. Silly is the 10th book in the Mr. Men series by Roger Hargreaves. Mr. Silly is a Mr. Man who lives in Nonsenseland, where the trees have red leaves and the grass is blue. Every year there is a contest for the silliest idea of the year, and Mr. Silly cannot think of one. On the way, he meets some of the animals that do human activities and say the wrong sounds. Mr. Silly wins the contest by painting all the leaves on the trees green.

In earlier printings of Mr. Men books on the back covers, Mr. Silly was cream with a red hat, but as of later printings, he is light brown with an orange hat, like on the front cover of his book and the book's pages. Mr. Silly appears under the titles Monsieur Étonnant (French), Don Tontainas (Spanish), Unser Herr Komisch (German), Ο Κύριος Ανόητος (Greek), 엉뚱씨 (Korean), Mr. Dwl (Welsh), Meneertje Malloot/Meneertje Raar (Dutch), 滑稽先生 (Taiwan), Fætter Fjolle (Danish), and Senhor Esquisito (Portuguese).

=== Mr. Skinny ===
Mr. Skinny
- Author: Roger Hargreaves
- Illustrator: Roger Hargreaves
- Language: English
- Series: Mr. Men
- Genre: Children's literature
- Publication date: 18 March 1978
- Publication place: United Kingdom
- Preceded by: Mr. Wrong
- Followed by: Mr. Mischief

Mr. Skinny is the 35th book in the Mr. Men series by Roger Hargreaves. Mr. Skinny is a Mr. Man who lives in Fatland, where everything and everyone is big except for him. He has a small appetite and sees Dr. Plump, who has him visit Mr. Greedy to help increase Mr. Skinny's appetite for a month. Mr. Skinny gains a belly. Mr. Skinny appears under the titles Monsieur Maigre (French), 苗條先生 (Taiwan), 빼빼씨 (Korean), Ο Κύριος Κοκαλιάρης (Greek), Unser Herr Dünn (German), Fætter Pind (Danish).

=== Mr. Slow ===
Mr. Slow
- Author: Roger Hargreaves
- Illustrator: Roger Hargreaves
- Language: English
- Series: Mr. Men
- Genre: Children's literature
- Publication date: 1 October 1978
- Preceded by: Mr. Busy
- Followed by: Mr. Brave

Mr. Slow is the 39th book in the Mr. Men series by Roger Hargreaves and the final usual Mr. Man created and published before Hargreaves' death. Mr. Slow does everything very slowly. It took him until New Year to open his Christmas presents, and until Easter to write his thank-yous. He tries to get a job. When he tried to be a news reporter, it took him until midnight to read the news. When he tried to be a taxi driver, he delayed Mr. Uppity in getting to the train station. The job he gets is as a steamroller driver. Mr. Slow appears under the titles Monsieur Lent (French), Don Tranquilo (Spanish), 느려씨 (Korean), 慢吞吞先生 (Taiwan), Ο Κύριος Αργοκίνητος (Greek), Fætter Langsom (Danish), Unser Herr Langsam (German).

=== Mr. Small ===
Mr. Small
- Author: Roger Hargreaves
- Illustrator: Roger Hargreaves
- Language: English
- Series: Mr. Men
- Genre: Children's literature
- Publisher: Fabbri
- Publication date: 15 August 1972
- Publication place: United Kingdom
- Pages: 40 pp
- ISBN: 978-0-85396-021-8
- Preceded by: Mr. Uppity/Mr. Snooty
- Followed by: Mr. Daydream

Mr. Small is the 12th book in the Mr. Men series by Roger Hargreaves. Mr. Small is a Mr. Man who lives under a daisy at the bottom of Mr. Robinson's garden. He eats very enormous meals, and talks to Walter the Worm about getting a job. He then meets Mr. Robinson, who tries to get him a job. They try putting mustard in mustard jars, and they try putting matches into matchboxes. Neither job goes well. It's decided the best job for somebody so small is writing children's books. Mr. Robinson introduces Mr. Small to a friend who writes children's books (referring to Roger Hargreaves) and writes a book all about himself. This Mr. Men book thus breaks the fourth wall.

In the 2008 TV series The Mr. Men Show, Mr. Small is considerably larger (about twice the size of a slice of bread) and is orange. He also wears a tall black top hat (similar to Abraham Lincoln's) instead of a blue bowler, is an egg-like shape, and wears a pair of white sneakers. Like Mr. Grumpy and Mr. Bump, his favourite food is liverwurst sandwiches. He also is able to speak in French and Spanish. He behaves in a rather cheerful, gentleman-like manner and he likes saying "Good tidings!" and "Great McGillicutty!" His best friend is Mr. Nosey, and they live together in an observatory with a large telescope coming out from the roof. They also often pilot strange machinery that they themselves use. In the US and UK Versions, he is voiced by Phil Lollar and Keith Wickham.

Mr. Small appears under the titles Monsieur Petit (French), Don Pequeño (Spanish), Unser Herr Winzig (German), Mr. Bach (Welsh), 小不點先生 (Taiwan), 작아씨 (Korean), Meneertje Klein/Meneertje Mini (Dutch), Ο Κύριος Μικρούλης (Greek), Fætter Fnug (Danish), and Senhor Pequeno (Portuguese).

=== Mr. Sneeze ===
Mr. Sneeze
- Author: Roger Hargreaves
- Illustrator: Roger Hargreaves
- Language: English
- Series: Mr. Men
- Genre: Children's literature
- Publisher: Fabbri
- Publication date: 10 August 1971
- Publication place: United Kingdom
- Pages: 40 pp
- ISBN: 978-0-85396-004-1
- Preceded by: Mr. Nosey
- Followed by: Mr. Bump

Mr. Sneeze is the 5th book in the Mr. Men series by Roger Hargreaves.

Mr. Sneeze is a Mr. Man who lives in Shivertown, the capital of Coldland, where everybody has a red nose from all the sneezing. Mr. Sneeze doesn't like sneezing all the time and makes a long journey to where there is no sneezing. He meets a wizard to which he explains the story. The wizard transports the two to Coldland, and the wizard uses his magic to warm the place up. Nobody has red noses any more, not even Mr. Sneeze.

Mr. Sneeze appears under the titles Monsieur Atchoum (French), Unser Herr Hatschi (German), Don Achus (Spanish), Senhor Espirro (Portuguese), 재채기씨 (Korean), Mr. Tisian (Welsh), Meneertje Hatsjie (Dutch), 噴嚏先生 (Taiwan), Ο Κύριος Συναχούλης (Greek), Fætter Nys (Danish), מר אפצ'י (Hebrew).

=== Mr. Snow ===
Mr. Snow
- Author: Roger Hargreaves
- Illustrator: Roger Hargreaves
- Language: English
- Series: Mr. Men
- Genre: Children's literature
- Publisher: Fabbri
- Publication date: 1 November 1971
- Publication place: United Kingdom
- Pages: 36 pp
- ISBN: 978-0-85396-008-9
- Preceded by: Mr. Bump
- Followed by: Mr. Messy

Mr. Snow is the 7th book in the Mr. Men series by Roger Hargreaves. Mr. Snow was an ordinary snowman until he was brought to life to help Father Christmas. The ending requires that the reader build a snowman properly the next time he or she builds one because Father Christmas might want that snowman's help. Mr. Snow appears under the titles Monsieur Neige (French), Don Nieve (Spanish), Ο Κύριος Χιονούλης (Greek), 눈사람씨 (Korean), Mr. Eira (Welsh), 雪人先生 (Taiwan), Unser Herr Frostig (German), Meneertje Sneeuw (Dutch).

=== Mr. Spendy ===
Mr. Spendy is a very obscure Mr. Men book. Unlike the other Mr. Men and Little Miss books, this book was made and published by somebody other than Roger Hargreaves. It was published by Kathleen Smith. As a result, it's not canon to the actual Mr. Men series.

Mr. Spendy was a friendly man who liked to spend his money, never saving for a rainy day, but his good friend Mr. Thrifty and his family soon informed him of his wasteful ways and helped him to manage his money so Mr. Spendy could go on holiday.

This book is the rarest in the series. It is the only one, apart from the post-1990s books, not created by Roger Hargreaves, nor did Adam Hargreaves write it. No other canonical Mr. Men or Little Misses appear in it. Mr. Spendy never appeared in any of the TV shows and is not part of the Mr. Men library. Mr. Spendy has five fingers, while the canon Mr. Men and Little Misses have only four. This is the only book to have £90 or £100. It is meant to be £0.01.

=== Mr. Strong ===
Mr. Strong
- Author: Roger Hargreaves
- Illustrator: Roger Hargreaves
- Language: English
- Series: Mr. Men
- Genre: Children's literature
- Publication date: 14 April 1976
- Publication place: United Kingdom
- Preceded by: Mr. Impossible
- Followed by: Mr. Grumpy

Mr. Strong is the 26th book in the Mr. Men series by Roger Hargreaves.

Mr. Strong is a Mr. Man who is so strong from eating many eggs, enough that he can break things until he finds a farmer whose cornfield is on fire. Mr. Strong is so strong he picks up the farmer's barn and fills it with water, and pours the water onto the cornfield, extinguishing it. Mr. Strong is rewarded with eggs from the chickens on the farm.

In the 2008 TV series The Mr. Men Show, Mr. Strong's shape changed from a square to an upside down triangle, however, he kept his red colour. He also wears a weight belt with a yellow buckle instead of his hat. He often says "Yo" at the beginning of his sentences and his catchphrases are "Aw, pickles!" when something goes wrong and occasionally "Good thing I came along". He is voiced by Simon Greenall in the UK version and by Phil Lollar in the US Version, in which he speaks with a New York accent.

Mr. Strong appears under the titles Monsieur Costaud (French), Don Forzudo (Spanish), Unser Herr Stark (German), Meneertje Sterk (Dutch), Ο Κύριος Δυνατός (Greek), 強壯先生 (Taiwan), 힘세씨 (Korean), Fætter Stærk (Danish), Gubben Stark (Swedish), and Senhor Forte (Portuguese).

=== Mr. Stubborn ===
Mr. Stubborn
- Portrayed by: Godfrey (credited as Godfrey Danchimah) (U.S.); Lewis MacLeod (UK)

Mr. Stubborn is a new Mr. Man created for The Mr. Men Show. He is purple and resembles Mr. Grumble, with a triangular yellow nose, a black outline, and two hairs. He often assumes others are wrong, even when it is obvious that he is wrong. If possible, he misuses items and after they break, he thinks that they are cheap (e.g. "This tent is cheap!!!" or "This door is cheap!!!"). He was created as a counterpart to Little Miss Stubborn, his sister from the books. In the French version, he is called Monsieur Têtu and, in the Portuguese version, he is called Senhor Teimoso. He is voiced by Godfrey C. Dancimah Jr. (US) and Lewis MacLeod (UK).

=== Mr. Stupid ===
Mr. Stupid
- Author: Roger Hargreaves
- Illustrator: Roger Hargreaves
- Language: English
- Genre: Children's literature
- Publication date: 1977
- Publication place: United Kingdom

Mr. Stupid was a Mr. Man created for a road safety poster. He is green, circular and seen as "dumb" by all of the characters.

== T ==
=== Mr. Tall ===
Mr. Tall
- Author: Roger Hargreaves
- Illustrator: Roger Hargreaves
- Language: English
- Series: Mr. Men
- Genre: Children's literature
- Publisher: Egmont Publishing; Fabbri
- Publication date: 1978
- Publication place: United Kingdom
- Preceded by: Mr. Rush
- Followed by: Mr. Worry

Mr. Tall is the 31st book in the Mr. Men series by Roger Hargreaves. Mr. Tall is possibly the tallest Mr. Man so far, and he hates his long and oversized legs (his problem). First, he meets Mr. Small, who was standing under a daisy, and they go for a walk together, Later, Mr. Small goes for a swim, and Mr. Tall can't, because by the time it gets deep enough for him to swim, he will be out to the other side, so he just sits. However (and much later), Mr. Tall meets three other Mr. Men (Mr. Tickle, Mr. Greedy, and Mr. Nosey) who teach him that oversized body parts can be helpful. Mr. Tall then decides his oversized legs are great for walking, and while Mr. Tall made it home quickly due to his walking, Mr. Small took a year to get home. He is now happy.

He appeared in the second season of The Mr. Men Show, voiced by Keith Wickham (UK) and Godfrey (US). However, his only speaking appearance was in the episode 'Travel'. Like Little Miss Curious, he mostly acted as a background character. Aside from keeping his looks from the books, he has a crooked brown hat at the top, that has a yellow band around it. He has got a deep voice similar to that of a soul singer. Mr. Tall speaks with a Texan accent, which is deeper than Mr. Strong's, and a Polish accent.

Mr. Tall appears under the titles Monsieur Grand (French), Don Alto (Spanish), Unser Herr Riesig (German), Meneertje Lang (Dutch), Fætter Høj (Danish), Ο Κύριος Ψηλός (Greek), Pan Tyka (Polish), 長腿先生 (Taiwan), 키다리씨 (Korean), Herra Hár (Icelandic), and Senhor Alto (Portuguese).

Mr. Tall is also a relative of Little Miss Somersault.

=== Mr. Thrifty ===
Mr. Thrifty, also known as "Mr. Thrift," is a green character who appeared in "Mr. Spendy." He is the friend of Mr. Spendy. He advises him to save up his money. He has a wife and three daughters. His wife is Little Miss Thrifty, and his three daughters are Little Miss Penny, Little Miss Polly, and Little Miss Prudence. He is the one of those Mr. Men to get married and have children. He is also the one of those Mr. Men to have freckles.

=== Mr. Tickle ===
Mr. Tickle
- Author: Roger Hargreaves
- Illustrator: Roger Hargreaves
- Language: English
- Series: Mr. Men
- Genre: Children's literature
- Publisher: Egmont Publishing; Fabbri
- Publication date: 10 August 1971
- Publication place: United Kingdom
- Pages: 40 pp
- ISBN: 978-0-85396-003-4
- Preceded by: N/A
- Followed by: Mr. Greedy

Mr. Tickle is the 1st book in the Mr. Men series by Roger Hargreaves.

The character of Mr. Tickle was created when Roger's 8-year-old son, Adam, asked, "What does a tickle look like?" (one of his most impossible questions, as said in the show 50 Years of Mr. Men). Like all Mr. Men, Mr. Tickle has a simplistic look. He is orange with long arms and a small blue hat.

In 2001, for the 30th anniversary of the Mr. Men, Mr. Tickle's book was released as a collector's edition hardback. It included a foreword from Adam Hargreaves.

Mr. Tickle's story begins with him in bed and making himself breakfast without getting up due to the length of his ‘extraordinarily long arms’. He then decides that it is a tickling sort of day and so goes around town tickling people – a teacher, a policeman, a greengrocer, a station guard, a doctor, a butcher, and a postman. The book ends with a warning that Mr. Tickle could be lurking around the reader's doorway, waiting to tickle them.

Mr. Tickle appears under the titles Monsieur Chatouille (French), Don Cosquillas (Spanish), Mr. Goglais (Welsh), Unser Herr Killekille (German), Meneertje Kietel (Dutch), Ο Κύριος Γαργαλίτσας (Greek), 搔癢先生 (Taiwan), 간지럼씨 (Korean), Fætter Kilderik (Danish), Gubben Killekill (Swedish), מר דגדוג (Hebrew), Mr. Csiki (Hungarian), Senhor Cócegas (Portuguese), and Il Signor Solletico (Italian).

In the 2008 TV series The Mr. Men Show, Mr. Tickle remains relatively the same in looks, though his hat has an aqua stripe and his arms are normally sized but can stretch out when needed. He is a resident of the ‘Dillydale’ city. However, he tickles other Mr. Men and Little Misses: this is due to the obvious absence of humans in Dillydale. As far as character traits go, he is still determined to tickle everyone he interacts with, but instead of doing it for mischief, he does it to make people happy and will stop when nobody wants him to tickle them, save for when the opportunity knocks with Mr. Grumpy, who appears to be his favourite target. He also owns a robot shop. His catchphrase is "I think somebody needs a tickle!". In the US and UK versions, he is voiced by storyboard artist, Jeff Stewart (not to be confused with the Scottish actor of the same name) and Rob Rackstraw.

Mr. Tickle is also featured in some of the other books, such as Little Miss Magic. In her story, she reduces his arms to normal length so he can no longer be annoying and tickle anyone. She eventually gives him his arms back when he begs for forgiveness and promises to reduce his actions to one tickle a day. However, he gets his revenge as soon as he is out of the room with his long arms and uses his one tickle for the day on her.

=== Mr. Topsy-Turvy ===
Mr. Topsy-Turvy
- Author: Roger Hargreaves
- Illustrator: Roger Hargreaves
- Language: English
- Series: Mr. Men
- Genre: Children's literature
- Publisher: Fabbri
- Publication date: 15 August 1972
- Publication place: United Kingdom
- Pages: 40 pp
- ISBN: 978-0-85396-017-1
- Preceded by: Mr. Messy
- Followed by: Mr. Silly

Mr. Topsy-Turvy is the 9th book in the Mr. Men series by Roger Hargreaves. Mr. Topsy-Turvy does everything the wrong way. One day he comes to the town where the reader lives. He rents a room in a hotel, speaking to the hotel manager the wrong way, "Afternoon good, I'd room a like." The next day, he confuses the taxi driver with his backwards speaking, causing an accident, buying a pair of socks and putting them on his hands, then he disappears, but everything is still topsy-turvy. Everybody still speaks topsy-turvy, and the reader is asked to say something topsy-turvy.

Mr. Topsy-Turvy originated from a competition run by Roger Hargreaves to find a new Mr Men character and was an idea by Marc Penfold who created Mr. Upside Down and a story in which the character lived in a backwards world. The idea did not win the competition but Roger Hargreaves liked the idea so much he wrote to Marc Penfold saying he would use the idea and thus Mr. Topsy-Turvy was born.

Mr. Topsy-Turvy appears under the titles Monsieur A L'Envers (French), Don Alreves (Spanish), Unser Herr Kuddelmuddel (German), 顛倒先生 (Taiwan), 거꿀씨 (Korean), Mr. Popeth-o-Chwith (Welsh), Meneertje Opsekop/Meneertje Andersom (Dutch), Ο Κύριος Ανάποδος (Greek), Fætter Omvendt (Danish), Il Signor Sottosopra (Italian).

=== Mr. Try ===
Mr. Try is the mascot for the Uniqlo 2016 T-Shirts sales.

== U ==
=== Mr. Uppity ===
Mr. Uppity
- Author: Roger Hargreaves
- Illustrator: Roger Hargreaves
- Language: English
- Series: Mr. Men
- Genre: Children's literature
- Publisher: Fabbri
- Publication date: 15 August 1972
- Publication place: United Kingdom
- Pages: 40 pp
- ISBN: 978-0-85396-020-1
- Preceded by: Mr. Silly
- Followed by: Mr. Small

Mr. Uppity is the 11th book in the Mr. Men series by Roger Hargreaves. Mr. Uppity lives in Bigtown and he is very rich. He is rude to everybody (who call him Miserable old Uppity) until one day he meets a goblin. When he is rude to the goblin, the goblin shrinks Mr. Uppity so he can fit into a hole in a tree, and they enter the tree to meet the King of the Goblins. The goblin agrees to shrink Mr. Uppity if he is rude to somebody. This happens until Mr. Uppity is nice. In the end, he's still rich, but now he's very popular. He most frequently uses the words, "Please" and "Thank you." At the end of the book, Hargreaves tells the readers: "Thank you for reading this story, and if you're ever thinking about being rude to somebody, please keep a sharp lookout for goblins."

Mr. Uppity appears under the titles Monsieur Malpoli (French), Don Señorito (Spanish), Mr. Ffroenuchel (Welsh), Unser Herr Hochnase (German), 傲慢先生 (Taiwan), 거만씨 (Korean), Ο Κύριος Ακατάδεχτος (Greek), Meneertje Onbeleefd (Dutch), Senhor Malcriado (Portuguese), Fætter Storsnude (Danish).

In 2021, his name changed to Mr. Snooty. His original name can be found in several other places. He is only purple in "Mr. Perfect."

== W ==
=== Mr. Walk ===
Mr. Walk is one of four characters created for the "A Walk in Fashion" collab created by Michael Lau. Mr. Walk is the face character of the Fashion Walk campaign alongside Little Miss Fashion, forming "Fashion Walk" together.

Michael Lau's other creations are his brand character Mr. GUMGUMGUM and his self-insert Mr. ML.

Mr. Walk has a loud semi-asymmetrical design with mix-match attire. His round-corner brick body is shaped like the letter "F" for Fashion. His left side can be interpreted in two different ways: he just happens to have a strangely shaped left cheek for that asymmetrical look, and as his mouth ends on the corner of his face, it might be a "Cheated Angle" in which his left side shows a protruding nose and chin.

Mr. Walk's main body colour is a shade of blue, his right side has stripes (purple on the body, orange on the arm), and his left side has polka dots (orange on the body, purple on the arm). His hat covers his entire scalp (similar to Mr. Muddle) and is half a brown Buffalo hat and red cap with a singular turquoise zigzag pattern. He wears two different shoes: his right leg has a green oxford shoe and his left leg has a white sports shoe, with a pulled-up pink sock.

On his left arm, Mr. Walk wears a glimmering golden watch. Michael Lau gave him this likely due to his beliefs in how Fashion Trends work in Hong Kong, as well as the whole Hong Kong mindset.

=== Mr. Worry ===
Mr. Worry
- Author: Roger Hargreaves
- Illustrator: Roger Hargreaves
- Language: English
- Series: Mr. Men
- Genre: Children's literature
- Publication date: 5 March 1978
- Publication place: United Kingdom
- Preceded by: Mr. Tall
- Followed by: Mr. Nonsense

Mr. Worry is the 32nd book in the Mr. Men series by Roger Hargreaves. Mr. Worry worries about everything. If it rains, he worries that his roof will leak, and if there is no rain, he worries that all of his plants will die. If he was going to the shop, he worries that the shops will be shut when he gets there, and if the shops weren't shut, he worries that he would have spent too much money. If he gets home from the shops, he worries that he may have left something behind, or one of his things had fallen out of his basket. If none of those things would happen, he worries that he would have bought too much stuff. After that, he worries about where to put them all. He worries about the other Mr. Men, and he meets a wizard who suggests he make a list of all his worries and the wizard will make sure none of them happen. When there is nothing to worry about, Mr. Worry was then happy for a week until Monday, when he was worried about having nothing to worry about.

Mr. Worry appears under the titles Monsieur Inquiet (French), Don Preocupado (Spanish), Ο Κύριος Ανήσυχος (Greek), 걱정씨 (Korean), 煩惱先生 (Taiwan), Unser Herr Sorgenvoll (German).

=== Mr. Wrong ===
Mr. Wrong
- Author: Roger Hargreaves
- Illustrator: Roger Hargreaves
- Language: English
- Series: Mr. Men
- Genre: Children's literature
- Publisher: Ladybird Books
- Publication date: 18 March 1978
- Publication place: United Kingdom
- ISBN: 978-0-7214-2255-8
- Preceded by: Mr. Nonsense
- Followed by: Mr. Skinny

Mr. Wrong is the 34th book in the Mr. Men series by Roger Hargreaves. Mr. Wrong does everything wrong, always tending to do everything in his life the wrong way and even walks the wrong way. One day, he meets Mr. Right who looks like him but does everything right. Mr. Right tries to teach him how to be right, but everything goes wrong. Mr. Wrong appears under the titles Monsieur Farfelu (French), 틀려씨 (Korean), 糟糕先生 (Taiwan), O Κύριος Λάθος (Greek), Unser Herr Falsch (German), Fætter Forkert (Danish).

== See also ==
- Mr. Men
- List of Little Miss characters
- Roger Hargreaves
- Adam Hargreaves
- The Mr. Men Show
- The Mr. Men Show (1997 TV series)
- Mr. Men and Little Miss
- Mr. Tickle
- Mr. Tall
- List of The Mr. Men Show episodes
