= Keith Scott (voice actor) =

Australian voice actor and comedian

- Born: Sydney, New South Wales, Australia
- Occupations: Voice actor; comedian; impressionist; animation historian
- Years active: 1969-present
- Spouse: Sue Scott
- Children: 7
- Website: www.keithscott.com.au

Keith Scott is an Australian voice actor, comedian, impressionist, and animation historian, best known as the official voice of Bullwinkle J. Moose since 1992 and in the 2000 film The Adventures of Rocky and Bullwinkle, the narrator in both the 1997 film George of the Jungle and its 2003 sequel George of the Jungle 2 and the official licensed voice of the Hanna-Barbera and Looney Tunes characters in Australian commercials and theme park attractions. He also provided voices for Australian animated films and television series by Yoram Gross Film Studios, including the Dot films, The Magic Riddle, Blinky Bill, Tabaluga, Skippy: Adventures in Bushtown and Flipper & Lopaka, and starred on the radio program How Green Was My Cactus.

In addition to voice acting, Scott authored two books, The Moose That Roared: The Story of Jay Ward, Bill Scott, a Flying Squirrel, and a Talking Moose and Cartoon Voices of the Golden Age, Vol. 1-2 and has also studied the work of early, uncredited voice actors in cartoons.

== Career ==
At a young age, Scott was always enchanted by the mimics and impressionists on The Ed Sullivan Show. He began developing his ability to impersonate voices at The Forest High School, doing cartoon characters (the first of which being Mr. Jinks) and teacher's voices. In October 1972, just after leaving school at age 18-- and as a 19th birthday present-- Scott got the gig of being hired as a xerographer by William Hanna, the head of Hanna-Barbera, which established a large animation studio in Sydney, less than two years after bringing in some letters that he received from Daws Butler (voice of characters such as Yogi Bear, Huckleberry Hound, etc.). Hanna gave him a letter of recommendation when he was retrenched from the Hanna-Barbera office and his name was such a credible one that it got Scott an instant agent and his voice-over career began. In 1974, Scott began doing either impersonations or original character voices in many anonymous radio and television commercials and was promoted at Sydney clubs as "the Voice of 1000 Commercials." He was also approved by Hanna-Barbera to do the voices of Fred Flintstone, Yogi Bear and others for Australian commercials and later live shows at Wonderland Sydney (known at the time as Australia's Wonderland) for 15 years.

Scott also performed live stand-up comedy. Music producer Gene Pierson arranged for live recordings of comedy acts at the Comedy Store in Sydney. The first video to be produced was titled Australia Laughs, released on video by Video Classics in 1984, featuring Scott, George Smilovitch, Rodney Rude, Vince Sorrenti, Garry Who, Calvin de Grey, and Graham Pugh. He also made many appearances on television shows as a comic impressionist, including Hey Hey It's Saturday and The Midday Show. In 1984, Scott began working for Yoram Gross Film Studios, usually providing most or all of the male character voices for their various productions, including the Dot feature films, The Magic Riddle, Blinky Bill (he also sang the original version of the theme song for the first season), Tabaluga, Skippy: Adventures in Bushtown and Flipper & Lopaka. In 1986, he starred on the radio program How Green Was My Cactus, alongside his Yoram Gross co-star Robyn Moore, skewering the reputations of media and political figures.

Scott became internationally famous for his expert "matching" of cartoon characters. Between November 1989 and July 1990, he was appointed an official licensed voice of Warner Bros.' Looney Tunes characters for Australia following the death of legendary actor Mel Blanc on 10 July and since then, he did Bugs Bunny, Daffy Duck, Tweety, Sylvester the Cat and the rest for countless animated television commercials, live shows and promotions for Warner Bros. Movie World, Westfield, KFC, etc. (Note: Attributed to multiple references:) Scott had narrated a television promotion for The Looney Looney Looney Bugs Bunny Movie in 1983 and met Blanc himself in May 1985, taping some impersonations for the Triple M network and trading blows with their voice impressions; he did Elmer Fudd and Jack Benny, while Blanc did Bugs Bunny and Sy the Mexican.

Scott was a long-time friend of Bill Scott (no relation) and Jay Ward, the latter of whom Scott met in 1973 while working as a xerographer at Hanna-Barbera. After Ward died in 1989, his daughter, Tiffany, took over Jay Ward Productions in 1991 and began revitalizing The Adventures of Rocky and Bullwinkle and Friends characters. At that time, Scott had made a tape of all the imitations of Bullwinkle J. Moose, Boris Badenov, Dudley Do-Right and a lot of the supporting characters in March. Tiffany got a copy of the tape from June Foray (voice of Rocky the Flying Squirrel) and, upon hearing the tape, realized that Scott had studied it for years, so she and Ward's wife, Ramona, appointed him the official voices in 1992. Scott performed the voice of the narrator in both the 1997 film George of the Jungle and its 2003 sequel George of the Jungle 2 and provided the voices for Bullwinkle, Boris, Fearless Leader, The Narrator and the RBTV Announcer in the 2000 motion picture The Adventures of Rocky and Bullwinkle (for which he had been specially flown to the United States several times). He is an expert on the history of Jay Ward Productions, authoring the book The Moose That Roared: The Story of Jay Ward, Bill Scott, a Flying Squirrel, and a Talking Moose, published by St. Martin's Press. Also in 1999, Scott was originally cast as the voices of Both Gordon The Big Engine and Diesel 10 in Thomas and the Magic Railroad but was replaced in the final film with Neil Crone.

Scott has also spent years studying the work of early voice actors, trying to identify performers who originally went uncredited in cartoons and authoring the 2022 book Cartoon Voices of the Golden Age, Vol. 1-2, published by BearManor Media.

== Filmography ==
=== Film ===
List of voice-acting credits in film
Year	Title	Role	Notes
1984	Epic	Special vocal effects	Theatrical film
1985	Dot and the Koala	Bruce, Mayor Percy, Sherlock Bones, Watson and various	Theatrical film
1986	Dot and Keeto	Keeto, Butterwalk, Atlantis, Grasshopper and various	Theatrical film
1986	Dot and the Whale	Nelson, Owen and Moby Dick	Theatrical film
1987	Dot and the Smugglers	Bruce the Koala, Burra, Bruiser, Basher, Bunyip, Mr. Sprag, Scarface, Fat Boy from Wilyabrup and various	Theatrical film
1987	Frenchman's Farm	Radio Announcer	Theatrical film
1987	The Adventures of Candy Claus	Santa Claus, Head Elf, Elves, Mustknow Computer, Professor Mustknow, Oh No, Lou and Sam	Television movie
1987	Dot Goes to Hollywood	Gumley, Grumblebones, Laurel and Hardy and various	Theatrical film
1988	Black Tulip		Theatrical film
1988	Hiawatha		Television movie
1988	Peter Pan	Mr. Smee	Theatrical film
1988	Alice in Wonderland	White Rabbit, March Hare, Dodo and Card Painter	Theatrical film
1988	Around the World in 80 Days	Bank Robber, Reform Club Member 1, French Dog 3, British Consul Dog, Egyptian Villagers, Superintendent, Calcutta Jailer, Train Driver and Carriage Driver	Theatrical film
1991	The Magic Riddle	Philippe, Widow (Wolf Disguise), Pinocchio, Seven Dwarves and various	Theatrical film
1992	Blinky Bill: The Mischievous Koala	Splodge the Kangaroo, Flap the Platypus, Mr Wombat (Wombo), Mayor Pelican, Mr Emu, Jacko, Harry and Joe	Theatrical film
1994	Dot in Space	Grumblebones, Buster, Papa Drop, Roly, Professor Globus, Inflato, Sergeant, Soldiers and various	Theatrical film
1997	Go to Hell!!	Various	Theatrical film
1997	George of the Jungle	Narrator	Theatrical film
1997	Paws	Computer	Theatrical film
1997	Joey	Additional voices	Theatrical film
2000	The Adventures of Rocky and Bullwinkle	Bullwinkle J. Moose, Animated Boris Badenov, Animated Fearless Leader, The Narrator and RBTV Announcer	Theatrical film
2000	The Magic Pudding	Additional voices	Theatrical film
2003	Subterano	Puppeteer (voice)	Theatrical film
2003	George of the Jungle 2	Narrator	Direct-to-video
2005	Blinky Bill's White Christmas	Flap the Platypus, Splodge the Kangaroo, Wombo, Mayor Pelican and various	Television movie
2007	Gumnutz: A Juicy Tale	Uncle Kelvin, Ghoulie Gilly, Grampala and additional voices	Television movie
2008	Australia	Newsreel Announcers	Theatrical film
2009	Daybreakers	Additional voices	Theatrical film

=== Television ===
List of voice-acting credits in television
Year	Title	Role
1959–1961	The Adventures of Rocky and Bullwinkle and Friends	The Narrator (opening intro and bumpers in 2003-2005, 2010-2011 home releases)
1975–1976	Kum-Kum	Little Rock, The Wise One, Roman, Additional Voices (1977 English dub)
1983–1989	Perfect Match	Announcer (1983–84), Dexter the Robot
1988–1989	Bright Sparks	Sparky
1992–1995	Lift Off	Additional Voices (animated segments)
1993–2004	The Adventures of Blinky Bill	Flap the Platypus, Splodge the Kangaroo, Wombo, Mr. Koala, Mayor Pelican, Danny Dingo, Meatball Dingo, Shifty Dingo, Various Voices
1996–1998	Big Bag	Samuel, Sergeant, Citizens, Firefighter, Bank Robber, Police Officer, Prison Guard, Narrator (It's Samuel! pilot), Various Voices (Samuel and Nina segments in Season 1)
1997–2003	Tabaluga	Arktos, Shouhu, Tyrion, Ruby, James, Vultur, Attila the Walrus, Various Voices
1998	Skippy: Adventures in Bushtown	Mayor Croco, Professor Angus McPouch, Brusier, Sirlion, Damon, Rowdy, Honest L. Slick, Pos, Major Winston Gelles, Rocky Star, Various Voices
1999–2005	Flipper & Lopaka	Flipper, Ottie, Ray, Puffy, Dexter, Serge, Sharks, Various Voices
2000	2000 Kids' Choice Awards	Bullwinkle J. Moose
2001–2002	Fairy Tale Police Department	Various Voices
2002	Old Tom	Old Tom, Various Voices
2006–2007	Staines Down Drains	Vegety Bill, Blobert, Bratwurst, Twinky Lupe, Various Voices
2009–2010	Dennis the Menace and Gnasher	Curly Sr., Mr. Pie Face, Wilbur Carter Brown, Colonel, Sergeant Slipper, Mr. Har Har, Mr. De Testa, Additional Voices
2009–2010	Legend of Enyo	Quag Naga
2009–2013	Sally Bollywood: Super Detective	Harry Bollywood, Additional Voices
2013	Ghosts of Time	Theo, Additional Voices
2018–present	Nate Is Late	Dwayne, Jumbo, Ogre
2021	Tales of Aluna	Johnny Tuff, Barabajagal, Mellow Yellow, Shark, Additional Voices
2023	2023 Australian Open	Bugs Bunny, Daffy Duck, Porky Pig, Tweety

=== Shorts ===
List of voice-acting credits in shorts
Year	Title	Role
1999	Fractured Fairy Tales: The Phox, the Box & the Lox	Phreddie J. Phox and Desmond Dullwit
2005	The Adventures of Roman Pilgrim	The Voices
2008	The Adventures of Rocky and Bullwinkle and Friends	Bullwinkle J. Moose, Boris Badenov, The Narrator and Boris Badenov Campaign Narrator
2008	The Banana Splits	Fleegle, Bingo and Announcer

=== Video games ===
List of voice-acting credits in video games
Year	Title	Role
1997	Blinky Bill's Ghost Cave	Flap the Platypus, Splodge the Kangaroo, Wombo Wombat, Danny Dingo, Mr. Rabbit and Ear
1997	Blinky Bill's Extraordinary Balloon Adventure	Flap the Platypus, Splodge the Kangaroo, Wombo Wombat, Kevin the Kiwi, Benny the Beaver and The Reindeer
1998	Rocky & Bullwinkle's Know-It-All Quiz Game	Bullwinkle J. Moose, Boris Badenov, Fearless Leader, Captain Peachfuzz, Dudley Do-Right, Inspector Fenwick and Aesop
2000	The Three Worlds of Flipper and Lopaka	Flipper, Dexter, Goat Fish, Garden Eel, Textile Cone, Blue Fish and Narrator
2012	The Flintstones Gaming Machine	Fred Flintstone and Barney Rubble

=== Theme park attractions ===
List of voice-acting credits in theme parks
Year	Title	Roles	Notes
1991	The Simpsons: Live on Stage	Homer Simpson	Dreamworld live show, part of a promotion of the Australian premiere of The Simpsons on Network Ten
1991	Bugs Bunny Demonstration Animatronic	Bugs Bunny	Designed by Greg McKee, Matt Ward, John Cox and Chris Chitty in just a few weeks for Warner Bros. Movie World in 1989
1991	Looney Tunes Musical Revue	Bugs Bunny, Daffy Duck, Yosemite Sam, Tweety, Sylvester the Cat, Tasmanian Devil and Foghorn Leghorn	Warner Bros. Movie World live show
1992	Spectacular Light and Sound Show Illuminanza	All the characters (Bugs Bunny, Daffy Duck, Yosemite Sam, Tweety, Sylvester the Cat, Tasmanian Devil, Foghorn Leghorn, Wile E. Coyote and Pepé Le Pew)	Warner Bros. Movie World live show, celebration of the park's first birthday
1992	The Adventures of Rocky and Bullwinkle Show	Bullwinkle J. Moose, Boris Badenov and Dudley Do-Right	Universal Studios Florida live show
1997	Pirates of the Caribbean	Pirate	Disneyland ride
1997	Hanna-Barbera Gala Celebrity Nite	Fred Flintstone, Barney Rubble, Yogi Bear, Scooby-Doo, George Jetson and Huckleberry Hound	Wonderland Sydney live show
1999	Looney Tunes: What's Up, Rock?	Tweety	Six Flags Great Adventure live show
1999	Dudley Do-Right's Ripsaw Falls	Dudley Do-Right and Inspector Fenwick	Universal's Islands of Adventure ride
1999	Popeye and Bluto's Bilge-Rat Barges	Popeye and Bluto	Universal's Islands of Adventure ride
1999	Pandemonium Cartoon Circus	Popeye, Bluto, Bullwinkle J. Moose, Boris Badenov and Dudley Do-Right	Universal's Islands of Adventure live show
2000	The Adventures of Rocky and Bullwinkle Show 2	Bullwinkle J. Moose and Boris Badenov	Universal Studios Florida live show
2004	Looney Tunes: We Got the Beat!	Bugs Bunny, Daffy Duck, Tweety, Sylvester, Taz, and Foghorn Leghorn	Six Flags live show, re-recorded track by Scott
2008	Looney Tunes: What's Up Rock?!	Bugs Bunny, Daffy Duck, Porky Pig, Tweety, Sylvester the Cat, Marvin the Martian, Tasmanian Devil and Foghorn Leghorn	Warner Bros. Movie World live show
2010	Looney Tunes on Ice	Bugs Bunny, Daffy Duck, Tweety and Sylvester the Cat	Warner Bros. Movie World ice show
2011	Looney Tunes LIVE! Classroom Capers	Bugs Bunny, Daffy Duck, Porky Pig, Tweety, Sylvester the Cat, Marvin the Martian and Tasmanian Devil	Touring live show
2011	Christmas Moments with Looney Tunes	Bugs Bunny, Tweety and Sylvester the Cat	Live show
2013	Looney Tunes Christmas Carols	Bugs Bunny, Daffy Duck, Tweety, Marvin the Martian and Tasmanian Devil	Carols by Candlelight live show

=== Commercials ===
List of voice-acting credits in television commercials
Year	Title	Role	Notes
1972	Hanna-Barbera Sydney Promotion	Second Announcer	Promotional film for Hanna-Barbera Pty. Ltd.
1976	Fruity Pebbles Commercials	Fred Flintstone and Barney Rubble	Fruity Pebbles commercials, animation by Hanna-Barbera Pty. Ltd.
1976	Yogi Shake Commercial	Yogi Bear	Yogi Shake commercial, animation by Hanna-Barbera Pty. Ltd.
1979	Welcome SuperChook	SuperChook	KFC commercial
1980	The Blob	Blob, Boy and Narrator	Streets commercial
1981	Pauls Scooby-Doo Ice Cream	Scooby-Doo, Shaggy Rogers, Fred Jones and Chocolate-Chomping Vanilla Gorilla	Pauls commercial, animation by Hanna-Barbera Pty. Ltd.
1981	Streets Doctor Who Ice Cream	Fourth Doctor, K9 and Meglos	Streets commercial
1981	Pauls Buck Rogers Star Stick	Buck Rogers, Twiki and Narrator	Pauls commercial
1981	Pizza Hut Martians	Martian and Narrator	Pizza Hut commercial
1982	Streets Mr. Men and Doctor Who Ice Cream	Narrator	Streets commercial
1982	Pauls Pac-Man Ice Cream	Narrator	Pauls commercial
1982	Stay Alive Commercial	Count Dracula and Vincent Price	Stay Alive commercial
1982	Fridge a Kit Kat	Kool Kat	Kit Kat commercial
1982	Popeye Commercial	Popeye (voice)	Popeye commercial
1983	Pauls Yogi Fruits	Yogi Bear and Boo-Boo Bear	Pauls commercial
1983	Demon Attack Commercial	Vincent Price	Demon Attack commercial
1983	Australian Museum Commercial	Singer and Narrator	Australian Museum commercial
1983	Streets Mr. Men Ice Treats	Mr. Nonsense, Mr. Funny, Mr. Mischief, Mr. Bump, Mr. Noisy, Mr. Greedy and Narrator	Streets commercial
1983	The Looney Looney Looney Bugs Bunny Movie	Narrator	Television promotion
1985	Masters of the Universe Ice Cream	He-Man and Skeletor	Streets commercial
1985	Peters Transformers Ice Cream	Autobot and Narrator	Peters Ice Cream commercial
1985	Hello Mudda, Hello Fadda	Boy (voice)	Yoplait commercial
1985	Marley Commercial	Jack the Duck	Marley commercial
1986	Surfing	Chester Cheetah	Cheetos commercial
1987	Pascall Disney Jellies	Mickey Mouse, Donald Duck and Goofy	Pascall commercial
1987	Garfield Phone	Garfield	Tyco commercial
1987	Inspector Gadget Fun Pack	Inspector Gadget and Brain	KFC commercial
1987	Pauls Pink Panther	Inspector Clouseau	Pauls commercial
1987	$100 000 Kit Kat Competition	Kool Kat	Kit Kat commercial
1988	Chickadees Chicken Chips	Chickadee Chicken	Chickadees commercial
1988	The Go Go Gadget Deal	Inspector Gadget, Pirate and Vikings	KFC commercial
1989	Amber Tiles Commercial	Fred Flintstone	Amber Tiles commercial, animation by Cinemagic Animated Films, music by Bob Davies
1989	Lethal Weapon 2 and Batman	Narrator	Television promotion
1989	190 Promotions	Rhett Butler, Humphrey Bogart, Jimmy Durante, Dirty Harry, Porky Pig, Fred Flintstone, Barney Rubble, Mr. Jinks, Bullwinkle J. Moose, Boris Badenov, Mr. Magoo, various voices	Seven Network promotions
1990	Bugs Bunny's 50th Birthday	Bugs Bunny	Song bumper on Porky Pig (1990 VHS)
1990	KFC Looney Tunes Cars	Bugs Bunny and Daffy Duck	KFC commercial, animated by Peter Luschwitz at Flix Animation
1990	KFC Looney Tunes Cars 2	Daffy Duck	KFC commercial, animated by Peter Luschwitz at Flix Animation
1990	Bugs Bunny's 50th Birthday Special	Bugs Bunny	Nine Network promotion
1990	Car Toons	Bugs Bunny and Daffy Duck	Shell commercial, animated by Peter Luschwitz at Flix Animation
1990	Wilde About DuckTales	Donald Duck	McDonald's commercial
1990	Teenage Mutant Ninja Turtles Rad Badges	Leonardo, Raphael, Donatello, Michelangelo and Splinter	Pizza Hut commercial
1990	It's a Buzz	Raphael	Timezone commercial
1990	Star Car Spectacular	Bugs Bunny	Westfield commercial, animated by Peter Luschwitz at Flix Animation
1990	Kold Snap	Kool Kat	Kit Kat commercial
1991	Mirinda Drinker	Bugs Bunny and Daffy Duck	Mirinda commercial, animated by Peter Luschwitz at Flix Animation
1991	Buried Treasure	Bugs Bunny and Yosemite Sam	Mirinda commercial, animated by Peter Luschwitz at Flix Animation
1991	Peters Donald Duck Ice Cream	Donald Duck	Peters Ice Cream commercial
1991	Buttercup Crumpets and Muffins	Buster Bunny	Buttercup commercial
1991	Rollerblades	Tony the Tiger	Frosted Flakes commercial
1991	Buttercup Muffins	Buster Bunny	Buttercup commercial
1991	Amber Tiles Commercial 2	Fred Flintstone	Amber Tiles commercial, animation by Cinemagic Animated Films, music by Bob Davies
1991	KFC Looney Tunes Glasses	Bugs Bunny and Daffy Duck	KFC commercial, animated by Peter Luschwitz at Flix Animation
1991	McCain Looney Tunes Meals	Bugs Bunny	McCain commercial, animated by Peter Luschwitz at Flix Animation
1991	HBF Insurance Bugs Bunny and Daffy Duck Commercial 1	Bugs Bunny and Daffy Duck	HBF Insurance commercial, animated by Peter Luschwitz at Flix Animation
1991	HBF Insurance Bugs Bunny and Daffy Duck Commercial 2	Bugs Bunny and Daffy Duck	HBF Insurance commercial, animated by Peter Luschwitz at Flix Animation
1991	Foodtown Bugs Bunny Commercial	Bugs Bunny and Elmer Fudd	Foodtown commercial, animated by Peter Luschwitz at Flix Animation
1991	Cars of the World	Fred Flintstone	Shell commercial
1991	Singin' in the Rain	Jack the Duck	Marley commercial
1991	Beach	Chester Cheetah	Cheetos commercial
1991	Little Buddy	Kool Kat	Kit Kat commercial
1991	Prime Television Promotion	Raphael	Prime Television promotion
1991	Looney Tunes Poster Calendar, Stickers, Photo Frame and Loonar Sticks	Bugs Bunny, Daffy Duck, Tweety, Sylvester the Cat and Santa Claus (voice)	Westfield commercial, animated by Peter Luschwitz at Flix Animation
1991	Warner Bros. Movie World Commercial	Narrator	Warner Bros. Movie World commercial
1992	Warner Bros. Movie World Commercial 2	Daffy Duck	Warner Bros. Movie World commercial, Daffy animated by Peter Luschwitz at Flix Animation
1992	Warner Bros. Movie World Commercial 3	Daffy Duck	Warner Bros. Movie World commercial, Daffy animated by Peter Luschwitz at Flix Animation
1992	Mirinda Pineapple Flavour	Bugs Bunny and Yosemite Sam	Mirinda commercial, animated by Peter Luschwitz at Flix Animation
1992	HBF Insurance Tweety and Sylvester Commercial	Tweety	HBF Insurance commercial, animated by Peter Luschwitz at Flix Animation
1992	Fruity and Jaffa Pebbles	Fred Flintstone, Barney Rubble and Dino	Green's commercial
1992	The Flintstones Kids' Cocktails and Dino Racers	Fred Flintstone	Cobb & Co. commercial
1992	Toyota Family Wagons	George Jetson and Mr. Spacely	Toyota commercial
1992	Volleyball	Tony the Tiger	Frosted Flakes commercial, redub of commercial from 1986
1992	Robin Hood	Dig'em Frog	Honey Smacks commercial, redub of commercial from 1990-1991
1992	Taco Bell Rocky and Bullwinkle Commercials	Bullwinkle J. Moose and Boris Badenov	Taco Bell commercials
1992	Target Bargains	Boris Badenov	Target commercial
1992	Pizza Hut Blinky Bill Commercial	Flap the Platypus and Splodge the Kangaroo	Pizza Hut commercial
1992	The Flintstones: The Rescue of Dino & Hoppy Commercial	Fred Flintstone	The Flintstones: The Rescue of Dino & Hoppy commercial
1992	Cwazy 1992 Clearance	Elmer Fudd and Daffy Duck	Toyota commercial, animated by Peter Luschwitz at Flix Animation
1992	Cwazy 1992 Clearance 2	Elmer Fudd, Foghorn Leghorn and Daffy Duck	Toyota commercial, animated by Peter Luschwitz at Flix Animation
1992	Cwazy 1992 Clearance 3	Elmer Fudd, Foghorn Leghorn and Daffy Duck	Toyota commercial, animated by Peter Luschwitz at Flix Animation
1992	Cwazy 1992 Clearance 4	Elmer Fudd and Foghorn Leghorn	Toyota commercial, animated by Peter Luschwitz at Flix Animation
1992	Cwazy 1992 Clearance 5	Elmer Fudd and Daffy Duck	Toyota commercial, animated by Peter Luschwitz at Flix Animation
1993	Looney Tunes Colourgrams	Bugs Bunny	Nutella commercial, animated by Peter Luschwitz at Flix Animation
1993	Looney Tunes Glasses	Bugs Bunny and Tasmanian Devil	Nutella commercial, animated by Peter Luschwitz at Flix Animation
1993	World of Illusion Commercial	Mickey Mouse, Donald Duck and Narrator	World of Illusion commercial
1993	KFC Looney Tunes Mugs	Himself, Tweety and Sylvester the Cat	KFC commercial
1993	KFC Looney Tunes Mugs 2	Himself, Bugs Bunny and Sylvester the Cat	KFC commercial
1993	KFC Looney Tunes Mugs 3	Himself, Bugs Bunny, Daffy Duck, Tweety and Sylvester the Cat	KFC commercial
1993	Golden Eggs Foghorn Leghorn Commercial	Foghorn Leghorn and Henery Hawk	Golden Eggs commercial, animated by Peter Luschwitz at Flix Animation
1993	Mirinda Factory	Bugs Bunny and Daffy Duck	Mirinda commercial, animated by Peter Luschwitz at Flix Animation
1993	Fruity and Choconilla Pebbles	Fred Flintstone	Green's commercial
1994	Green's Looney Tunes Chocolate Rings	Tweety and Sylvester the Cat	Green's commercial, animated by Peter Luschwitz at Flix Animation
1994	KFC Looney Tunes Mugs 4	Foghorn Leghorn and Tasmanian Devil	KFC commercial, animated by Peter Luschwitz at Flix Animation
1994	Lane Corn Snacks	Jose and Manuel	Lanes commercial, animated by Peter Luschwitz at Flix Animation
1994	Amber Tiles Commercial 3	Fred Flintstone and Barney Rubble	Amber Tiles commercial, animation by Cinemagic Animated Films, music by Bob Davies
1994	Amber Tiles Commercial 4	Fred Flintstone and Barney Rubble	Amber Tiles commercial, animation by Cinemagic Animated Films, music by Bob Davies
1994	Amber Tiles Commercial 5	Fred Flintstone	Amber Tiles commercial, animation by Cinemagic Animated Films, music by Bob Davies
1994	It's Showtime at Westfield	Bugs Bunny, Daffy Duck, Director and Narrator	Westfield commercial, animated by Peter Luschwitz at Flix Animation
1994	Mid-Week Lotto Commercial	Gentleman, Troll, Cannibal, Mermaid, Jack, Jester and Plant Man	Lotto commercial
1995	Sonic the Hedgehog Milk Ice with Shock Rocks	Dr. Robotnik and Narrator	Toppa commercial
1995	Energizer Boris and Natasha Commercial	Boris Badenov	Energizer commercial
1995	Energizer Boris and Natasha Commercial 2	Boris Badenov	Energizer commercial
1995	Qantas Warner Bros. Movie World Commercial	Bugs Bunny	Qantas commercial, animated by Peter Luschwitz at Flix Animation
1995	Canon Personal Squirt	Speedy Gonzales and Baby Mice	Canon commercial, animated by Peter Luschwitz at Flix Animation
1995	Canon Personal Squirt and Bubble Jet Printer	Speedy Gonzales	Canon commercial, animated by Peter Luschwitz at Flix Animation
1995	Canon Say-It-All Squirt	Speedy Gonzales	Canon commercial, animated by Peter Luschwitz at Flix Animation
1995	Canon Runaround Squirts	Speedy Gonzales and Daffy Duck	Canon commercial, animated by Peter Luschwitz at Flix Animation
1995	HardieDux Daffy Duck Commercial	Daffy Duck	HardieDux commercial, animated by Peter Luschwitz at Flix Animation
1995	HardieDux Water Heaters	Daffy Duck	HardieDux commercial, animated by Peter Luschwitz at Flix Animation
1995	Soyaking Commercial	King	Soyaking commercial
1996	Tazos Looney Tunes Commercial	Bugs Bunny, Daffy Duck, Porky Pig, Yosemite Sam, Sylvester the Cat, Marvin the Martian and Narrator	Tazos commercial, animated in Hong Kong
1996	Looney Tunes Steins	Tweety, Sylvester the Cat, Daffy Duck and Yosemite Sam	KFC commercial, animated in Hong Kong
1996	Sylvester and Tweety Stein	Tweety and Sylvester the Cat	KFC commercial, animated in Hong Kong
1996	Daffy Duck Stein	Tweety, Sylvester the Cat and Daffy Duck	KFC commercial, animated in Hong Kong
1996	Wile E. Coyote Stein	Tweety and Sylvester the Cat	KFC commercial, animated in Hong Kong
1996	Yosemite Sam Stein	Tweety, Sylvester the Cat and Yosemite Sam	KFC commercial, animated in Hong Kong
1996	It's Showtime at Westfield 2	Bugs Bunny, Daffy Duck and Marvin the Martian	Westfield commercial, animated in Hong Kong
1996	Kraft Shake 'n Bake Commercial	Foghorn Leghorn and Henery Hawk	Kraft Foods commercial, animated in Hong Kong
1996	Wonderland Sydney Commercials	Fred Flintstone, Dino, Top Cat and Choo-Choo	Wonderland Sydney commercials
1996	Cheerios Rocky and Bullwinkle Commercial	Bullwinkle J. Moose and Boris Badenov	Cheerios commercial
1996	Minnesota State Lottery Rocky and Bullwinkle Commercial	Bullwinkle J. Moose	Minnesota State Lottery commercial
1996	The Rocky and Bullwinkle Show	Bullwinkle J. Moose and Boris Badenov	Nickelodeon bumpers
1996	The Rocky, Bullwinkle, Underdog, Roger, and George Show	Bullwinkle J. Moose	Cartoon Network bumper
1996	Ford Explorer Rocky and Bullwinkle Commercial	Bullwinkle J. Moose	Ford commercial
1997	The Rocky and Bullwinkle Show	Boris Badenov	Cartoon Network bumper
1997	The Rocky and Bullwinkle Show 2	Bullwinkle J. Moose and Boris Badenov	Cartoon Network bumper
1997	The Rocky and Bullwinkle Show 3	Dudley Do-Right	Cartoon Network bumper
1997	Looney Tunes Village	Bugs Bunny and Daffy Duck	Warner Bros. Movie World commercial
1998	Thomas the Tank Engine and Friends	Narrator	Bluebird Toys commercials
1999	Game Boy Color with Camera and Printer	Tony the Tiger	Kellogg's commercial
2000	Rocky and Bullwinkle's "You Call This A Marathon?" Marathon	Bullwinkle J. Moose, Boris Badenov and The Narrator	Cartoon Network bumpers
2000	KFC Looney Tunes Chicky Meal Toys	Bugs Bunny and Daffy Duck	KFC commercial
2000	Road Runner Roller Coaster	Road Runner and Narrator	Warner Bros. Movie World commercial, animated in Hong Kong
2001	Looney Tunes Splash Zone	Bugs Bunny	Warner Bros. Movie World commercial
2002	Batman Adventure – The Ride 2	Narrator	Warner Bros. Movie World commercial
2004–2006	Boomerang Australia Bumpers	Bugs Bunny and Narrator	Boomerang bumpers
2006	Looney Looney Fool-A-Thon	Narrator	Boomerang bumpers
2008	Paddle Pop Moo	Paddle Pop Lion	Streets commercial
2012	The Sound Effects of Rocky and Bullwinkle and Friends	Bullwinkle J. Moose	Sound Ideas demo
2012	The Flintstones Gaming Machine	Fred Flintstone	Adelaide Casino commercial
2015	Aldi: Home of the Lowest Prices, Part II	Robot	Aldi commercial

=== Radio ===
List of voice-acting credits on radio
Year	Title	Role	Notes
1986–present	How Green Was My Cactus	Various voices	Syndicated radio program produced and recorded by Bill Dowling at Top Spots Digital/Sound Kitchen
2012	The Looney Tunes Radio Show	Bugs Bunny, Daffy Duck, Porky Pig, Elmer Fudd, Yosemite Sam, Tweety, Sylvester the Cat, Speedy Gonzales, Marvin the Martian, Tasmanian Devil, Foghorn Leghorn, Wile E. Coyote, Road Runner, Pepé Le Pew and additional voices	Unreleased radio series written by Ian Heydon and Doug Edwards and produced and recorded by Bill Dowling at Top Spots Digital/Sound Kitchen in 1991, part of a promotion of Warner Bros. Movie World

=== Discography ===
List of voice-acting credits in music
Year	Title	Role	Notes
1983	The Heliocentric Worlds Of Lunar-Ra	Narrator ("The Prophecies Of Nostradamus")	Album produced in 1983
1984	Australia Laughs	Himself	Album produced in 1984
1989	King Bonza Rides Again	King Bonza the Charismatic, Andrew Peawit, Geoffrey Rabbiton, Dan Chicken, Government General and various voices	Cassette tape produced in 1989
1991	The Christmas Looney Tunes Classic Collection	Bugs Bunny, Daffy Duck, Porky Pig, Yosemite Sam, Tweety, Sylvester the Cat, Tasmanian Devil, Foghorn Leghorn and Director	Cassette tape produced in 1991
1993	Australia's Funniest Answering Machine Messages Impersonations by Keith Scott	Bob Hawke, Gough Whitlam, Darryl Eastlake, Andrew Peacock, Kerry Packer, Santa Claus, Elf, John Hewson, John Laws, Ronald Reagan, Derryn Hinch, Kamahl, Sir Joh, Peter Harvey, Malcolm Fraser, Christopher Skase, Paul Keating, John Howard, Bill Clinton and Sean Connery	Cassette tape produced in 1993
1993	Eat To the Beat	Singer ("Who's On the Menu Tonight")	Album produced in 1993
1994	Blinky Bill and Friends Singing Songs Based on the TV Series	Various voices	CD produced in 1994
1999	Blinky Bill and his "Extraordinary" Christmas Sing-Along!	Various voices	CD produced in 1999
2002	Don and Blinky's Outback Adventure: The Lost Cooee	Various voices	CD produced in 1999
2006	RMK Series 16 Demo	Himself and various voices	Promotional CD
2012	Looney Rock	Bugs Bunny, Daffy Duck, Porky Pig, Elmer Fudd, Yosemite Sam, Tweety, Sylvester the Cat, Speedy Gonzales, Marvin the Martian, Foghorn Leghorn and Pepé Le Pew	Unreleased album produced between 1994 and 1995
2017	Keith Scott: The Voices in My Head Won't Stop	Himself and various voices	CD produced in 2017
2018	21st Century Blues	Himself and various voices	CD produced in 2018

=== Live-action ===
List of acting credits in film and television
Year	Title	Role	Notes
1969	My World and Welcome to It	Leonard Otterquist	Episode: "The Mating Dance"
2004	The Cooks	Wildlife Narrator	Episode: "Swimming Upstream"
2004	Day of Miracles	LA Fireman	Direct-to-video

== Awards ==
=== Mo Awards ===
The Australian Entertainment Mo Awards (commonly known informally as the Mo Awards), were annual Australian entertainment industry awards. They recognise achievements in live entertainment in Australia from 1975 to 2016. Keith Scott won three awards in that time.

Year	Nominee / work	Award	Result (wins only)
1978	Keith Scott	Johnny O'Keefe Encouragement Award	Won
2010	Keith Scott	Comedy Act of the Year	Won
2011	Keith Scott	Comedy Act of the Year	Won
