= Flipper & Lopaka =

- Cover art
- Genre: Adventure; Comedy
- Based on: Flipper by Jack Cowden and Ricou Browning
- Written by: Glen Dolman; Rhett Walton
- Directed by: Yoram Gross (series 1–2); Susan Oliver (series 3)
- Voices of: Keith Scott; Jamie Oxenbould; Robyn Moore (series 1–2); Troy Planet (series 2); Jodie Dry (series 3); Josh Quong Tart (series 3); Jane U'Brien (series 3); Shane Withington (series 3)
- Theme music composer: Clive Harrison
- Opening theme: "Flipper's Theme", performed by Mark Williams (series 1–2); Gordon Downie and Louise Anton (series 3)
- Ending theme: "Flipper's Theme" (instrumental)
- Composers: Guy Gross; Clive Harrison
- Country of origin: Australia
- Original language: English
- No. of seasons: 3
- No. of episodes: 78

Production
- Executive producers: Sandra Gross (series 1); Tim Brooke-Hunt (series 1); Dr. Sylvia Rothblum (series 2)
- Producer: Yoram Gross
- Editors: Djordje Lukic (series 1); Roger Grant (series 2); Dee Liebenberg (series 2); David Stiven (series 2)
- Running time: 24 minutes
- Production companies: Animation Filmakers Corporation; Yoram Gross-Village Roadshow (series 1); Yoram Gross-EM.TV (series 2–3)

Original release
- Network: Seven Network
- Release: 10 September 1999 – 24 February 2005

Flipper & Lopaka is an Australian animated series produced by the Yoram Gross companies: Yoram Gross-Village Roadshow (in Season 1) and Yoram Gross-EM.TV (in Seasons 2 and 3). It has previously aired on Australia's Seven Network at various times and has also aired on the country’s ABC3, a channel dedicated to children's television programs.

== Setting ==
The series takes place on the Millhouse island of Iloka. The islanders survive without the use of modern technology, building huts out of bamboo and fern and eating various fruits found on the island floor. Beneath the surrounding ocean lies Quetzo, a sunken Millhouse island now home to many sea creatures, which unlike Iloka, has many modern influences. The series follows Lopaka, a young Polynesian boy who has the mysterious power to communicate with sea creatures and hold his breath for long periods underwater. He is accompanied alongside his adventures with his many sea-faring friends, including the witty and friendly dolphin, Flipper. Lopaka, Flipper and their friends must work together to thwart the plans of the nefarious Dexter, an octopus wanting to claim Quetzo as his own, and keep peace amongst the underwater domain.

== Characters ==
=== All seasons ===
Lopaka (voiced by Jamie Oxenbould) – an 11-year-old Polynesian boy, referred to in the show as a menehune, who has the power to converse with sea creatures and to hold his breath underwater longer than possible. He was rescued from drowning as a child by Flipper, and they have been best friends since. The islanders of Iloka often wonder where Lopaka disappears to every episode, but he usually manages to avoid speaking the truth (up until Season 3). He wears a red skirt, and an arm band (which all the males wear on Iloka). Lopaka is a loyal friend to sea creatures and islanders alike, and has shown a strong sense of courage time and time again. He has fluffy brown hair that reaches below his ears, and black eyes.

Flipper (voiced by Keith Scott) – Lopaka's best friend, Flipper is a quick-witted, agile, loyal and friendly bottlenose dolphin, whose parents are the rulers of Quetzo. When trouble arises in the underwater domain, the sea-creature citizens turn to Flipper as their leader. Flipper has a light blue underbelly, with a darker blue back. He is known as the most trusted sea creature in Quetzo, and does his best to help everybody he can.

Ottie, Ray and Puffy – Ottie, a sea otter, Ray, a stingray and Puffy, a blowfish, are Flipper's good friends, and they usually accompany him and Lopaka in keeping Quetzo safe. Ottie is the only one of the three who can go on land, making him a valuable asset when Lopaka is not around to help, as well as the only one who lacks gills (though this does not seem to affect him in any way) and who is non-native (real sea otters do not live in the same places as the Polynesians). Ray is kindhearted, and acts as a central motivator of the group, and Puffy, albeit insecure about himself, uses his ability to puff himself out to his advantage.

Dexter – a giant, purple octopus whose main goal is to rule Quetzo. He is deceiving, manipulative, pompous and acts as the main antagonist to the series. Underneath his nefarious outlook, when faced with danger he becomes very scared and cowardly. No matter how many times Flipper saves his life, Dexter will always make up a new plan to try and destroy him. He likes to praise himself for his "excellence", but he is not the brightest.

Serge – a sea snake who acts as the "brains" to Dexter's motivation. He is bright green, with a devious and sharp mind. Even though Serge is to credit for the ideas that are made to destroy Flipper, whenever they go wrong, Dexter puts the blame on him for everything.

Finn, Nip, and Bubbles – three bull sharks who work for Dexter as brainless minions.

Dolores – Dexter's sister who dislikes him, as she thinks of him as very selfish, and she is the only one Dexter truly fears. She occasionally has him babysit her daughter, Inky. She becomes friendly with Flipper and his friends and eventually becomes a famous superstar in Seadom.

Inky – Dolores' daughter and Dexter's niece. Unlike her uncle Inky is nice and is a friend of Flipper's (which he disapproves).

Nola – a young Polynesian girl who wears a simple Yellow dress and a leg bracelet around her right foot. It's also suggested she might be an orphan (though she does mention to have a mother in one episode).

Professor Kerava – Chief Kapuna's friend and is one of the eldest citizens of Iloka that lived here. He remembers almost everything about Iloka by sharing stories with the chief. Kerava is usually known to tell stories to the citizens of Iloka. Kerava turns into a sea turtle every time when Flipper and his allies meet him. However, his name is changed as "Calabash". He is also helpful to other characters. Later in the series he becomes Flipper and Lopaka's spirit guide.

Bomana – Lopaka's father, Bomana is very strict, alongside Chief Kapuna and his wife. He cares for Lopaka about what he is supposed to do and always tells him to follow him.

Bolo – a young fat Polynesian boy who is the Chief's son and likes to mess around with Lopaka. He wears a blue skirt.

Chief Kapuna – the chief of the village and Bolo's father.

Mia – the Chief's wife and Bolo's mother. She's very strict with her husband and son.

=== Season 2 ===
Professor Troy, Spike and Goose – Professor Troy is a talented scientist who wants to find out the history of Quetzo and Iloka, and the reason that it sank. She is good hearted and her son, Spike, is friends with Lopaka and is surprised the Menehune can get along without 20th century essentials. He tries teaching them about it by playing along with them. Goose, Troy's off-beat assistant is a young man of few words; every time he speaks, he does so with an accent. For example, if he were to say "Help me!", he would say it slowly, in a low voice. He wears an aqua vest and jeans.

=== Season 3 ===
Captain Barnibus Crab, Kim, Simon – Captain Crab is a short, modern-day pirate who has come to the waters of Iloka to search for Neptune's Statue and Neptune's Trident. His barefoot niece, 18 or so year-old Kim has come to assist him, and also gain pirating experience. Kim is an eager pirate, and is the technical wiz of the ship. Simon on the other hand, is a large deck hand/chef. He is accident prone, and will commit piracy, but he is really a gentle giant.

Ultra – a pink dolphin, who was taken from her parents as a baby. She grew up in a science lab, and was stolen by the pirates to search the ocean floor. After a few incidents, Ultra proves herself a true, worthy companion, and Flipper gladly takes her into the group. Later in the series, Ultra finds her parents, along with a little sister, Delta.

== List of episodes ==
=== Season 1 (1999) ===
#	Title	Summary	Air date
1	The Lost City	Lopaka's presence in the sea brings him on trial before Dexter but Lopaka and Flipper rescue everyone from a Fishing Ship Drift Net.	10 September 1999
2	The Secrets of Quetzo	Dexter plots to take over both the undersea city and Iloka while Lopaka is tasked to take a sacred stone to the Quetzo temple.	11 September 1999
3	The Volcano	Dexter is attracting nasty folk into Quetzo and is about to activate the Iloka volcano.	12 September 1999
4	The White Whale	Flipper meets a white whale and her calf who are hiding from an exploration ship. Flipper saves the whales, who then save the exploration scientist.	13 September 1999
5	Lopaka's Gift	While Lopaka is looking for a gift for Nola's birthday, he goes with Flipper to liberate pearls that Dexter stole.	16 September 1999
6	The Showdown	The killer whale Orci returns to Quetzo to settle a score with Flipper, but the dolphin is able to negotiate a peace with him.	17 September 1999
7	The Good Shark	Some sawtooth sharks and their big partner Fang invade Quetzo, until Flipper convinces Fang his partners are not his friends.	18 September 1999
8	The Sea Serpent	Dexter's garbage causes pain to a giant serpent. Lopaka is able to help the serpent and overcome his fear of serpents as well.	19 September 1999
9	The Drought	Dexter plans to freeze Iloka with an iceberg, but instead it saves the island from drought.	20 September 1999
10	Lights, Camera, Dexter!	Dexter takes the opportunity to star in a movie by kidnapping the director, but Lopaka and Flipper come to his rescue.	21 September 1999
11	King for a Minute	Dexter's crown switcheroo causes the Iloka Chief to lose his title and put the village at stake, but Flipper and Lopaka restore the Chief's place.	22 September 1999
12	The Castaway	Presumably the Chief's lost brother Bunty has returned, but it turns out to be Bunty's pet parrot. However Bunty is around on another island.	23 September 1999
13	The Little Blue Fish	A fish called Jojo feels out of his depth, but he proves his worth as Dexter's saviour.	8 October 1999
14	The Oil Spill	Oil pollution is affecting the people of Iloka. Help from the manatee Charlie reveals it's just one leaky barrel.	11 October 1999
15	The Circus	Inspired by the Ilokans' new year circus, Dexter starts his own, leaving Lopaka and Flipper to recover from him the Iloka equipment he stole.	12 October 1999
16	The Sting of the Stonefish	Some stonefish are ostracised in Quetzo and one of them accidentally poisons Nola. Lopaka provides the cure and the stonefish earn their place.	13 October 1999
17	The Secret Weapon	Dexter steals a book from Calabash and uses its secrets to build a cannon, yet Lopaka manages to prevent Dexter from using it.	14 October 1999
18	Dexter's Wedding	Dexter starts his own campaign to run for mayor of Quetzo, but needs a wife to accomplish it, but Flipper saves Dexter from marrying a beguiling jellyfish.	19 October 1999
19	High Tide	A rising tide is threatening Iloka and the Menehouni build a sea wall. Dexter takes advantage of this to declare himself king of Iloka, but Flipper and Lopaka wash him with the flood out of the village.	20 October 1999
20	Dexter's Delinquents	Dexter recruits some bully boys to join him, while Flipper teaches young fish games of Finball. Dexter challenges Flipper's team to a Finball match. Despite Dexter's cheating, Flipper's team narrowly wins.	21 October 1999
21	Girl Power	Nola trains hard for an island race, while Dexter's niece Inky joins the Ocean Explorers, both determined to prove that girls have what it takes. Inky outwits Dexter, while Lopaka and Nola both win the race.	25 October 1999
22	Bolo the Runaway	Tired from his chores, Bolo decides to make a run for it. After uniting a lost seal pup with his mother, Lopaka rushes to Bolo's rescue before the ocean current can drag him away.	1 November 1999
23	Surf's Up!	Lopaka introduces surfing to his people. Dexter tries to put a stop to the surfing, an incoming waterspout puts Iloka in danger. The Menehouni make it to safety, but Dexter gets caught in the waterspout.	5 November 1999
24	The Trap	Hoping to earn a reputation, Dexter traps Lopaka to stage a rescue. Bolo saves Flipper from being washed ashore, while Dexter's plan does not work the way he wanted it.	11 November 1999
25	The Monster from Quetzo	Dexter traps Flipper in the ruins of a dolphin city and uses a diving suit to invade the island, while his sharks attack the fleeing Ilokanians.	12 November 1999
26	The Homecoming	Dexter finds the Quetzo Crown. Flipper rescues Lopaka's father from a storm and Flipper's parents return and prevent Dexter's coronation.	13 November 1999

=== Season 2 (2000) ===
#	Title	Summary	Air date
27	Mysterious Island	With the absence of Flipper's parents, Dexter returns with allies to retake Quetzo. Meanwhile, Lopaka and Nola follow Bolo's trail on the dangerous Tabu Island.	5 February 2000
28	Strangers in Paradise	Dexter relocates to Tabu Island, where a scientist named Troy arrives to study Quetzo, Flipper rescuing her from Dexter. Her son Spike pays a visit to Iloka.	15 February 2000
29	The Eclipse	Dexter steers Troy to Quetzo, so he can steal Flipper's throne. When that fails, he uses the sun's eclipse to his advantage. With help from Troy's submarine, Flipper gets his throne back.	19 February 2000
30	Secret of the Seven Crystals	Dexter decides to do things Troy's way to reverse the Quetzo disaster. Realising Troy's intentions, Lopaka and Flipper seek to be the first to procure the crystals.	26 February 2000
31	Puffy the Pied Piper	Dexter hopes to put Flipper in a bad light during a carnival in Quetzo. He uses Puffy to lure the fish into a trap, but Flipper thwarts the ruse.	
32	Treasure Hunt	While Spike is going on a treasure hunt event, Flipper prompts Dexter to drive Troy away from Quetzo so Franny the manatee can safely give birth, but then Lopaka has to come to Troy's rescue.	
33	The Big Wave	Dexter plans to switch the Quetzo crown with a fake one to rig his place as ruler of Quetzo. Lopaka warns Iloka of an incoming tsunami.	
34	Flying is not for the Foolish	Bolo wants to build a flying machine, prompting everyone else to try. Dexter believes he is destined to fly, which Troy takes advantage of to make money.	
35	Dexter's Big Gulp	Troy and Goose brave the Temple of the Four Elements and get one of the crystals. Dexter accidentally swallows the crystal. Only Achuca berries can save his skin.	
36	Magic Medicine	Iloka fever has affected Chief Kapuna and Lopaka goes with Flipper to acquire the cure from Dexter's grotto. Troy becomes highly interested in the curing plant.	
37	Terrible Titan of Tabu	Dexter gets hold of a Quetzo machine from the Tabu cave to invade Flipper's palace. Nola helps Lopaka find the weakness to the machine.	
38	The Crystal Cave	Dexter steals a power crystal, while Troy causes a cave in. Flipper comes to the rescue and recovers the crystal while Lopaka set off to prove Spike did not steal Kapuna's mask.	
39	Big Bones	Dexter steals from Troy an ancient key to unlock a chamber in Quetzo and accidentally triggers a staff to resurrect a dinosaur. Lopaka lures the dinosaur and reverses the summoning.	
40	Ghosts and Monsters	After a failed attempt to recover an emerald necklace, Lopaka locates Nola and Spike stranded on an island, and helps inhabitants defeat the Morgue beast.	
41	Legend of the Sea Dragons	Troy captures a rare sea dragon and Dexter takes a sea dragon egg. Lopaka rescues the sea dragon and her baby and has Dexter take their place.	
42	Goose's Ghost	Spike tricks Goose into searching for Captain Cutlass' sunken ship. However their submersible puts Ray and his family in jeopardy. The ghost matter is cleared up and the ship returned to the seabed.	
43	Electric Soup	Lopaka and Flipper discover a power crystal that conjures storms. Goose messes with the crystal, forcing Lopaka to head there and recover the crystal.	
44	Day of Rest	Dexter babysits his niece Inky, but barracudas kidnap her. Flipper and Lopaka assist in the rescue, while Goose and Spike face a giant spider on their day off.	
45	All Great Creatures	Flipper captured along with Dexter and the sharks by Troy as birthday presents for her friend's son Jeffrey. Flipper convinces Jeffrey to allow him to remain free.	
46	The Carnival	Dexter gets Orci to run a carnival in Quetzo for him, making Flipper feel left out. Flipper saves Orci's mother from Troy's trap and Flipper returns to reclaim his place at the carnival.	
47	The Visitors	Professor Hefty and Jessica come to visit. Dexter unleashes an ancient crab, while Flipper becomes deaf from an explosion. Flipper defeats the crab, while Spike exposes Jessica as a thief.	
48	Fire and Ice	Dexter gets hold of the fire power crystal and tries to boil up Quetzo, while the ice power crystal freezes Tabu Island. Lopaka gets the ice crystal and unites it with the fire crystal.	
49	Flipper's Twin	Dexter recruits a dolphin raised by sharks named Storm to replace Flipper. Lopaka rescues Flipper, who manages to convince Storm, that Dexter used him to conquer Quetzo.	
50	Holiday Island	Some holidaymakers come to Iloka, giving the locals a taste of modernisation. Meanwhile, a sea snake rampages due to a tradition neglected, so Lopaka makes a tribute.	
51	Mirror, Mirror	Flipper finds the power crystal control panel, then gets hold of a weapon and the final power crystal. Lopaka liberates the weapon and crystal to free Spike and Bolo from a mine.	
52	Edge of Doom	Dexter takes all seven crystals from Flipper and delivers them to Troy. Unable to talk Troy out of her sacrificial experiment, Spike does instead. Dexter's attempt to finish the job, destroys Tabu.	

=== Season 3 (2003–05) ===
#	Title	Summary	Air date
53	Something Old, Something New	A series of earthquakes affects Quetzo. Dexter returns and takes over Quetzo. Flipper and a lab dolphin named Ultra along with Lopaka drive Dexter out.	1 December 2003
54	Starstruck	New arrivals come to Iloka consisting of Barnacle Crab, Kim and Simon. They are pirates under the guise of filmmakers. Meanwhile, Flipper, aided by a reluctant Dexter, rescues Ottie.	2 December 2003
55	Sink or Swim	Bolo stows away on Barnacle's sub but gets trapped. Ultra faces her fear of currents to help Flipper and Lopaka rescue Bolo.	3 December 2003
56	Island Idol	Iloka is holding a talent show and Lopaka finds out that Barnacle and his crew are actually pirates. At the talent show, Lopaka manages to expose them.	5 February 2004
57	Blasts from the Past	Flipper and Lopaka travel to the past, where they return the cursed statue of Neptune to the sea. In another time period they have sunk the statue again when Captain Redbeard gets hold of it.	18 February 2004
58	Dolphin Deception	Flipper, Lopaka and their friends carry out a plan to remove Barnacle's ship. Ultra is discovered to be spying for the pirates, but she helps thwart Dexter from sabotaging their plan.	12 September 2004
59	Murky Waters	The pirates have returned. While Flipper drives Barnacle and Kim away, Lopaka saves Simon from drowning.	14 September 2004
60	Leaps of Faith	Simon takes Puffy away. Flipper's rescue attempt gets him captured by the pirates. Bolo trying to attack the pirates gets himself captured. Lopaka rescues them and Ultra joins Flipper.	
61	Secrets and Lies	Dexter gets hold of some dynamite from the pirates. Lopaka has no alternative but to reveal his secrets to his people. Together the Menehouni and the dolphins thwart Dexter's plan and dispose of the dynamite.	
62	Crash Course Crisis	With Lopaka's secrets out, he cannot get any rest. A gigantic shark causes terror, but Flipper is able to get it unwittingly to save Iloka from the unmanned pirate ship.	
63	Dads and Lads	Lopaka sustains injuries and is marooned with Bomana on a sand bar. Dexter captures Flipper's father. After Flipper rescues Lopaka, Bomana rescues Flipper's father and Dexter's lot.	
64	Charming Disarmings	Captain Barnacle is dumping rubbish in the sea. Sparky, a solitary electric eel encouraged by Flipper helps short circuit the pirate ship.	
65	Friends in Need	Fed up with her uncle, Kim leaves, then gets trapped with Nola and Kapuna in a ceremonial cave but sends Lopaka and the dolphins to save them. She then rescues Captain Barnacle and Simon who are trapped in a sea abyss.	
66	Pipe Dreams	A sour note from Dexter's organ hurts Flipper. Dexter takes Ultra hostage, but the Quetzo fish provide Dexter with a pipe allowing Flipper to sabotage the organ and expel Dexter from Quetzo.	
67	Dexter's Demons	Dexter brings a demonic statue to life which makes all gargoyle statues in Quetzo awaken. The gargoyles turn against Dexter. Flipper and Dexter work together to dispel the magic of the statues.	
68	Tossed, Lost and Bossed	After a terrible tempest storm Flipper has to rescue Inky, who was captured by vampire fish. Dexter traps Flipper, but Dolores makes Dexter rescue him.	
69	Bad Boy Flipper	Lopaka and Nola go on the Quest of Courage. Dexter uses a hypnosis charm to get Flipper to do his bidding. Lopaka forfeits the quest and convinces Dexter to help restore Flipper and save Iloka and Quetzo.	
70	In Sickness and Health	Dexter gets injuries, while the Pirates go to Iloka seeking food. Captain Barnacle eats a poisonous fruit, but the Menehouni provide the cure, while Quetzo aids Dexter.	
71	Space Junked	A piece of space junk crashes right into the Quetzo school. Barnacle retrieves the space junk, but his rival Slapbeard takes it and captures Kim and Lopaka, but the dolphins summon the coast guard.	
72	Roboshark	Kim gets a robotic shark but loses the remote to Dexter. Using the roboshark Dexter captures Flipper. The sharks free Flipper to get their jobs back. Lopaka frantically goes after what he thinks is a package of Barnacle's explosives.	
73	He Ain't Heavy, He's My Statue	Catfish burglar Lulu La Rue kidnaps Ottie. Ultra rescues Ottie and notices before her capture the statue of Neptune. The only way to rescue Ultra is to get the pirates to winch her out, thus losing the statue to them.	1 January 2005
74	Trident Trickery	Bolo's bluff about the Menehouni having the trident, gets Barnacle to kidnap Chief Kapuna. The Menehouni create a fake trident for Kapuna's release.	12 January 2005
75	Guess Who's Coming for Dinner	The dolphins and Lopaka go on a long journey, leaving Dexter free to take over Quetzo. While Ottie, Ray and Puffy outwit Dexter, Flipper's lot rescues a fish named Bluey and the pirates from a big fish.	18 January 2005
76	Family Ties	Lopaka manages to put the pirates' radar out of action. Ultra comes across her family and with help from her friends and the pirates drive out a gang of hostile swordfish.	22 January 2005
77	Trident Au Go Go	Lopaka, Flipper and Ultra reach the town Seadom, where superstar Dolores has Neptune's trident. Dexter comes, gets the trident and hands it to Barnacle, but Dolores helps recover it.	23 January 2005
78	Destiny's Children	Dexter steals the trident and hands it over to the pirates. As the storms grow, Lopaka manages to persuade Kim to give up the statue. After Flipper and Lopaka drop the statue into the black abyss freeing Quetzo and Iloka from the curses.	25 January 2005

== International Broadcast ==
- United Kingdom
  - Tiny Pop
- United Arab Emirates
  - e-Junior
- Zambia
  - ZNBC
- (Republic of Ireland) Ireland
  - TG4
- Australia
  - Seven Network
  - ABC3
- France
  - TF1
- Italy
  - Rai 2
- Zimbabwe
  - ZBC TV
- Poland
  - TVP2
- Germany
  - KiKA
- Eswatini
  - Swazi TV
- Middle East
  - Fun Channel
- Mauritius
  - Kids Channel

== Film ==
- Flipper and Lopaka: The Feature, a feature-length film.
