= Bright Sparks =

- Genre: Documentary; Animated series
- Written by: Mark Lamprell; Karl Kruszelnicki
- Directed by: Jeff Gale; Mark Lamprell
- Starring: Keith Scott; Robyn Moore; Taylor Owynns
- Composer: Twilight Productions
- Countries of origin: Australia; United Kingdom
- Original language: English
- No. of episodes: 12

Production
- Executive producers: Michael Caulfield; Phil Gerlach
- Producers: Pru Donovan; Yoram Gross
- Editor: Michelle Cattle
- Running time: 24 minutes
- Production companies: Beyond International Group; Yoram Gross Films

Original release
- Release: 1 February 1989

Bright Sparks is an Australian educational television series that first aired in 1989. The series taught viewers about science and technology. The series included animated characters (Sparky, Alex, and Amy) learning new ideas in science ad technology by bringing them into live action backgrounds to learn the subject.

The series won the 1991 Houston International Film and Video Festival.

== Characters ==
- Sparky (voiced by Keith Scott): A very intelligent robot from outer space. He arrives on Earth to teach Amy and Alex different types of science and technology by transforming into a spaceship and taking the two to new places. Sometimes he gets so caught up in the subject matter, he starts to ramble. Sparky also gets caught in between Amy and Alex's constant arguments.
- Amy (voiced by Taylor Owynns): A 12-year-old girl who embarks on adventures with Sparky alongside her brother Alex. She's very arrogant and is always trying to prove her knowledge superior to Alex, despite her learning most of the information from Sparky.
- Alex (voiced by Robyn Moore): Amy's boisterous 7-year-old brother. He's always eager to learn new things with Sparky and asks many silly questions about the subject matter (to which sometimes are correct). He also argues with Amy constantly.

== VHS and Home Video Releases ==
In 1996, VHS copies of these episodes were released in the United Kingdom:

- Energy
- Water, Water Everywhere
- Cars, Planes, Bikes, and Trains
- Feeding Our World
- Animals
- My House
