= How Green was my Cactus =

Australian radio program

How Green Was My Cactus is a daily syndicated Australian radio program that has been broadcast since 1986. It is a political satire in the form of a radio play featuring characters that portray the ministers and shadow ministers of the Australian parliament.

== Background ==
The program is currently produced by Triffique Productions, The director and head writer is Doug Edwards, and it and stars Keith Scott and Robyn Moore, who portray the male and female characters respectively. Each episode lasts two minutes and takes the form of a dialogue between Australian political figures, although the show frequently lampoons other topical subjects, such as sports (particularly cricket) and well-known television advertisements. The music theme for How Green Was my Cactus was composed by Tony King and David Bates in 1986.

== History ==
The program commenced in 1986 during the tenure of the Labor Hawke government in Australia, and featured Bob Hawke as its main character, although the program usually referred to him as "King Bonza the Charismatic" - a reflection of Hawke's larrikin image and populist appeal. The title of the show is taken from the family saga movie about Welsh life How Green Was My Valley and is a reference to the dramatic, soap-opera elements that frequently characterize Australian political life.

The program is the longest-running radio serial in Australian history (passing the ABC radio drama Blue Hills, which ran for twenty-seven years) and is the longest-running radio serial still being broadcast in Australia today.

== Syndication ==
The program is carried on over fifty radio stations nationally. Typically it is broadcast by smaller adult contemporary radio stations, which unlike larger FM stations may not have the resources to produce their own in-house variety programs for the morning and evening drive timeslots. Consequently, those syndicated stations often play the program twice during the day, both in the morning and in the evening.
