= Fabbri and Partners =

British publisher

Fabbri and Partners Ltd., located at 24 Old Bond Street, London, was an English publishing house active in the late 1960s and early 1970s.

In the second half of the 1960s, in association with Fratelli Fabbri Editori of Milan who specialised in this format, they published a series called The Great Musicians series: texts accompanied by classical music LPs and issued on a weekly basis. In the 1970s the company became known especially for the Mr. Men series of illustrated children's books and other works by Roger Hargreaves. Further publications included Naked Yoga by John Adams and Malcolm Leigh.
