= Evelyne Lallemand =

French writer (1951–1997)

Evelyne Solange Lallemand
- Born: July 1951; Saint-Vallier, France
- Died: November 1997 (aged 46); Paris, France
- Citizenship: French
- Occupation: Writer
- Years active: 1970s–1997
- Known for: Continuing The Secret Seven series
- Notable work: The Secret Seven continuation series; Mr. Men and Little Miss books

Evelyne Solange Lallemand (July 1951 – November 1997) was a French writer, noted for her continuation of Enid Blyton's The Secret Seven in the 1970s, producing an additional eleven books to add to Blyton's fifteen. Nine of them were translated into English by Anthea Bell between 1983 and 1987.

Lallemand also worked alongside Viviane Cohen and Colette David in writing and illustrating 24 Mr. Men and Little Miss books after the death of Roger Hargreaves in 1988. 13 of those stories were translated into English and became a part of the main series.

Lalleman was born in Saint-Vallier in July 1951. She died in Paris in November 1997 at the age of 46.
