= List of Space Racers episodes =

The following is a list of episodes from the series Space Racers.

== Series overview ==
Season	Episodes	Originally released		
Season	Episodes	First released	Last released	Network
Webisodes	8	March 22, 2011	April 29, 2011	PBS Kids
1	50	May 2, 2014	October 24, 2014	PBS Kids
2	40	October 31, 2016	November 22, 2018	Universal Kids

== Episodes ==
=== Webisodes (2011) ===
The series was originally titled Space Race until 2012.

#	Title	Topic	Original air date	Status
1	"Eagle Wingstrong"	Earth	March 22, 2011	Lost*
2	"Pigeon Pirelli"	Moon	March 22, 2011	Lost
3	"Vulture Albatross"	Space Stations	March 22, 2011	Lost
4	"Colonel Coot"	Mars	March 22, 2011	Lost
5	"Sabia Wingstrong"	Sun	April 22, 2011	Lost
6	"Robyn Egger"	Mercury & Venus	April 22, 2011	Lost
7	"Condor Wingstrong"	Asteroid Belt	April 29, 2011	Lost
8	"Master Crane"	Jupiter	April 29, 2011	Lost

- wase found in a youtube video added to youtube before 2019 but the video got deleted sometime in 2025.

=== Season 1 (2014) ===
No. overall	No. in season	Title	Directed by	Written by	Original release date	Prod. code
1	1a	"Where Are We?"	Mark Risley	Sam Dransfield	May 2, 2014	103
Eager to emulate their favorite television hero, Captain Cosmos, cadets Eagle, Robyn and Hawk zoom off into space – only to encounter powerful solar flares that hurtle them down onto the surface of an unfamiliar planet. Stranded there until space conditions clear up, they must use their keenest observational and analytic skills to try and determine the composition of the soil and rocks, weather conditions and various other factors, hoping to figure out where they are in the Solar System and how to get back home... only to discover, in the end, that they've been back on Earth the entire time.
2	1b	"Starling, D.S.V."	Mark Risley	David H. Steinberg	May 2, 2014	126
Sandpiper is returning from an outer space mission when her rockets fail upon re-entry, and she splashes into the ocean and sinks. The teachers and students try to plan a rescue mission, but all are too big for Coot's smaller scale prototype of a new deep space rescue sub – all except for Starling! The brave junior cadet submerges into the deep sea to trace Sandpiper's path way down to the ocean floor. But with Sandpiper's rockets disabled, Starling must somehow find a way to rescue her. Will she be able to use her observational skills – and maybe some discarded rocket boosters – to build an evacuation sled to bring Sandpiper to safety?
3	2a	"Total Eclipse"	Mark Risley	Mark Risley; Michael Daedalus Kenny	May 9, 2014	115
With the first solar eclipse in 26 years looming, Stardust Space Academy is preparing for the "Eclipse Run," a tradition wherein two random students are chosen to race to the Moon and back during the eclipse. As the big day draws near, two Racers are picked: Eagle and… little Starling?!! Eagle is both amused and aghast at the lack of competition. But Starling is determined to compete, so she engages Robyn to tutor her. Thinking the race will be a piece of cake, Eagle lets his guard down and begins to slack off… until the solar eclipse strikes, plunging the race into darkness – an event that overconfident Eagle did not bother to prepare for.
4	2b	"Fly Like an Eagle"	Mark Risley	Allan Neuwirth	May 9, 2014	109
A deep space probe, designed to collect data in far off galaxies, prematurely reappears in our Solar System… on a collision course with the Sun. Headmaster Crane knows if it gets too close to the Sun's gravity, the probe and all its collected research will be lost forever, so he assigns Eagle, Robyn and Hawk to intercept it and guide it safely back to Earth. The problem is, Eagle has a faulty heat shield that must be repaired, so at the 11th hour he's scrubbed from the mission – leaving Hawk and Robyn to take off without their usual leader. How will they save the day without Eagle's help?
5	3a	"Star Signs"	Mark Risley	Allan Neuwirth	May 16, 2014	121
While everyone in school learns about our Solar System's many constellations, and how to identify them by their unique shapes, Eagle is resistant. Studying is tedious; he's got "a need for speed!" As always, Eagle would much rather be out soaring through space, exploring, seeing new things and going new places! But when a fellow cadet named Crow is missing, Eagle, Robyn and Hawk are tasked with trying to find him. Their main clue: a cryptic radio message from Crow in which he talked about "following Swan." Who is this mysterious Swan, and where was he leading the missing Space Racer to? Our three sleuths must learn to ask the right questions if they ever hope to find him.
6	3b	"Vulture's Volcano"	Mark Risley	Allan Neuwirth	May 16, 2014	127
Eagle, Robyn, Hawk and Raven are tasked by Headmaster Crane to learn more about planet Earth by studying an extinct volcano. The cadets are split into two teams: Hawk and Raven are the recon team assigned to a flyover and observation of a dormant volcano island, while Robyn and Eagle will man the mission center and analyze the observations and data transmitted. During their inspection, Hawk and Raven discover a secret operation run by Vulture and Dodo inside the volcano – to mine rocket fuel! The data coming in, however, shows that the volcano is no longer dormant… and it begins to erupt, trapping Vulture and Dodo. Will Robyn and Eagle be able to guide Crane and the Racers to the rescue of the greedy fuel makers?
7	4a	"Mars Canyon Race"	Mark Risley	Allan Neuwirth	May 23, 2014	102
It's time for a Stardust Space Academy tradition: the exciting annual race across Mars's rocky canyons, which happens once every Martian year (twice as long as an Earth year). Coach Pigeon is busy training and preparing the cadets, who aspire to be as good as the legendary all-time Mars Canyon Race champion, Swift Starlight. The race will span some difficult terrain that the cadets have not explored before: Valles Marineris, the red planet's grandest canyon of all. Eagle and Raven get into some serious boasting and taunting, each confident that he'll handily beat the other… which leads to a dare: why wait for the official race? They'll quietly meet after class at Valles Marineris and settle the bet to see who's faster. Without telling anyone – only Starling sees them go – they head off to do just that, which leads them both into some serious trouble.
8	4b	"Election"	Mark Risley	Allan Neuwirth	May 23, 2014	104
Seeing an opportunity to make some positive changes at the Academy, Eagle nominates himself as Class President... only to be challenged by Robyn, who also feels she'd make an effective leader. They agree that the only fair way to decide is to hold an election, so both candidates are soon off and running. Robyn takes a thoughtful approach, analyzing what the Racers can realistically hope to change, while Eagle makes brash, absurd promises – but coasts to victory based on his popularity. Problem is, now he finds he has to actually deliver on his crazy campaign pledges – including putting a second Moon in orbit around the Earth, which leads to a near-catastrophe in space when the new "Moon" adversely affects the gravitational pull on Earth's ocean tides.
9	5a	"Ace Space Reporter"	Mark Risley	Allan Neuwirth	May 30, 2014	129
The Space Racers watch archival TV footage about the legendary Swift Starlight's last race, just before he inexplicably vanished and was never heard from again. Intrigued, Robyn decides to pursue the cold trail of his mysterious disappearance by interviewing several teachers and writing a story for the school blog. Robyn, Eagle and Hawk track Swift's disappearance to a site on the far side of the Moon, where they find some leftover paint and a few other clues. After gathering more information back at campus, Robyn finally unravels the mystery of Swift Starlight – but will she be able to write her story and tell the world about it?
10	5b	"Above and Beyond"	Mark Risley	Allan Neuwirth	May 30, 2014	120
After a spirited Orb-O game in which Eagle displays his usual athleticism (as well as a bit of showboating), Robyn does a scientific analysis of his "patented spin-fling-and-score move," and suggests improvements. Eagle, however, is all about instinct – and wants no part of Robyn's ideas. But when the team is sent to correct the course of an errant deep space probe that is unexpectedly heading towards certain destruction in Saturn's rings, Eagle is faced with a choice of much greater consequence than in any Orb-O game. Will he embrace Robyn's analysis, which just might save the day… or will the probe, and maybe the team, become lost forever in Saturn's rings?
11	6a	"Eyes on the Prize"	Mark Risley	Allan Charles Neuwirth	June 6, 2014	134
Headmaster Crane asks the cadets to study objects in the Solar System, and then share their findings with everyone else. But Raven doesn't want to share… which leads the others to not want to share either! So Crane comes up with an alternate plan: a Solar System Scavenger Hunt, combining a race and a trivia game. The hunt will lead each cadet on their own adventure to various locations throughout the Solar System, to solve riddles provided by AVA. And the final clue will give the winner a reward "more valuable than any of them can imagine"! Will the Racers solve the riddles? And what will their mysterious reward be?
12	6b	"Mine, Mine, Mine!"	Mark Risley	Allan Charles Neuwirth	June 6, 2014	136
Eagle, Robyn and Hawk are having trouble sharing their belongings with one another, so they're each awarded one unique tool from Coot's workshop that they don't have to share with anyone else: Eagle picks grippy tires, Robyn picks night vision goggles, and Hawk picks a super-powerful drill. While on an exploration trip to the Moon, they get separated from the class and find themselves stuck in a collapsed cave. Will the Racers overcome their inclination to keep their favorite items to themselves, or will they find a way to collaborate and escape the cave?
13	7a	"Asteroids, Platinum Edition"	Mark Risley	David H. Steinberg	June 13, 2014	119
After the Racers are assigned to study an asteroid, nefarious nogoodnik Vulture gives Hawk a secret mission: place a retro rocket on the asteroid to change its trajectory. Keeping any kind of secret from his friends makes Hawk nervous, and Eagle senses something is wrong. On the mission, the Racers try to calculate the asteroid's trajectory, carefully figuring out where to intercept it so they can study its flight path. After some trial and error they land on it, where Hawk attempts to complete his secret task…but his pals see what he's up to and get him to spill the beans. Eagle and Robyn are baffled. What's so special about this asteroid? And why does Vulture want to change its flight path? Analyzing the asteroid's composition, the cadets are shocked to discover that it's largely made of platinum! What's more, the new trajectory has altered the asteroid's course…aiming it directly at Vulture's private space station. Now how can they foil his greedy plans?
14	7b	"Lunar Base Blackout"	Mark Risley	David H. Steinberg	June 13, 2014	131
In the middle of a training race on the Moon, all electronic signals suddenly go haywire, causing Eagle to suffer a rare loss to his friends. The Racers find out that there was a power outage on the base, resulting in several malfunctions. Now cut off from all computer or electronic assistance – including AVA – the cadets have to rely on their own investigative skills to figure out how energy is generated on the Moon, discover why it's not working, and most urgently how to get the Moon base operational again. Will they be able to pinpoint the problem and restore power?
15	8a	"Cranberry Crater"	Mark Risley	Allan Charles Neuwirth	June 20, 2014	140
Coot introduces the class to a Spectrometer tool that analyzes the colors of light reflected off of objects in order to determine their composition. The cadets try aiming it at various surfaces and planets, and are excited about the results it provides. But when he points it toward the Moon, Hawk is surprised when the Spectrometer announces that a lunar crater is made of "Cranberry Rocket Fuel"! To further investigate Hawk's amazing finding, the Racers fly to the Moon where they meet Trogon, a Russian rocket scientist who's working in the crater. Will they be able to solve the riddle of Cranberry Crater together?
16	8b	"Dodo in Distress"	Mark Risley	Allan Charles Neuwirth	June 20, 2014	146
Coot has designed a new satellite dish for closer observation of Jupiter, which the Racers have to place in orbit around the giant gas planet. Meanwhile, in an egotistical scheme to broadcast his new TV channel all over the Solar System, Vulture plans to hijack the satellite for his own purposes. So he secretly dispatches Dodo to follow the Racers, and then plant a piggybacking transmitter on the dish. The hapless assistant dutifully follows the cadets to Jupiter… but gets lost in one of its rings and is forced to send a distress signal. With the help of the dish, the Racers try to locate and rescue Dodo. Will they be able to save him from his own troubles, and will Vulture successfully hijack the new satellite to broadcast his megalomaniac messages across the Solar System?
17	9a	"Sick Day"	Mark Risley	David H. Steinberg	June 27, 2014	139
Aaaah-choo! Eagle comes down with a cold, and has to stay back in Stardust Bay while the other cadets get to test a new, highly advanced solar engine system on an obstacle course close to the Sun. Quickly growing bored with his rock collection and other mindless distractions, Eagle decides to do some research about the solar engines and the test mission. He finds out that Mercury's orbit could block the sunlight and render the solar engines useless -- putting the cadets and teachers in danger! Will Eagle's frantic warning reach the test pilots before Mercury casts its shadow on the obstacle course?
18	9b	"Good Old Coot"	Mark Risley	David H. Steinberg	June 27, 2014	145
When Starling's beloved doll Mr. Rocket Baby goes missing, she learns that sometimes when things are hard to find, they're often right in front of you. A typical day in the life of Coot finds him constantly kept busy helping teachers and cadets with their respective projects…. explaining to Robyn how planets are discovered… installing a reflective mirror on the Moon so Pigeon and the cadets have enough light to hunt through a dark cave in search of polar ice… even helping Eagle and Hawk track down Raven in a game of tag. Even as Coot tries to help Starling find her missing doll, he has his own riddle to solve: finding new exo-planets. Is the clue to his major discovery hidden in some of the problems he solved earlier?
19	10a	"Robyn's Winter Break"	Mark Risley	Allan Charles Neuwirth	July 4, 2014	144
Winter Break is about to begin, and the cadets share their ambitious vacation plans: Hawk will visit 7,000 asteroids in seven days, Raven is going canyon racing on Mars, and Eagle will have fun ring diving around Saturn, but Robyn hasn't been able to make up her mind… other than to just go where her wings take her. In the last training race of the semester, however, she injures a wing and learns she'll have to recuperate at home during the whole break! With Crane and Coot's help, Robyn finds new ways of exploring interstellar space in the Space Academy Observatory. Who is going to have the most exciting Winter Break stories during show and tell?
20	10b	"Three's a Crowd"	Mark Risley	David H. Steinberg	July 4, 2014	107
Utilizing a high-powered telescope, Robyn and Hawk locate a particular destination in space and fly there to seemingly spend some time together without inviting Eagle along. This leaves their friend frustrated and upset at being left out. After a series of fruitless attempts to learn why they went without him, Eagle locates the pair via the same telescope, and decides to secretly follow… all the way to Jupiter's volcanic moon, Io, where he observes their activities. When Eagle accidentally reveals himself, Robyn and Hawk resent being spied on. The friends quarrel – but soon find themselves having to frantically work together to escape an erupting volcano. Later, safely back on Earth, Eagle learns why his friends left without him: they wanted to surprise him with a weird-looking volcanic rock from Io for his "secret" oddly-shaped rock collection!
21	11a	"Mars Map Mystery"	Mark Risley	Allan Charles Neuwirth	July 11, 2014	112
Studying at the Mars campus, Eagle, Robyn and Hawk stumble upon a mysterious old map that seems to reveal a network of Martian canals built by some ancient civilization. If they can find them it would be the discovery of the century, not to mention an A+ presentation in class. Their search takes them on a wild trek across the red planet, where they brave a massive storm, tornadoes, dust devils, and even an encounter with Sojourner, the original Mars rover – but no sign of any "canals"… only to discover that the map is a fraud, and the idea of Martian canals was debunked long ago. Eagle is downcast until he realizes that their search has yielded a discovery just as interesting: a dry river delta, evidence of Mars' watery past. No aliens, but it still a nifty presentation!
22	11b	"The Sweet Spot"	Mark Risley	Allan Charles Neuwirth	July 11, 2014	123
During an impromptu Orb-O game in space, a pass goes awry and sends the orb sailing toward the hull of a refueling station – and the light tap unexpectedly sends the entire station hurtling toward Earth! Chasing after it at top speed, Eagle and friends manage to stop the station. They check it for damage, and it appears to be just fine. Close call. Now all they have to do is put it back where they found it, and no one will be any the wiser… but when they try to put the station back in orbit, gravity pulls it right back toward the Earth! They try again, but this time, it falls toward the Moon! What's going on here? How can they get it to stay in one place like it did before?
23	12a	"Careering Off Course"	Mark Risley	Allan Charles Neuwirth	July 18, 2014	108
It's Career Day at the Academy, when the Racers are evaluated for their most suitable future job and given a chance to try it out. To their surprise, Robyn and Eagle find their roles reversed: Eagle is pegged with a "boring" post as a Scientist, and Robyn the "pointless" post of Test Pilot. The only one who's thrilled is Hawk, tabbed as a Fuel Taste-tester. Initially resenting their reversed assignments, Robyn and Eagle find they must team up in their new roles to rescue Starling when she and Coot's weather balloon are swept away by a weather phenomenon called "Cloud Suck." The Racers learn to appreciate each other's talents, seeing that their chosen pursuits are equally worthwhile. Hawk, meanwhile, learns that too much of a good thing can sometimes be not so good.
24	12b	"Drifting"	Mark Risley	Allan Charles Neuwirth	July 18, 2014	TBA
While returning from an intergalactic school conference, Headmaster Crane and Vulture get caught in a powerful geomagnetic storm. With their propulsion and communications systems now rendered useless, they're left drifting aimlessly in space somewhere between the Moon and Earth. As the unlikely pair attempts to work together to solve their own dilemma, the worried Space Racers launch rescue teams to try and find them. The cadets search high and low, flying through Crane and Vulture's last known location in space, while Starling is assigned the important job of using the telescope to scan the stars for the lost rockets. Will they be able to collaborate and find them before they disappear in the vastness of space? And will Crane and Vulture get past their clashing personalities to assist in their own rescue?
25	13a	"Hawk's Day"	Mark Risley	David H. Steinberg	July 25, 2014	101
As part of his training, Hawk is unexpectedly assigned to lead a mission to the Moon. His job: to supervise the use of a new Lunar Elevator to lift a group of freighters carrying valuable Moon rocks up into space, and then lead the convoy safely back to Earth. There's only one problem: Eagle –– who's accustomed to being named Mission Leader – can't seem to stop offering unwanted advice and suggestions to his insecure friend, which leads them all into big trouble as their convoy is bombarded by a powerful meteoroid stream. The cadets learn that they must work together if they hope to overcome their obstacles.
26	13b	"Satellite Starling"	Mark Risley	Allan Charles Neuwirth	July 25, 2014	114
During a playfully competitive game of Orb-O above the Moon, Hawk and his friends accidentally damage the solar-powered Lunar Elevator just as it's lifting a group of rockets from the surface up into space – rockets who now find themselves trapped aboard a broken elevator. To make matters worse, thanks to the Earth's natural orbit around the Sun, they'll all soon find themselves on the dark side of the Moon. Can Coot and the Space Racers repair the elevator before everyone is plunged into extreme darkness and cold? And can Eagle, Robyn and Hawk rescue little Starling, who's been innocently playing with the missing part that Coot needs to effect his repair, but is now lost inside a massive ever-shifting maze of space garbage.
27	14a	"Fearless Flyers"	Mark Risley	Allan Charles Neuwirth	August 1, 2014	141
The cadets are preparing flights of exploration for their vacation. While Robyn and Eagle pick Venus, Hawk and Raven plan something much bolder, where few Racers dare to go: they'll visit some unexplored areas of the Solar System's outer planets. While visiting the Academy map room to prepare for their trip, Coot shows them an ancient map of the outer planets with scary names for some unexplored regions: the Fog of Confusion, Giant Protector of Uranus, and the Evil Winds of Neptune. Undaunted, Raven and Hawk make it to the far side of the Solar System but encounter unusual occurrences, just as predicted by the map! Will they be able to identify the mysteries as natural phenomena, or will the "Evil Winds of Neptune" sweep them away into the darkness of space?
28	14b	"Hawk's Valentine"	Mark Risley	Allan Charles Neuwirth	August 1, 2014	143
On Valentine's Day, Hawk receives a mysterious, old-fashioned card with no addressee… only a cryptic poem inviting the recipient to meet on the far side of the Moon. Who could this secret admirer be? Robyn, Eagle and Raven try to help Hawk solve the mystery of the sender. Analyzing the card using their senses and investigative skills, they trace it back to Sandpiper! But who was the intended recipient…? And will the Racers bring the seemingly lovelorn couple back together for one more date?
29	15a	"Space Racer Storm Chaser"	Mark Risley	Allan Charles Neuwirth	August 8, 2014	110
Watching the Earth from space, Eagle, Robyn and Hawk are enthralled by the beauty of their home planet as seen from a distance. But their wonderment is short-lived when they spot a huge storm front moving along a path directly toward Stardust Bay. Uh oh! Eagle and Hawk race back to school to alert everyone and pitch in with protective measures – but Robyn, ever curious, decides she wants a closer look at the dangerous hurricane. Promising to maintain a safe distance from the storm, she flies closer… and closer… and soon finds herself in deep trouble. The power of observation is the only thing that can save her now.
30	15b	"(N)ice Work if You Can Get It"	Mark Risley	Allan Charles Neuwirth	August 8, 2014	105
Eagle, Robyn and Hawk overhear Headmaster Crane talking with Coot about top secret "Project P.S.P.", and how the mission will require a great quantity of ice. Eager to score points with their instructors, the three Space Racers take the initiative to search the Solar System to find whatever ice the Headmaster was referring to. Their efforts take them to other planets, an asteroid belt and a frozen comet… where they face frustration at their inability to get the job done, and learn that they need to use the right tools and work together to achieve their goals. When they finally make it back to Stardust Bay for the big event, the cadets are stunned to learn that "P.S.P." stood for "Pigeon's Surprise Party"… and the ice that Crane sought was simply buckets of ice cubes for the rocket punch!
31	16a	"A Simple Re-Quest"	Mark Risley	Allan Charles Neuwirth	August 15, 2014	111
While cleaning up space garbage in low Earth orbit, the Space Racers encounter a remnant from one of Stardust's earliest space programs: Quest One, a ghostly old space station that's long since been decommissioned and presumed lost. Snooping around the control room, they accidentally reactivate its dormant computer guidance system (QUESTY, a very early version of AVA) – and find themselves trapped inside as the station begins to re-enter Earth's atmosphere in a pre-programmed directive to self-destruct. Eagle, Robyn and Hawk frantically experiment with different tools as they attempt to turn off the program before it's too late, to save themselves and Questy.
32	16b	"Hiding on Hyperion"	Mark Risley	Allan Charles Neuwirth	August 15, 2014	138
Eagle, Robyn, Hawk and Starling play a game of hide-and-seek around Saturn. Eagle quickly finds everyone except Starling, whose engines have frozen shut while she hides inside an icy cave on the moon Hyperion. Starling is cold, frightened, and marooned in the cave, but she can still relay her observations via radio. Using the minimal clues she's able to provide, the other Racers have to methodically search every single cave on the pockmarked moon to find Starling and rescue her. Will they be able to find her before their own engines freeze shut?
33	17a	"RoboCoach XL-5"	Mark Risley	David H. Steinberg	August 22, 2014	130
Vulture fires Coach Pigeon and replaces him with the new RoboCoach XL-5, purportedly to modernize the training of future generations of Space Racers… but in fact, the robot was really built to spy on Coot's new Solar Sail invention. After finalizing an untested upgrade to the XL-5 to improve its spying capabilities, the relentless RoboCoach malfunctions in the gym – and forces Vulture to take part in an extreme training class. Will the Racers be able to save Vulture from the crazed RoboCoach, and ultimately get their beloved Coach Pigeon reinstated to his job?
34	17b	"Trail Blazers"	Mark Risley	Allan Charles Neuwirth	August 22, 2014	124
The cadets and Coot are spending time in Jupiter's orbit to clean up some old space station & rocket junk for recycling, with the help of a new suction harpoon tool. When Raven discovers a new comet that's passing by, Coot suggests collecting a rock sample to learn more about it. Raven, without asking permission, "borrows" Coot's harpoon and shoots it onto the comet in order to collect the sample. The suction device attaches – but Raven accidentally gets tangled up in the harpoon cord, and is pulled at high speed towards Jupiter's giant red spot! Now the other Racers need to try and rescue him before the comet pulls Raven into Jupiter's atmosphere.
35	18a	"Dome Grown"	Mark Risley	Allan Charles Neuwirth	August 29, 2014	117
To surprise Headmaster Crane when he arrives the next day, Eagle and friends are creating a garden under a glass dome on the Mars campus. But thanks to an accident while they're playing near Coot's workshop yard during their break, our heroes are relegated to clean-up duty and must collect mounds of junk from upended trash bins. When they finally get back to the garden, they're shocked to discover the vegetation drooping and wilting miserably. What went wrong?? The cadets launch an urgent investigation to figure out why the plants are failing, and to try to rescue them before Crane can see. Starting from the premise that these same plants would have thrived on Earth, they set about comparing the differences between Mars and Earth, hoping that will lead them to the answer.
36	18b	"Dance Lessons"	Mark Risley	Allan Charles Neuwirth	August 29, 2014	135
It's time for the annual Space Dancing Show! Robyn is preparing for her dance routine when Starling stumbles in and wants to be part of the show. But her dancing skills are not quite there yet, so Eagle suggests she join Coot's Safety Team instead. In order to join the team, cadet Starling needs to learn rescue techniques and safety procedures, which she practices diligently. The day of the big Space Dancing Show, the cadets encounter danger from an incoming asteroid field. Will Starling be able to utilize her newly learned skills to lead the space dancers out of harm's way?
37	19a	"Grounded"	Mark Risley	David H. Steinberg	September 5, 2014	113
Eagle, Raven, Hawk and Robyn wait outside Headmaster Crane's office to be brought in before him. Clearly, they're all in big trouble. Eagle blames Raven, Raven blames Eagle; even Robyn and Hawk have their own opinions. As they quarrel, we flash back and learn how they got into this mess: the Racers are on a class trip to Venus not far from a creepy old abandoned space station, rumored to be haunted, in orbit of the planet. In a test of bravado, the kids screw up their courage to enter the dark, scary space station. What happens next becomes a matter of opinion and point-of-view: which of them accidentally set events in motion that caused the space station to re-enter Venus's atmosphere and break up? In separate vignettes, we see and hear what transpired from each Space Racer's POV — which couldn't be more different — until Headmaster Crane finally confronts them to deduce the truth.
38	19b	"Here Comes the Sun"	Mark Risley	Allan Charles Neuwirth	September 5, 2014	TBA
Headmaster Crane, insisting that the Sun can rise from the West, makes a bet with a skeptical Vulture. The stakes? The loser of the bet must dress up as a silly mascot for the next Orb-O match and dance in front of the whole academy. Trying to help the headmaster, the Racers travel to different locations on Earth and the Moon, develop hypotheses about sunrises, and finally discover that the direction of the sunrise depends upon the rotation of a planet. So they fly to Venus -- which rotates clockwise -- but since they're not able to land there, cannot confirm their hypothesis. Will they be able to prove that the Sun indeed can rise in the West, and make Vulture dress up at the next Orb-O match?
39	20a	"Starling: Space Racer!"	Mark Risley	Allan Charles Neuwirth	September 12, 2014	128
Eager to become a Space Racer, Starling first has to pass several tests in order to be officially certified. Usually Coach Pigeon oversees the testing, but Vulture (who greedily wants to drill for fuel under the Spacenasium building) has replaced him as Chief Training Officer. Eagle, Robyn and Hawk offer to train Starling for the test, which Vulture will then have to administer. Since the Racers cannot use the Spacenasium to practice, they find alternate methods to help train Starling to simulate take-off speeds, maneuver Mars storms, land on icy surfaces using retro-rockets, and dodge asteroids. Will they be able to prepare her for the ultimate test and allow Starling to fulfill her dream?
40	20b	"Titanic Trip"	Mark Risley	Allan Charles Neuwirth	September 12, 2014	125
Eagle, Robyn and Hawk have a four-day weekend coming up, so they do some research to decide where to spend a camping holiday. After briefly consulting AVA, they conclude that Titan is the most Earth-like body in the Solar System… so off they head for Saturn's famous moon. Crane slyly asks them, while they're there, to please observe and note any small differences between Titan and Earth. Once they reach Titan, they realize that while there are a few similarities, the two places are vastly different! Liquid methane lakes, lava ice, a 16-Earth-day night, thicker atmosphere, freezing cold temperatures and lower gravity all make for an interesting science project… but an incredibly uncomfortable and stinky camping experience.
41	21a	"Starling Discovers the Moon"	Mark Risley	Allan Charles Neuwirth	September 19, 2014	118
Young Starling makes a startling discovery one night: Earth's Moon seems to be smaller than the last time she saw it. Can this be? Worried, she begins to chart the state of the Moon every night, which only confirms her worst fears: the Moon is disappearing!!! When she rushes around like Chicken Little, frantically warning everyone, they're amused at her concern (and naïveté), and try to calm her down... but no one effectively explains how the Moon waxes and wanes over the course of each month. Determined to save what's left of the Moon from disappearing altogether, Starling decides to travel all the way up there herself and do what she can to avert this catastrophe.
42	21b	"Three Racers and a Baby Robot"	Mark Risley	Allan Charles Neuwirth	September 19, 2014	133
While he's distracted one morning, Coot's new baby robot escapes from his workshop! Lost, it roams around the school campus until it adopts Robyn as its new owner. Dinky, as Robyn affectionately names the little bot, followers her around everywhere and displays a surprisingly diverse array of talents. As she and her friends spend more and more time with Dinky, they learn more about what it can do. Meanwhile, a worried Coot searches high and low for his missing robot. When Robyn finds out who Dinky really is, will she be able to give up her new "pet"?
43	22a	"A Tight Squeeze"	Mark Risley	Allan Charles Neuwirth	September 26, 2014	132
As Stardust Bay prepares to launch a Time Capsule into space, the students and teachers pick out their favorite items to include in the capsule's 25-year journey. Vulture's beloved Limburger cheese-flavored fuel bars, Starling's favorite "My Lunar Pony" TV episodes, and of some of Eagle's coveted unusual rock collection are just a few of the capsule's contents. Nostalgic to relive an old school tradition, the teachers and Vulture squeeze themselves into the crowded capsule, just for fun… when Dodo accidentally locks them all inside and triggers the capsule's take-off sequence! The Space Racers must work against the clock to try and free the trapped Academy staff from the capsule, before they're lost in space for 25 years.
44	22b	"AVA Retires"	Mark Risley	Allan Charles Neuwirth	September 26, 2014	137
The Space Racers are exploring the Northern and Southern Lights, which are created through solar storms hitting the magnetic field of the Earth. But when AVA is unable to answer a simple technical question from the cadets ("Why there are more solar storms during the spring and fall?"), she shuts herself down to run a full self-diagnostic – leaving the Racers stranded without her guidance. In fact, without AVA all communications at Stardust Bay are also down. When she finally comes back online, Crane explains that we still don't know why there are more solar storms in spring and fall; it's not AVA's fault that she doesn't know. Will she accept this and go back online to guide the Racers home before they run out of fuel?
45	23a	"Vulture's Statue"	Mark Risley	Allan Charles Neuwirth	October 3, 2014	116
When Vulture demands that a larger statue of his glorious image be erected on the school campus, the funds must come from somewhere – and the first casualty is the school's large telescope. After all, who needs a "stupid old telescope"? The Space Racers are soaring through space all the time, he reasons; they can see whatever they need to see with their own eyes. Problem is, once the telescope is gone, no one notices a massive comet on a dangerous trajectory for their space station on the moon! Now the cadets need to race against the clock to somehow avert the impending disaster, when some simple observation in advance would have made their job a lot easier.
46	23b	"Follow the Water"	Mark Risley	Allan Charles Neuwirth	October 3, 2014	148
The Racers objective is to detect and follow water as an indicator of life on Mars. Meanwhile, Hawk, preoccupied with an upcoming "Captain Cosmos" convention on Jupiter's moon Europa in which fans gather to act out their favorite episodes from the show, draws ridicule from the other Racers. But he finds support from a sympathetic Crane, and the two form a special bond that soon has Hawk sounding more and more like the inscrutable headmaster in his own daily conversations. Drawing even more ridicule from his friends over this, a dejected Hawk finds some other rockets flying to the Captain Cosmos play-acting event… and he decides to join them. Will Hawk find what he is looking for at the Convention, and what lessons will he learn?
47	24a	"Watch This Space"	Mark Risley	Allan Charles Neuwirth	October 10, 2014	150
Eagle excitedly reports having observed an unusual, bright light in the sky. But when he brings the other Racers to see it too, there's nothing there. Did Eagle actually see something, or did he just make it up? Taking Headmaster Crane's advice, the cadets try to solve the puzzle of the bright light. Testing various hypotheses to explain the sighting, they conclude that Eagle must have seen a variable star, whose brightness changes over time but which is very difficult to detect. With the assistance of AVA's database and Coot's new software for predicting supernovae, they calculate the spot from where they might observe the next supernova from space. Eagle and the cadets fly there… but will they arrive in time to witness the luminous spectacle themselves and confirm Eagle's observation?
48	24b	"The Hawk Factor"	Mark Risley	Allan Charles Neuwirth	October 10, 2014	122
Preparing for the Cloud Sprints Race, Eagle beats everyone else by a mile during a training run. Raven, hoping to cut corners so he can beat perennial winner Eagle, craves a new fuel that will help his engine achieve maximum speed. Under the pretense of making this improved fuel available for everyone, Raven gets Coot to experiment with new formulas in his lab… where they identify a fuel powered by space beans that gives them super-speed. Desperate to win the race – and thinking it will give him the edge – Raven switches labels on the fuels so that he's the only one using the new concoction. Will his sneaky plan help him win, or will it just give him a bad case of space bean tummy ache?
49	25a	"Hawk's On It"	Mark Risley	Allan Charles Neuwirth	October 17, 2014	142
When Coot has to leave to attend a school board meeting, he entrusts a nervous Hawk to watch over the workshop for the afternoon. Doing his best to follow Coot's instructions that by utilizing the right tool you can fix anything, Hawk finds himself dealing with one emergency repair after another; cadet after cadet comes streaming in with bent wheels, dented wings, a misadjusted helmet, clogged rocket boosters, and other problems. Will Hawk be able to find the right tools for the repairs and get some help from his friends along the way?
50	25b	"Communication Breakdown"	Mark Risley	Allan Charles Neuwirth	October 24, 2014	106
Things are suddenly going haywire around Stardust Bay: electrical outages, power surges, TV channels changing themselves. Coot is racing himself ragged trying to fix and tinker, but to no avail. A solar storm is the root of the problem, Headmaster Crane determines, and the Space Racers must travel to the Academy's communications satellite in space to attach a special shield. Problem is, along the way a series of misunderstandings leads to a complete breakdown in dialogue between Eagle, Robyn and Hawk… so there they are in space, trying to restore communications – and they're not communicating! If they hope to save the day, somehow they must find a way to get past their differences and work as a team. Note: This episode is the season finale.

=== Season 2 (2016–18) ===
This was the first season not to air on PBS Kids.

No. overall	No. in season	Title	Directed by	Written by	Original release date	Prod. code
51	1a	"The Haunted Asteroid"	Mark Risley	Allan Charles Neuwirth	October 31, 2016	213
The cadets learn that every 50 years, on Halloween, a haunted asteroid passes really close to Earth during its orbit around the Sun - and that years ago, four daring young racers supposedly went to explore the mysterious asteroid... but never came back! Eager to debunk the myth, Robyn leads a jittery Eagle, Hawk and Raven into space to find the asteroid (if it even exists) and prove that it's not haunted at all. Armed with the necessary tools for their mission - a digital camera and recording equipment - the kids take off. Spooky proceedings ensue, with things that go bump in the night, strange ghostly images captured on their camera, and the discovery of a creepy rocket ship junkyard. When Eagle and his friends uncover the truth about the asteroid, it's something they never expected!
52	1b	"Satellite Songs"	Mark Risley	Allan Charles Neuwirth	October 31, 2016	201
When the racers pick up a mysterious musical frequency from space, all the cadets and teachers in Stardust Bay find that they can't stop whistling or singing the catchy tune. What is it and where is it coming from? To try to solve the mystery, Eagle, Robyn and Hawk head into space. Through careful observation and deduction, they finally discover the music's source: the Voyager One satellite probe, who has been sailing through the cosmos for many years and recently lost his way. Voyager's golden record contains images and sounds for space travelers or alien worlds to discover in the future, and learn about our culture. The helpful cadets give Voyager a boost, and help set him back on course toward the edge of the Solar System.
53	2a	"Different"	Mark Risley	Allan Charles Neuwirth	November 4, 2016	209
When a physically disabled new cadet arrives one day, the racers are afraid to ask about his short wing. But fearless little Starling approaches Merlin, learns that he was born that way, and that he's perfectly okay with it. Coach Pigeon announces a race to Mars and its moons in teams of two, and the cadets pick their teammates. No one chooses Merlin, so Coach teams him up with Eagle, who's not happy with the idea of being slowed down. As the race begins, Eagle and Merlin get off to a slow start... until Merlin unexpectedly twirls in a tornadolike spin and blasts ahead of everyone - helping them cross the finish line first! Famed scientist Dr. Sparrowhawking emerges from the crowd in his wheelchair to congratulate Merlin, telling the thrilled young rocket that he knows all too well about overcoming a disability... and that Merlin is destined for greatness, too.
54	2b	"Paint Your Rocket"	Mark Risley	Allan Charles Neuwirth	November 4, 2016	203
During a race across Saturn's moon Titan, a cryovolcano blast strips Hawk of his colors. Eager to look like himself again, he goes in for a paint job, but a robotic error causes the cadet to emerge with a new, shockingly colorful body. He soon finds himself idolized by young groupies who follow his every move, turning him into the campus 'rock star.' To Eagle and Robyn's dismay, their friend has become ruled by his newfound fame. Inspired by Hawk's new status, Crow flies to Titan and quickly finds himself in danger. When the older cadets soar to the rescue, Hawk acts on his instincts to rescue Crow from an icy blast, accidentally stripping his paint off again. Now deemed a hero for his actions, Hawk realizes that he prefers to be guided by what really counts: what's inside. He schedules a new paint job and to everyone's relief, emerges looking like his old self.
55	3a	"Cadet Dodo"	Mark Risley	Allan Charles Neuwirth	November 12, 2016	212
When Vulture fires Dodo, the forlorn assistant doesn't know what he'll do or where he'll go. Wanting to help, the kids suggest that he enlist in Stardust Space Academy. Dodo's intrigued: he can actually do that? Headmaster Crane agrees to give him a chance, so the cadets welcome the newest Space Racer to their team: Cadet Dodo. On a group mission with Eagle, Robyn and Hawk to Saturn's moon Io, Dodo makes an accidental discovery: a previously uncharted (and very smelly) sulfur lake. Back on Earth, Vulture gets wind of the find. Wanting the glory for himself, he quickly rehires his former sidekick and, on a wing-shake of newfound trust, they're reunited. Space explorers are granted the honor of naming their discoveries... so Dodo cheerfully names his Vulture Lake... which, to Vulture's chagrin, turns out to be the stinkiest lake in the solar system!
56	3b	"Great Balls of Fuel"	Mark Risley	Allan Charles Neuwirth	November 12, 2016	211
The cadets and teachers journey to far-off Deep Space Station Gagarin for a closer viewing of the vast Kuiper Belt, hosted by their old friend, Russian rocket scientist Trogon. When Eagle and Raven sneak away for a game of space tag - zipping through the tubes and corridors of the station - they unwittingly tear a hole in the main fuel storage tank... causing fuel to leak out into zero gravity. Pretty soon everyone is puzzled to see fluid spheres floating by all around them. Galloping globules! A quick check on the fuel tank reveals it to now be empty - the very same fuel they'll need to get back to Earth! The spheres are too fluid and elusive to grasp, causing much slow-motion slapstick mayhem. After some frantic but unsuccessful attempts, the kids finally hit upon a solution: using straws to pierce the floating bubbles and drink the fuel out of mid-air.
57	4a	"Loon on the Moon"	Mark Risley	Allan Charles Neuwirth	November 12, 2016	202
The cadets are on assignment to dig for Helium-3 (the source of their rocket fuel) under the watchful eye of Loon, the eccentric, beloved senior Chief Engineer of Stardust Bay's Lunar Campus. Now about 250, he's been working up there since the school first created its Moon base. When Eagle makes a careless mistake, an angry Vulture blames the elder rocket and demands his retirement. At the big farewell party, all the cadets and teachers show up to honor him. But when a moonquake unexpectedly causes a panic, Loon's experience and relaxed demeanor save the day: unlike earthquakes, which are over quickly, he knows that moonquakes can last for up to 10 minutes. His retirement is overturned by popular demand, and the party becomes a celebration for Loon's next 100 years on the Moon!
58	4b	"Dodo in Charge"	Mark Risley	Allan Charles Neuwirth	November 12, 2016	204
After Headmaster Crane and Sandpiper head off on vacation together, Vulture is up to his old tricks. He mounts a case before the school board to oust Crane... and replace him with Dodo. The Board agrees, and Vulture has his puppet in place. Once Dodo is in charge, however, he believes he's REALLY in charge, and makes foolhardy decisions - like approving Eagle's misguided request for a mission to the Sun. The Sun's gravity quickly proves to be too strong, and the cadet is in danger of being pulled into the Sun's fiery mass! When everyone looks to Headmaster Dodo for what to do, he doesn't know. Crane and Sandpiper, returning from vacation, happen upon Eagle - and just manage to rescue him. Vulture's plot is uncovered, Dodo is ousted, and the Board reinstates Crane.
59	5a	"To Tell the Truth"	Mark Risley	Allan Charles Neuwirth	November 19, 2016	210
Scanning space through a telescope, Robyn spots a new asteroid but can't determine its size. Observing from a distance can play tricks with the truth: faraway objects may look small but can approach us quickly, and objects closer to Earth can seem larger but might still take a while to reach us. When Raven and Crow are sent into space to measure the asteroid, Eagle, hurt at being passed over for the mission, boasts that he's glad he's not going because he and Hawk would miss the big Cosmic Birds concert. Trouble is, they don't have tickets - and the event is all sold out. Caught in their lie, the two friends are teased at school the next day, and turn on each other - becoming so honest that it's hurtful. But they must put their squabble aside and work together to save Raven when his hubris gets him in trouble with the asteroid. In the end everyone learns a lesson about honesty, and what constitutes the truth.
60	5b	"Sneezy Does It"	Mark Risley	Allan Charles Neuwirth	November 19, 2016	208
On a routine mission to collect rock samples from Mars, the cadets cause an uproar when Hawk brings back a stone that contains living bacteria. Coot is overjoyed: the kids have discovered life on Mars!! As a reward, they're given the honor of being first to study the new life form in Coot's laboratory. But the more they analyze it, the more Robyn is puzzled. This bacteria looks so familiar... what is it?? They soon determine that the rock was contaminated by a sneeze from Hawk, who has a cold. Meanwhile, Coot has excitedly been telling everyone about the discovery! When the truth comes out, they're all crestfallen - until Coot explains that proving a theory wrong is often just as important as proving it right.
61	6a	"When You Wish Upon a Comet"	Mark Risley	Allan Charles Neuwirth	November 26, 2016	216
Starling has a crucial flight test to pass before she can move on with her training. The older cadets have been helping her practice, but the day before the big test she's nervous. To calm her, Robyn mentions that a comet should be visible as it passes Earth that night - and it's good luck to make a wish on it. But the comet never shows. Turns out Robyn got the dates mixed up: the comet won't appear for another four months. Starling is crestfallen, and now convinced that she'll fail. But there's still a way to see a comet that night... just not from Earth! Eagle leads the way as they race through space, dodging meteorites and other obstacles that Starling has learned to navigate. They finally see Halley's Comet, and Starling gets to make her wish after all. When Headmaster Crane learns of her brave skills on their trip, he decides that she's already passed the flight test!
62	6b	"Sit, Rover, Sit!"	Mark Risley	Allan Charles Neuwirth	November 26, 2016	215
Eagle, Robyn and Hawk are sent to retrieve three old rovers from Mars, for reassignment to new jobs on Earth. Robyn locates Curiosity and finds that she relates to the no-nonsense robot, whose attention to detail rivals her own. Hawk finds Opportunity, and is immediately fond of the chatty rover. Meanwhile, Eagle locates Spirit buried in a sand pile. As he unearths the damaged robot, he unexpectedly finds himself assisted by a small rover mutt, who helps him to dig. But who is he, and what is his purpose? The little rover trails after him like a faithful pet... so Eagle names him Rover and brings him home. At Stardust Bay, Curiosity and Opportunity are prepared for their new assignments, but Eagle's pet Rover's fate is uncertain. It's only once Spirit is repaired that the truth emerges: the little Rover is Spirit's assistant!
63	7a	"The Little Rocket Who Cried Aliens"	Mark Risley	Allan Charles Neuwirth	December 3, 2016	219
When Raven and Hawk are assigned to help Coot with repairs up at Fuel Station Alpha, Starling laments that she's never picked to do anything. Feeling her pain, Headmaster Crane assigns her an important task: to study space through the Observatory telescope and report any unusual activity. The excited junior cadet embraces her new job, reporting sightings of aliens, weird stars and other imaginary incidents, all fueled by her obsession with My Lunar Pony, her favorite TV show. So when Starling finally spots something truly amiss - Fuel Station Alpha's tools floating loose in space, thanks to Raven's carelessness - no one believes her. She finally convinces Hawk, and the cadets blast off to collect the tools and restore them to the station's supply hatch. To atone for teasing her, Raven must now watch a five-hour My Lunar Pony marathon!
64	7b	"Goodbye"	Mark Risley	Allan Charles Neuwirth	December 3, 2016	217
A faint radio signal is picked up in Stardust Bay... coming from the direction of the Sun. Flying off to investigate, Eagle, Robyn and Raven trace the signal to Mercury instead. It seems to be coming from MESSENGER, a spacecraft that was sent to explore Mercury ages ago - but everyone had long presumed the probe to be destroyed. Is it still functioning? The racers carefully touch down on Mercury's shaded side - a tricky feat thanks to its proximity to the Sun during its broadly elliptical orbit. When they finally find MESSENGER, what's left of him is very weak, and there's nothing they can do to help. But MESSENGER says he's okay about that, and asks them to bring his final images and research back to Earth while he lives out his days on Mercury. The kids bid a sad farewell to the probe, who will always be remembered for his landmark discoveries.
65	8a	"How the Grouch Stole Solstice"	Mark Risley	Allan Charles Neuwirth	December 9, 2016	206
Told in song. Stardust Bay is abuzz about the Winter Solstice. Every year they gather to watch the Sun set on the shortest day, and then celebrate all night - the longest night of the year. But Vulture finds this disturbing: the festivities cause Stardust Bay to lose productivity. Hoping to sabotage the holiday, he sends a team of cadets into space to adjust some satellites, but doesn't reveal his true purpose - to reflect sunlight back to Earth. To everyone's horror, the night sky suddenly vanishes and sunlight bathes the academy. But the kids are undaunted, and continue their celebration. Vulture is stunned to realize that wonder and imagination can't be stopped. Feeling the heat, he shuts off the satellites and a glistening night sky returns. A super Solstice to all - and to all a long night!
66	8b	"Some Body for AVA"	Mark Risley	Allan Charles Neuwirth	December 9, 2016	205
Observing a rousing Orb-O match, AVA wonders how much fun it might be to actually play the game herself. This gives the racers an idea, and with Coot's help they prepare a surprise for their loyal computer guidance system: her very own robotic body! Now she can fly, race around, and eat in the cafeteria with Eagle and friends. She's like a young child, learning everything by trial and error... but once she joins her first Orb-O game, it turns out that AVA is incredibly clumsy. The cadets don't know what to do. Luckily, just as they're about to confront her, AVA admits she's been having similar doubts. Having a body isn't all it's cracked up to be, and she misses her old incorporeal self. Returning to utilizing just her voice and technical expertise, she helps guide the kids to victory!
67	9a	"Something Borrowed"	Mark Risley	David H. Steinberg	April 8, 2017	229
Hawk's puppet show isn't going over well with the junior cadets: the Captain Cosmos puppet doesn't look anything like him, and needs a new head. So Hawk races off at intermission to borrow a rock from Eagle's private collection - a rock that looks just like the Captain. Only Eagle's not there... and time is running out... so Hawk hastily borrows it without permission. While taking his bows after the show, he accidentally drops Eagle's rock and it breaks. What to do now? Going against Robyn's advice, Hawk resolves to replace the broken rock without telling Eagle about it. On route for the asteroid belt, he's taken aback when Eagle suddenly appears and wants to fly there with him! They finally land on Psyche, one of the largest (and more unusual) asteroids in the belt... where Hawk's awkward search ends up teaching him an ironic lesson about honesty.
68	9b	"Orange Outrage"	Mark Risley	Chad S. Burke; Michael Daedalus Kenny	April 8, 2017	207
When the high-flying Rooster Rockets endorse a new energy-boosting fuel drink called Orange Outrage, Eagle can't wait to get his wings on it. But Coach Pigeon bans it from the cafeteria: that junk is bad for growing rockets! To Eagle's delight and Coach's chagrin, they soon find the drink everywhere after Vulture strikes an exclusive deal to offer it at the academy. Orange Outrage's effects begin to show; the racers have engine problems, and trouble sitting still or sleeping. Sneaking backstage before a show, the kids discover their heroes drinking the old fuel instead. The embarrassed Roosters come clean that it was just an endorsement, and after the show they announce that they'll no longer shill for the drink. They thank the cadets for helping them do the right thing, while Vulture is furious - and would do more... if only he didn't feel so sluggish.
69	10a	"Return to Sender"	Mark Risley	Allan Charles Neuwirth	April 9, 2017	214
While Hawk searches for them during a game of Hide & Seek, Starling and Dinky hide inside a box - which turns out to be a crate that's sealed and shipped into space by warehouse robots. The clueless pair has no idea what's going on, but play tic-tac-toe inside the crate to pass the time. Eventually growing restless, they try everything they can to escape from the box... and once they finally succeed, discover that they're now inside a giant warehouse on Mars. Luckily, Russian rocket scientist Trogon happens to be working there at the time. He helps them contact Stardust Bay, and looks after them until Hawk arrives to escort the tiny pair back to Earth... but not before Dinky playfully hides himself one more time - amid the thousands of crates and boxes in the Martian warehouse!
70	10b	"The Happiest Rocket in the World"	Mark Risley	Allan Charles Neuwirth	April 9, 2017	222
While trying to retrieve some papers that Dodo dropped under his desk, Vulture BONKS his head - which completely reboots his sour personality. Suddenly the school board chairman exudes love and joy! Rolling brightly around campus, he compliments one and all, assists cadets in need, joins Starling and her dollies for a tea party, sings and dances and generally tries to help everyone... leaving havoc in his wake. With Vulture's sunny new disposition reaching crisis levels, Crane, Dodo and the kids resolve to somehow restore the old, familiar sourpuss. They try everything they can to anger him, but nothing works - till they finally realize that Newton's Third Law (For every action there is an equal and opposite reaction) is the answer: BONKING Vulture's bottom with an Orb-O orb does the trick, restoring his disagreeable personality... much to everyone's relief.
71	11a	"Counter-Earth"	Mark Risley	Allan Charles Neuwirth	April 15, 2017	221
The cadets find an old book called Counter-Earth in Coot's workshop, and are astonished to read about Earth's identical twin planet on the other side of the Sun. Why has no one told them about this before?! Determined to be first to discover it, Eagle, Robyn and Hawk set off the next morning. Completing a broad arc around the Sun, AVA announces that they've arrived at their destination. But the more they explore, the more they realize they've landed on Mars. Perhaps they flew too far, AVA suggests. So they blast off to try again... and again... yet each time, the kids find themselves on a familiar planet. But their exhausting search pays off when they finally discover a planet that's just like Earth. Only problem is... it IS Earth. Huh?? Turns out, it's all been an April Fools joke by the teachers and AVA. Counter-Earth is science fiction, not science fact!
72	11b	"Star Power"	Mark Risley	Allan Charles Neuwirth	April 15, 2017	220
Captain Cosmos fever grips Stardust Space Academy, as filming of a live-action movie version of the show is announced. Even more thrilling, they're coming to Stardust Bay to shoot the movie - and they plan to cast a cadet as actor Peacock J. Thunderbird's sidekick, Buzzard Boy. All the Cosmos fans get competitive but it's Eagle who lands the coveted role! His ego soaring, Robyn and Hawk feel very relegated to the sidelines. When filming begins near an active volcano, Eagle quickly learns about stunt doubles... but Starling and Crow mistakenly assume he's capable of his (make-believe and carefully choreographed) on-screen feats. Eager to emulate Eagle, the pair gets stuck inside the volcano's dangerous ash plume. Needing Hawk's and Robyn's help to rescue them, Eagle learns about staying humble - and remembering who your friends are.
73	12a	"The Wizard of Mars"	Mark Risley	Allan Charles Neuwirth	April 16, 2017	223
When Starling is excluded from another space mission, she sings wistfully of longing to be part of the team in that great big out there. As the older cadets blast off, their exhaust blows her back, spinning, clutching her doll Mr. Rocket Baby. Everything is a blur... until the haze clears and Starling finds herself in a colorfully wonky, fantastic Mars setting. Grateful that she mushed and squushed mean old Vulture, tiny Mini-Bots direct her to follow the Crimson Canal to the Ruby Red City, where the great Wizard of Mars might help her return home. Along the way, she befriends Eagle, Robyn and Hawk, who also need help from the Wizard. Despite Vulture's vengeful but fruitless efforts to mush and squush them, the foursome reach the magical city... where they learn from the sage Wizard (Headmaster Crane) that they each had the answers all along! Note: This episode is a reference to The Wizard of Oz.
74	12b	"Them's the Brakes"	Mark Risley	Allan Charles Neuwirth	April 16, 2017	224
Assigned to visit a unique feature of our solar system, Eagle, Hawk, and Robyn eventually reach the Oort Cloud, a vast field dotted with icy objects orbiting a great distance from the Sun. But when their engines are disabled by a Proton storm, they find themselves helplessly hurtling forward. Objects moving through space will keep on moving through space unless an outside force stops them... and the Oort Cloud is so empty, there's nothing to stop them. They try radioing for help, and getting an assist from the passing Giotto Probe, all to no avail. With some ingenuity, they figure out how to harness the carbonated thrust from a few bottles of Fizzy Fuel Pop - and even one of Hawk's burps - to change course and finally propel themselves back toward Earth.
75	13a	"Volunteer Day"	Mark Risley	Allan Charles Neuwirth	April 22, 2017	218
At the big Earth Day Fair, the cadets volunteer for assignments to help improve the environment. Leading a cleanup of low-orbit space junk, Robyn recruits her friends, including a reluctant Eagle - who secretly wants to stay home and watch Orb-O on TV. Up in space the cadets have fun, making a game of it... but Eagle feels they're moving too slowly. Eager to finish, he bosses everyone around, speeding them up and making them miserable. Robyn finally dismisses him so he heads back to Stardust Bay... but finds he's even sadder watching the game alone. Chastened, Eagle returns to the group, apologizes and pitches in - doing such a good job that when Coot shows up to inspect the work, he's so impressed that he appoints Eagle full-time Space Debris Clean-up Captain! Eagle laps up the praise, even as he wonders what he's gotten himself into...
76	13b	"Remember the Past, Discover the Future"	Mark Risley	Allan Charles Neuwirth	April 22, 2017	226
Stardust Bay's annual "All-Star Weekend" is a few days away, and most of the kids can't wait to meet some of the academy's famed former cadets. Raven, however, seems unusually quiet. When Headmaster Crane shows them a tribute video that highlights the flying skills of legendary cadet/racer Falcon Fairflight, Raven quietly slips away. What's gotten into him? Turns out he's trying to master Falcon's signature move, the near-impossible "triple corkscrew," but failing miserably. Crane finds Raven alone, wistfully rewatching the video... and wishing he could be more like Falcon, whom we learn was his late father. It's not what Falcon was able to do in the air, Crane explains, it's what he had inside: heart and determination. Raven ultimately finds a way to prove to himself - and to his friends - that he's made of the same strong fiber as his celebrated dad.
77	14a	"New Cadet on the Block"	Mark Risley	Allan Charles Neuwirth	April 23, 2017	232
Everyone is abuzz about a cool new kid who transferred to the academy. Kite's reputation as a daredevil and amazing Orb-O player precedes him, and no one can wait - especially Eagle and Raven, who look forward to the competition. On the day the new cadet arrives, Coot unveils the Observatory's powerful new telescope... which Crow thinks is the coolest thing ever, eagerly learning all about what it can do. Kite quickly lives up to his legend, showing off his athletic prowess and cool demeanor. But he's also a relentless comedian - and seems to have picked Crow for the butt of his jokes. As the bullying escalates and Crow grows more withdrawn, even shying away from the telescope, the other kids decide that enough is enough. Eventually they help Kite understand that no one's laughing anymore, and that an attitude adjustment and apologies are in order.
78	14b	"Dream Big"	Mark Risley	Allan Charles Neuwirth	April 23, 2017	225
Gosling's parents are both freighters, and he's destined to continue in the family business. But the young rocket harbors a keen interest in science and secretly yearns to be a Stardust Space Academy cadet. When Coot catches him listening in on a class, he invites Gosling to join them. Raven is dismissive: what does a freighter know about science and space? But Eagle and the others are more inclusive, and find that they can actually learn a thing or two from this bright, inquisitive kid. When Raven's reckless bravado gets him stranded in space without enough fuel, it's Gosling who calculates just how much fuel they'll both need to return home, and comes to his rescue. In the end, the school welcomes one of its most promising new students: Cadet Gosling!
79	15a	"It's a Mad, Mad, Mad, Mad Galaxy"	Mark Risley	Allan Charles Neuwirth	April 29, 2017	233
The cadets are helping Coach Pigeon polish old Fuel Station Alpha, when Crow accidentally activates a view screen. It's a taped message from Fizzy Finchfuzz, owner of the Fizzy Fuel Pop Company, announcing a big race called The Gravity Slingshot Run. The rules are simple: whoever can slingshot from the orbit of one planet to the next - passing every planet in the solar system, using as little fuel as possible - and return to the station first will win the grand prize: 350,000 bottles of Fizzy Fuel Pop! The greedy kids take off in pairs, while Pigeon follows them to make sure they stay safe and to verify who the winners are. The race turns into a weeks-long, insane scramble through the solar system, with each team encountering one obstacle after another. It's a tie at the finish line, where the kids find out just how OLD Fizzy's taped message was: when they finally taste the fuel pop, it's all stale and flat! Yuchh!
80	15b	"That'll Teach You"	Mark Risley	Angelo DeCesare	April 29, 2017	237
Eagle, Hawk and Raven resent doing all the hard work around the school while the teachers seemingly have it easy. Robyn's not so sure about that... but she can't stop Eagle and gang from complaining to Headmaster Crane. Amused by their protests, he offers a proposal: each of them can take the place of an adult for one day, and judge for themselves. Eagle quickly agrees to replace Crane, while Hawk will take Coot's place and Raven will do Coach Pigeon's job. It isn't long before they realize that appearances can be deceiving, as each cadet struggles to fill the wheels of their older and more experienced counterparts. Okay, they admit it: the life of an adult rocket is just as hard as the life of a cadet. Once they've come to terms with that, it's time to do some damage control...
81	16a	"Double-O Dodo"	Mark Risley	David H. Steinberg	April 30, 2017	234
Vulture loudly fires Dodo again, and Headmaster Crane takes pity and hires him as an assistant. But when Dodo is caught trying to steal the plans for a new engine that Coot is working on for an upcoming competition, Crane realizes that the firing was a charade: Dodo was sent as a spy! Instead of turning him in, however, Crane decides to turn Dodo into a double-spy, sending him back to Vulture with fake plans. The new mission: to bring back the design plans that Vulture's team is working on. But Vulture quickly catches on too, and flips Dodo again, returning him to Crane as a triple spy. The silly Spy vs. Spy espionage continues to escalate, finally coming to a head at the big technology competition where Crane and Vulture square off - and conclude that by working together, they can better solve the design problems both sides were experiencing.
82	16b	"First Do No Harm"	Mark Risley	Allan Charles Neuwirth	April 30, 2017	235
Pluto has been demoted and reclassified as a dwarf planet, but Vulture has big plans for it: "Vulture World," a grand amusement park filled with Vulture-themed rides and attractions. But first they'll need to terraform Pluto and make it more like Earth up there, by adding heat, water, oxygen and dirt. He dispatches Eagle, Robyn, Hawk and Raven to travel there and get to work on it. All is going as planned... until they hit an unexpected obstacle: the discovery of water! The #1 rule of space exploration: If there's any chance of life developing on a planet, or even a dwarf planet, they must leave it alone and return to Earth. Vulture is furious, and not to be denied. So he and Dodo fly to Pluto themselves to continue the cadets' work. But when Dodo accidentally terraforms Vulture's head, causing a flower to sprout there, all activity must cease - for good this time. Aaargh!! Note: This episode has a reference to Disney.
83	17a	"Stardust Rhythm"	Mark Risley	Allan Charles Neuwirth	February 22, 2018 (Canada); May 6, 2018 (U.S.)	230
Robyn and Hawk are excited about the school's Poetry Slam Festival that's coming up soon. And when Eagle learns that there's a grand prize for the winner of the best poem - a cool new space helmet - even he is suddenly into it. The kids begin writing about their favorite subjects; Eagle is all about speed, and Hawk writes about strength, but Robyn suffers a crisis of confidence when she tries to rhapsodize about science and math. Is that cool enough? Meanwhile, Vulture overhears a bit of Sandpiper's poem about the purple skies of Titan, and mistakenly believes that she's interested in him romantically - so he prepares to recite an ode to their mutual love. It all sets the table for an unexpectedly lively festival when the big day arrives, hosted by Poetry Slam Master Crane.
84	17b	"M is for Meteorite"	Mark Risley	Allan Charles Neuwirth	February 27, 2018 (Canada); May 6, 2018 (U.S.)	239
While Robyn interviews Headmaster Crane for a blog story about how science is essentially mystery-solving using evidence and deduction, Coot rushes into the Zen Garden with news that a meteorite has landed somewhere on campus! He doesn't know exactly where, but his detection machines have never been wrong. An excited Robyn wants to find the meteorite, and she enlists Eagle, Hawk and Raven to help. Clues lead them on a path all over school grounds - even underwater, into the bay - till they finally deduce that the rock ricocheted off the Spacenasium's lightning rod... but then the clues run dry. Discouraged, Robyn decides to catch up on other projects, including her blog entry. Which is when she notices something in a picture she took of Crane earlier that day... a rock that wasn't there before, now jutting up from his reflection pond. Could it be...?!
85	18a	"Space Girl Explorers"	Mark Risley	David H. Steinberg	March 15, 2018 (Canada); November 12, 2018 (U.S.)	240
Sandpiper leads Robyn, Starling and Lark off to Jupiter's moon Europa for their Space Girl Explorers meeting. This is Robyn's big chance to get her 150th badge, for Trailblazing, and finally earn her Saturn Stripes. After several unsuccessful attempts, she's dejected and disappointed... until she picks up a mysterious audio signal that includes the words, Hello, aliens. Aliens? The girls have a real mystery on their wings! Now they need the right tool - so off they fly again, this time to a powerful radio telescope in orbit of Mars. There they track the signal and learns that it's coming from outside the solar system. But from whom? Back on Earth, Robyn discovers the source of the radio signal: a very old probe that Coot launched years ago. Robyn finally earns her elusive badge because trailblazing isn't just about finding new physical paths. It's also for discovering new paths of thinking!
86	18b	"Polar Opposites"	Mark Risley	Kate Boutilier	March 20, 2018 (Canada); November 12, 2018 (U.S.)	231
Sandpiper pairs up Eagle with Hawk, and Robyn with Raven, for a mission to repair damage to two satellites. Robyn appeals to her to please reconsider her pairing, explaining that she and Raven couldn't be more opposite - and Raven rudely concurs, illustrating her point. But Sandpiper holds firm, encouraging them to learn how to collaborate. Meanwhile, Eagle and Hawk smugly flaunt their harmonious teaming... which only adds to Robyn's frustration. As things get under way, Raven and Robyn quickly get on each other's nerves. Eagle and Hawk, concerned for their friends' state of mind, decide to secretly stake-out the unhappy pair and to intervene if needed. But things really get interesting when the monotony and close proximity of the stake-out comically strains the boys, while Robyn and Raven find common ground in their desire to avoid conflict...
87	19a	"The Rocket with Two Brains"	Mark Risley	Allan Charles Neuwirth	March 8, 2018 (Canada); November 12, 2018 (U.S.)	236
AVA misses her old friend QUESTY, the computer system on the inactive Quest One Space Station, so Hawk decides to take her there for a visit. Once aboard the station, QUESTY is overjoyed to hear AVA's voice again! While Hawk naps, the two computer programs chatter away and catch up on all the latest gossip. But when a bubble of hot plasma erupts off the Sun and sprays solar particles into space, they wash over the station and trigger a weird technical anomaly: both AVA and QUESTY are somehow merged inside Hawk's head. At first he tries to make the best of it... but their endless yammering keeps him awake at night, distracts him at work and play, and generally drives poor Hawk crazy. Finally he just can't take it anymore, and regretfully enlists Coot's help to separate the two programs from his aching brain.
88	19b	"Hawk the Genius"	Mark Risley	Allan Charles Neuwirth	March 11, 2018 (Canada); November 12, 2018 (U.S.)	228
Hawk makes a series of simple predictions on Earth and in space - all guesses - that happen to come true, astonishing his friends. Even he is amazed at his own newfound powers. Eagle and the other kids hail Hawk as a super genius, and begin soliciting him for advice. Robyn has her doubts, however: you have to make careful observations and study all the available information, you can't just guess! But it's too late, the praise has already gone to Hawk's head. When Crow and Sparrow go missing on Mars, Headmaster Crane sends Eagle, Robyn and Hawk there to find them - and Hawk's luck finally runs out, getting the cadets in trouble with an unexpected Martian dust storm. In the end it takes some intense analysis, led by Robyn, to navigate their way out of the jam.
89	20a	"When the Envy Bug Bites"	Mark Risley	Allan Charles Neuwirth	March 1, 2018 (Canada); November 22, 2018 (U.S.)	227
Raven is envious of Eagle's cool new landing lights, and wants a new array for himself. Headmaster Crane warns him about the dangers of envy, urging him to be content with what he has. But Raven wants what he wants, so when Vulture lures him to his Starflight Emporium & Trading Post, the cadet trades away his old tow-line plus some work IOUs for a brand new lighting array. Still envious of other friends' possessions, he continues to trade in again and again for newer, bigger and better gizmos and gadgets... getting deeper and deeper into IOU work debt to Vulture... finally ending up with his old tow-line again. But when Starling gets into trouble on the moon and needs Raven's help, he discovers that the tow-line turns out to be more valuable than any new gadgets he'd coveted.
90	20b	"Ships in a Bottle"	Mark Risley	Allan Charles Neuwirth	March 6, 2018 (Canada); November 22, 2018 (U.S.)	238
In this clip show, while Eagle and Hawk lug crates of empty Fizzy Fuel Pop bottles down to the recycling center in the basement, they chat animatedly about the big upcoming return performance by the Rooster Rockets. In his excitement, Hawk executes a whirly Rooster move, igniting his afterburner - which accidentally seals the metal door shut. Despite their best efforts the door won't budge, and no one's receiving their radio signals from the deep underground room. And there's no other way out! Hoping someone will realize they're missing and come looking for them, they reminisce about other goofs and blunders from the past, which we see in flashback. Eventually Eagle and Hawk realize they need to save themselves... so they try to tap on an exhaust vent until Coot hears it up above. Rescued! Clips are shown from "Total Eclipse", "Satellite Starling", "A Simple Re-Quest", "Mine, Mine, Mine!", "Careering Off Course", "Space Racer Storm Chaser", "Election", "Mars Map Mystery", "Dome Grown", and "Cranberry Crater". Note: This episode is the season finale.
