= Space Racers =

Animated television series

- Also known as: Space Race (2011–12); The Space Racers
- Genre: Animated; Children's; Educational; Science fiction
- Created by: Richard Schweiger; Julian Cohen
- Developed by: Allan Neuwirth; Mark Risley
- Directed by: Mark Risley
- Creative director: David Michael Friend
- Voices of: Yuri Lowenthal; Meyer DeLeeuw; Johnny Yong Bosch; Alicyn Packard; Melissa Hutchison
- Theme music composer: Jody Gray
- Opening theme: Jody Gray; Allan Neuwirth; David Steven Cohen
- Country of origin: United States
- Original language: English
- No. of seasons: 2
- No. of episodes: 90 (list of episodes)

Production
- Executive producers: Richard Schweiger (season 1); Julian Cohen (season 1); Michael Matays; Charles Matays; Matthias Schmitt (season 2)
- Producers: Space Race, LLC; Mark Risley; Allan Neuwirth
- Running time: 10–12 minutes (individual); 22–23 minutes (half-hour)
- Production companies: Stardust Animation (seasons 1–2); Maryland Public Television (season 1); WNET New York (season 2)

Original release
- Network: PBS Kids (season 1); Universal Kids (season 2)
- Release: March 22 – April 29, 2011
- Release: May 2, 2014 – November 22, 2018

Space Racers is an American animated STEM-focused educational animated television series featuring the space travel cadets of the Stardust Space Academy. The series was produced by Stardust Animation for seasons 1 and 2, and co-produced by Maryland Public Television for season 1, and later WNET for seasons 2 and onward. The show began as a web series on March 22, 2011, entitled Space Race, then debuted as a television series on May 2, 2014, on select public television stations. The second season of the show debuted on October 31, 2016, on Sprout (now Universal Kids). Since the second season, the show's original production funding was provided by NASA, which involves science and space technology education, in partnerships with U.S. Space & Rocket Center and U.S. Space Camp.

== Premise ==
Space Racers is an educational animated television series. The show follows the Space Racers cadets, a group of anthropomorphic spaceships resembling and named after various species of birds, as they travel the Solar System exploring space through assigned missions. The main characters, Eagle, Hawk, Raven, Robyn, and Starling, are cadets at the Stardust Space Academy, and each episode they discover a series of space-based scientific discoveries. The cadets spend each episode traveling through outer space.

== Characters ==
=== Main ===
- Eagle (voiced by Yuri Lowenthal) is a natural fearless leader and cadet at the Stardust Space Academy. As the fastest out of all the cadets his age, he can sometimes get a bit overconfident in himself and his skills, and it can go to his head, causing him to become a bit cocky. His natural leadership skills and confidence can also cause him to not listen to others when he thinks that his way is the best way. However, he is not afraid to admit that he has made a mistake and try to correct it.
- Hawk (voiced by Meyer DeLeeuw) is a powerful and brave cadet at the Stardust Space Academy and a member of the Space Racers. Hawk can memorize anything that he sees or hears, even if he does not understand it.
- Raven (voiced by Johnny Yong Bosch) is an extremely fast cadet at the Stardust Space Academy who loves to race, Raven shares a healthy rivalry with Eagle, who is regarded as the fastest Space Racers cadet. Raven is always ready to learn new things and help out if needed. Raven can be overly prideful and selfish, which can cloud his judgement and cause him to do things that he does not always think through first. However, he will own up to his mistakes and try to put things right in the end.
- Robyn (voiced by Alicyn Packard) is a very smart cadet at the Stardust Space Academy. Robyn is inquisitive and a keen observer, and loves finding about new things from books. A so-called "whiz kid," she is the best precision flyer on the team, as her knowledge of physics gives her a big advantage. Robyn is very close to Starling, with whom she has a sibling-like bond.
- Starling (voiced by Melissa Hutchison) is a junior cadet at the Stardust Space Academy. While Starling may be small, no one can say she is short of enthusiasm or ambition! She looks up to the older Cadets a lot, especially Eagle, who she wants to be like when she gets older. She also displays a sense of courage that is more suited a rocket twice her size. She is currently in training to become a Space Racer like her friends.

=== Recurring ===
==== Minor ====
- AVA (voiced by Melissa Hutchison) is the academy AI that runs the systems for the Space Academies and assists all Racers with navigation and any questions they may have.
- Crow (voiced by Katie Leigh) is a junior cadet at the Stardust Space Academy, and Sparrow's best friend.
- Sparrow (voiced by Alicyn Packard) is a junior cadet at the Stardust Space Academy, and Crow's best friend.
- Headmaster Crane (voiced by Phil Lollar) is the headmaster, and a teacher at the Stardust Space Academy. With years of experience, Crane knows more about space than probably any other craft alive. Quiet and reserved, he is the leader of the Stardust Space Academy, and an accomplished flyer.
- Coot (voiced by Joseph J. Terry) is an instructor and professor at the Stardust Space Academy.
- Coach Pigeon (voiced by Rick Zieff, credited as Danny Katiana for the first season) instructs cadets in flying techniques at the Stardust Space Academy. He was formerly the famous racer Swift Starlight; Robyn learns about his identity and agrees to keep it secret.
- Sandpiper (voiced by Katie Leigh) is a famous Space Racer and a well-known explorer. She is roughly the same age as Headmaster Crane, Coot, and Vulture, who she attended Stardust Space Academy with.
- Rapacious J. Vulture (voiced by Joseph J. Terry) is chairman of the school board at the Stardust Space Academy. He is infamous for making several selfish schemes around Stardust Bay.
- Dodo (voiced by Phil Lollar) is Vulture's bumbling assistant, and helps with all of his schemes.

==== Other ====
- Kiwi is a junior cadet at the Stardust Space Academy.
- Trogon (voiced by Rick Zieff) is a Russian rocket scientist who works in the crater, the giant warehouse on Mars, and Deep Space Station Gagarin. He also graduated from the Sputnik Space Academy.
- Dinky is an assistant robot created by Coot.
- Merlin is a cadet at the Stardust Space Academy. He was "born" with one wing smaller than the other, and rather than getting it replaced, kept it.
- Loon (voiced by Rick Zieff) is the eccentric, energetic, and beloved Senior Chief Engineer at Lunar Base Alpha. He is also referred to by Vulture as the senior officer at the moon base, and mentions that he has been working on the base since its construction.
- Mallard: Hawk's cousin.
- Giotto Probe (voiced by Allan Neuwirth) is a probe who once tried to help the cadets who were stuck in a Proton storm.
- Falcon Fairflight is a racer who raced Swift Starlight in the last race of his career. Racing around the moon and back, Swift allowed Falcon to take the lead and then mysteriously disappeared. Falcon ended up winning the race by default. Falcon is also the father of Raven.
- Kite is a cadet at the Stardust Space Academy who was transferred from another school. He originally bullied Crow when he first arrived.
- Fizzy Finchfuzz (voiced by Allan Neuwirth) is the owner of the Fizzy Fuel Pop Company.
- Budgie was Hawk's former best friend while growing up, until her family moved away.
- Sojourner (voiced by Katie Leigh) is an original rover found on Mars.
- Lark (voiced by Kalynn Harrington) is a junior cadet at the Stardust Space Academy.
- Magpie is a cadet at the Stardust Space Academy.
- Warbler is a cadet at the Stardust Space Academy.
- Questy is a program on the old Quest-1 satellite. He/She was an old friend of AVA. Questy was male in Season 1, but was made female in Season 2.

== Episodes ==
Season	Episodes	Originally released		
Season	Episodes	First released	Last released	Network
Webisodes	8	March 22, 2011	April 29, 2011	PBS Kids
1	50	May 2, 2014	October 24, 2014	PBS Kids
2	40	October 31, 2016	November 22, 2018	Universal Kids

== Production and development ==
The series concept was developed by Richard Schweiger, who wanted to create a show based around animated vehicles that travel through space. In 2009, Schweiger and Julian Cohen developed the idea into a feature-film script, which won a screenwriting award. In January 2010, Schweiger formed the company that would produce Space Racers, and instead of pursuing a film, decided to turn the concept into a television series. The idea developed into fifty individual 11 minute episodes for broadcast.

=== Collaborations ===
The Space Racers TV series was produced in collaboration with NASA experts, with input from NASA experts on science-based facts incorporated into the episodes. The show also features NASA scientists and astronauts in live action interstitials. The Space Racers creators have also developed a website where viewers can find a preschool science curriculum on space science, which was developed in collaboration with Thirteen Productions (WNET) and SiiTE. SpaceRacers.com has a section for family-based education as well for educators and parents. Special screenings of episodes have been held at both the Kennedy Space Center and the Wallops NASA Visitor Center, in collaboration with Maryland Public Television. In July 2014, the Virginia Air and Space Center opened a Space Racers-themed exhibit.

=== Web series ===
On March 22, 2011, it originally launched as a web series under the name Space Race. It featured 4 characters/webisodes at launch, with two more webisodes released on April 22, 2011, and the last two on April 29, 2011. In total, there were 8 characters/webisodes (with 2 characters not returning in the TV series). All eight of the characters were interviewed by Gary Galaxy (played by Meyer DeLeeuw), a 3D Galaxy Adventure game, printables, and the “What Spaceship are You?” widget.

In 2012, the web series was retitled to Space Racers.

=== Television series ===
In January 2013, it was announced that the web series would relaunch as a television series, with most of the characters remodeled and having new roles, along with some new characters. The show premiered worldwide on February 15, 2014, and in the U.S. on May 2, 2014. Since 2014, CAKE Entertainment is the international distributor for the show.

In mid 2016, the show was renewed for a second season, which premiered on October 31, 2016.

== Broadcast ==
In the United States of America, the show was distributed by American Public Television and aired on select PBS stations from May 2, 2014, to October 31, 2016, and Universal Kids from October 31, 2016, to October 25, 2020.

In Canada, the show aired on Knowledge Kids from May 2, 2014, to November 26, 2015, and TVO Kids from November 27, 2015, to September 30, 2021.

=== International ===
Country	Network(s)	Language	Foreign title
United States	PBS Kids; Universal Kids	English	N/A
Canada	Knowledge Kids; TVOKids	English	N/A
United Kingdom; Europe	Minimax	English	N/A
Argentina	Nat Geo Kids; V-me; V-me Kids	Spanish	Exploradores Espaciales (Space Explorers)
Brazil	Nat Geo Kids	Brazilian; Portuguese	Exploradores Espaciais (Space Explorers)
China	CCTV	Chinese	N/A
France	France 5 TF1; TFO	French	Les Cosmopilotes (Cosmopilots)
Malaysia	TV2	English	N/A
New Zealand	TVNZ Kidzone	English	N/A
Poland	MiniMini+ TVP ABC	Polish	Kosmoloty (Spaceships)

== Home media ==
=== DVD ===
1091 Pictures released the first two seasons on DVD and Blu-ray Disc on March 8, 2022. The first season was released on three discs, while the second season was released on two discs.

Release name	Release date	Eps No.
Space Racers - Season 1	March 8, 2022	Disc One: Disc Two: Disc Three:
Space Racers - Season 2	March 8, 2022	Disc One: Disc Two:

=== Streaming ===
The show was first available worldwide on YouTube since May 2, 2014, and Netflix from March 15, 2015, to March 15, 2018, and March 31, 2020, to March 31, 2021. The show was added to Amazon Prime Video, Tubi, Fandango at Home (formerly Vudu), and Roku on February 25, 2022. The show was removed from Tubi in 2024, and later Prime Video in 2026.

== Awards ==
Space Racers has won several awards in children's broadcasting including the American Public Television (APT) Programming Excellence Award in 2014 and a Parents’ Choice Recommended Award in 2015.
