= Big Bag =

American children's television series

- Title card
- Genre: Puppetry; Educational; Sketch comedy
- Created by: Nina Elias-Bamberger
- Developed by: Lou Berger; Allan Neuwirth; Gary Cooper
- Directed by: Emily Squires; Yoram Gross
- Starring: Selena Nelson; Cullen Douglas; Clare Sera; Tessa Ludwick; John Mountford; Ashley Jones; James Ryan; Puppeteers: Joey Mazzarino; Rickey Boyd; Alice Dinnean; Jeff Conover; James Stone; Matt Vogel
- Voices of: María Conchita Alonso; Fran Brill; Kevin Clash; Allen Enlow; James Spector
- Narrated by: Andrew Sachs ("William's Wish Wellingtons" segment)
- Theme music composer: Michael Abbott; Sarah Weeks
- Opening theme: "Big Bag!"
- Ending theme: "Big Bag!"
- Country of origin: United States
- Original language: English
- No. of seasons: 2
- No. of episodes: 39

Production
- Executive producers: Nina Elias-Bamberger; Buzz Potamkin; Khaki Jones
- Producers: Nina Shelton; Marie Poe (animation)
- Production locations: Disney-MGM Studios; Bay Lake, Florida
- Editors: Scott P. Doniger; Julie Sanker
- Running time: 54 minutes (season 1); 24 minutes (season 2)
- Production company: Children's Television Workshop

Original release
- Network: Cartoon Network
- Release: June 2, 1996 – May 11, 1998

Big Bag is an American live-action/animated puppet children's television series created by Nina Elias-Bamberger for Cartoon Network and Children's Television Workshop. It was targeted at preschool viewers. The show was co-produced by Cartoon Network and Sesame Workshop, with Muppet characters created by the Jim Henson Company. It aired from 1996 to 1998, with reruns airing through 2001, alongside another program titled Small World. Localized versions of Big Bag aired on Canal J in France and Yorkshire Television in the UK.

== Plot ==
The principal Muppet character is Chelli, a Muppet dog who is joined by his best friend Bag. Chelli and Bag run a general store. They live on Main Street in an unidentified town with their human friend Molly and a variety of other animals named for their species. Two sock puppets named Lyle the Sock and Argyle McSock work as stockroom boys and often interact with the main cast. In season 2, a humanoid Muppet character called Sofie was introduced. The first season features frequent interaction with a large cast of human regulars, including an assortment of child friends and colorful locals.

== Cast and characters ==
=== Muppets ===
- Chelli (performed by Joey Mazzarino) – A patchwork dog who is the main Muppet character of the series. In "Elmo's Visit," it is revealed that he is a pen pal of Elmo. He was designed by Ed Eyth and built by Rollie Krewson.
- Bag (performed by Rickey Boyd) – An anthropomorphic cloth bag who is Chelli's best pal. It talks in its own gibberish which the other characters appear to understand.
- Argyle and Lyle (performed by Rickey Boyd and Joey Mazzarino, 1996–1997; Jeff Conover, 1997-1998) – Two Muppet socks that are known for telling knock-knock jokes, which Lyle usually refers to as "sock-sock" jokes. When they are not hanging out in the store's sock bin, they can be found in a laundry hamper or the storeroom. Lyle speaks with a Brooklyn accent, whereas Argyle speaks with a Scottish accent.
- Sofie (performed by Alice Dinnean) – A Muppet girl who joins the cast in the second season.

Additional puppets were performed by Jeff Conover, Andy Stone, and Matt Vogel.

=== Humans ===
- Molly (portrayed by Selena Nelson) – A female human that Chelli and Bag live with.
- Kim (portrayed by Tessa Ludwick) – A human girl who is a friend of Chelli and Bag.
- Joey (portrayed by John Mountford and Adrian Smith) – A human boy who is a friend of Chelli and Bag.
- Bernard (portrayed by Cullen Douglas) – A crossing guard who asks viewers if they have their telescope or hat as preludes to the Troubles the Cat and Samuel and Nina segments.
- Trudy (portrayed by Clare Sera) – An exercise instructor.
- Martha (portrayed by Clare Sera) – A shy woman.
- Josie (portrayed by Clare Sera) – A female mail carrier who shows up to show "I did something nice today" videotapes to Chelli and Bag.
- Doc Furrball (portrayed by Cullen Douglas) – A veterinarian.
- Waldo Muckle (portrayed by Cullen Douglas) – An egotistical inventor and handyman. In "One Little Lie," it is revealed that Waldo does not swim but enjoys snorkeling.
- Neighborhood Kids (portrayed by Ashley Jones and Jamie Ryan) – The Neighborhood Kids are friends of Molly, Chelli, and Bag who occasionally appear alongside the other humans.

=== Voice cast ===
- María Conchita Alonso – Troubles the Cat ("Troubles the Cat" segments)
- Fran Brill – Nina ("Samuel and Nina" segments)
- Ashley Carin – Sarah ("Troubles the Cat" segments)
- James Spector – Ace ("Ace & Avery" segments)
- Kevin Clash – Avery ("Ace & Avery" segments)
- Allen Enlow – Samuel ("Samuel and Nina" segments)
- Pam Lewis – Little Chick ("Slim Pig" segments)
- Andrew Sachs – Narrator ("William's Wish Wellingtons" segments)
- James Spector – Slim Pig ("Slim Pig" segments)

== Animated segments ==
The scenes with Chelli and friends served as frames for a variety of individual animated segments, which were also rotated between seasons. As opposed to the shorter clips on Sesame Street, the seven animated segments ran approximately 3 to 8 minutes each and were produced by various studios in New York City, Australia, and Europe, often with consultation from Sesame Workshop and Cartoon Network (Big Bag aired back to back with Small World, another preschool series which showcased different international cartoons). The shorts included:

- Troubles the Cat – This is the first original cartoon based on Latino characters to air in the United States. It was created by then 5-year-old Marina Mendez and Karen Mendez Smith and developed for television by Nina Elias-Bamberger, Jim Martin, Marie Poe, Luis Santeiro, and Nina Shelton. The show was produced by The Ink Tank in New York, with character designs by Santiago Cohen. The group of kids includes a six-year-old Latina girl named Marina and her multicultural friends. Marina's cat Troubles (voiced by María Conchita Alonso) uses a "troublescope" to sniff out problems that develop in the group's relationships. Troubles invites home viewers to do the same, using their cardboard tubes as troublescopes "to see what the kids are really thinking and feeling". 24 episodes were made and it was the only other short, along with Koki, to be carried into the second season. It is one of the only two cartoons that originated in the show, as well as the only cartoon originated in the show that airs in both seasons of the show.
- William's Wish Wellingtons – William's magic Wellington boots make any wish come true. They're a wonderful tool to solve problems with if he can only figure out the right thing to wish for. Each story, whether it's about looking for buried treasure or William wishing himself invisible at his sister's wedding, sparks the imagination of viewers. 13 out of 26 episodes made were aired. Andrew Sachs provides the narration.
- Slim Pig – A two-dimensional pig who lives in a three-dimensional world named Slim Pig (voiced by James Spector) is a uniquely proportioned animal who can slide between the barriers that surround his farm and assume various shapes. Slim Pig demonstrates that it can be fun to explore and discover new things. Fellow farm animals like Duck, Little Chick, Rooster, Mouse and Horse admire Slim for his ability and desire to venture beyond their world. 13 out of 39 episodes made were aired.
- Koki – In this claymation segment, a four-year-old chick named Koki has a life similar to that of a preschool child. Koki is learning new responsibilities while adapting to relationships with her family and friends. Koki's younger sibling, an egg, represents a new challenge for her. 13 episodes were made. This animated series is Spanish in origin and was not originally produced specifically for Big Bag.
- Tobias Totz and His Lion – Centered around the relationship between two unlikely friends: a man named Tobias and a not-so-ferocious lion. Tobias is a retired zookeeper who is frequently asked to return to the zoo and solve problems. These shorts explore alternative solutions to difficult situations. 13 out of 25 episodes made were aired.
- Samuel and Nina – A dog alter-ego of Charlie Chaplin named Samuel (voiced by Allen Enlow) and a prudent, down-to-earth squirrel named Nina (voiced by Fran Brill) embark on adventures and help humans and creatures in distress by using their imagination. Samuel shapes his hat into a creative piece of apparel, appropriate for his role in each crisis, and prompts viewers to do the same. 13 episodes were made.

In the second season, every segment except Troubles the Cat and Koki was removed. A new segment was added:

- Ace and Avery – This segment focused on a bespectacled boy Ace (voiced by James Spector) and his raccoon sidekick Avery (voiced by Kevin Clash). This segment was the most likely to incorporate craft elements from the main storyline. 13 episodes were made. This segment was made by John R. Dilworth, who would later go on to create Courage the Cowardly Dog. Along with Troubles the Cat, it is one of the only two cartoons that originated on the show.

== Series overview ==
Season	Episodes	Air date	
Season	Episodes	First aired	Last aired
1	13	June 2, 1996	August 25, 1996
2	26	April 6, 1998	May 11, 1998

== Episodes ==
=== Season 1 (1996) ===
No. overall	No. in season	Title	Original release date
1	1	"Let's Work Together"	June 2, 1996
Molly, Chelli, and Bag unpack and get the store ready for opening day. Chelli cannot wait to make new friends, but Bag misses the choo-choo train that was near their old home. Throughout the day the neighborhood adults and children stop by to meet their new neighbors. Chelli makes friends, but the neighborhood kids get into an argument about what to make out of some cardboard boxes. The kids leave in a huff but soon return and apologize. Chelli and the kids then decide to cooperate and make something that really makes Bag happy – a cardboard choo-choo train!
2	2	"One Little Lie"	June 9, 1996
Molly obtains an old music box that has a dancing clown on it. Before she leaves the store, she tells Chelli to wait until she returns before playing it again. Chelli cannot wait and plays with it. But he breaks the music box. He then hides it. Josie comes by the store and mentions that Molly told her about her new music box. Josie asks Chelli to see it and Chelli lies and says Kim has it. Josie and Kim come back to the store to say that Kim does not have it. Then Chelli claims that the music box is with "Him" meaning Doc Furball. Chelli's lie gets bigger and bigger as the whole cast is trying to figure out who has the music box. This lasts until Molly returns upon Chelli's claims that Waldo took it for a swim. In the end, Chelli tells the truth and apologizes. Waldo ends up fixing the music box.
3	3	"Bag O' Tricks"	June 16, 1996
Chelli is having fun dressing up in disguises. Bag decides that she would like to have a disguise as well to see if she can fool people into thinking she's something she's really not. Chelli and the neighborhood kids work together to come up with a disguise for Bag. However, the disguise does not work—no one is fooled. Later that day, Molly and Kim work with Chelli to make a new disguise for Bag. This time, Bag dresses up as a chicken. Bag (a.k.a. the chicken) tries to fool Doc, but it does not work. However, Doc just happened to bring some baby chicks with him to the store and they cluster around Bag, convinced that she is their mother. Bag is happy that her disguise finally fooled someone.
4	4	"Good-Bye to Feeling Shy"	June 23, 1996
Chelli needs to bring something for show-and-tell day at school. He decides he wants to take Bag. However, Bag is too shy to stand in front of Chelli's class. Molly and Chelli try different methods to cure Bag out of his shyness. They finally succeed with a big finale that the townspeople watch.
5	5	"Birthday Bash"	June 30, 1996
It's Kim's birthday and Chelli has painted her a special painting. Kim comes by the store to show everyone her new birthday overalls. She also tries to take a peek at Chelli's painting. Chelli tries to prevent her from seeing the painting and Kim accidentally gets paint on her overalls. She blames Chelli, and Chelli says it was her fault. Kim uninvites Chelli to the birthday party that she is going to have that day. They both realize that it was an accident and decide to apologize to each other. The day ends with a big birthday party at the store.
6	6	"Key, Key, Where Can You Be?"	July 7, 1996
Molly discovers a locked wooden chest in her store, but she does not have the key. Josie comes by and tells her that the chest is filled with old toys from the previous store owner. She also mentions that the previous owner would hide keys under objects that remind her of the things she's locking up. Molly, Chelli, and the neighborhood kids set out to search for the key. They decide that the key must be hidden under a toy. They find the key with the help of Bag and the audience at home.
7	7	"The Apple Corps"	July 14, 1996
Chelli wants to spend the day telling jokes to Kim. Kim has made other plans. She is going to spend the day with the Apple Corps, a Girl/Boy Scout-type group. Feeling a bit jealous when Molly goes with the Apple Corps, Chelli decides the Apple Corps are not cool and he creates his own group called the "Supercool Incredibly Groovy Joke Squad" where they accidentally cause a mess. The Apple Corps returns to invite Chelli to help them pass out cookies to sick kids. They also help Chelli clean up the mess he and Bag had caused before he can go. Chelli decides that the Apple Corps are cool because they help people. The Apple Corps invite Chelli to join their group.
8	8	"Win, Lose or Draw"	July 21, 1996
After cleaning the store, Chelli complains that it's hard to find things, so Molly decides to decorate the store by having her friends each draw a picture of something special to them. Chelli decides to draw a picture of Bag. However, as he shows his picture to everyone, each person thinks it's a wonderful picture of something it is not. Chelli is embarrassed by his drawing. Molly teaches Chelli how to draw a better picture. After much practice, he does. At the end of the day, everyone compliments Chelli on his second picture. Molly points out that his first picture was a wonderful work of art because it allowed everyone to see what they want to see.
9	9	"The Imaginary Treasure"	July 28, 1996
Molly reads a book to Chelli, Bag, Kim, and Jamie about pirates who find a buried treasure. As Molly finishes, she discovers the last pages are missing. Everyone is disappointed because they want to find out what happens to the pirates. So Molly suggests that the kids pretend that they are the pirates. The cast spends the rest of the day looking for make-believe buried treasure and discovers that using their imagination can be very rewarding.
10	10	"My Crayons, My Crayons"	August 4, 1996
Chelli receives a new box of crayons and decides the only way to keep them new and pointy is not to share them. However, that day everyone needs to use one of Chelli's crayons. He reluctantly shares with each person but is not happy about it. At the end of the day, Chelli's new crayons are no longer fresh and pointy. Chelli, however, discovers how wonderful it is to be shared with his friends....before Bag has a new box of crayons.
11	11	"Practice, Practice"	August 11, 1996
Chelli and Kim are scheduled to learn a song on the recorder for a homework assignment. Molly shows them how to play the recorder and reminds them that they need to practice to learn how to play the song. Kim practices with the recorder, but Chelli decides he does not need to practice with the actual recorder. He thinks he can learn to play by other methods. After his way of learning fails, he discovers that practicing is the only way to master a skill.
12	12	"Piano Roll Blues"	August 18, 1996
Molly receives music rolls for her player piano. Chelli and Kim are supposed to take turns playing their favorite roll. However, when Kim puts her roll in, she forgets to take turns. She plays her song over and over again and never gives Chelli a chance to play. Chelli is very upset but is afraid to confront Kim. Instead, he tries various methods to prevent Kim from playing her song. After accidentally breaking the player piano and being talked to by Molly, Chelli finally decides to confront Kim and she apologizes. Waldo is called in to repair the player piano.
13	13	"Bringing Up Puppy"	August 25, 1996
Doc needs a dog sitter for the afternoon and Chelli volunteers for the job. After the puppy falls asleep, Chelli decides that dog sitting can be really boring. Kim and Joey come by to ask Chelli if he would like to rollerblade. Chelli knows he should not because he is supposed to be watching the puppy, but he and Bag leave anyway. When they return they discover the puppy made a mess of the store. Soon after, Doc and Molly return and express their disappointment in Chelli. Chelli apologizes and agrees to clean up the mess the puppy made.

=== Season 2 (1998) ===
No. overall	No. in season	Title	Original release date
14	1	"Join the Club!"	April 6, 1998
Chelli and Sofie disagree about club rules. Segments: Troubles the Cat: The Best Pie In Town, Koki: A Day At The Movies, Ace and Avery: The Rainy Day
15	2	"The Sock Hop"	April 7, 1998
The gang throws a sock hop to cheer homesick Argyle. Segments: Troubles the Cat: Daniel City, Koki: Papa's New Piano, Ace and Avery: Follow the Leader
16	3	"Birthday Blahs"	April 8, 1998
Chelli needs help with Sofie's last-minute birthday party when he realizes he can't do it on his own. Segments: Troubles the Cat: The Case of the Missing Coin, Koki: Crazy for Cleanin', Ace and Avery: It's My Party
17	4	"Zoom to the Zoo"	April 9, 1998
The pals use pets and imagination to create a zoo when they cannot go to a real zoo due to Molly injuring herself.
18	5	"The Showdown"	April 10, 1998
Buckaroos Sofie and Chelli have a drawing contest after Sofie gets something in the mail from her cowboy cousin.
19	6	"Elmo's Visit"	April 13, 1998
Elmo (from Sesame Street) visits Chelli, realizing they are pen-pals.
20	7	"Afraid of the Dark"	April 14, 1998
Chelli and Sofie overcome their fear of the dark after Bag accidentally causes a blackout in the store.
21	8	"Presto Change-O"	April 15, 1998
Sofie and Chelli disobey Argyle and play with his magic kit making Bag invisible by mistake.
22	9	"To See or Not to See"	April 16, 1998
Sofie dislikes her glasses.
23	10	"Giggle Cookies"	April 17, 1998
Chelli tries to get some cookies without asking, but thanks to a mishap from Bag, the "choco-lock cookies" cause whoever eats them to laugh uncontrollably.
24	11	"Royal Bag"	April 20, 1998
Sharing is discussed in this episode.
25	12	"It's Showtime"	April 21, 1998
Chelli and Sofie want to produce a play of "The Three Little Pigs", but Bag would rather pretend he is a robot. They compromise and put on a play of "The Three Evil Space Pigs", starring Sofie and the socks as the pigs, and Bag as "Robo-Wolf".
26	13	"Case of the Missing Sock"	April 22, 1998
Chelli (pretending to be Sherlock Holmes) and Bag (playing Dr. Watson) search for missing socks.
27	14	"Chelli's in Charge"	April 23, 1998
Chelli is put in charge of the store while Molly is busy. Chelli creates a new song and dance.
28	15	"Fair Play at the Country Fair"	April 24, 1998
Chelli does not like Sofie's new game.
29	16	"Bathtub Blues"	April 27, 1998
Lyle does not want to take a bath.
30	17	"Parrot Patrol"	April 28, 1998
Sofie and Chelli lose Molly's bird.
31	18	"Where's Harriet?"	April 29, 1998
Chelli plays along when Sofie introduces him to her imaginary friend, Harriet.
32	19	"Oatmeal Man"	April 30, 1998
Chelli and Sofie learn to be more careful with their words when they accidentally hurt Bag's feelings.
33	20	"You Don't Look Bluish"	May 1, 1998
Chelli, Bag, and Sofie confess after disobeying Molly's orders.
34	21	"Mrs. Everard Returns"	May 4, 1998
Mrs. Everard is going to return soon so Chelli and Bag work together to fix everything before he gets back.
35	22	"Attention Shoppers"	May 5, 1998
Bag is upset that he can't be understood over the store's new P.A. system.
36	23	"Sofie the Champ"	May 6, 1998
Sofie wins a game and becomes Sofie the Champ.
37	24	"Dr. Bag"	May 7, 1998
Bag pretends to be a doctor.
38	25	"Doing My Share"	May 8, 1998
Chelli, Sofie, and Bag do their shares.
39	26	"I Ought to be in Pictures"	May 11, 1998
Chelli, Bag and Sofie make their own movie with a camcorder.

== See also ==
- Oobi, a similar co-production connected to Sesame Street
- ITV Studios, which produced the UK version
- Tickle U, a similar co-production programming block connected to Cartoon Network
