= Father of the Pride =

American animated television series (2004–2005)

- The series' logo from the opening credits
- Genre: Animated sitcom Social satire
- Created by: Jeffrey Katzenberg
- Developed by: Jonathan Groff
- Creative director: Felix Ip
- Voices of: John Goodman; Cheryl Hines; Danielle Harris; Daryl Sabara; Carl Reiner; Orlando Jones; Julian Holloway; David Herman; John O'Hurley; Wendie Malick
- Narrated by: John Goodman ("Stage Fright")
- Opening theme: "Viva Las Vegas" performed by John Goodman
- Composers: Eban Schletter; Harry Gregson-Williams; Mark Rivers; John Dragonetti
- Country of origin: United States
- Original language: English
- No. of seasons: 1
- No. of episodes: 15 (1 unfinished and 2 unaired)

Production
- Executive producers: Jeffrey Katzenberg; Jonathan Groff; Jon Pollack; Peter Mehlman
- Producers: Mary Sandell; Ken Tsumura; Ron Weiner
- Production location: Las Vegas Valley
- Editors: Tony Mizgalski; Gian Ganziano; C. K. Horness; Harold McKenzie; Leo Papin; Jonathan Paul Ramirez
- Running time: 22 minutes
- Production companies: DreamWorks Animation; DreamWorks Television

Original release
- Network: NBC
- Release: August 31, 2004 – May 29, 2005

Father of the Pride is an American adult animated sitcom created by Jeffrey Katzenberg and produced by DreamWorks Animation for NBC.

Father of the Pride follows a family of white lions, the patriarch of which stars in a Siegfried & Roy show in Las Vegas. Despite heavy promotion and support, the series was cancelled after one season due to declining ratings. Transmission and production were also delayed by the real-life on-stage injury of Roy Horn in October 2003.

== Premise ==
The show follows the adventures of a family of white lions. The family contains Larry, the bumbling yet well-intentioned star of Siegfried & Roy's show; Kate, a pretty, stay-at-home mother who is a member of a special women's group; Sierra, their teenage daughter who is frequently annoyed by her family; Hunter, their awkward young son, who is a huge fan of The Lord of the Rings; Sarmoti, Kate's father and Sierra and Hunter's grandfather who has a dislike for Larry; and Snack, Larry's mischievous gopher friend.

Recurring characters appear alongside the lion family; these include Larry's friends Roger, Chutney, Vincent, and Nelson; Larry's rival Blake and his wife Victoria; Sarmoti's friends Bernie, Duke, Chaz, and the Snout Brothers; Hi Larious; Kate's friends Foo-Lin, Lily, and Brittany; two lesbian gophers Chimmi and Changa; and Sierra's boyfriend Justin.

== Voice cast ==
=== Major characters ===
- Larry (voiced by John Goodman) is a middle-aged white lion originally from the Bronx Zoo who becomes the star of Siegfried and Roy's show (replacing his father-in-law Sarmoti). At times, Larry tries not to speak his mind, but usually ends up exposing his true feelings. He sometimes lies to his family and friends just to impress them and that usually starts the trouble for the episode, making him feel guilty afterwards. However, Larry does not intend to cause any harm, always hoping for the best.
- Kate (voiced by Cheryl Hines) is Larry's wife, Sierra and Hunter's mother, and Sarmoti's daughter. Primarily known for her relation to Larry and Sarmoti, Kate is constantly attempting to establish her own individuality.
- Sierra (voiced by Danielle Harris) is Larry and Kate's rebellious, outgoing 16-year-old daughter, Hunter's older sister, and Sarmoti's granddaughter. Sierra is an activist with left-wing views who likes the latest things and hates doing chores. Sierra can be somewhat sassy at times (even teasing Hunter), but she genuinely loves and cares about her family.
- Hunter (voiced by Daryl Sabara) is Larry and Kate's friendly, sensitive, somewhat immature 10-year-old son, Sierra's younger brother, and Sarmoti's grandson. Hunter is always shown wearing a plastic Elizabethan collar to stop him from biting himself and is portrayed as slightly mentally deficient.
- Sarmoti (voiced by Carl Reiner) is Sierra and Hunter's grandfather, Larry's father-in-law, Kate's father, and the former star of Siegfried and Roy's show until Larry replaced him. Sarmoti has a dislike for and is jealous of Larry and is disappointed with Kate for marrying him, thinking she could have done better. His name is an acronym of "Siegfried and Roy, Masters of the Impossible".
- Snack (voiced by Orlando Jones) is a gopher and Larry's best friend. He is constantly getting into trouble with the other residents of the park. Snack believes that humans can understand him, calling himself "The Human Whisperer".
- Siegfried & Roy (respectively voiced by Julian Holloway and David Herman) are a performing duo who employ Larry in their shows. The two constantly argue, but still respect each other as friends.

=== Supporting characters ===
- Blake (voiced by John O'Hurley) is a white tiger, Larry's rival, and the Tiger Twins' father. The two groups constantly compete to be the stars of the show. Blake is a glory hound or a self-professed "whore for applause" and will stoop as low as to sabotage his competitors to get the spotlight.
- Victoria (voiced by Wendie Malick) is Blake's wife and the Tiger Twins' mother. She also competes with the lions to act with her husband in Siegfried and Roy's show. Victoria has a drinking problem and previously received two liver transplants from baboons.
- Roger (voiced by Brian Stepanek) is a Bornean orangutan and one of Larry's friends. He is a local at the Watering Hole. Roger has something of a short temper as he gets angry easily many times, being happy and cheerful one moment and then angry and disgruntled when he gets offended.
- Chutney (voiced primarily by Brian George; occasionally voiced by John Ennis) is an Indian elephant and one of Larry's friends. Through the series, the implication that he is in a gay relationship with his turkey "roommate" and that he is otherwise closeted is a running gag.
- Vincent (voiced by Don Stark) is an Italian-accented greater flamingo who has a sexual interest in sombreros. He acts tough because he is self-conscious about being pink.
- Nelson (voiced by Andy Richter) is a giant panda and one of Larry's friends. He is extremely nervous about meeting other women as he had never seen other women because he was isolated before brought into captivity by Siegfried and Roy. Initially, Nelson had a crush on Kate as she was the first woman who was kind to him, but after having some sense knocked into him by Larry, Nelson chose to be with Foo-Lin.
- Bernie (voiced by Garry Marshall) is Sarmoti's best friend and poker buddy. He is a bit of a suck up and acts like Sarmoti's assistant and yesman, constantly calling him "Boss" and agreeing with every single thing he says.
- Duke (voiced by Dom DeLuise) is an effeminate Indian leopard and one of Sarmoti's poker buddies. He makes subtle but obvious allusions to his homosexuality, to which his buddies are oblivious.
- Chaz (voiced by Rocky Carroll) is a black panther and one of Sarmoti's poker buddies.
- The Snout Brothers (voiced by John DiMaggio) are a pair of steroid-abusing common warthogs who are old friends of Sarmoti. They are right winged and homophobic.
- Hi Larious (voiced by Dana Gould) is a great grey slug comedian who is not very funny (though he tries to be). Whenever he tells jokes, he presses a red button and a beat is heard and the person listening to the joke usually doesn't laugh.
- Foo-Lin (voiced by Lisa Kudrow) is a giant panda who is one of Kate's friends. She constantly looks to Kate for comfort and finds Sarmoti's jokes about her mental state humorous instead of insulting. She later finds peace with herself and becomes Nelson's girlfriend.
- Lily (voiced by Jane Lynch) is the leader of a women's empowerment group and one of Kate's friends. She encourages the compound's women to find the goddess within themselves.
- Brittany (voiced by Julia Sweeney) is a common warthog sow and one of Kate's friends.
- Tommy (voiced by David Spade) is a wise-cracking northeastern coyote who "guides" Larry and Sarmoti when they meet him in "Road Trip".
- Emerson (voiced by Danny DeVito) is an activist American lobster who befriends Sierra in "And the Revolution Continues", much to Larry's dismay. He is kind to Sierra, but is mean to Larry. Like Sierra, Emerson is a left-wing activist.
- Tom (voiced by John DiMaggio) is an Thomson's gazelle who is an alcoholic, verbally abusive adulterer and often tries to pick fights after he has had a few drinks. He has a girlfriend and a son named Anthony, who picks on Hunter. He has a severe drinking problem and is usually seen with a bottle in his hooves.
- Anthony (voiced by Cheryl Holliday) is a Thompson's gazelle and school bully. He picks on Hunter, though Hunter once stood up to him in "Possession". Like his father, Anthony is mean and selfish. He is only seen picking on Hunter, beating him up and calling him names.
- Justin (voiced by Pauly Shore) is a Jewish adolescent lion with a mop-top haircut. He is Sierra's boyfriend and an aggressive (but unskilled) poker player.
- Chimi and Changa (voiced by Tress MacNeille) are a pair of lesbian (or possibly bisexual) "fiesta babe" gophers Snack hires to promote "Larry's Debut All-Night Fiesta".
- Edna (voiced by Kathryn Joosten) is a lioness with a lisp who is the teacher of the "Gifted And Talented Class" of the compound's school.
- Donkey (voiced by Eddie Murphy) is a lead character originating from the Shrek franchise. He visits the compound in the episode "Donkey" and is known as a massive star by all of the animals.
- Kelsey Grammer (voiced by himself) is a stand-up comedian and actor whom Siegfried and Roy take Larry to see in the revised pilot. Siegfried and Roy think that Grammer is a real psychologist, so Roy explains his lifelong problems and hard relationship with his father.

== Episodes ==
| No. | Title | Directed by | Written by | Original release date | Viewers (millions) |
|---|---|---|---|---|---|
| 1 | "Original Pilot" | John Stevenson | Jonathan Groff | Unaired | N/A |
When Sarmoti accidentally makes a mistake on the show while trying to improve his act, making him to lose his position as league lion, Siegfried and Roy decide it is time for him to retire. Larry and Kate do not know how to tell Sarmoti that he has been replaced. Larry asks Snack to help him and they visit Siegfried and Roy to try and convince them to keep Sarmoti in the show as the star. However, things go wrong and Larry becomes the lead lion after saving Roy. Later, after Larry finally tells Sarmoti he got fired, the two start fighting with each other, Siegfried and Roy decide to move him in with Larry and Kate as they mistake Larry and Sarmoti's fighting as love, much to Larry and Sarmoti's horror and dismay. Note: This episode wasn't aired on U.S. television. The plot was told in "Stage Fright", using the pilot footage as flashbacks.
| 2 | "Sarmoti Moves In" | Mark Risley | Cheryl Holliday | December 28, 2004 | 4.68 |
Sarmoti is moving into Larry and Kate's place, and he brings his stuffed zebra from Africa. After a while, they both get annoyed and frustrated with him. Finally, Kate snaps and tears up her father's zebra rug without thinking in a furious rage. When she realizes what she has done, she and Larry go to the Watering Hole in order to find a new zebra. Meanwhile, Snack throws a party at Chutney's place and he finds out and wants Snack to pay for the damages. Snack makes a behind the scenes movie of Vegas in order to make money. Larry and Kate invite a zebra named Kevin back to their place, but they could not go through with Larry's plan of killing him.
| 3 | "Catnip and Trust" | John Holmquist | Robert Cohen | September 14, 2004 | 9.66 |
Larry and Kate are concerned about Sierra's education and want to get her into a private school. They find catnip in Sierra's bedroom and confront her about it; Sierra rejects that it is hers, but they do not believe her. In spite of this, she sneaks out of the house and goes to the rave. Larry and Kate try to find her and go to the rave where they eat some "catnip" sausages. Returning home, they soon feel the effects of the catnip. An interviewer from the private school named Edna Falvey comes to the house. Afterwards, it is revealed that the catnip belongs to Sarmoti and Larry and Kate reestablish their trust in Sierra and she announces that a guy named Dean (whom she had been seeing since she sneaked out) is taking her camping, but each will have their own sleeping bags and he is bringing his children.
| 4 | "What's Black, White and Depressed All Over?" | Bret Haaland | Peter Mehlman | August 31, 2004 | 12.39 |
In a quest to make a new panda breeding program, Siegfried and Roy import a male panda named Nelson. Larry and Kate try to set him up with Kate's romantically challenged friend Foo-Lin. However, things go wrong when Kate comforts Nelson and he falls in love with her. Sick of it all, Sarmoti sets them straight.
| 5 | "Larry's Debut and Sweet Darryl Hannah Too" | Bret Haaland | Ron Weiner | September 7, 2004 | 9.89 |
Larry is looking forward for his debut on the show, but when he finds out he will be performing on live television, he gets nervous. Sarmoti tries to help him out because ever since he made a mistake on television, Siegfried and Roy have used Blake on their television spots. Unfortunately, Larry fails to perform the trick Siegfried and Roy have prepared. So Siegfried and Roy decide to use Blake instead. Meanwhile, Sarmoti continues to watch his mistake on the tape he has, in which he was a younger adult. However, he notices that Blake as a cub tripped him. He then investigates and finds out that Blake foiled Larry's attempt earlier, bribing a snail named Hi to stick his shell into the gears of the trick to freeze up the entire mechanics so the trick wouldn't work. Larry and Sarmoti begin to plan their revenge on Blake.
| 6 | "And the Revolution Continues" | Mark Baldo & Mark Risley | Vanessa McCarthy | September 28, 2004 | 8.12 |
Larry, Kate and Sierra go with Siegfried and Roy to a restaurant. There, Sierra meets a lobster named Emerson who is political and an environmentalist like her. Larry takes Emerson and brings him home in order to make Sierra like him again and they start making protest signs and whatnot. Siegfried and Roy are looking forward to the arrival of Barbra Streisand. Emerson starts a rally and one night, the chanting they are making in the house wakes Larry up. He says "enough" and decides to throw Emerson out. Meanwhile, Kate is making Sarmoti hang out with Hunter, but he doesn't really want to. When his girlfriend is about to leave him, he makes up a lie that he takes care of Hunter and that Hunter's parents ran off. Larry and Sierra throw Emerson in the Mirage aquarium, but when Barbra Streisand sees him in there, she demands to have him for dinner. Larry and Snack make a plan to save Emerson as Siegfried and Roy are bringing Larry to meet Barbra. He saves Emerson after a fight with Barbra and they quickly leave. On their way home, when Emerson won't thank Larry, Sierra realizes how arrogant and selfish he really is and throws him down a drain in anger. The next morning, Sarmoti is forced to be Gandalf during one of Hunter's The Lord of the Rings play scenes.
| 7 | "The Thanksgiving Episode" | John Puglisi | David R. Goodman & Glasgow Phillips | December 28, 2004 | 5.21 |
Kate wants to become PTA president but when she accidentally says that all of the turkeys look alike, everyone thinks she's a racist. Larry decides to invite the turkeys over for dinner for their anti-Thanksgiving feast that they have. Sarmoti has no respect for the turkeys and when his grandfather's pocket watch goes missing he blames them. Meanwhile, Snack is caught sneaking around Siegfried and Roy's place and Roy makes him his new pet, naming him "Heimlich". The dinner is going good until Victoria, who is running opposite Kate for PTA president, throws a big party. All of the turkeys leave their place and go to the party. Snack is enjoying being Roy's new pet, but when he finds a rabbit eating in the kitchen who says he is Roy's new pet, Snack gets upset and leaves. When election day comes, Larry and Kate find out that a turkey actually did take Sarmoti's watch. Kate goes on with the election but can't take it anymore and tells everyone that Stan the turkey stole her father's watch. The turkeys are actually happy that Kate said something because Stan has been ripping people off for years; so everyone votes for Kate as president.
| 8 | "One Man's Meat is Another Man's Girlfriend" | Steve Hickner & Mike de Seve | Mike Barker & Matt Weitzman | October 26, 2004 | 6.64 |
Siegfried and Roy put Larry on a diet; no meat. Larry starts to hallucinate, people and items turn into food - including Snack's new girlfriend Candy. Candy dumps Snack without telling him; instead, she tells Larry. Snack returns and believes that due to his diet Larry had eaten her; Larry does the honorable thing and tells Snack that he had eaten her in order to spare his feelings. Sierra and Sarmoti play a game of poker.
| 9 | "Donkey" | Bret Haaland | Ron Weiner | September 21, 2004 | 9.51 |
This episode is a cross-over episode with Shrek. The character "Donkey" is in town filming a commercial and all the animals in the enclosure come out to see him. Career day is coming up and Hunter doesn't want his dad to come to school, however he comes into school and says that he knows Donkey in order to make himself sound cool. Larry confronts Donkey and asks him to visits Hunter's school, but his manager declines. Later, Larry, Sarmoti, and Snack kidnap Donkey's stunt double, mistaking him for Donkey. Larry takes Donkey's stunt double to the school, which turns out to be a disaster once the kids find out. Donkey makes an appearance saving the day and reputation of Larry and Hunter. Siegfried and Roy file a complaint with the Bed and Breakfast that has replaced the Applebees. They stage a protest against the Bed and Breakfast, which leads to Siegfried having sex with the owner. They take it over and turn it into a casino, "saving" Las Vegas.
| 10 | "Possession" | John Wayne Stevenson | Ron Weiner | October 12, 2004 | 8.42 |
Larry is against going to the tigers' party; however, Kate convinces him to go after she talks about the relationship. Hunter is listening to "suicidal" music. Kate and Larry arrive at the party only to have the tigers brag about their home. Kate gets upset after Larry refuses to try new things. Sarmoti sees Hunter being picked on by an antelope, so he teaches Hunter how to be a lion warrior. Larry steals the tigers' television in order to surprise Kate, which pleases her after the tigers visit the house. Hunter and the antelope fight with help from Sarmoti's training. Hunter becomes trance-like and begins to attack the other animals. The tigers hold a neighborhood watch meeting and make Larry the head of the council. Kate and Larry continue to steal more items. Siegfried and Roy leave Kate and Larry a gift and the neighborhood watch team finds the television.
| 11 | "Road Trip" | Steve Hickner & Mark Risley | Jon Pollack | December 28, 2004 | 4.71 |
The episode opens with the caption "Kate and Larry's Anniversary One Year Ago." Larry brings home a Jimi Hendrix wig for Kate as he had forgotten about the anniversary; he promises that he would never forget the anniversary again. One year later, Larry holds a party in honor of Jimi Hendrix and leaves Kate a note asking her to meet him at the Watering Hole, where the party is taking place. Larry soon remembers about the anniversary and gets home quickly to apologize. Kate leaves with Siegfried and Roy and goes to Little Bavaria while Larry tries to escape the compound. Sarmoti shows Larry an escape hole and they both leave the compound. Meanwhile, Siegfried and Roy host a party for the lions, tigers, and cheetahs. Kate talks to a jaguar and parties with him. Larry hires a coyote named Tommy to help find the way to Little Bavaria, which turns out to be a disaster as Tommy loses the way. The three accidental stumble across a venomous snake nest; Sarmoti is bitten and Larry has to suck out the poison. The three find their way to Little Bavaria (while Tommy is briefly taken in by Roy) and Larry and Kate make up. Note: This was the last episode broadcast on U.S. television.
| 12 | "Rehabilitation" | Mark Risley | Jon Ross | December 21, 2004 | 6.16 |
After a show Larry complains that he is not spending enough time with Kate and the family; Siegfried and Roy push Larry too hard and he injures himself during practice. Afterwards, Larry confesses to Snack that he has been faking his injuries. Sarmoti eats some of Larry's painkillers and it changes his mood for the better. Snack eats the rest of the painkillers and Sarmoti's mood returns to bad. Larry returns to the medical center and steals more of the medicated meatballs, Sarmoti discovers what Larry is doing and fights with him in the medical center. Siegfried and Roy think that the two lions have problems with drugs so they take the lions to a rehab center. In the center, Siegfried and Roy open a bottle of wine, which attracts the attention of recovering alcoholics. Larry and Sarmoti return home and Larry apologizes for what he said during their time in rehab and Sarmoti is finally able to forgive him.
| 13 | "Stage Fright" | John Holmquist & John Wayne Stevenson | Jonathan Groff | May 22, 2005 (UK); Unaired (US) | N/A |
When Larry gets stage fright during one of Siegfried and Roy's shows, they take him to see Kelsey Grammer, thinking he is a real therapist like his character on Frasier. When Roy ends up talking to Grammer about his childhood troubles with his father instead, Grammer's cat steps up to act as Larry's therapist. While talking to the cat, Larry describes the events of the original pilot episode and his thoughts about them, with relevant scenes from the pilot playing during these sequences. In the end, the cat helps him to realize that he does like being the star of the show, and that he has only been getting "stage fright" because he feels bad about liking it since in becoming the lead, he took the part away from Sarmoti. The next time Siegfried and Roy do a show, Larry accepts his position and his feelings about it, and no longer has stage fright. Note: This episode wasn't aired on U.S. television.
| 14 | "The Siegfried and Roy Fantasy Experience Movie" | Bret Haaland & John Wayne Stevenson | David R. Goodman & Glasgow Phillips | May 29, 2005 (UK); Unaired (US) | N/A |
Siegfried and Roy declare a Code Red emergency as a bulb has gone out on one of their billboards. The two discover that there is another magician in Vegas. Larry hosts a party with his friends to watch a movie. Kate goes out. Siegfried and Roy make a plan to watch these new magicians and go undercover. Kate and Foo-Lin go out to a woman's group. Meanwhile, Larry has his own emergency when he cannot find the remote control for the TV. Siegfried and Roy re-invent themselves by making a movie and hire the director, Martin Scorsese. The next night Kate re-visits the group in order to become more in contact with her hunting skills. Siegfried and Roy are filming their movie and fire the director due to creative differences; Roy decides to direct the movie. Kate's class continues and she is learning more and more about being an individual. Siegfried begins to find fault with the new director and costumes. He leaves the set and Roy must find a new actor to play the role. Kate can't spend time with Larry and laughs at him when he tells Kate that she cannot go. Siegfried auditions for the role of Siegfried in the movie. Larry confronts the women's group and tells the women to give his wife back. Kate ensures Larry that she still loves him although she is growing as a person. Note: This episode wasn't aired on U.S. television.
| 15 | "The Lost Tale" | John Holmquist & John Wayne Stevenson | Jonathan Groff | Unaired | N/A |
Siegfried and Roy are having a sculpture made of them out of cheese. Siegfried and Roy are sad that they cannot remember if they had done the show or not, so they decide to change it. It is Hunter's 10th birthday party and Kate is displeased by Larry's efforts at planning the party. Larry buys the children rum cake. Jessica Simpson agrees to appear in Siegfried and Roy's show with her own film crew, M.T.V., B.E.T. and Shanghai Live. Siegfried and Roy decide to build a 100 foot tall robot of Jessica Simpson and make it the centre of their show. Sarmoti's date complains about paying the bill and she is confronted by the leader of Kate's women's group. Larry gives Hunter a special birthday gift. Jessica questions Siegfried and Roy's "secret" garden and they question keeping her in the act. Snack gets Larry a "dog" which he refuses as it is a rat. Siegfried and Roy confront a helicopter driver when he trespasses on their property. Hunter is practicing for when he gets a puppy; Larry returns home with Jessica Simpson's dog. Jessica Simpson finds out that her dog is missing and blames the lions. Siegfried and Roy are discouraged after Jessica Simpson drops out of the show. However, they still have time to get her back. Larry tells Hunter that his dog is stolen and that it has to go back. Jessica allows the robot to be used. Note: This episode was never broadcast on U.S. television nor animated. It appears on the DVD as story-boarded with sound.

== Development ==
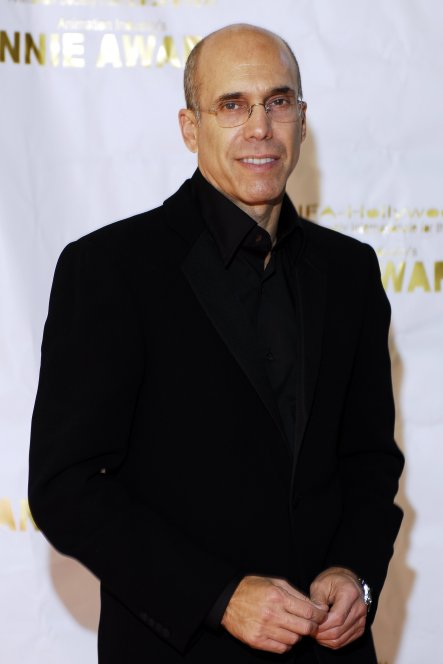
Jeffrey Katzenberg (pictured) is the creator of the series.

More than 200 animators worked on Father of the Pride for two years. Computer animation was produced at Imagi Animation Studios in Hong Kong.

The series employed a small group of seasoned directors, which included Mark Risley, Bret Haaland, Steve Hickner, John Holmquist, John Stevenson, and Mark Baldo. Felix Ip served as creative director for Imagi. For the first season, DreamWorks created 30 principal sets, 500 special props, and about 100 characters. In fact, a typical episode unfolds across all 30 principal sets and features two or three unique locations as well. The lion habitat is inspired by the real Secret Garden in Las Vegas, where the actual Siegfried & Roy lions reside. In Father of the Pride, the Secret Garden encompasses residences for the main characters and their families and public areas ranging from the community bar to a school classroom.

Since Larry and his family drive the story lines for most of the episodes, their residence is the most detailed, comprising separate, contiguous sets for the living room, the kitchen, and the children's bedrooms. Meanwhile, the assets are stored in individual files in order to be loaded into separate layers and assembled modularly.

=== Production ===
In 2002, Jeffrey Katzenberg came up with the idea for the series when he visited Siegfried & Roy's show in Las Vegas: "I thought, I wonder what it's like for those lions. What must life be like from their point of view? [They're] living in Las Vegas, trying to raise a family and earn a living. In animation, we look for those things — a way to look at our lives through a fantasy world. It allows us to take on subjects that are too difficult to do with real people. It allows us to be more controversial. Edgier. There can be parody and innuendo and satire. Things can be sophisticated in a way that even our feature films can't be."

According to Katzenberg, the series was created for "an 18- to 49-year-old. It's not about checking to make sure you don't leave the 6-, 7- and 8-year-olds behind. This is purely an adult show."

Each episode cost an estimated $2 million to $2.5 million to produce, making it at the time of its release one of the most expensive half-hour television comedies ever.

Long before its broadcast, the series was nearly cancelled, following the near-death of Roy Horn in October 2003; but after his condition improved, Siegfried & Roy urged NBC to continue production. Katzenberg recalled, "There was a short period of time where we all just rocked out on our heels and couldn't be particularly creative and certainly not very funny. But Siegfried kept saying, every step of the way, that this show meant so much to them. So much to Roy. Then, even more than it ever did."

=== Opening sequence ===
The opening sequence starts off with a red sports car, with the Nevada license plate "MAGIC1", being driven by Siegfried and Roy past many of the attractions in Las Vegas. Cast names are presented on the marquees of the Strip hotels that, along with the Mirage, belonged to the MGM / Mirage Group at the time, before the car swerves into the Mirage Hotel. The scene then changes to the lions' house. Larry gets woken up by his wife Kate, late for his performance, on the couch before dashing towards the stage (but not before having a beer given to him by Snack at the Watering Hole). Larry sings a rendition of Elvis Presley's "Viva Las Vegas" as the background music throughout the title sequence.

== Release and reception ==
The series' debut on NBC on August 31, 2004 attracted 12.3 million viewers, making it the most-watched series of the week on American television. However, the series was expected to improve, especially considering heavy promotion during NBC's coverage of the 2004 Summer Olympics in Athens, Greece. Its opening ranked only the 13th of 16 fall comedies that NBC introduced since 1999.

When the series debuted, it was positively received with strong ratings. The ratings continued to show promise through early September 2004 before declining quickly. A few airings were preempted due to the 2004 presidential election. By November 2004, it was pulled from NBC's sweeps line-up. In early December, Jeffrey Katzenberg announced that he did not think the series would be picked up for a second season. A few of the remaining episodes were burned off in late December 2004 and the series was not renewed for a second season.

Father of the Pride received a negative response from television critics, who considered it to be little more than a gimmick and a shill for other NBC and DreamWorks properties (two early episodes extensively featured The Today Show's Matt Lauer and another featured Donkey from the Shrek franchise). Also, many television critics noticed that the series' humor was very similar to South Park (one episode even had a character say, "Screw you guys, I'm goin' home!").

According to Katzenberg, Siegfried & Roy's reactions were more positive: "They laughed. A lot. They kept asking us to create more contradiction. Literally, one's blond and one's dark, and every aspect of their life is as black and white as that. They are always playful with one another, always playing tricks on one another. They encouraged us to have fun with that."

=== Protest from the Parents Television Council ===
In October 2004, the Parents Television Council's launched a campaign against Father of the Pride. Reasons cited for their opposition were the use of anthropomorphic animals and the use of "from the creators of Shrek" in their promotions. The film in question was seen by the council as much more family-friendly than this series, which the PTC stated could inadvertently draw the wrong audience based on the way it was promoted by NBC. Their campaign led to over 11,000 complaints to the Federal Communications Commission. In March 2006, the FCC ruled that the show was not indecent.

=== Awards and nominations ===
Father of the Pride won an Annie Award in 2005 for Character Design in an Animated Television Production. It was also nominated for a 2005 People's Choice Award in the category Favorite New TV Comedy Series.

=== Broadcast ===
Father of the Pride premiered in the United States on August 31, 2004, on NBC.

In the United Kingdom, the series premiered on March 6, 2005 on Sky One.

In Canada, the series premiered on September 5, 2008, on Teletoon Detour.

=== Home media ===
Father of the Pride was released on DVD on June 7, 2005. The DVD features the original pilot, an alternate pilot (which draws heavily on the original), a pair of unaired episodes, and one episode that was voice-recorded and not animated (and therefore, remains at the storyboard stage).

The series has previously been available on Netflix from the 2010s to September 2016. Since July 15, 2020, the series became available for free on Peacock with its launch.

== See also ==
- List of television shows set in Las Vegas
- List of television shows notable for negative reception
