= Mark Risley =

American screenwriter

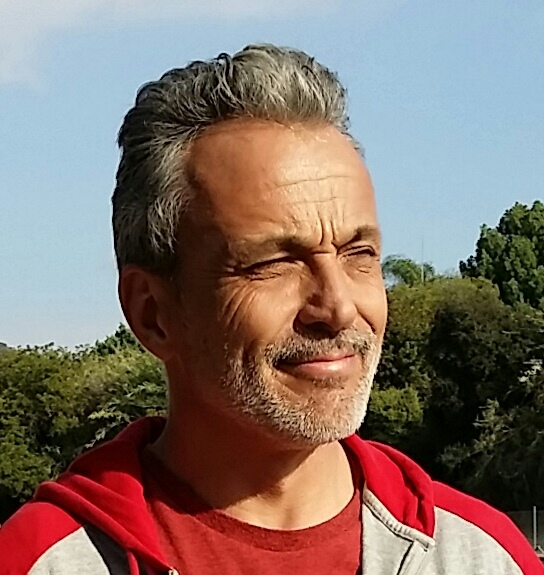
- Born: San Diego, California
- Occupations: Producer, director, writer, storyboard artist, animator, casting and voice director
- Years active: 1990–present

Mark Risley is an American writer, animator, storyboard artist, producer and director specializing in children's television. He is best known for his work on Rugrats, The Wild Thornberrys, The Mr. Men Show, Space Racers, and Yo-kai Watch.

== Career ==
Risley began his career as an animator on several television programs including Attack of the Killer Tomatoes, Gladiators 2000 and the CBS Prime-time special The Magic Paintbrush. Later he worked in the story department on the Kids' Choice Awards winning film The Rugrats Movie, then moved on to produce and direct Rugrats, The Wild Thornberrys (1998), Rocket Power (1999), and As Told by Ginger (2000–2004) for Nickelodeon and Klasky Csupo.

After directing selected sequences of the theatrical feature, The Wild Thornberrys Movie (2002) Risley went to DreamWorks Animation where he directed Father of the Pride for NBC television.

His credits also include Nickelodeon's Tak and the Power of Juju, Cartoon Network's The Mr. Men Show, Disney's Pixie Hollow Games, NFL Rush Zone, PBS Kids' Space Racers (which won the 2015 American Public Television award for Excellence in Broadcasting) and the anime television series Yo-kai Watch.

He is currently directing the film Fairest of Them All for Rokit Pictures.

== Awards and nominations ==
Daytime Emmy Awards

- 2001, The Wild Thornberrys, "Outstanding Children's Animated Program"
- 2003, Rugrats, "Outstanding Children's Animated Program"

Emmy Awards

- 2001, As Told by Ginger, "Outstanding Animated Program (For Programming Less Than One Hour)"
- 2002, As Told by Ginger, "Outstanding Animated Program (For Programming Less Than One Hour)"
- 2003, As Told by Ginger, "Outstanding Animated Program (For Programming Less Than One Hour)"

American Public Television Award

- 2014 Space Racers, "Excellence in Broadcasting"

People's Choice Awards

- 2005, Father of the Pride, Favorite New TV Comedy Program

Genesis Awards

- 2000, "The Wild Thornberrys, "Outstanding Children's Program (animated)"

Annecy Awards

- 2002 As Told by Ginger episode And She Was Gone, "Outstanding Direction (For Programming Less Than One Hour)"

Banff Rockie Awards

- 2001 As Told by Ginger episode "Hello Stranger", "Best Animation Program"

American Public Television Excellence in Broadcasting

- 2014, Space Racers, Best New Preschool Program

Cynopsis Award

- 2015, Space Racers, Best New Animated Preschool Program
