= Allan Neuwirth =

American screenwriter, producer, author, designer and cartoonist (born 1956)

Allan Charles Neuwirth
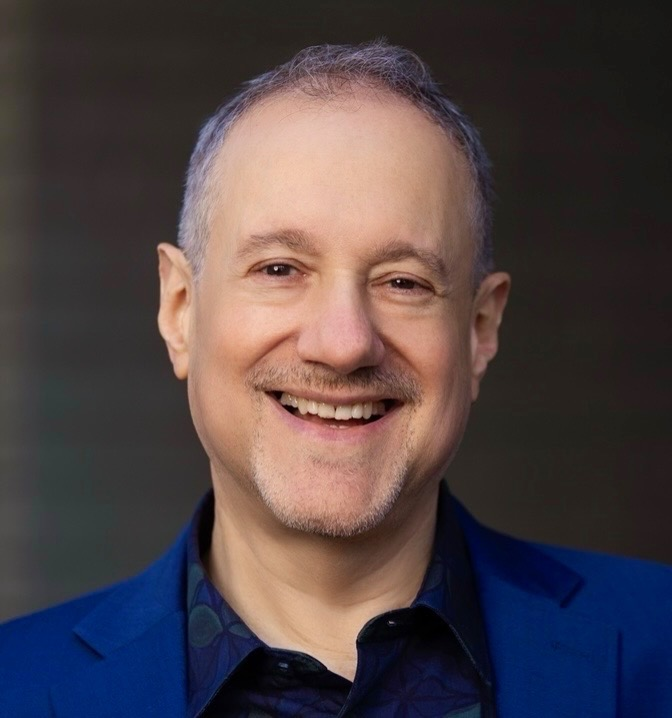
- Photo by David Seth Cohen
- Born: 1956 (age 69–70); Washington Heights, Manhattan, New York
- Education: Pratt Institute
- Occupations: Screenwriter, producer, author, designer, cartoonist
- Notable work: Makin' Toons, They'll Never Put That On The Air, Chelsea Boys, Space Racers, The Octonauts, Courage the Cowardly Dog, Drawing Home
- Awards: Prix Jeunesse; New York Film Festival Award

Allan Charles Neuwirth (born 1956) is an American screenwriter, producer, author, designer, and cartoonist known for his work in film, television, print, and as co-creator of the syndicated comic strip Chelsea Boys.

== Early life ==
Neuwirth was born in Washington Heights, New York City, and raised in Manhattan, New Jersey, and Brooklyn. His mother, Bella Neuwirth (née Gajzt), born in Lublin but raised from infancy in Antwerp, Belgium, was a Holocaust survivor of the Auschwitz-Birkenau camps. His father, David Neuwirth, was a Jew from Cologne, Germany who fled the Nazi regime, escaping to the United States with most of his siblings. He has a younger sister. Neuwirth earned a Bachelor of Fine Arts degree in Communications Design in 1986 from Pratt Institute.

== Career ==
=== Early career ===
Neuwirth began his career as a staff artist in an ad agency, Carluth Studios, where he prepared print ads for United Artists feature films. As a freelancer, he drew editorial cartoons, illustrated magazine articles and animatics for TV commercials, designed posters for New York City's Phoenix Theatre's 1981–1982 season.

=== Television and film ===
In 1979 through 1983, Neuwirth worked at The Studios of Diamond & Diaferia, an animation film production company. As a staff designer and director he created show openings, logos and motion graphics for television series including ABC News Nightline, This Week with David Brinkley, 20/20, ABC News Closeup, The Today Show and the ESPN network. After leaving Diamond & Diaferia, Neuwirth served as Art Director for all five seasons of the Lifetime Television Network series about parenting, Mother's Day, hosted by Joan Lunden.

In 1984, Neuwirth wrote jokes for television host Regis Philbin's nightclub act. Partnering with comedy writer Gary Cooper, Neuwirth continued to write material for Philbin's shows at supper clubs and hotel casinos. During this period, he also launched an independent production company, Neuwirth Design. For the next several years, Neuwirth produced TV commercials, created animated scoreboard graphics for the New York Yankees' 1986 and 1987 seasons, animated the special effects sequences for Troma Entertainment’s feature film, Sgt. Kabukiman N.Y.P.D. (1990), designed opening titles for TV movies including King's Ransom, and continued to partner with Cooper writing film scripts.

In 1995, Neuwirth and Cooper were hired by veteran children's television producer Nina Elias-Bamberger to co-develop Big Bag a puppet/animated TV series co-produced by The Jim Henson Company and Sesame Workshop. The show aired on Cartoon Network from 1996 to 1998. Neuwirth and Cooper stayed on to associate produce, story edit and write many of the series’ animated shorts. Their claymation Koki cartoons for Big Bag were featured in the Sixth International Children's Television Festival at The Museum of TV & Radio (1997), and won Prix Jeunesse and New York Film Festival awards.

The pair continued to write episodic television shows including The Wubbulous World of Dr. Seuss (their script Mystery of Winna-Bango Falls was nominated for a 1998 Writers Guild Award), Courage the Cowardly Dog, Gadget & the Gadgetinis, Dragon Tales and season two of Fix and Foxi, a European cartoon series based on Rolf Kauka’s popular comic books, during which they served as head writers. In the summer of 2001, Neuwirth relocated to Sydney, Australia for several months to continue as supervising producer of the show, overseeing post-production.

In 2002, Neuwirth embarked on a solo writing and producing career. His credits include scripts for Paramount+’s reboot of Rugrats (2021), head writing Season 6 of Nickelodeon’s Bubble Guppies (2021), developing, executive producing and story editing The Bug Diaries (2019) on Amazon Prime, developing, head writing and producing two seasons of Space Racers (2014), an award-winning animated TV series^{[25]} created with the participation of NASA and airing on PBS Kids, Universal Kids, Netflix and Amazon Prime, scripting and story editing The Octonauts (2010), and writing episodes of Arthur (2008), including "Is That Kosher?", in which he created the character "Bubbe" for guest star Joan Rivers.

Additional writing credits include scripts for Weather Hunters (2025), Donkey Hodie (2021), Chico Bon Bon: Monkey with a Tool Belt (2020), Tumble Leaf (2015), Tickety Toc (2014), Jelly Jamm (2011), Cyberchase (2010), Jungle Junction (2009), Martha Speaks (2009), Speed Racer: The Next Generation (2009), Between the Lions (2009), WordWorld (2007), and scripts and songs for Mama Mirabelle's Home Movies (2006).

In 2004, he began directing a feature-length musical documentary, What's the Name of the Dame?, which was completed seven years later. The film, which examined the fusion of two modern cultural phenomena, ABBA songs and the art of drag, made its debut at the Atlanta Film Festival in March 2011. It was subsequently selected by numerous festivals across the US, including New York's Newfest, and Canada.

In 2012, Neuwirth and Margarethe Baillou of M.Y.R.A. Entertainment teamed up to begin producing together. Their first project, the independent feature film Drawing Home, was released theatrically in 2017.^{[42]} He and Baillou also collaborated in 2016 as executive producers on Change in the Air (2018), and on director Luca Guadagnino's acclaimed indie film Call Me by Your Name, which premiered to raves at the Sundance Film Festival and was released by Sony Pictures Classics for release in 2017, winning an Academy Award and a BAFTA Award, both for Best Adapted Screenplay. Neuwirth served as associate producer.

Other projects currently filming and/or in development include the political documentary feature State of Dispute, dramatic limited TV series The Yank and Shadow Cast, and a feature film, Boy From Berlin, inspired by the young gay Jewish WWII hero Gad Beck's memoir An Underground Life.

Throughout his involvement in feature films, Neuwirth continued to work in animated television as an artist and writer. He drew storyboards for commercials and TV series, including Cartoon Network's Courage the Cowardly Dog. In 2011, he wrote the Hallmark Channel’s stop-motion Christmas special, Jingle All the Way, In 2012, he wrote the screenplay for the sequel, Jingle & Bell’s Christmas Star, and the animated short film Polariffic (2014), also for the Hallmark Channel. Polariffic was nominated for Best Animated Special Production at the 42nd Annual Annie Awards, and selected by the 2015 Annecy Film Festival. Neuwirth was nominated for a Daytime Emmy Award for "Outstanding Writing in an Animated Program," for a 2014 episode of Cyberchase. In 2025, he completed Flower of the Dawn, a 39-minute independent animated short feature that he co-created, produced, scripted and co-wrote the songs for, featuring the voices of Mel Brooks, Jane Lynch, Matt Lucas, Lilla Crawford, Griffin Puatu, and Broadway legend Jennifer Holliday. The film was selected by the 2025 Soho International Film Festival to make its world premiere.

=== Chelsea Boys ===
In 1998, Neuwirth teamed with artist/writer Glen Hanson to create the internationally syndicated comic strip Chelsea Boys. Two book collections were published: Chelsea Boys (2003), nominated for Best Humor Book by the 2004 Lambda Literary Awards, and Chelsea Boys Steppin’ Out (2007). Chelsea Boys was optioned for television several times, notably in 2001 by Hollywood film company Film Roman, producers of The Simpsons. Hanson and Neuwirth signed a deal in 2005 with MTV's new Logo Network to develop a TV show based on the comic strip, but after several months of development the network declined to move forward, citing budget concerns. As of 2015, the strip has not been animated. Chelsea Boys has appeared in anthologies, including What's Wrong: Explicit Graphic Interpretations Against Censorship (2002).

Hanson and Neuwirth also collaborated on projects for DC Comics. They co-scripted the RealWorlds graphic novel Wonder Woman vs. The Red Menace (2000).

=== Books and journalism ===
Following the attack in New York City of September 11, 2001, Neuwirth took a hiatus from television work and began writing non-fiction books and articles about the entertainment industry. His first book, Makin’ Toons (2003), offered an insider's look at the creation of the most popular animated TV shows and movies being developed in the early 1990s.

Neuwirth's next book, an oral history titled They'll Never Put That On The Air (2006), focused on the role of TV comedy in breaking down television's restrictive taboos of the 1950s and 1960s. Entertainment Weekly magazine placed the book on their "Must List." Throughout the decade, Neuwirth contributed articles about pop culture and cartoons to various entertainment industry publications, including Animation Magazine and Emmy Magazine.

Several picture books adapted from original scripts Neuwirth wrote for TV series have been published, including Martha Speaks: A Pup's Tale (2010). As a book illustrator, his credits include Warner Books' Joan Lunden's Mothers' Minutes (1986), and Golden Books’ Where in America is Carmen Sandiego? (1992).

Neuwirth has guest lectured at schools and universities, and appeared on talk radio, TV and other venues to discuss creating animation, television comedy, and comics. He has participated in and moderated panels at MoCCA, City University of New York (CUNY) School of Visual Arts, and in museums and bookstores.

For the Archive of American Television, Neuwirth has conducted videotaped interviews with figures in television history such as Joan Rivers, Dominick Dunne, and sex therapist Ruth Westheimer ("Dr. Ruth"). He has also interviewed directors and performers on stage, including British comic and actor Ricky Gervais, for BAFTA-New York screenings.

== Filmography ==
=== Film ===
| Year | Film | Role | Notes |
|---|---|---|---|
| 2009 | What's the Name of the Dame? | Director Producer | |
| 2016 | Drawing Home | Producer | |
| 2017 | Call Me by Your Name | Associate Producer | |
| 2018 | Change in the Air | Executive Producer | |

=== Television ===
| Year | Series | Role | Notes |
|---|---|---|---|
| 1996–98 | Big Bag | Developer Animation Head Writer Story Editor Writer Associate Producer | developed 29 episodes wrote 39 episodes |
| 1997 | The Wubbulous World of Dr. Seuss | Writer Lyricist | wrote 1 episode |
| 1999 | Dragon Tales | Executive Script Consultant | 1 episode |
| 2002 | Courage the Cowardly Dog | Writer | 3 episodes |
| 2002 | Fix & Foxi and Friends | Head Writer Supervising Producer | |
| 2003 | Gadget & the Gadgetinis | Writer | 1 episode |
| 2007–09 | WordWorld | Writer | 6 episodes |
| 2007–08 | Mama Mirabelle's Home Movies | Writer Lyricist | wrote 6 episodes wrote lyrics for 3 episodes |
| 2008–10 | Arthur | Writer | 3 episodes |
| 2009–11 | Speed Racer: The Next Generation | Writer Story Writer | Wrote 3 episodes Story wrote 1 episode Other: 8 episodes |
| 2009–11 | Jungle Junction | Writer | 4 episodes |
| 2010–11 | Between the Lions | Writer | 2 episodes |
| 2010 | Cyberchase | Writer | 1 episode |
| 2010 | Martha Speaks | Writer | 1 episode |
| 2010–11 | The Octonauts | Writer Story Editor Lyricist | wrote 14 episodes story edited 25 episodes |
| 2011 | Jingle All the Way | Screenplay | |
| 2011 | Jelly Jamm | Writer | 5 episodes |
| 2012 | Jingle & Bell's Christmas Star | Screenplay | |
| 2014 | Polariffic | Screenwriter | |
| 2014 | Astroblast! | Writer | 1 episode |
| 2014–18 | Space Racers | Developer Head Writer Writer Producer/Co-Producer Various Voices Theme Music Lyricist | 90 episodes |
| 2015 | Tickety Toc | Writer | 1 episode |
| 2015–16 | Tumble Leaf | Writer | 3 episodes |
| 2019–20 | Bug Diaries | Executive Producer Developer Story Editor | developed 12 episodes story edited 3 episodes executive produced 12 episodes |
| 2020 | Chico Bon Bon: Monkey with a Tool Belt | Writer | 3 episodes |
| 2021–22 | Bubble Guppies | Headwriter | 26 episodes |
| 2021–22 | Rugrats | Writer | 5 episodes |
| 2021–22 | Donkey Hodie | Writer | 2 episodes |
| 2025–26 | Weather Hunters | Writer | 2 episodes |
