= Joey D'Auria =

American actor (born 1953 or 1954)

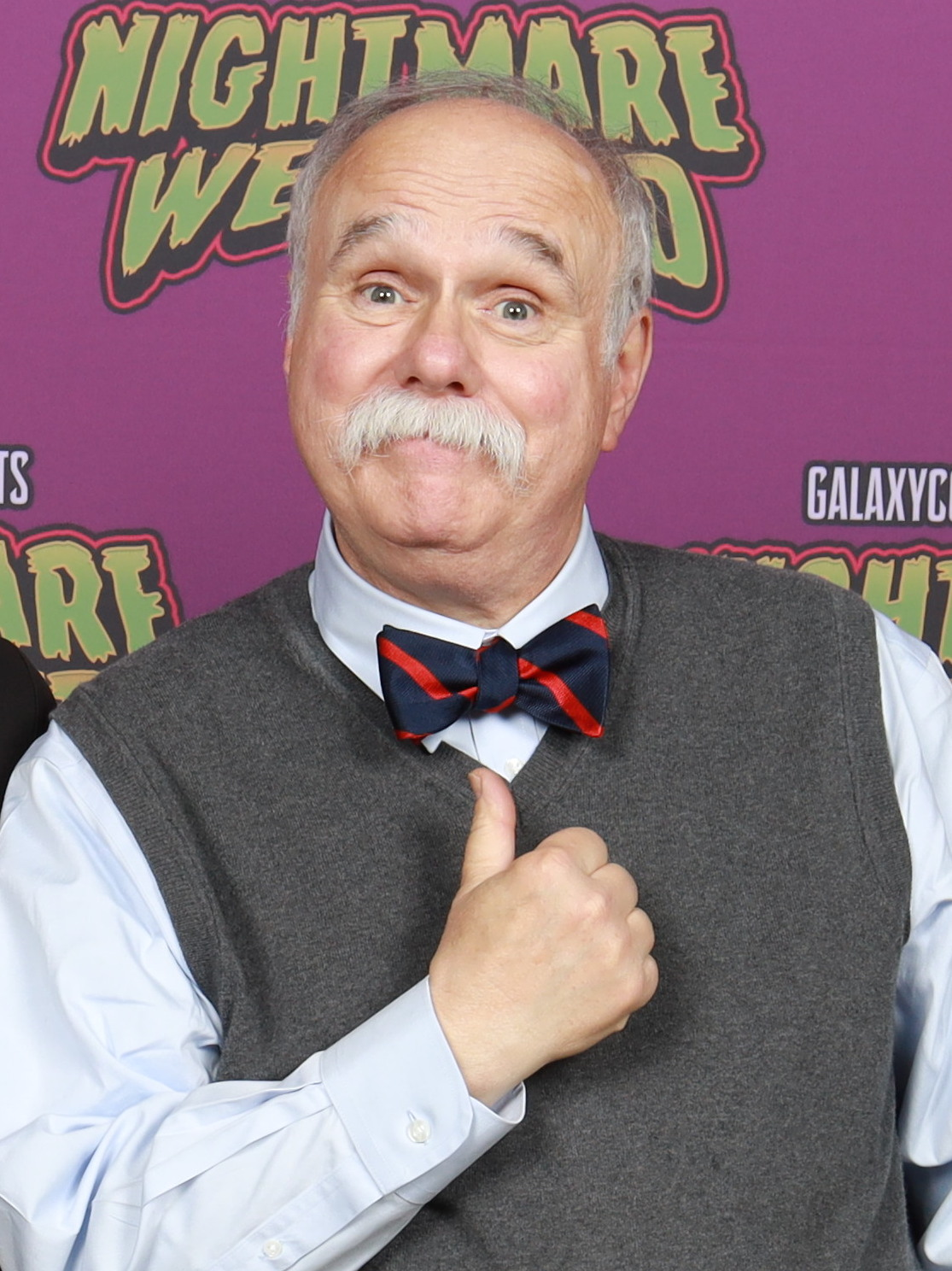
- D'Auria in 2025
- Born: 1953 or 1954 (age 72–73)
- Other names: J.W. Terry; Joseph J. Terry; Joseph W. Terry
- Occupation: Actor · writer

Joey D'Auria (born 1953 or 1954) is an American actor, and writer best known for his role as Bozo the Clown in The Bozo Show, succeeding original actor Bob Bell. He is also known as J.W. Terry, Joseph J. Terry, and Joseph W. Terry.

== Career ==
D'Auria is best known for his role in WGN-TV Chicago's The Bozo Show from 1984 to 2001. D'Auria was hired after a long search for the next Bozo in part because his improvisational skills were very good. D'Auria also blended well with Roy Brown, who said he knew right away that D'Auria would be a hit after telling him he had broken his arm in three places and getting a response of, "Then don't go in those three places!" D'Auria played Bozo until the show's cancellation in 2001.

== Filmography ==
=== Film ===
Year	Title	Role	Notes
1978	The Mystery of Mamo	Stuckey	Voice
2004	Ghost in the Shell 2: Innocence	Kim	Voice
2005	The Toy Warrior	Gramps	Voice
2006	Curious George	Additional voices	Voice
2008	Light of Olympia	Witch Doctor	
2010	Camp Hell	Talk Radio Host	
2011	Wrinkles	Martin	Voice
2011	Puss in Boots: A Furry Tail	Puss / Joe the Mouse	Voice
2012	War of the Worlds: Goliath	Nikola Tesla	Voice
2012	A Turtle's Tale 2: Sammy's Escape from Paradise	Moray Eel Philippe	Voice
2013	The Jungle Book: Return 2 the Jungle	Akela / Kaa	Voice
2013	The House of Magic	Reggie Willis	Voice
2014	Jungle Shuffle	Reiser	Voice
2014	Yo-kai Watch: The Movie	Various voices	Voice
2015	Top Cat Begins	Rat	Voice
2022	Marmaduke	Shar Pei	Voice
2022	Tom and Jerry: Snowman's Land	Butch	Voice

=== Television ===
Year	Title	Role	Notes
1983	American Playhouse	Club El Gaucho Patron	Episode: "Miss Lonelyhearts"
1984	Alice	Deliveryman	Episode: "Lies My Mother Told Me"
1984–1994	The Bozo Show	Bozo	also writer
1989	Late Night with David Letterman	Bozo	Episode dated 5 May 1989
1994–2001	The Bozo Super Sunday Show	Bozo	also writer
1996	The Tonight Show with Jay Leno	Bozo	Episode #4.152
2001	Bozo: 40 Years of Fun!	Bozo	Television film; also head writer
2002	Digimon: Digital Monsters	Burgermon / Chuchidarumon	2 episodes
2004–09	God, Save Our King!	Additional voices	117 episodes
2006	Talkshow with Spike Feresten	Stimurol	Episode: "Tom Green"
2008–09	The Mr. Men Show	Various voices	31 episodes
2009–10	Olivia	Additional voices	26 episodes
2009–10	Funny Face	Various voices	16 episodes
2010–14	The Jungle Book	Masha / Akela / Kaa	85 episodes
2012	How I Met Your Mother	Fred	Episode: "The Stamp Tramp"
2014	The Thundermans	Science Fair Judge #1	Episode: "Weird Science Fair"
2014–18	Space Racers	Various voices	63 episodes
2014–21	The Tom and Jerry Show	Butch / TV Narrator / Droopy Dog	72 episodes
2015–17	Yo-kai Watch	Whisper / Robonyan	62 episodes
2021	Tom and Jerry in New York	Butch / Bocce Player / Piano Player	6 episodes
2022	The Loud House	Buzz / Male Employee	2 episodes
TBA	Fairy Tale Forest	Papa / Coachman	Television film

=== Video games ===
Year	Title	Role	Source
2006	Blue Dragon	Hineto, chiefs of Lago and Talta Villages	
2007	The Amazing Spider-Man Interactive Adventures	Narrator	
2007	Dead Head Fred	Various voices	
2008	Command & Conquer: Red Alert 3	Voice	
2009	Ratchet & Clank Future: A Crack in Time	Azimuth / Mac Mackeroy	
2013	BioShock Infinite	Additional voices	
2013	Lightning Returns: Final Fantasy XIII	Additional voices	
2013	Yo-kai Watch	Whisper	
2014	Yo-kai Watch 2	Whisper	
2015	Mobius Final Fantasy	Additional voices	
2016	Batman: Arkham	Voice	
2018	Yo-kai Watch 3	Whisper, narrator, Indexter, Nervous Rex	
