= Kids' WB =

American children's programming block

- Final logo used from 1997 to 2008 (Note: This logo was also used as an online logo from 2008 to 2009.)
- Network: The WB (Note: 1995–2006); The CW (Note: 2006–2008)
- Launched: September 9, 1995; 31 years ago
- Closed: May 17, 2008; 18 years ago (block); May 17, 2015; 11 years ago (website)
- Country of origin: United States
- Owner: Warner Bros. Television Studios (Skydance Corporation)
- Headquarters: Burbank, California, U.S.
- Original language: English
- Voices of: Jeff Bennett (1995–1997); Jim Cummings (1997–2008)
- Official website: (2008 archive)

Kids' WB (stylized as Kids' WB!) was an American children's programming block that originally aired on The WB from September 9, 1995, to September 16, 2006, and later on The CW from September 23, 2006, to May 17, 2008. Initially launched as a competitor to Fox Kids, Kids' WB aired primarily during the Saturday morning and weekday after-school time slots, although airtimes for the block's programming varied at the local affiliate's discretion.

In 1999, the block gained a major foothold in the children's television market when it acquired the rights to 4Kids Entertainment's English-dub of the Pokémon anime (which had previously been syndicated on Fox-affiliated stations the previous year), helping cement the anime as a pop culture phenomenon among American audiences. Other notable series during the block's WB run included Animaniacs (a Fox Kids carryover) and its spinoff Pinky and the Brain (which began as a WB prime time series), Freakazoid!, The New Batman/Superman Adventures, Histeria!, Cardcaptors, Yu-Gi-Oh!, Jackie Chan Adventures, Static Shock, and Johnny Test.

The block moved to The CW (a result of the merger of Time Warner-owned The WB and CBS Corporation-owned UPN) upon its launch in September 2006. Following a nearly 13-year run on broadcast television, on May 24, 2008, Kids' WB was replaced by successor block The CW4Kids (later renamed Toonzai in 2010) under a time-lease agreement reached between The CW and 4Kids Entertainment to take over programming the network's Saturday morning timeslot. An online version of Kids' WB featuring episodes of popular series from the block operated from April 29, 2008, to May 17, 2015.

== History ==
=== 1994–95: Planning stages ===
In July 1994, ahead of the launch of The WB, plans for Kids' WB were already being made, with a September 1995 launch. The network planned new episodes of Animaniacs, as well as reruns for the weekday blocks, and two all-new series: The Sylvester & Tweety Mysteries and Freakazoid!. Animaniacs would continue on Fox for the entirety of the 1994–95 season. Long-term plans included the expansion of the Saturday block to four hours in 1996, while the weekday block would expand to two hours by 1996 or 1997. In February 1995, a further title from Warner Bros. Animation, the Animaniacs spin-off Pinky and the Brain, was announced for the block. The block had plans to surpass Fox Kids within a ten-year window.

The first announced series coming from a studio other than Warner Bros. Animation was Universal Cartoon Studios' Earthworm Jim, based on the video game series of the same name. During August 1995, it struck a deal with Kraft Foods for "watch-and-win" sweepstakes. On August 18, 1995, 30-second previews of The Sylvester & Tweety Mysteries were released for AOL subscribers as a test run. A full website was expected for September.

=== 1995–99: Early years ===
First Kids' WB logo, used from 1995 to 1997.

Kids' WB premiered on September 9, 1995, airing Saturday mornings from 8:00 to 11:00 a.m. and weekdays from 4:00 p.m. to 5:00 p.m. The block was structured to air in all time zones, airing on a tape delay outside of the Eastern Time Zone to adjust the recommended airtime of the block to each zone. However, during its first five years, an exact timeslot was not announced on-air, leaving viewers to check their local WB station listings; since the programs had different airtimes depending on the local WB affiliate schedule in the market. On September 7, 1996, the Saturday block was extended by one hour, airing from 8:00 a.m. to 12:00 p.m. Eastern Time.

Simultaneously with the launch of the block, it also launched an online service which was initially available exclusively for AOL subscribers. Ratings for its first Saturday (its first day on air) had a share of 1.5%, ending in fourth place among the Saturday morning blocks, but the final figures were delayed due to some stations clearing Fox Kids on Saturdays, moving the Kids' WB block to Sundays.

Although Kids' WB aired on almost all of The WB's affiliated stations (including those later affiliated with The WB 100+ Station Group), the network's Chicago affiliate WGN-TV – owned by The WB's co-parent, the Tribune Company – declined to carry the weekday and Saturday blocks. Instead, it opted to air its weekday and Saturday morning newscasts (the first incarnation of the latter was canceled in 1998), and other locally-produced programming (such as The Bozo Super Sunday Show) in the morning hours, and syndicated programming in the afternoons. Kids' WB programming instead aired on Weigel Broadcasting-owned WCIU-TV. However, WGN's superstation feed carried the block from 1995 to 1999, making the network available to markets without a local affiliate. WGN-TV began clearing Kids' WB on its Chicago broadcast signal in 2004, taking over the local rights from WCIU-TV.

At launch, 30% of the network's 78 affiliates cleared the block for Sundays. The total sum of the stations carrying the block, as affiliates of the network, accounted for 83% of the population. Plans for a weekday morning block started in early 1996, mirroring a similar move from UPN Kids; the block was set to start in 1997.

For its second season in 1996, the first batch of new shows joined: two series from Warner Bros., Superman: The Animated Series and Road Rovers, as well as WB-Nelvana copro Waynehead created by Damon Wayans. Road Rovers was produced without the help of Steven Spielberg. During the summer months of 1996, a promotional campaign with Best Western was held to promote the upcoming Superman series, which included a limited promotional poster of the character in the months of August and September, when television promotion for the series was set to begin.

On September 1, 1997, a weekday morning block was added from 7:00 a.m. to 8:00 a.m. and the weekday afternoon block was extended by one hour, running from 3:00 p.m. to 5:00 p.m. However, selected WB affiliates and WGN's superstation feed would not begin airing the morning block until the following day, due to local preemptions caused by preexisting commitments to air The Jerry Lewis MDA Labor Day Telethon. Some areas (such as KTLA in Los Angeles) aired the weekday morning and afternoon lineups together as an expanded three-hour block, running from 2:00 to 5:00 p.m. On the same date, the block received an on-air rebranding – which included a revised logo and graphics package centered upon the Warner Bros. Studios lot theme that was also used in promotions for The WB's primetime programming during the network's first eight years on the air – which was developed by Riverstreet Productions, and lasted until 2005.

=== 1999–2006: Introduction of anime ===
On February 13, 1999, Kids' WB made a breakthrough when the English dub of the anime series Pokémon by 4Kids Entertainment moved to the network from broadcast syndication. It became a major hit for the programming block, helping it beat Fox Kids with its animated lineup backed by Warner Bros. Entertainment. Other anime shows aired on Kids' WB in later years, such as Cardcaptors, Yu-Gi-Oh!, Astro Boy, MegaMan NT Warrior, and Viewtiful Joe.

In July 2001, Kids' WB's weekday afternoon lineup was rebranded as Toonami on Kids' WB, extending Cartoon Network's action-oriented Toonami block to broadcast television, and bringing shows such as Sailor Moon, Dragon Ball Z, and The Powerpuff Girls to broadcast network television. However, the sub-block was critically panned by industry observers, who noticed that the action branding of the block—which had added shows such as Generation O!, Scooby-Doo, and The Nightmare Room, a live-action series created by Goosebumps author R. L. Stine—did not translate content-wise. And while the cross promotion between Cartoon Network and Kids' WB did allow for series to be shared between the networks, most of these only lasted a short period of time. This included Dragon Ball Z and Sailor Moon appearing on Toonami on Kids' WB for only two weeks, and Cardcaptors appearing on the main Toonami block on Cartoon Network for only two weeks. In spring 2002, Kids' WB announced that they would drop the Toonami name from their weekday lineup, once again making the Toonami brand exclusive to Cartoon Network.

On September 3, 2001, the Kids' WB weekday morning block was retired, with The WB giving that slot back to its local affiliates to carry locally-produced shows, syndicated programming and/or infomercials.

On May 31, 2005, The WB announced that the weekday afternoon Kids' WB block would be retired "at the request of the local affiliates," as it became financially unattractive due to the fact broadcast stations perceived that children's programming viewership on afternoon timeslots had gravitated more towards cable networks – these stations began to target more adult audiences with talk shows and sitcom reruns in the daytime. Kids' WB's weekday programming continued, but with redundant programming and theme weeks until December 30, 2005 (the block began to increasingly promote Cartoon Network, their afternoon Miguzi block, Hi Hi Puffy AmiYumi, and the Kids' WB Saturday morning lineup during the transition). The weekday afternoon Kids' WB block aired for the last time on December 30, 2005, and was replaced on January 2, 2006, by "Daytime WB", a more adult-targeted general entertainment block featuring repeats of sitcoms and drama series formerly seen on the major networks. As a result, the Saturday morning Kids' WB lineup that remained was extended by one hour on January 7, 2006, running from 7:00 a.m. to noon, no longer affected by time zone variances."Kids WB!".

=== 2006–08: Move to The CW and closure ===
On January 24, 2006, Warner Bros. Television (producer of Kids' WB and owner of the block's original broadcaster from 1995 to 2006, The WB) and CBS Corporation (owner of UPN and subsidiary of National Amusements, who also owns film studio Paramount Pictures' parent company Viacom) announced that they would merge both The WB and UPN into The CW, which would primarily air programs aired by its two soon-to-be predecessor networks as part of its initial lineup. The combined network utilized The WB's scheduling practices (inheriting the 30-hour weekly programming schedule that the network utilized at the time of the announcement) and brought the Kids' WB block, still run by Warner Bros. Television and maintaining the same name, to the new lineup (The CW's decision to use The WB's scheduling model was mainly due to the fact that it included children's and daytime programming blocks that were not offered by UPN, which had not aired any children's programming since the Disney's One Too block was cancelled in August 2003). Notably, during this time AOL—then a sister company to Warner Bros.—was the main sponsor of CBS' own Saturday morning block KOL Secret Slumber Party, but at no point did neither Kids' WB nor SSP advertise each other's programs—most likely because SSP was produced and operated by DIC Entertainment and was aimed at girls, as opposed to the boy-centric Kids' WB.

With Kids' WB being moved to The CW, it was announced that The WB would drop all anime programming from the schedule ahead of the merger. Coinciding with the English dubbing rights being passed from 4Kids Entertainment to Pokémon USA, the Pokémon anime was moved exclusively to Cartoon Network (which had been airing reruns of the earlier seasons since 2002) for first-run episode broadcasts on September 8, 2006 beginning with its ninth season, Pokémon: Battle Frontier, with the earlier seasons being moved to sister channel Boomerang over a month earlier on July 31, 2006. Cartoon Network continued to premiere new episodes of the anime until the end of the nineteenth season, Pokémon the Series: XYZ, on January 28, 2017 (after which the series was moved Disney XD), while Boomerang continued to rerun the older seasons until over a week later on February 5, 2017.

Final Kids' WB logo, used from 2009 to 2015.

On October 2, 2007, The CW announced that it would cancel the Kids' WB programming block through a joint decision between corporate parents Time Warner and CBS Corporation, due to the effects of children's advertising limits and cable competition; the network also announced that it would sell the five-hour Saturday programming slot to 4Kids Entertainment. The Kids' WB block aired for the final time on May 17, 2008 (for some stations that aired the block on a day-behind basis, the block's last airdate was on May 18, 2008).

On May 24, 2008, 4Kids launched The CW4Kids in place of Kids' WB. The lineup for the block consisted of 4Kids-produced shows, such as Chaotic, as well as new seasons of Yu-Gi-Oh! and Teenage Mutant Ninja Turtles. The official site, TheCW4Kids.com, officially launched on April 20, 2008. The block was renamed Toonzai on August 14, 2010, it was replaced by Vortexx (programmed by Saban Brands) on August 25, 2012, and it continued to air until it ended on September 27, 2014; the block that currently airs on The CW is One Magnificent Morning, which debuted on October 4, 2014.

=== 2008–present: Online networks ===
WB Kids
- Website type: Children's
- Available in: English
- Headquarters: Burbank, California, U.S.
- Parent: Warner Bros. Entertainment
- Website: www.wbkidsgo.com
- Commercial: Yes
- Registration: Closed
- Launched: 1996; 30 years ago
- Current status: Closed

DC Kids
- Website type: Children's
- Available in: English
- Headquarters: Burbank, California, U.S.
- Parent: DC Entertainment
- Website: www.dckids.com
- Commercial: Yes
- Registration: Closed
- Launched: April 28, 2008; 18 years ago
- Current status: Closed

On April 28, 2008, Warner Bros. Entertainment announced that The WB and Kids' WB would be relaunched as online networks, with the Kids' WB network consisting of five subchannels: Kids' WB! (for WB shows for kids and families), Kids' WB! Jr. (for shows for younger children), Scooby-Doo, Looney Tunes, and two different websites of DC Kids: DC HeroZone.com and DC Beyond.com (for action-oriented animated shows for DC fans). After the dissolution of In2TV, the Kids' WB online portal absorbed most of that service's children's programming. The service was significantly scaled back in 2013, with most of the archival content being removed. The archival content can be easily accessed through the Internet Archive's Wayback Machine.

The site was split into 3 websites on May 17, 2015: DCKids.com, LooneyTunes.com, and ScoobyDoo.com. All three are grouped into WB Kids Sites. The decision to split the site into three ended, after almost twenty years, the use of the "Kids' WB!" brand name. Also, the WB Kids Sites got new YouTube channels: WB Kids for main Warner Bros. properties, and DC Kids for DC Comics properties. In July 2016, 2 of the 3 websites re-merged into "WBKids GO!". DCKids.com remained active until 2023. On December 14, 2023, the WBKids GO! and DC Kids websites appear to have been shut down; the links to their websites now redirect to the respective YouTube channels.
