= Super Sunday Show =

The Super Sunday Show may refer to:

- The Bozo Super Sunday Show, a television show from the United States
- The Super Sunday Show, a television show from Australia hosted by the puppet Agro
