= Jungle Shuffle =

- Film poster
- Directed by: Taedong Park; Mauricio De la Orta
- Screenplay by: Mauricio De la Orta; Johnny Hartmann; Brad Schreiber
- Story by: Mauricio De la Orta; Jean Dubois Renaud; Duane Orville Trejo
- Produced by: Yongjin Kwon
- Starring: Drake Bell; Rob Schneider; Alicia Silverstone
- Edited by: Alex Agoston; Youngwan Ko
- Music by: Mario Santos
- Production companies: Animation Picture Company; Avikoo Studios; Emotion Collective Design; Westbridge University - WEFIS; WonderWorld Studios; CG Makers; Woori Investment Co.
- Distributed by: CJ Entertainment
- Release date: 2 October 2014 (South Korea)
- Running time: 82 minutes
- Countries: South Korea; Mexico; Colombia; United States
- Language: English
- Budget: $10 million

Jungle Shuffle is a 2014 animated adventure film directed by Taedong Park and Mauricio De la Orta. It stars the voices of Drake Bell, Rob Schneider, Alicia Silverstone, and Tom Arnold.

== Plot ==
The film is the story of a group of coatis (aka coatimundis) living in the Mexican rainforest. A young coati named Manu (Brianne Brozey) is the best friend of Sacha (Jessica DiCicco) and he is deeply in love with her. However, Manu has a reputation of being a troublemaker and Sacha is the daughter of the Coati Tribe's King (Tom Arnold) who dislikes Manu. Following an incident where a statue being made for the Coati King ends up accidentally destroyed, the Coati King exiles Manu from his kingdom never to return much to the objection of Sacha.

One year later, Manu (Drake Bell) has changed his ways and is still in love with Sacha (Alicia Silverstone). One day, Sacha is abducted by a group of poachers named Helms (voiced by Michael McConnohie) and Reiser (voiced by Joey D'Auria working for the mysterious Dr. Loco (Rob Schneider) who has been experimenting on animals using a Gene Booster device. Sacha's abduction causes Manu to team up with a spider monkey named Chuy (Rob Schneider) to rescue her so that he can redeem himself to the Coati King.

== Voice cast ==
- Drake Bell as Manu
  - Brianne Brozey as young Manu
- Rob Schneider as:
  - Chuy
  - Great Monkey
  - Dr. Loco
  - Tuana
- Alicia Silverstone as Sacha
  - Jessica DiCicco as young Sacha
- Tom Arnold as Coati King
- Joey D'Auria as Reiser
- Chris Gardner as Balaam
- Eric Lopez as Artex
- Michael McConnohie as Helms
- Steve Prince as Louca
- Eddie Santiago as Pacal
- Fred Tatasciore as:
  - Cusumba
  - Chimera
- Amanda Troop as Cecilia
- Debra Wilson as Kam

== Crew ==
- Mark A.Z. Dippé - Voice Director
- Richard Epcar - Voice Director

== Release ==
Jungle Shuffle was released in South Korea on 2 October 2014 and in the United States, via direct-to-DVD, on 10 March 2015.
