= The Vacant Lot =

Canadian television series

- Genre: Comedy
- Country of origin: Canada
- Original language: English
- No. of episodes: 6

Production
- Running time: 30 minutes

Original release
- Release: 1993 – 1994

The Vacant Lot is a short-lived sketch comedy show starring the comedy group of the same name, which CBC Television ran for only six episodes starting in December 1993. The Vacant Lot was originally extended for another 13 episodes, which were scripted but never filmed when new president of the CBC Perrin Beatty wanted to phase out of edgy comedy programs in favor of lighter fare such as This Hour Has 22 Minutes. The show was produced by Cynthia Grech, primarily directed by Rob Quartly and executive producers were Lorne Michaels, Pam Thomas and Jim Biederman, all of whom were producers of CBC's The Kids in the Hall (in which the members appeared as extras from time to time).

Unlike The Kids in the Hall, The Vacant Lot consists of filmed sketches that were screened to a studio audience. The show would also have a musical piece each episode and did not have recurring characters.

Broadway Video and the troupe's manager Karen Evans sold the show to the CBC, MTV (which did not end up airing the episodes in lieu of The State) and Comedy Central, which did not air the episodes until July 1994. The Vacant Lot was shown as a Fourth of July marathon on that network.

Nick McKinney, a member of The Vacant Lot, is the brother of The Kids in the Hall member and Saturday Night Live veteran Mark McKinney. The show's other cast members Rob Gfroerer, Vito Viscomi, and Paul Greenberg, regularly performed at The Rivoli and then Mark introduced them at a party.

The Vacant Lot's opening theme music was "Pretty Vacant" by The Sex Pistols.

== Episode list ==
Episode 1	Blinded By The Light	Boxing 1	You May Go...Now	Chamber of Horrors	Shiatzu	Boxing 2	Customs	Slept on His Arms	Boxing 3
Episode 2	The Time Helmet	Five Bucks! 1	Mr. Wiggle's Clubhouse	Five Bucks! 2	The Head	Five Bucks 3	Pamper Me	Mr. Wiggle's Clubhouse 2	
Episode 3	Laundry Day Fashions	Steamies	Burglar and Dog 1	Bonnet	Of Mice and Snoopy	Burglar and Dog 2	Burglar and Dog 3	The Silent Ventriloquist	"We're Gonna Get Lucky Tonight" Song
Episode 4	Chocolate Mousse	Nose Clippers	Pants! The Musical	Bus Stop	I'm Bored	Trash Can Fight 1	Pizza Delivery	Trash Can Fight 2	
Episode 5	Police Line-Up	Emergency Rescue	Jesus in the Classroom 1	Pygmalion	Jesus in the Classroom 2	The Thread	Jesus in the Classroom 3	Knee Slap	
Episode 6	Party Music	Killing Your Dad	Dance Avant de Tomber	Was the Party Too Loud, Mr. Smithers?	Eggtown Boy 1	My Music Will Live On	(This Song's Gonna Make A) Great Video	Eggtown Boy	
