= The Jungle Book (2010 TV series) =

3D animated television series

- All major characters from The Jungle Book. From clockwise: Baloo, Mowgli, Shere Khan, Kaa, and Bagheera.
- Genre: Animation
- Created by: Christian Croquet
- Based on: Rudyard Kipling's The Jungle Book
- Developed by: DQ Entertainment
- Directed by: Tapaas Chakravarti
- Voices of: Emma Tate; Sam Gold; Jimmy Hibbert; David Holt; Nigel Pilkington; Joseph J. Terry; Aaron Albertus; Teresa Gallagher; Sarah Natochenny; Abe Goldfarb; David Wills; Marc Thompson; Billy Bob Thompson
- Theme music composer: Richard Kipling (episodes 40–52)
- Opening theme: "It's in the Jungle Book"
- Ending theme: "It's in the Jungle Book"
- Composer: Guy Michelmore
- Countries of origin: India; Germany; France
- Original languages: English; German; French; Hindi; Telugu; Tamil
- No. of seasons: 3
- No. of episodes: 156

Production
- Executive producers: Tapaas Chakravati (seasons 1–2); Vishal Dudeja; Rouhini Jaswal; Shona Nivedita Chakravati (season 3); Christophe di Sabatino (seasons 1–2); Nicolas Atlan (season 1); Benoît Di Sabatino (season 2); Maïa Tubiana (seasons 1–2); Caroline Duvochel (season 3); Nicole Keeb; Arne Lohmann; Dominique Poussier (season 1); Yann Labasque (season 2)
- Producers: Tapaas Chakravati; Maïa Tubiana (season 3)
- Editors: Steven Banks; Mark Zaslove
- Running time: 11 minutes
- Production companies: DQ Entertainment International; ZDF Enterprises; MoonScoop (seasons 1–2); Ellipsanime Productions (season 3); Les Cartooneurs Associés (season 3)

Original release
- Network: Nickelodeon (India); TF1 (France, seasons 1–2); Piwi+ (France, season 3); ZDF (Germany)
- Release: 12 August 2010 – 10 October 2020

The Jungle Book is a 3D animated television series produced by Indian animation studio DQ Entertainment, French animation companies MoonScoop (Season 1–2), Ellipsanime Productions (Season 3), Les Cartooneurs Associés (Season 3), German broadcasting network ZDF and its production & distribution arm ZDF Enterprises. TF1 handled the participation for seasons 1 and 2. (Note: Seasons 1–2 were produced with the participation of ABC, Universal Pictures, Buena Vista International, JCCTV, TVO and the BBC, with the addition of Sofica Cofanim and Backup Films for the second season. Season 3 was solely produced with the participation of Piwi+.) It is based on the Rudyard Kipling book of the same name.

== Plot ==
The Jungle Book is about the adventures of Mowgli, a human foundling raised by Akela's wolf pack, and his best friends, fatherly bear Baloo and playful panther Bagheera. They live in the Indian jungle where many dangers lurk, such as the mighty Bengal tiger, Shere Khan. The inquisitive Mowgli often gets himself into trouble and can't resist helping animals in danger or solving other problems.

== Characters ==
=== Main ===
- Mowgli (voiced by Emma Tate in seasons 1–2 and Sarah Natochenny in season 3) is a human boy raised by wolves in the jungle, as the adoptive son of Daruka and Raksha, and the adoptive brother of Lali and Bala. He keeps a tiger claw as a pendant which he took in a battle from Shere Khan. His first Hindi voice was Vaibhav Thakkar who was replaced by Pooja Punjabi.
- Bagheera (voiced by Sam Gold in seasons 1–2 and Abe Goldfarb in season 3) is a black panther. He is Mowgli's best friend. Unlike most other adaptations (like Disney's 1967 film), Bagheera is not as wise or strict as in the book. Most animals in the jungle never dare to step in the way of the panther. He often fights Shere Khan to save Mowgli. His first Hindi voice was Rajesh Kava.
- Baloo (voiced by Jimmy Hibbert in seasons 1–2 and David Wills in season 3) is a Himalayan brown bear. In the series, like his Disney counterpart, Baloo can be lazy at times, loves to eat honey and enjoys singing. He is also bipedal, wears glasses (like his GoodTimes Entertainment counterpart) and he is Mowgli's strict but wise mentor like in the original book. Baloo likes to tell stories of the jungle. His first Hindi voice was Mayur Vyas.
- Kaa (voiced by Joseph J. Terry in seasons 1–2, Billy Bob Thompson in season 3) is an Indian python who is sort of friends with Mowgli, Bagheera, and Baloo, yet moody and feared.

=== Seeonee Wolf Pack ===
- Akela (voiced by Joseph J. Terry in seasons 1–2) is an elderly Indian wolf who is the most trusted leader of the Seeonee Wolf Pack. He is the father of Daruka, the father-in-law of Raksha, and the grandfather of Lali, Bala and Phaona. His first Hindi voice was Manish Bhawan.
- Daruka (voiced by Aaron Albertus in seasons 1–2) is the mate of Raksha, the father of Lali and Bala, and the adoptive father of Mowgli. Although Mowgli usually lives with Baloo and Bagheera, he visits Daruka's family sometimes.
- Raksha is the mate of Daruka, the mother of Lali and Bala, and the adoptive mother of Mowgli. She is patient and motherly, but can be stern when necessary.
- Lali (voiced by Emma Tate in seasons 1–2) is the daughter of Daruka and Raksha, the older sister of Bala, and the adoptive sister of Mowgli. She is sweet, and caring, like her mother, but can be extremely protective and rebellious. Her grandfather is Akela.
- Bala (voiced by Teresa Gallagher in seasons 1–2) is the son of Daruka and Raksha, the younger brother of Lali, and adoptive brother of Mowgli. He is a brave and loyal, but competitive wolf, who often gets in trouble. His grandfather is Akela. His Hindi voice is Swapnil Kumari.

=== Villains ===
- Shere Khan (voiced by David Holt in seasons 1–2 and Marc Thompson in season 3) is a Bengal tiger who is the main antagonist of the series. He plans to kill and eat Mowgli, but often fails in his attempts. He has a scar on his left eye. Shere Khan lost one of his claws in an earlier fight with Mowgli who keeps the claw as a pendant.
- Tabaqui (voiced by Nigel Pilkington in seasons 1–2) is an Indian jackal. He is Shere Khan's sycophantic, greedy, devious sidekick who lacks the courage to disagree with his tiger master. He is usually the one to set up traps for Mowgli so Shere Khan can eat him.
- Bandar-log are a group of langurs who like to cause trouble for Mowgli and his friends. They live in the Cold Lair temple ruins.
  - Masha (voiced by Teresa Gallagher in seasons 1–2) is a langur who is the queen of the Bandar-logs.
- Jacala (voiced by David Holt in seasons 1–2) is a mugger crocodile who would eat anyone that trespasses into his territory. He also has five sons. Despite his grumpy personality, he is a caring and loving father to his sons.
- Kala (voiced by David Holt in seasons 1–2) is a black panther who looks like Bagheera. He is highly territorial and hostile towards Bagheera and Mowgli. He has a scar on his right eye.
- Phaona (voiced by Aaron Albertus in seasons 1–2) is an Indian wolf who is the grandson of Akela and another one of Mowgli's adoptive Brothers. Despite being one of Mowgli's adoptive brothers, he dislikes Mowgli being in the wolf pack, tries every attempt to expel the adopted human from the pack, and will stop at nothing to attempt becoming the next pack leader. Phaona's plots tend to backfire and he tends to get punished by his grandfather.
- Harjeet/Harjit (voiced by David Holt in seasons 1–2) is a bad-tempered honey badger.
- Kaloo is a crow who works for Shere Khan, and has a rivalry with Tabaqui.

=== Other animals ===
- Darzi (voiced by Peter Michail/Teresa Gallagher in seasons 1–2) is a tiny red sunbird without a mate or nest. Brave for her size and friendly, but poor as a messenger (as in the book), causing bird-brain and terrible memory.
- Hathi (voiced by Phil Lollar in seasons 1–2) is a wise Indian elephant who is the leader of the jungle's elephants.
  - Gajjini is a light violet elephant who is married to Hathi.
  - Appu and Hita are Hathi and Gajjini's two calves who are Mowgli's friends.
- Rangoo is a colourful fruit-eating bird.
- Cheel is a kite.
- Ikki is an Indian crested porcupine.
- Rikki-Tikki-Tavi (voiced by Nigel Pilkington in seasons 1–2) is an Indian gray mongoose. Here he lives in the jungle with the other animals. He is very cute-faced, ferret-sized and fearless (once even fought with Shere Khan in order to defend Mowgli).
- Thuu is an Indian cobra, occasionally the leader of a cobra's nest.
- Manny is a young langur who is friends with Mowgli.
- Oo and Boo are a couple of old turtles.
- Pavo is a leucistic peacock who has poor eyesight (a common trait for albino animals in real life).
- Alonna is a demoiselle crane.
- Hoola/Phoola is a peacock who is Pavo's rival.
- Rana is a wild pig who has a short temper.
- Langur is a Himalayan langur is a friend of Mowgli.
- Ravi and Vira are a bluebird couple.
- Chota is a Bengal tiger cub who is friends with Mowgli.
- Ponya is a red panda.
- ChuChip/ChooChip is a young sambar deer whom Mowgli befriends.
- Bella is a female bear that Baloo falls for, but she's actually trying to get rid of Baloo, but she later reformed after she and Baloo reconcile.
- Bara is a barasingha deer who dreams of becoming one of Santa's flying reindeer.
- Lori is a loris who is always worried about Bara.
- Ackney is an Indian giant squirrel.
- Chappal is an adult sambar deer and the father of Chuchip.
- Chanda is an adult Bengal tiger and the mother of Chota.
- Anupam is a blind monkey and mentor who teaches Mowgli how to get around without the use of his eyes.

== Production ==
DQ Entertainment announced the series on 30 March 2009, which would comprise fifty-two 11-minute episodes and a 60-minute feature-length film. French network TF1, German network ZDF, and its production arm ZDF Enterprises were announced as co-production partners, the latter holding distribution rights to the series in most countries except for French- and English-speaking territories, Ireland, the Middle East and Latin America, while Universal Pictures International Entertainment secured home video rights in the UK, France, Australia, New Zealand and Japan and select other countries. MoonScoop joined as the series' co-producer in May. In November, DQ secured a broadcast partner deal with Buena Vista International to exclusively air the series on Disney Channel networks in twenty-nine Asian territories, including India and Japan. Additional broadcast partner deals included ABC (Australia) in December 2009, CBBC and BBC Two (United Kingdom) and TVO (Canada) in April 2010, JCCTV (Qatar) in April 2011

In February 2011, the series was renewed for a second season; this time produced as a co-production between DQ and ZDF Enterprises with the same broadcast partners from Season 1 1 returning. Tapaas Chakravarti, Chairman and CEO of DQ Entertainment, said that they decided to make the second season of Jungle Book after the tremendous success of the first season in India and globally. The animated series had a fan following and, in his view, created the need to see more stories about Mowgli and his jungle friends. Tapas said that the second season will be followed by a TV special, a Christmas special, a Halloween special and many other spin-offs. The partnership between DQ Entertainment and ZDF was described as symbiotic as they were producing several other projects for them.

An animated feature film based on the series was released in 2013. The film was produced by Tapaas Chakravarti, and directed by Jun Falkenstein and Kevin Johnson.

In October 2015, DQ renewed the series for a third season. ZDF and ZDF Enterprises remained as co-producers, while MoonScoop's co-producer role was replaced with Paris-based French animation studio Ellipsanime Productions which had purchased their assets in January 2014. Piwi+ replaced TF1 as the French broadcast partner.

== Episodes ==
=== Series overview ===
Season	Episodes	Originally aired	
Season	Episodes	First aired	Last aired
1	52	12 August 2010	2011
2	52	26 August 2013	27 May 2014
3	52	10 July 2019	10 October 2020

=== Season 1 (2010–11) ===
No.	Title	Written by	Storyboard by	Original release date
1	"Man Trap"	Jimmy Hibbert	Christian Choquet	12 August 2010
Shere Khan takes an opportunity to hunt down Mowgli after he lures Baloo in a man trap. Mowgli gets Kaa's help to pull Baloo out whilst Mowgli wards off Shere Khan with a flaming branch.
2	"Wild Black Bees"	Jimmy Hibbert	Christian Choquet	19 August 2010
After straying away from Baloo's teaching, Mowgli encounters a giant nest of wild black bees. He uses this place to get back at Shere Khan for picking a fight with Baloo and Bagheera.
3	"Itchy Twitchy Kaa!"	Diane Redmond	Christian Choquet	26 August 2010
Kaa is itching as he sheds his skin and is in a bad mood. The Banderlogs imprison Mowgli and Shere Khan is prowling for him, but Kaa with Bagheera and Baloo come to the rescue.
4	"The Race"	Jimmy Hibbert	Christian Choquet	2 September 2010
The Wolf Pack is having some doubts about Mowgli, so he challenges Phaona to a race. Mowgli is on the verge of losing the race, but Bagheera manages to keep Mowgli out of trouble.
5	"Monkey Queen"	David Richard Fox	Bernard Legall; Christian Choquet	9 September 2010
A monkey called Masha steals Baloo's glasses proclaiming herself Queen of the Jungle and impressing the Banderlogs. Mowgli tries to get the glasses back, while Shere Khan follows him.
6	"Sleeping Python"	David Richard Fox	Christian Choquet	TBA
Mowgli strongly believes his lucky charm is the key to victory. He drops the charm and Kaa sleeps on top of it. Mowgli gets it back after a near encounter with Shere Khan but takes back what he said to Bala earlier.
7	"Treasure of Cold Lair"	David Richard Fox	Christian Choquet	TBA
Mowgli meets a Himilayan monkey named Langur. In the absence of Thuu, the leader of black cobras, Mowgli's friends try to guard the Cold Lair against human presence, but Mowgli and Langur take care of them with a ghost act.
8	"Legend of the Giant Claw"	Laura Beaumont; Paul Larson	Christian Choquet	TBA
Loud screeches ring in the jungle, which Baloo says maybe the "Giant Claw" beast, but its just Chil's intensified screeching. Mowgli and Bagheera carry out a plan to prevent Shere Khan from finding out about this.
9	"Fished Out"	Chris Trengove	Christian Choquet	TBA
Baloo and Mowgli go fishing. During a bad fish catch, Baloo is away in the river and later Bagheera with him. With some help from the turtles Oo and Boo, Mowgli prevents them from plunging down a waterfall.
10	"Kite Flight"	David Richard Fox	Christian Choquet	TBA
Chil the Kite takes away Lali and Mowgli from the middle of a stream. He warns and takes Mowgli to a danger that poses by the stream and helps the wolves against a huge black cobra.
11	"Mowgli's Log"	Rachel Murrel	Patrick George	TBA
While swimming, Mowgli is captured by Jacala for his little crocs' meal. Baloo manages to stall them while Bagheera summons Hathi to help.
12	"Who is the Bravest?"	David Richard Fox	Christian Choquet	TBA
Mowgli fancies himself as the bravest in the jungle, but he carelessly falls down a well. Tabaqui helps him out for Shere Khan, but Hathi arrives to help Mowgli.
13	"The Waterfall"	David Richard Fox	Isabelle Python; Christian Choquet	TBA
Shere Khan nabs Baloo and Bagheera, but before he can get Mowgli, Mowgli is carried by a storm down the river closing in on a waterfall, but he manages to rescue himself and Tabaqui.
14	"Darzi's Waterfall Rescue"	Diane Redmond	Christian Choquet	TBA
Lali and Mowgli avoid Shere Khan as he follows their trail. Darzi passes a message to summon Baloo and Raksha to rescue the two as they have a tricking fight with Shere Khan.
15	"Mowgli's Sparklie"	Diane Redmond	Christian Choquet	TBA
Mowgli finds a golden scarab which he and Lali both like. They then compete with the Banderlogs and Shere Khan for it. After recovering it, Mowgli tosses the scarab down the waterfall.
16	"Blood Brothers"	Chris Trengove	Christian Choquet	TBA
Tabaqui keeps Lali and Bala occupied to lure Mowgli to them so that Shere Khan can catch him. Daruka summons the wolf pack to drive Shere Khan away.
17	"Survival of the Fittest"	Chris Trengove	Christian Choquet	TBA
Baloo challenges Mowgli to a contest to prove he is fit. By the end of the contest, Baloo gets trapped under logs. Mowgli brings Hathi to free Baloo, motivating him to take regular exercise.
18	"The Day the Earth Shook"	Chris Trengove	Christian Choquet	TBA
An earthquake shakes through the jungle, getting Lali and Bala trapped in their cave. Kaa locates a shaft to exit the cave, which Mowgli and Kaa venture down to retrieve the wolf cubs.
19	"The Jungle Tour"	Annetta Zucchi	Christian Choquet	TBA
Mowgli tries to live alone. He is met by Ponya, a red panda. Mowgli shows Ponya around the jungle trying to keep her out of trouble but needs Baloo and Bagheera's help to save her from poisonous cobras.
20	"Snake Bite"	Jimmy Hibbert	Christian Choquet	TBA
The wolf pack gather, but Akela has been bitten by the Horror Cobra. With Ikii's help, Mowgli obtains a poison cure also having to fend off Phaona's hindrance.
21	"The Bridge"	Jimmy Hibbert	Jeff Galataud	TBA
Appu becomes hotheaded and goes off by himself after Hita wins a contest to see which of their trunks is longer than each other and gets stranded on a pillar in the Banderlog's lair. With the reluctant help of the Banderlogs, Mowgli and his friends build a bridge to rescue Appu.
22	"Phaona's Nasty Trick"	Diane Redmond	Christian Choquet; Frederk Dybowski	TBA
Phaona misleads Mowgli to the Elephant March where Shere Khan is told to find him. Mowgli is late for the wolf council meeting, but Akela realizes Phaona's deceit.
23	"The Wishing Tree"	Annetta Zucchi	Christian Choquet	TBA
Mowgli goes with Tabaqui to the Wishing Tree hoping to be a great hunter. Shere Khan comes for Mowgli, but after a long fight, he manages to scare Shere Khan away.
24	"Is that you Kaa?"	Jimmy Hibbert	Christian Choquet; Jeff Galataud	TBA
While Mowgli gets Kaa's old skin to scare away Tabaqui. Hearing about Mowgli's trick, Shere Khan goes to get him, but the real Kaa saves Mowgli.
25	"The Rubber Ball"	Fred Valion	Christian Choquet; Emmanuel Perez	TBA
Mowgli discovers a rubber ball formed inside a hollow coconut and regards it as his personally. Shere Khan takes the opportunity to get Mowgli, but Bala and Lali save him.
26	"The Cobra's Egg"	Fred Valion	Christian Choquet; Emmanuel Perez	TBA
Tabaqui tricks Mowgli into taking the Mother Cobra's egg. As the Mother Cobra corners Mowgli, Rikki-Tikki-Tavi comes to aid it.
27	"Thirst!"	Chris Trengrove	Christian Choquet; Jeff Galataud	TBA
Shere Khan secures the only source of water in the drying up jungle and will only exchange it for Mowgli. All seems hopeless until it starts raining.
28	"Save The Tiger"	Mark Swift	Joel H. Baugh	TBA
While running from Shere Khan, Mowgli ends up in quicksand and Shere Khan refuses to save him. After Baloo and Bagheera pull him out, Mowgli feels angry, but can he learn to set a better example when Shere Khan is soon in danger himself.
29	"King Kaa"	Chris Otsuki	Christian Choquet; Isabelle Python	TBA
Kaa hypnotizes himself into thinking he is the King of Monkeys, and forces the Banderlog to serve him.
30	"The Red Crocodile"	Kori Rae	Fred Gonzales	TBA
Mowgli takes care of a newly hatched baby crocodile, taking advantage of an old legend to trick the Banderlogs into helping him.
31	"Lucky Star"	Tim Jones	Kenneth Brannagh	TBA
Appu tests his growth using starstones.
32	"Mongoose on the Loose"	David Richard Fox	Emmanuel Perez	TBA
Mowgli tries to help Rikki Tikki Tavi the mongoose regain his strength and his confidence after a fight with the Groundhole Cobra.
33	"River Leaf"	Baptiste Filleul	Christian Choquet; Bich Pham	TBA
Mowgli finds a mirror that has been dropped by a human, and Tabaqui becomes convinced there are more man-cubs lurking in the jungle than he originally thought.
34	"Human After All"	Baptiste Filleul	Laurent Salou	TBA
Tabaqui attacks Mowgli and Rikki Tikki Tavi dives in to save him, but the animals begin to mock Mowgli for lacking bravery.
35	"Monkey Business"	Jimmy Hibbert	Bich Pham	TBA
Mowgli challenges Phaona to a trial of bravery, but the appearance of Mani puts his chances of winning in jeopardy.
36	"Two for the Price of One"	James Mason	Emmanuel Perez	TBA
Phaona complains to the pack that Mowgli is taking a risk by getting close to the man village, and suggests he should be returned there. Akela doesn't agree so Phaona talks Tabaqui into setting a meeting up with Shere Khan whom he tells of his plan to get rid of Mowgli and Akela at the same time.
37	"Cheel and the Mountain Fire"	Diane Redmond	Christian Choquet; Isabelle Python	TBA
Ponya runs for her life when lightning causes a fire in the mountains, and Tabaqui lures her into Shere Kahn's territory.
38	"The Buffaloes"	Frederic Valion	Christian Choquet; Isabelle Python	TBA
Mowgli and Bagheera offer to help a female buffalo find the right berry to cure her sick calf, but Shere Khan plots to get the young animal and the man-cub at the same time.
39	"The Elephant's Secret"	Annetta Zucchi	Christian Choquet	TBA
Shere Khan enlists Tabaqui's help to find the secret Elephant's Valley, where the females go to give birth.
40	"Mowgli's Number One Fan"	Didier Lejuene	Laurent Salou	TBA
Mowgli helps Moky escape from Shere Khan, but becomes trapped himself.
41	"The Wrong Panther"	Annetta Zucchi	Bich Pham	TBA
The rogue black panther, Kala, is back in the jungle and looking for Mowgli.
42	"Mowgli the Artist"	Dodine Grimaldi	Emmanuel Perez	TBA
Mowgli impresses the animals in the jungle when he learns to paint but becomes trapped after helping a little monkey to escape.
43	"Day of the Shadow"	David Richard Fox	Christian Choquet	TBA
Bagheera goes missing, and a strange panther-like creature begins attacking animals in the man village.
44	"Small Is Beautiful"	Chris Trengove	Christian Choquet; Isabelle Python	TBA
Darzee wants to be brave and strong like the other big birds, but they have little faith in her. Mowgli, Baloo, and Bagheera take her with them and soon need her help.
45	"The Tooth of the Matter"	Jimmy Hibbert	Bich Pham	TBA
Mowgli alleviates Jacala the crocodile's toothache before the man-cub is cornered near the river by Shere Khan.
46	"A Real Wolf"	Annetta Zucchi	Emmanuel Perez	TBA
Mowgli undertakes the Mist Valley test to prove he is worthy of being a part of the wolf pack.
47	"Trapped!"	Jimmy Hibbert	Emmanuel Perez	TBA
The Banderlogs are threatened by Shere Khan to steal Mowgli's necklace. Their kidnapped baby Manny however escapes and gets Hathi to deal with Shere Khan.
48	"Bagheera in the Man Village"	Diane Redmond	Laurent Salou	TBA
Green mold is growing in the jungle. Bagheera and Mowgli venture into the man village to procure Cedar Oil, barely managing to get away with it.
49	"Missing Monkey"	Laura Beaumont; Paul Larson	Christian Choquet	TBA
Mowgli and Bagheera try to find a missing monkey and reunite her with her baby.
50	"Best in Class"	James Mason	Emmanuel Perez	TBA
Mowgli becomes jealous of Ponya, and Tabaqui makes use of his envy to lure him into a trap.
51	"The Monster of Cold Lair"	Diane Redmond	Christian Choquet	TBA
Tabaqui comes across Mowgli's meat storage. He scares the Banderlogs but fails to find a hiding place and Shere Khan takes his stolen gain.
52	"Baloo the King"	Diane Redmond	Christian Choquet	TBA
Baloo suffers a bump on the head and becomes convinced he is the king of the jungle.

=== Season 2 (2013–14) ===
No.	Title	Written by	Storyboard by	Original release date
53	"Pavo the Peacock"	Alastair Swinnerton	Christian Choquet	26 August 2013
Mowgli meets a peacock named Pavo, who is ostracized by his kind for his timidness and colorless feathers.
54	"The Bear Facts"	Jimmy Hibbert	Christian Choquet	27 August 2013
Baloo falls for a female bear named Bella, but a jealous Mowgli suspects there is more to her than meets the eye. He discovers that she is working in secret for Shere Khan and trying to separate the two of them.
55	"Mowgli's Cub"	Peter Hymes	Bich Pham	2 September 2013
Mowgli finds a lost tiger cub named Chota and takes him back while trying to find his mother, but Shere Khan comes to believe the cub is a challenger to his place as King.
56	"Mowgli's Ghost"	David Richard Fox	Emmanuel Perez	3 September 2013
When Mowgli falls from a cliff, all the animals believe him dead, and Shere Khan gloats in victory, but Tabaqui begins to see what appears to see the man cub's ghost in the jungle.
57	"Journey to the Nesting Grounds"	James Mason	Christian Choquet	9 September 2013
Mowgli, Bala, and Lali help Ooh and Boo journey to see their babies hatching, all while avoiding the hungry Jacala.
58	"Mowgli The Thief"	Charles Hodges	Christian Choquet	10 September 2013
Bagheera and Baloo find their food in Mowgli's tree, and Ikii spreads a rumor that the man-cub is stealing food from other animals.
59	"Show Me the Honey"	Chris Trengove	Christian Choquet	16 September 2013
Baloo suffers a painful injury after falling from a tree, and Mowgli, Bagheera, and Rikki must grab medicinal honey from Hajeet the bad-tempered badger. Meanwhile, Baloo struggles to survive with both his pain and Darzi's treatments.
60	"Come Fly with Me"	Keith Brumpton	Christian Choquet	17 September 2013
Mowgli wants to fly with Aliona and the cranes on their migration, but Masha and the Banderlogs want to beat him to it.
61	"Truth Or Dare"	Peter Hymes	Christian Choquet	23 September 2013
Tabaqui tricks Bala into daring Mowgli to pluck a whisker from Shere Khan to prove his bravery.
62	"Banzai Bananas"	Christopher Panzner	Christian Choquet	24 September 2013
Mowgli helps Rana, a temperamental wild boar, get back at Masha and the Banderlogs for teasing him by beating them at their own games of trickery.
63	"Who's Laughing Now"	Jonathan Groves	Christian Choquet	30 September 2013
Mowgli accidentally makes fun of Queen Masha and finds himself a prisoner in her kingdom. Also, Kaa is out for revenge on Queen Masha.
64	"Home Wreckers"	Alastair Swinnerton	Christian Choquet	1 October 2013
Kala returns and takes over the Cold Lair, running out the Banderlogs in the process. Mowgli and Masha must reluctantly work together to run out the rogue panther.
65	"The Sun Dance"	Annetta Zucchi	Bich Pham	7 October 2013
Hathi has forgotten how to perform the ancient Sun Dance, and Mowgli and Bagheera must find the turtles, Oo and Boo, to help him remember, or else the sun will disappear forever.
66	"Kitty Kat Khan"	Chris Trengove	Christian Choquet	8 October 2013
After suffering a bump on the head from a fight with Jacala, Shere Khan becomes convinced he is a frightened baby kitten.
67	"SOS Eggs"	Dodine Grimaldi; Alice Guiol	Christian Choquet	14 October 2013
Mowgli crashes into a bird's nest and is then tasked with protecting the birds' eggs from the hungry Kaa.
68	"Mowgli and the Sambar Deer"	Dodine Grimaldi; Alice Guiol	Bich Pham	15 October 2013
Kala is on the hunt for Mowgli and a young deer named ChuChip. Mowgli must protect his new friend, who ends up suffering from weakened eyesight thanks to some berries.
69	"Jackal in Wolf's Clothing"	Keith Brumpton	Christian Choquet	21 October 2013
Tabaqui saves Mowgli and Bala from Shere Khan, earning the trust of the wolf pack. Mowgli tries to uncover Tabaqui and Shere Khan's plot and outsmart them before the pack is put at risk.
70	"Trumpet Trouble"	Nathan Browne	Christian Choquet	22 October 2013
Hita tries to master her grown-up elephant call with Mowgli's help before her herd's coming-of-age ceremony at sundown.
71	"Panther in Distress"	Fred Valion	Bich Pham	28 October 2013
Darzee and Mowgli enter Kala's territory in search of maggots to help cure Bagheera of an infected wound.
72	"Blind as a Bear"	Nicolas Chrestien; Philippe Clerc	Christian Choquet	29 October 2013
Mowgli plays with Baloo's glasses and ends up chasing Tabaqui throughout the jungle right into Shere Khan's trap.
73	"The Python's Hiccups"	Joel Couttausse	Christian Choquet	4 November 2013
Kaa ends up with the hiccups, and Mowgli must help cure him with a blue flower or else he will starve.
74	"The Jungle Champion"	Pascal Stervinou	Christian Choquet	5 November 2013
Tabaqui challenges Mowgli to a series of challenges to see who is the better animal, but it all turns out to be another trap for the man-cub. Mowgli must use strategy when the traitorous jackal needs saving.
75	"The Elephant Call"	David Richard Fox	Bich Pham	11 November 2013
Mowgli sets off to guide three relatives of Hathi's, including their young son Rudy, through the swamp and away from Jacala.
76	"Birthday Fish"	Chris Trengove	Bich Pham	12 November 2013
It's Baloo's birthday and as much as he looks forward to feasting on his favorite bananas, there is something else he prefers: a fish that can only be caught in Shere Khan's territory. Mowgli sets off to find it, but the villainous tiger lies in wait so Bagheera and Baloo realize they must be ready to rescue Mowgli.
77	"Team Work"	Peter Hynes	Laurent Salou	18 November 2013
The pack is set for their annual buffalo hunt, and Akela appoints Mowgli as the leader of his own hunting party. Mowgli must track down a buffalo and deal with sabotage by Phaona or else he can never lead again.
78	"Temple of the Wolf: Part 1"	Alastair Swinnerton	Christian Choquet	24 February 2014
Akela becomes gravely ill, and the only cure is in the ancient Temple of the Wolf. Mowgli and several members of the pack set off to find it while avoiding Phaona's fatal ploys in his attempt to return as Akela's successor.
79	"Temple of the Wolf: Part 2"	Alastair Swinnerton	Christian Choquet	25 February 2014
Mowgli and the pack make it to the temple, but Akela is too weak to enter himself. When Phaona traps them in the temple, Mowgli and the others must find a way to escape and bring their leader the cure.
80	"Birds of a Feather"	Fred Valion	Emmanuel Perez	3 March 2014
Rangoo prepares a fest for the migrating cranes, but all that may be ruined when Mowgli, and later the Banderlogs, come to play on his slippery hill.
81	"Stranded"	Jonathan Groves	Christian Choquet	4 March 2014
Mowgli and Phaona become stranded on a waterfall when avoiding Shere Khan and Jacala. Mowgli and Shere Khan make surprising gestures towards one another when they are in trouble.
82	"Wake Up!"	Nathan Browne	Bich Pham	10 March 2014
Ikii's berries are being stolen, and Mowgli and Bagheera must work together to catch the thief – a sleepwalking Baloo.
83	"Child's Play"	Jimmy Hibbert	Christian Choquet	11 March 2014
Tabaqui uses the remains of a human camp to set a trap for Mowgli by isolating him from the other animals. With help from Appu and Heeta, Mowgli must find a way to avoid Shere Khan and rescue the others.
84	"A Shot in the Dark"	Chris Trengove	Christian Choquet; Elodie Remy	17 March 2014
Mowgli becomes blinded by a flower's pollen, and it is up to Darzi to guide him away from Shere Khan's clutches while Baloo finds a cure.
85	"The Legend of Amber"	Ariane Desrieux; Justine Cheynet	Bich Pham	18 March 2014
Mowgli finds a piece of amber and Baloo tells him of the legend of the power it contains. The amber soon falls into Shere Khan's possession and he declares himself King of the Jungle, ordering his subjects to bring him Mowgli.
86	"Fly Away"	Nathan Browne	Emmanuel Perez	24 March 2014
Mowgli plays with a kite from the human village, which ends up carrying Rikki away. Mowgli and Darzi must save him before he becomes the prey of a passing eagle.
87	"A Nose for Trouble"	Alastair Swinnerton	Bich Pham	25 March 2014
All the animals have colds, and Mowgli must retrieve a cure for them all. Shere Khan attempts to hunt him but is thwarted again and again by Tabaqui coming down with his own cold.
88	"The Voice of Power"	Nathan Browne	Emmanuel Perez	31 March 2014
Shere Khan gains a sore throat, and Masha declares it her doing, taking his place as Ruler of the Jungle. Mowgli and Baloo must bring Shere Khan a remedy before she and the Banderlogs turn the jungle inside out.
89	"Reaching for the Sky"	Justine Cheynet	Christian Choquet	1 April 2014
Ponya is captured by the Bandar-Log to build a structure for Masha and Mowgli must free her by using the idea of a springboard.
90	"The Invisible Man Cub"	Jonathan Groves	Emmanuel Perez	7 April 2014
Mowgli ventures into Shere Khan's territory with Appu and Hita using camouflage to find a mango for a baby elephant that is about to be born.
91	"The Howling Moon"	Alastair Swinnerton	Christian Choquet; Elodie Remy; Bich Pham	8 April 2014
Mowgli must howl at the red moon, but his howling is not good at all. With a trick from Phaona, Mowgli decides to leave the jungle, but then Shere Khan knows and wants to play cat and mouse for one last time.
92	"Shell Game"	Jimmy Hibbert	Christian Choquet	14 April 2014
Mowgli finds a conch shell and starts blowing it for fun but this misleads one of the cranes. Though Mowgli saves her from Jacala just in time, she loses some feathers and now she has to go on foot to reach her destination & Mowgli agrees to take her there safely. Tabaqui is following them, ordered by Shere Khan to catch a prey.
93	"Star Fall"	Peter Hynes	Emmanuel Perez	15 April 2014
Mowgli is looking after Chota while his mother is ill but a meteor passes by and the earth rumbles under its impact so Mowgli tells Chota that making a wish to a fallen star makes it true. In the next morning, Chota is not to be found and Mowgli knows where he might have gone.
94	"Thin Skin"	Jonathan Groves	Christian Choquet	21 April 2014
Mowgli hurts Rana's feelings after he and the monkeys mock his dance during the tamarind season.
95	"Missing Appu"	Fred Valion	Christian Choquet	22 April 2014
A game of hide and seek between Mowgli and the elephants turns into a jungle-wide search for Appu. Hathi searches for him while Mowgli and Hita keep Shere Khan from getting to him first.
96	"Panther Therapy"	Alastair Swinnerton	Christian Choquet; Emmanuel Perez	28 April 2014
Mowgli and Baloo try various strategies to help Bagheera overcome his longtime fear of water before Jacala makes it back to the river.
97	"Tabaqui the Hunter"	Chris Trengove	Christian Choquet; Isabelle Python	29 April 2014
After a fight, Tabaqui and Shere Khan break up. Mowgli offers to teach Tabaqui to hunt as the jackal comes to realize how dependent he is on Shere Khan, and competes with Ikki to get back in his good graces.
98	"Most Beautiful Bird"	Jill Brett	Christian Choquet; Isabelle Python	6 May 2014
Pavo, Rangoo, Aliana, and Hooter compete amongst one another to determine who is the most beautiful bird in the jungle, with Mowgli as the judge. Meanwhile, Tabaqui hatches a plan to snatch all the birds for himself.
99	"Footprints"	Darren Jones	Christian Choquet; Isabelle Python	12 May 2014
Baloo finds a map that shows the way the "Valley of Giants" and Mowgli and Bala decide to go and find it. Mowgli copies the map and shows it to Hathi to see if he has any ideas of where it is. Suddenly, Shere Khan follows them, then Baloo, Akela, and Darzi arrive to rescue Mowgli and Bala.
100	"Super Bird"	Fred Valion	Christian Choquet; Isabelle Python	13 May 2014
Ravi and Vira think that Darzee is a very strong bird. But Baloo doesn't like this as he knows Darzee is reckless and may put herself in harm's way.
101	"Junglewise"	Nathan Browne	Christian Choquet; Bich Pham	19 May 2014
When the bees get after Mowgli while he tries to get some honey very recklessly, Baloo puts Mowgli to the test to see if he is junglewise.
102	"Grudge Match"	Jill Brett	Christian Choquet; Isabelle Python	20 May 2014
Shere Khan and Baloo are in a tiff and Khan takes away a fish from Baloo. Then Shere Khan calls it his treasure, making Baloo very angry so Mowgli and Bagheera go off to find some hidden treasure from Baloo's past when he and Shere Khan were cubs.
103	"The Broken Baton"	Nathan Browne	Christian Choquet	26 May 2014
Appu, Hita, and Mowgli are playing with Hathi's baton but they accidentally break it and have to go find another one before the spring parade.
104	"Rangoo on the Run"	Chris Trengove	Christian Choquet	27 May 2014
It is Masha's birthday and she orders Thuu the cobra to find her a special present. Meanwhile, Baloo wants a mango, but Rangoo takes it away and now Baloo has no other option but to chase down the bird.

=== Christmas special (2018) ===
No.	Title	Written by	Storyboard by	Original release date
1	"Jungle All the Way"	Thomas Hart	Christian Choquet	24 December 2018
A joyful, bright and jolly experience of Christmas in the Seeonee Jungle with Santa, his magic snow, our jungle friends, and Shere Khan.

=== Season 3 (2019–20) ===
No.	Title	Written by	Storyboard by	Original release date
105	"Mowgli, King of the Jungle"	Dominique Debar	Christian Choquet	10 July 2019
When Mowgli claims that he is a part of wolf pack, after rescuing Tabaqui from a trap, Phaona decides to teach him a lesson with Masha's honey that makes Trikki go crazy. Phaona prompts Mowgli to eat the honey after which he starts saying that he is the king of the Jungle. Mowgli makes fun of Baloo and Bagheera which seems odd to them.
106	"Harjit Makes a Move"	Catherine Diran; Stéphane Allegret	Christian Choquet	18 July 2019
When Bagheera gets a very poisonous thorn deep in his paw, Baloo tells Mowgli that the only way to stop the poison from spreading is by using an antidote from Frangipani flowers which can only be found in Harjit's territory.
107	"A Life Lesson"	Fred Valion	Christian Choquet	18 July 2019
Baloo is teaching Mowgli, Bagheera and Chota trick on rescuing themselves from the coils of a snake. Chota sees a spider just above Baloo's head and loses focus when Baloo asks him a question Mowgli comes to Chota's rescue.
108	"Daddy Shere Khan"	Johanna Krawczyk	Laurent Delion	1 October 2019
Nargoo, Rangoo's mate is carrying twigs in his beak for the nest and a gust of wind whips him to and fro. The wind ejects Nargoo and carries both the nest and the Egg. Nargoo and Rangoo realizes that the wind has taken their nest and egg. In the Jungle, the egg is inside the nest which is being carried away with the wind.
109	"The Rumor"	Florence Nizan	Christian Choquet	10 October 2020
When Darzee overhears Hathi and Gajjini talking, she assumes that Hathi is leaving everyone and going away. After Hathi leaves, Gajjini goes over to Baloo and tells him the plan she is planning to surprise Hathi he returns but Darzee couldn't hear this over the noise if wind rattling with the leaves. Baloo sees Darzee and acts ill so that no one can know about their surprise to Hathi.
110	"Hita's Dreams"	Dominique Debar	Christian Choquet	TBA
Mowgli, Bagheera, Trikki, Appu, Hita and Darzee are having fun by playing acrobatics. When Hita is unable to throw the banana, she thinks that she is up to no good as she is heavy and can't fly and wants to be more like the monkey who can easily pass on from one tree to another. Hita leaves the area and Darzee catches up to her and tries to cheer up her, but nothing works.
111	"Not Fair!"	Florence Nizan	Christian Choquet	TBA
It is a dusty morning at the Cold Lair, with cracked coconut shells and banana peels all over the ground. As usual, Masha is barking orders at Mona, Mera and rest of the monkey gang to instill some order and clean up the mess. From afar, Masha sees Mowgli walking down the path with a lot of juicy fruits in his hand.
112	"What's Gotten Into Baloo?"	Dominique Debar	Christian Choquet	TBA
Shere Khan watches the spectacle where Baloo saves Bella from falling off the cliff. Not just that, the bear also saves her honey. Everyone in the jungle seems to think that Bella is a manipulative bear who uses everyone for her own good. Baloo realizes this and leaves.
113	"Mowgli the Soothsayer"	Catherine Diran; Stéphane Allegret	Laurent Delion	TBA
Watching from a distance, Mowgli sees Tabaqui falsely leading Chota on a path. His intentions of taking the tiger cub to Shere Khan as a snack are pretty clear. Mowgli interrupts this plan by asking Tabaqui questions on what he is doing. Tabaqui who is taken aback to find Mowgli there, gets confused, meanwhile Tigress Chanda listens to the conversation and is angry with Tabaqui.
114	"The Nose Knows"	Dominique Debar; Bénédicte Galup	Christian Choquet	TBA
Baloo is taking his usual botany lessons about flowers and their scents and it can be seen that Mowgli doesn't have a good sense of smell whereas Bagheera aces the class because of his senses. On the other hand, Lali and Bala are out playing and trying to annoy Harijit. From a distant view, Kallu is watching everything.
115	"King for a Day"	Dominique Latil	Christian Choquet	TBA
Baloo announces that to celebrate the start of Dry season, the jungle has the contest of King's race. Where the first animal who brings back an entire Lotus to the contest's judge, is crowned King for a Day and a party is organized in his honors. As soon as the news gets out, Mowgli and Bagheera get themselves ready for the race and share some competitive banter against each other.
116	"The Rise of Tabaqui"	Johanna Krawczyk	Christian Choquet	TBA
It is friendship's day in the Jungle; all the animals are very excited as friendship day calls for a party. Masha and her monkeys are organizing the party and have made banana party for the animals. Tabaqui is lurking in the shadows wanting one of those bananas. On the other hand, Harijit takes two of the bananas from the pyramid and all the Monkeys run behind him.
117	"Rana's Challenge"	Dominique Latil	Christian Choquet	TBA
Rana is known for his clumsiness. His friends keep making fun of him. Just when he thinks he will change this assumption of people, Mucie steals his lunch and runs away. Mowgli is watching all of this and wants to eat as well but he runs behind Mucie and gets Rana's lunch back. While returning the lunch, Mowgli asks Rana if he can share. This kind gesture of asking leaves Rana's friends impressed.
118	"I Am a Wolf"	Johanna Krawczyk	Christian Choquet	TBA
Rana is being chased by an Antelope and he is struck in the wooden bridge whose planks are missing. Antelope is ready to charge at Rana when the wolf pack led by Mowgli arrives and rescues Rana. Masha appears and makes fun of Rana, ashamed of himself Rana wants to be a part of wolf pack.
119	"Warn the Babies"	Florence Nizan	Christian Choquet	TBA
Tabaqui is disappointed when he is unable to catch a field mouse. Wandering aimlessly in the friendly area, he spots Guzzelguts and threatens him. Jacala swaggers from behind and make fun of Tabaqui who is surprised and leaps backwards.
120	"Crocodile Tears"	Catherine Diran; Stéphane Allegret	Marc Perret	TBA
Bagheera can't sleep because the toads keep making noise, Mowgli offers to go and check what's wrong but finds Jacala crying. On asking what's wrong, Jacala says that his children are gone to find the Great Rainbow-Colored Crocodile. Jacala continues by saying that he made that up and the children believed him and decided to look for him.
121	"Hathi Round the Bend"	Fred Valion	Christian Choquet	TBA
Bagheera and Mowgli are racing with each other in the jungle. Tabaqui comes in between and is hit by Bagheera which causes a big bump on Tabaqui's head. Baloo tries to apply Aloe Vera to it but the mere thought of it scares Tabaqui, but a drop of Aloe Vera falls on Tabaqui's head and gives him relief.
122	"A Safe Place to Sleep"	Catherine Diran; Stéphane Allegret	Laurent Delion	TBA
Mowgli, Baloo and Bagheera are in the friendly area, where Baloo examines the tree trunk where they usually sleeps. Baloo says that the tree is covered in fungus and is suffocating the tree, he continues by saying that they should probably find another place to sleep for the night. Mowgli goes pale and Bagheera tries to console him.
123	"Forbidden Friendship"	Johanna Krawczyk	Christian Choquet	TBA
Mowgli along with Baloo and Bagheera has formed a strange pyramid against a banana tree to grab a large bunch of bananas. Guzzelguts and Trikki crashes into Baloo and the pyramid collapses. Guzzelguts and Trikki rush to help Mowgli Baloo and Bagheera. Mowgli is happy to sees Trikki and Guzzelguts friendship.
124	"Jungle Day-Care"	Dominique Debar; Bénedicte Galup	Arnold Gransac	TBA
Harjit is dozing blissfully when Chupchip and Trikki plays a prank on him by keeping a mango just outside the entrance of his burrow. Just as he was about to take a bite, they whisked mango under his nose. Harjit gets annoyed and shouts at both of them for playing tricks. They both starts laughing.
125	"The Jungle Investigation"	Florence Nizan	Christian Choquet	TBA
Mowgli and Bagheera learn that by following the tracks of an animal, a lot can be learn about them. Amidst the lesson, Baloo also tells them that it's not just tracks but all animal droppings that help in understanding what the animal eats, where it goes and a lot more.
126	"Such Soft Flakes"	Dominique Debar	Marc Perret	TBA
Ponya has come to say good bye to Baloo, Bagheera and Mowgli as she is leaving to the mountains and will come back only after winter. Ponya talks about the winter on the mountain and describes snowflakes and its scenery. Mowgli is fascinated and wants to go see them with Ponya and experience the beauty of snow.
127	"Hunt for the Hypnotist"	Catherine Diran; Stéphane Allegret	Christian Choquet	TBA
Mowgli is back with three big fishes after fishing and is very pleased. He shows it to Baloo and Bagheera sitting by the river bank with excitement, only to find that both of them are responsive and staring into the distance fixedly. Mowgli tries everything but they don't move. Vira informs that it was Kaa who hypnotized the two into sitting there.
128	"The Honey Galore"	Florence Nizan	Christian Choquet	TBA
Tabaqui is down with cold and goes looking for Baloo for some honey to cure the cold. Mowgli is irritated to see that everything in the jungle is disrupted - the fruits aren't growing fully - because several swarms of bees have disappeared. Baloo cures Tabaqui with the little honey he has left.
129	"A Strange Twin"	Catherine Diran; Stéphane Allegret	Miguel De Lalor	TBA
Laughing over a trick Mowgli plays on Kaa by drawing a face on Kaa's tail that leads Kaa into believing that his tail is his brother, Kallu tells Tabaqui that he can imitate Man cubs voice. The two of them use this to plot a plan to set a trap for Mowgli. At first Mowgli refuses to believe that there is another man cub in the jungle and dismisses it as a mistake by Tabaqui.
130	"Deceit"	Fred Valion	Jean-Charles Finck	TBA
While chasing an antelope for lunch, Bagheera sprains his paw by falling into a hole and ends up losing the antelope. The wolves end up catching the antelope and enjoy the feast. Baloo and Mowgli ask Bagheera to rest as he is tired and injured. He however dreams of food.
131	"The Lucky Plant"	Johanna Krawczyk	Laurent Delion	TBA
Ravi sets off to get the lucky plant for his egg. Suddenly a gust of wind injures his wing and he goes into a downward spin. Vira gets worried for Ravi as he's gone a long time and takes Mowgli and Cheel's help. Mowgli sets off with Vira and Cheel to find Ravi while not knowing that Shere Khan is following them.
132	"The Fake Invalid"	Johanna Krawczyk	Christian Choquet	TBA
Everyone in the Jungle seems to be ill including Shere Khan. On the other hand, Rikki wants to tell everybody how he won a showdown and got the dragon fruit but nobody seems to listen to him. He feels saddened to see that nobody shares his excitement or is happy for him. Hence he fakes an illness when Baloo seems to care a little.
133	"The Disciple"	Dominique Latil	Christian Choquet	TBA
While helping getting rid of weeds for Chanda and Chota, Mowgli accidentally rubs his eyes which makes him go blind temporarily. Baloo takes Mowgli to Anupam who teaches Mowgli using his other senses to protect himself. Shere Khan takes advantage of the situation and attacks Mowgli. Mowgli saves himself and others by using the lessons he Lent from Anupam. Baloo cures Mowgli from the herbs.
134	"When The Jungle Sleeps"	Catherine Diran; Stéphane Allegret	Laurent Delion	TBA
Mowgli and Bagheera notices that everybody's asleep in the jungle. To save the animals from the wrath of Shere Khan, Mowgli and Bagheera decides to investigate. They follow the smoke and finds that it's coming from the human village. The villages are burning Jimsonweed which is causing the animals to fall asleep. Before Mowgli could go and extinguish the fire, the smoke stops.
135	"Tiger Medicine"	Fred Valion	Miguel De Lalor	TBA
While Mowgli and Kaa were hanging, Kaa gets allergic to brown berries and the only remedy Kaa could think of is eating a tiger. Mowgli tries to stop him and asks Baloo's help for an alternative remedy. Baloo sets out to seek the remedy from Thuu. Meanwhile, Mowgli warns Shere Khan about Kaa but he doesn't pay any attention towards him.
136	"Chuchip The Adventurer"	Florence Nizan	Christian Choquet	TBA
While a storm is brewing in the jungle, Baloo sends Bagheera on a surveillance mission to let of the steam and Mowgli to return Chuchip safely home. Mowgli and Chuchip took a detour and ended up in Jacala's territory. Chuchip got struck in the mud. Jacala along with Guzzelguts and Colin tries to make lunch out of Chuchip.
137	"Shere Khan Makes a Comeback"	Catherine Diran; Stéphane Allegret	Diego Zamora	TBA
Tabaqui comes up with a devious plan on making everyone believe that Shere Khan is dead when he sees some bones in the jungle. Tabaqui and Kallu tells everyone that Shere Khan is dead so that Shere Khan can have a feast when everyone's thinking that he's dead. Baloo takes a bone to examine it.
138	"The Six Legged Spider"	Dominique Debar	Marc Perret	TBA
The monkeys face the tragedy of crisis as they scatter all over the jungle when they see that a six legged spider has taken over their territory. The other animals refuse to believe the Bandar log, claiming it to be one of their many tricks. Mowgli worries about the monkeys and decides to help Trikki, who is unable to find his friends after the spider entered their territory.
139	"A Tiny World"	Catherine Diran; Stéphane Allegret	Christian Choquet	TBA
All the animals in the jungle complain about itching all over their bodies from being severely stung by bees (a lot often than normal). Many animals, irritated from this situation decide to leave the jungle.
140	"Monkey See, Monkey Do"	Florence Nizan	Christian Choquet	TBA
As usual the entire area of Cold Lair is untidy with piles of fruits and branches. Masha irritated from the mess starts ordering people around. All monkeys irritated from being ordered around make fun of her. And Trikki is nowhere to be seen which worries Illa. Trikki has gone to Langur to complain about how Masha gives strict orders.
141	"The Power of Song"	Johanna Krawczyk	Laurent Delion	TBA
Nargoo chooses Baloo as replacement for a singer in their team as Rangoo has fallen ill. As they prepare for the summer festival, Veera, Ravi and Mowgli among other point out that Baloo doesn't exactly have a melodious sweet voice for him to be a singer. This upsets Baloo, who determined to prove that he is a good singer. Baloo decides to go someplace private and practice the song.
142	"Pavo The Bold"	Johanna Krawczyk	Miguel De Lalor	TBA
Pavo the peacock suddenly decides to go off on a dangerous adventure so that he can prove to his friends that he is a bold peacock. Mowgli and Bagheera realize that this could get Pavo in a lot of trouble, so they organize a treasure hunt for a special mango so that Pavo can both go off on an adventure but also be safe about it.
143	"Master Mowgli"	Catherine Diran; Stéphane Allegret	Christian Choquet	TBA
Shere Khan seems to have become weaker and has trouble hunting for preys as he has gained weight. Kallu and Tabaqui see this and realize that its time they look for a new master as Shere Khan has lost touch. While trying to find a new master the duo come across Mowgli and realize that Mowgli is the right choice for a master. Baloo and Bagheera warn Mowgli for teaming with Kallu and Tabaqui.
144	"All Together"	Dominique Debar	Christian Choquet	TBA
All the animals seem to be showing off their special skills, but due to jealousy and competitiveness they end up fighting as each one of them wishes to prove they are the best. Mowgli explains this to Baloo, who gets an idea for a competition. Hence he asks everyone to be present at dawn. Baloo calls for a race next morning.
145	"Bagheera's Slam"	Johanna Krawczyk; Ludovic Lefebvre	Christian Choquet	TBA
Bagheera has trouble reciting the names of various known constellations. Baloo warns him that it's very important to remember them and that he must try harder. Tired of not being able to remember, Bagheera refuses Mowgli's help and composes a song on all of the names. He starts slamming and singing the poem and is delighted when Masha praises him for his slamming skills.
146	"Mowgli's Magic Stick"	Fred Valion	Laurent Valion	TBA
Baloo, Mowgli and Bagheera together go in search of y shaped stick by the banks of the river. The waster has washed with many sticks and Baloo is looking for that kind stick as it will help him find the underground springs. While they find the stick, Mowgli finds a different kind of stick which when thrown comes right back- just like a boomerang.
147	"Phoola's Flight"	Fred Valion	Christian Choquet	TBA
Rumors spread around the jungle that Phoola is the first ever Peacock who can fly very high. At first Phoola is surprised but he likes the praises he receives from fellow peacocks, hence he doesn't deny the rumors. Mowgli knows that the rumors are untrue and asks Phoola to reveal the truth to all the animals in the Jungle.
148	"Love at First Sight"	Johanna Krawczyk	Christian Choquet	TBA
Mowgli sees that Alyona is sad that the entire flock of cranes left without her for migration and she cannot take the journey alone as its very dangerous. Mowgli decides to help Alyona find home till the flock returns. In their hunt for a good home, Alyona ends up smelling mandrake flowers which cause hallucinations.
149	"Jungle Jangle"	Catherine Diran; Stéphane Allegret	Christian Choquet	TBA
Mowgli feels bad when he is not allowed to attend the monkey's party, despite vigorous attempts. He hears Rikki play music and decides to form a band. While looking for other band mates, he sees that Tabaqui sings very well and decides to let him join the band. Kallu pressurizes Tabaqui to use this as a trap for Mowgli.
150	"The Big Clean Up"	Fred Valion	Christian Choquet	TBA
Baloo teaches Mowgli and the others that every animal has a purpose in the Jungle and that the worst species to fear is actually the man- as they are detractors. While teaching, they come across a white langur, who introduces himself as Kaphal.
151	"He's the Worst"	Dominique Latil	Christian Choquet	TBA
Tabaqui and Kallu are having a fight over who is a better hunter when they both discover that Shere Khan has left the jungle for a few days to hunt for food. Two of them feel bad about not being able to hunt without Shere Khan. Amidst their tiff, the two realize that there is a lot of hustle bustle taking place in the Jungle.
152	"The Snake Charmers"	Johanna Krawczyk	Laurent Delion	TBA
Kaa faces the consequences of hypnotizing two monkeys; all hell breaks loose when the entire gang gets involved; Shere Khan strikes again, only to be driven away.
153	"A Real Little Mowgli"	Fred Valion	Christian Choquet	TBA
Mowgli hears a bird asking for help, he sees that it's a Paala pitta trapped in a bamboo cage. Mowgli lets him free. However Bagheera reveals to him that Baloo trapped the bird to protect him. Feeling bad for putting the Paala Pitta in danger by letting him free, Mowgli asks Darzee to pretend to be a Paala Pitta in the cage till he returns with the actual bird.
154	"Twice Upon a Time"	Catherine Diran; Stéphane Allegret	Christian Choquet	TBA
Baloo narrates an engrossing story about a Man cub- the hero who goes through several dangerous adventures and ends up saving the day to Mowgli, Tabaqui, Rikki and all the other animals. Right near the climax, Baloo breaks the class and promises to continue the story the next day. Mowgli who was so engrossed in the story looks for the next day. Baloo wants to sleep and hence tires to end the story.
155	"Combing the Jungle"	Florence Nizan	Christian Choquet	TBA
Mowgli not only invokes the wrath of Shere Khan but also upsets Kaa by taking away a wide-toothed comb as a gift for Baloo.
156	"Call Me a Peacock"	Dominique Latil	Christian Choquet	TBA
Masha uses a special reed which imitates a peacock's cry. She sues this to trap Phoola for the peacock feather bed that she wishes to have. However Ponya unknowingly picks up the reed and walks away. Masha threatens the monkeys to find the thief. Ponya runs to Mowgli and Bagheera as all the Monkeys are behind her.

== See also ==
- List of Indian animated television series
