= Paul Greenberg (comedian) =

Canadian comedy writer, producer, actor and comedian

- Occupations: Writer; producer; actor; comedian; voice actor
- Years active: 1993–present
- Spouse: Jackie Harris Greenberg
- Awards: Primetime Emmy Award; two Writers Guild of America Awards

Paul Greenberg is a Canadian comedy writer, producer, actor, comedian and voice actor. He was a founding member of the Toronto sketch-comedy troupe The Vacant Lot and later became a television writer and producer whose work has included the Tony Awards, the Academy Awards, The Ellen DeGeneres Show, Weakest Link and the sitcom Return of the Mac.

Greenberg won a Primetime Emmy Award for special material written for The 63rd Annual Tony Awards and received three additional Emmy nominations for subsequent Tony Awards broadcasts. He also won Writers Guild of America Awards for The 66th Annual Tony Awards and the 2020 revival of Weakest Link. Greenberg has had long-running creative associations with Neil Patrick Harris and Jim Carrey.

== Career ==
Greenberg began his career performing sketch comedy in Toronto. He formed The Vacant Lot with Rob Gfroerer, Nick McKinney and Vito Viscomi. The troupe developed original material while performing at Toronto venues including the Rivoli. A 1994 profile by comedy critic Andrew Clark praised the group's writing. Greenberg, Gfroerer, McKinney and Viscomi served as the writers and performers of the troupe's television series, The Vacant Lot. The six-episode sketch series aired on CBC Television in Canada and was subsequently broadcast by Comedy Central in the United States. Greenberg and the other members of the troupe received a 1995 Gemini Award nomination for Best Writing in a Comedy or Variety Program or Series for an episode of The Vacant Lot.

After The Vacant Lot, Greenberg worked as a sketch and character performer in American film and television. He played multiple roles on MTV's The Jenny McCarthy Show and VH1's Random Play. Greenberg also performed in Los Angeles with actress and comedian Jackie Harris Greenberg, his wife. Both appeared in Andy Prieboy's musical comedy White Trash Wins Lotto. The production was developed during a three-year residency at Largo in Los Angeles. An LA Weekly profile described Greenberg as "an excellent physical comedian". They later appeared together at SF Sketchfest in Don't Say... with Paul and Dave, a live comedy show.

=== Television writing and producing ===
Greenberg increasingly moved from performance into television writing and producing. By the mid-2000s, his credits included consulting and producing work on Viva La Bam, Blue Collar TV, The Reality Show, Party @ the Palms, the MTV Movie Awards and other comedy and variety programming. The Academy of Motion Picture Arts and Sciences has credited Greenberg's television work as including The Ellen DeGeneres Show, the Primetime Emmy Awards and the People's Choice Awards.

Greenberg developed a long-running professional relationship with actor Neil Patrick Harris, who has stated that Greenberg has been his go-to awards-show writer throughout their working relationship. Greenberg wrote special material for the 63rd Tony Awards, hosted by Harris, and won the 2010 Primetime Emmy Award for Outstanding Writing for a Variety, Music or Comedy Special. He received further nominations in the corresponding variety-special writing category for the 65th, 66th and 67th Tony Award ceremonies. Greenberg was part of the team which received the Writers Guild of America award for Comedy/Variety—Music, Awards, Tributes—Specials for their work on the 66th Awards. Greenberg was one of Harris's writing team for the 87th Academy Awards. Greenberg also collaborated with Jim Carrey during the development of Carrey's character material for Sonic the Hedgehog 3.

Greenberg co-created, wrote, produced and appeared in the paranormal-comedy series International Ghost Investigators: Hollywood Division with David Anthony Higgins. The series aired on DirecTV's Audience network. In 2016, Pop ordered Return of the Mac, a scripted comedy starring Joey McIntyre. Greenberg co-created the series and served as an executive producer and writer. The show premiered in 2017 and ran for eight episodes. Greenberg was a writer on NBC's revival of Weakest Link. In 2021, its writing team won the Writers Guild of America Award for Quiz and Audience Participation.

== Awards and nominations ==
Awards and nominations
Year	Award	Category	Work	Result
1995	Gemini Award	Best Writing in a Comedy or Variety Program or Series	The Vacant Lot	Nominated
2010	Primetime Emmy Awards	Outstanding Writing for a Variety, Music or Comedy Special	The 63rd Annual Tony Awards	Won
2012	Primetime Emmy Awards	Outstanding Writing for a Variety Special	The 65th Annual Tony Awards	Nominated
2013	Primetime Emmy Awards	Outstanding Writing for a Variety Special	The 66th Annual Tony Awards	Nominated
2013	Writers Guild of America Awards	Comedy/Variety—Music, Awards, Tributes—Specials	The 66th Annual Tony Awards	Won
2014	Primetime Emmy Awards	Outstanding Writing for a Variety Special	The 67th Annual Tony Awards	Nominated
2021	Writers Guild of America Awards	Quiz and Audience Participation	Weakest Link	Won

Sources: Television Academy, Writers Guild of America, Writers Guild of America East, Playback and Gale.

== Selected filmography ==
=== Film ===
Year	Title	Role	Notes
1995	Tommy Boy	Skittish student	
1997	As Good as It Gets	Bar waiter	
1998	The Wacky Adventures of Ronald McDonald: Scared Silly	Fry Kid No. 2	Voice; direct-to-video
1999	Thumb Wars	Prissypeo	Voice; short film
2001	Jimmy Neutron: Boy Genius	Yolkian guard	Voice
2006	The Ant Bully	Sleeping ant; lice	Voice
2016	Yo-kai Watch: The Movie	Bear Bernstein; Bronzlow; Manjimutt; Dandoodle; Happierre	Voice
2019	Invader Zim: Enter the Florpus	Poonchy	Voice

=== Television acting and voice roles ===
Year(s)	Title	Role	Notes
1994	The Vacant Lot	Various characters	Writer and performer; six episodes
1997–1998	The Jenny McCarthy Show	Various characters	
1998	The Wild Thornberrys	Barno	Voice
1999	Stark Raving Mad	Yuppie	
2000	Curb Your Enthusiasm	Dinner guest	Episode: "Porno Gil"
2000	Growing Up Brady	Davy Jones	Television film
2001	Time Squad	Edgar Allan Poe	Voice
2001	Buffy the Vampire Slayer	Shempy vampire	Episode: "Bargaining, Part One"
2001–2003	Invader Zim	Various voices	
2002	As Told by Ginger	Naked mole-rat expert	Voice; also writer
2002–2005	The Adventures of Jimmy Neutron, Boy Genius	Ooblar; Brobot; man on television	Voice
2005–2006	Reno 911!	Scott Greenberg	Three episodes
2007	All Grown Up!	Racine	Voice
2008–2011	Back at the Barnyard	Various voices	
2008–2009	The Mr. Men Show	Mr. Bump; Mr. Quiet	Voice
2010–2019	The Jungle Book	Daruka; Phaona	Voice
2013–2015	International Ghost Investigators: Hollywood Division	Paul	Co-creator, writer and producer
2014–2018	Yo-kai Watch	Bear Bernstein; Manjimutt; various characters	Voice

=== Selected writing and producing ===
Year(s)	Title	Credit
1994	The Vacant Lot	Co-creator, writer and performer
1999	Random Play	Writer and performer
2003–2005	Viva La Bam	Creative and story consultant
2004–2005	Blue Collar TV	Co-producer
2005	The Reality Show	Producer
2005	Party @ the Palms	Producer
2009	The 63rd Annual Tony Awards	Special material writer
2011	The 65th Annual Tony Awards	Special material writer
2012	The 66th Annual Tony Awards	Special material writer
2013	The 67th Annual Tony Awards	Special material writer
2013–2015	International Ghost Investigators: Hollywood Division	Co-creator, writer, producer and performer
2015	87th Academy Awards	Special-material writing team
2017	Return of the Mac	Co-creator, executive producer and writer
2020	Weakest Link	Writer
