= List of Kyo Kara Maoh! media =

Kyo Kara Maoh! is a series of light novels written by Tomo Takabayashi and illustrated by Temari Matsumoto. It has been adapted into an anime and manga series.

== Light novels ==
Written by Tomo Takabayashi with illustrations by Temari Matsumoto. The first novel was released in November 2000 and so far there are 22 volumes in the series. 17 are considered to be main story novels and the other 5 are extras and side stories which provide background and other information to the story.

No.	Title	Japanese release date	Japanese ISBN
01	Kyou Kara MA no Tsuku Jiyuugyou! (今日から㋮のつく自由業!)	November 2000	978-4-04-442001-7
For short it's called "Kyou MA" 「今日マ」. It is covered in episodes 1-3 of the anime and chapters 1-10 (or volumes 1 and 2) of the manga. It was re-released in September 2001 with ISBN 978-4-04-445201-8.
02	Kondo wa MA no Tsuku Saishuu Heiki! (今度は㋮のつく最終兵器!)	April 2001	978-4-04-442002-4
For short "Kondo MA" 「今度マ」. It is covered in episodes 3-7 of the anime and chapters 11-22 (volumes 2-4) in the manga. It was re-released in September 2001 with ISBN 978-4-04-445202-5.
03	Konya wa MA no Tsuku Daidassou! (今夜は㋮のつく大脱走!)	November 2001	978-4-04-445203-2
For short "Konya MA" 「今夜マ」. It is covered in episodes 12-15 of the anime and chapters 24-34 (volumes 5-6) in the manga.
04	Ashita wa MA no Tsuku Kaze ga Fuku! (明日は㋮のつく風が吹く!)	February 2002	978-4-04-445204-9
For short "Ashita MA" 「明日マ」. It is covered in episodes 21-24 of the anime and chapters 35-47 (volumes 7-8) in the manga.
Ex.1	Kakka to MA no Tsuku TOSA Nikki!? (閣下と㋮のつくトサ日記!?)	May 2002	978-4-04-445205-6
For short "Kakka MA" 「閣下マ. Gunter's journal. It is a collection of 3 stories. One of the stories "Ja ja kuma narashi" 「じゃじゃクマならし」 became episode 18 in the anime, and chapters 48-50 (half of volume 9) in the manga. The title is a reference to Ki no Tsurayuki's Tosa Nikki.
05	Kitto MA no Tsuku Hi ga Noboru! (きっと㋮のつく陽が昇る!)	September 2002	978-4-04-445206-3
For short "Kitto MA" 「きっとマ」.
06	Itsuka MA no Tsuku Yuugureni! (いつか㋮のつく夕暮れに!)	December 2002	978-4-04-445207-0
For short "Itsuka MA" 「いつかマ」
07	Ten ni MA no Tsuku Yuki ga Mau! (天に㋮のつく雪が舞う!)	May 2003	978-4-04-445208-7
For short "Ten MA" 「天マ」
08	Chi ni wa MA no Tsuku Hoshi ga Furu! (地には㋮のつく星が降る!)	June 2003	978-4-04-445209-4
For short "Chi MA" 「地マ」
S.1	Ojousama to wa Kari no Sugata! (お嬢様とは仮の姿!)	September 2003	978-4-04-445210-0
For Short "Ojousama" 「お嬢様」. Set in world war 2 Germany. The Ojousama is a temporary character. She is a treasure hunter named April Graves. She is called to pick up a box called "mirror at the bottom of the sea" from the possessions from her dead mother, Hazel Graves, who was taken away by Nazis. While rushing to investigate the box, April runs into a Nazi, Richard Deuter, who calls himself the key to the box. It is the only title in the series without MA ㋮ in it.
09	Mezase MA no Tsuku Umi no Hate! (めざせ㋮のつく海の果て!)	April 2004	978-4-04-445211-7
For short "Meza MA" 「めざマ」
Ex.2	Musuko wa MA no Tsuku Jiyuugyou!? (息子は㋮のつく自由業!?)	April 2004	978-4-04-445212-4
For short "Musuko MA" 「息子マ」. Three short stories about the Shibuya family. One of the stories "Otouto" 「弟」 became episode 42 in the anime.
10	Kore ga MA no Tsuku Daiippo! (これが㋮のつく第一歩!)	September 2004	978-4-04-445213-1
For short "Kore ga MA" 「これがマ」
11	Yagate MA no Tsuku Uta ni Naru! (やがて㋮のつく歌になる!)	December 2004	978-4-04-445214-8
For short "Yagate MA" 「やがてマ」
12	Takara wa MA no Tsuku Tsuchi no Naka! (宝は㋮のつく土の中!)	August 2005	978-4-04-445215-5
For short "Takara MA" 「宝マ」
13	Hako wa MA no Tsuku Mizu no Soko! (箱は㋮のつく水の底!)	April 2006	978-4-04-445216-2
For short "Hako MA" 「箱マ」
Ex.3 (Kumahachi Special)	Kyo Kara MAou!? (今日から㋮王!?)	November 14, 2006	978-4-04-900782-4
For short "MAou" 「マ王」 There were two versions of this book put out. The special version came, additionally to the 5 short stories, with a 5.5 cm tall kumahachi doll and a pamphlet with an extra story "Kumahachi Special" 「クマハチ・スペシャル」.
Ex.3 (normal version)	Kyo Kara MAou!? (今日から㋮王!?)	November 30, 2006	978-4-04-445217-9
For short "MAou" 「マ王」 There were two versions of this book put out. The normal version has 5 short stories.
14	Suna wa MA no Tsuku Michi no Saki! (砂は㋮のつく途の先!)	December 2007	978-4-04-445218-6
For short "Suna MA" 「砂マ」
15	Kokyou he MA no Tsuku Kaji wo Tore! (故郷へ㋮のつく舵をとれ!)	May 2008	978-4-04-445220-9
For short "Kuni MA" while its written out "Kokyou MA" 「故郷マ」 the author wishes that it be pronounced "kuni MA" 「くにマ」.
Ex.4	Shin MA Koku Yori Ai wo Komete (眞㋮国より愛をこめて)	July 2008	978-4-04-445219-3
Seven short stories focusing on Shinou and the Daikenja.
16	Mae wa MA no Tsuku Tetsugoushi! (前は㋮のつく鉄格子!)	December 27, 2008	978-4-04-445221-6
For short "Mae MA" 「前マ」
17	Ushiro wa MA no Tsuku Ishi no Kabe! (後は㋮のつく石の壁!)	January 1, 2010	978-4-04-445222-3
18	Yami ni MA no Tsuku Hi ga Tomoru!! (闇にマのつく灯がともる！)	(pending)	—

== Manga ==
The manga is released under the title Kyou Kara MA no Tsuku Jiyuugyou! in Japan. It is currently serialized in Asuka, a monthly magazine. Its production started in July 2005.

An English-language version of the manga was licensed by Tokyopop under the title Kyo Kara Maoh! and they released the first seven volumes but Tokyopop has since given up the license. Viz Media re-released the seven volumes of the series digitally under its Viz Select line.

No.	Original release date	Original ISBN	English release date	English ISBN
1	December 28, 2005	978-4048539128	October 2008	1-4278-1099-0
2	July 28, 2006	978-4048539746	January 2009	1-4278-1100-8
3	April 28, 2007	978-4048540872	April 2009	1-4278-1101-6
4	December 28, 2007	978-4048541411	August 2009	1-4278-1545-3
5	April 28, 2008	978-4048541664	December 2009	1-4278-1634-4
6	September 28, 2008	978-4048542418	April 2010	1-4278-1635-2
7	March 28, 2009	978-4048543033	August 2010	1-4278-1762-6
8	September 28, 2009	978-4048543767	—	—
9	March 18, 2010	978-4048544436	—	—
10	September 23, 2010	978-4048545334	—	—
11	February 27, 2011	978-4048545914	—	—
12	July 22, 2011	978-4048546669	—	—
13	December 2011	978-4041201015	—	—
14	May 26, 2012	978-4041202616	—	—
15	November 22, 2012	978-4041204689	—	—
16	March 25, 2013	978-4041206539	—	—
17	October 24, 2013	978-4041208564	—	—
18	May 23, 2014	978-4041210765	—	—
19	January 23, 2015	978-4041022160	—	—
20	September 26, 2015	978-4041034354	—	—
21	October 24, 2016	978-4041034361	—	—

== Drama CDs ==
- Kyou Kara MA no Tsuku Jiyuugyou (今日から㋮のつく自由業!)
- Ura MA 3 part work (裏㋮3部作)
  - Ura Kondo wa MA no Tsuku Saishuu Heiki! (裏 今度は㋮のつく最終兵器!)
  - Ura Konya wa MA no Tsuku Daidassou! (裏 今夜は㋮のつく大脱走!)
  - Ura Ashita wa MA no Tsuku Kaze ga Fuku! (裏 明日は㋮のつく風が吹く!)
- Kakka to MA no tsuku Love Nikki!? (閣下と㋮のつくラブ日記!?)
- Ura MA DX! (裏㋮DX!)
- MAou Koutan Special (㋮王降誕☆すぺしゃる)
- Kyou Kara MAou! Seisakoku DX! (今日から㋮王! 聖砂国DX!)
  - Kyou Kara MAou! Seisakoku DX! (outward journey) (今日から㋮王! 聖砂国DX!（往路）)
  - Kyou Kara MAou! Seisakoku DX! (return trip (今日から㋮王! 聖砂国DX!（復路）)

== Anime Fanbooks ==
- Kyou Kara Maou! Daikenkyuu (今日から㋮王! 大研究) December 22, 2005 ISBN 4-04-853928-0
- Kyou Kara Maou! Daikenkyuu 2 (今日から㋮王! 大研究2) December 20, 2006 ISBN 4-04-854073-4
- Kyou Kara Maou! Daikenkyuu 3 (今日から㋮王! 大研究3) May 28, 2009 ISBN 978-4-04-854355-2

== Illustration book ==
- ㋮Illustrations April 8, 2009 ISBN 978-4-04-854297-5

== Information Book ==
- ㋮本 Maru-ma Series Official Fan Book April 24, 2010 ISBN 978-4-04-854464-1

== Radio Show ==
- Kyo Kara Maoh! Shin Makoku Housou Kyoukai (今日からマ王! 眞魔国放送協会（SHK）)

Theme song:

- First Part: BACK2BACK by Mitsuki Saiga feat. JUST
- Second Part: Heart shaped killing emotion by Mitsuki Saiga feat. JUST

Hosts: Mitsuki Saiga (Wolfram), Kouki Miyata (Murata), Takahiro Sakurai (Yuri) (from 7 he was a guest, from 9 he became a host)

Guests

Masako Katsuki(Cheri): Episodes 03, 04, 19, 20, 43, 44

Minami Takayama(Anissina): Episodes 03, 04, 19, 20, 43, 44

Kazuhiko Inoue(Gunter): Episodes 05, 06, 61, 62

Takashi Matsuyama(Dakoskos): Episodes 06, 37, 38

Masanori Takeda(Jozak): Episodes 09, 10, 41, 42

Yumi Kakazu(Miko Shibuya): Episodes 11, 12, 45, 46

Shin-ichiro Miki(The Original King): Episodes 13, 14, 39, 40

Masaki Terasoma(Adalbert): Episodes 15, 16, 57, 58

Keiji Fujiwara(Jose Rodriguez): Episodes 17, 18

Risa Mizuno(Julia): Episode 21

Nozomu Sasaki(The Great Sage/Jeneus): Episodes 23, 24, 55, 56

Emiri Katou(Doria): Episodes 25, 26

Tamaki Nakanishi(Lasagna): Episodes 25, 26

Yukana(Ulrike): Episodes 27, 28

Motoko Kumai(Greta): Episodes 29, 30

Katsuyuki Konishi(Shori Shibuya) Episodes 31, 49, 50

Toshiyuki Morikawa(Conrad/Engiwarudori(極楽鳥)): Episode 34

Hiroko Taguchi(Gisela): Episodes 35, 36

Akio Ōtsuka(Gwendal): Episodes 47, 48

Akira Ishida(Saralegi): Episodes 53, 54

Hiroaki Hirata(Gegenhuber): Episodes 59, 60

== Games ==
Oresama Quest (おれさまクエスト)

Oresama Quest was a PC game released June 23, 2006.

Hajimari no Tabi (はじマりの旅)

Hajimari no Tabi was a PS2 action RPG video game developed and published by Namco Bandai. It was released in Japan on July 27, 2006. There were two versions released. The normal game and a premium box which included a drama CD and a booklet with an original story by Takabayashi Tomo.

Shin Makoku no Kyuujitsu (眞マ国の休日)

Shin Makoku no Kyuujitsu was a PS2 game released September 27, 2007. There were two versions released. The normal game and a limited box which included two figures, a script book and a drama CD.
