= The Bozo Super Sunday Show =

- Bozo: 40 Years of Fun!
- Starring: Bozo the Clown
- Country of origin: United States

Production
- Production locations: Chicago, Illinois
- Running time: 120 minutes (1994–95); 60 minutes (1995–2001)

Original release
- Network: WGN
- Release: September 11, 1994 – July 14, 2001

The Bozo Super Sunday Show is the final version of WGN-TV's 40+ year-old Bozo series, which aired on Sunday mornings for seven seasons. It was taped in Chicago. The lead star of the show was Bozo the Clown, played by Joey D'Auria. The last episode was taped on October 25, 2000 and featured a cameo appearance by Roy Brown as Cooky the Cook, Bozo's sidekick on WGN's previous Bozo series, Bozo's Circus and The Bozo Show.

In 1997, the show was retooled in an effort to make the show qualify for educational requirements.

The final Bozo television taping was the Bozo: 40 Years of Fun! special on June 12, 2001. It aired on July 14, 2001, featuring a guest appearance by singer Billy Corgan, a loyal fan of WGN's Bozo series, who performed Bob Dylan's "Forever Young."

The final rerun of The Bozo Super Sunday Show was broadcast August 26, 2001. Counting both of its predecessors, the Chicago Bozo was the longest-running television adaptation of the Bozo franchise, which was seen in numerous local versions throughout North America. The vast majority of Bozo stations had discontinued their Bozo franchises in the early 1970s, with the exception of a few stations that had revivals in the late 1980s.

WGN-TV's Bozo returned to the airwaves on a two-hour retrospective titled Bozo, Gar and Ray: WGN TV Classics on December 24, 2005. The primetime premiere was #1 in the Chicago market and is rebroadcast annually during the holiday season.

== Characters ==
Character	Actor	Years
Bozo the Clown	Joey D'Auria	1994–2001
Rusty the Handyman	Robin Eurich	1994–2001
Professor Andy	Andy Mitran	1994–2001
Tunia	Michele Gregory	1994–1998
Pepper	Cathy Schenkelberg	1994–1996
