= List of Studio 100 productions =

This is a list of television series produced and owned by Belgian production and distribution group Studio 100 alongside its animation production studios, their subsidiaries and its predecessors.

== Films ==
=== Released ===
Release date	Title	Studio	Co-production with
March 31, 1999	Plop en de Kabouterschat	Studio 100 NV	
December 6, 2000	Plop in de Wolken	Studio 100 NV	
October 25, 2003	Plop en de Toverstaf	Studio 100 NV	
September 29, 2004	K3 en het Magische Medaillon	Studio 100 NV	
December 15, 2004	Plop en Kwispel	Studio 100 NV	
August 3, 2005	Piet Piraat en de Betoverde Kroon	Studio 100 NV	
December 14, 2005	Plop en het Vioolavontuur	Studio 100 NV	
July 26, 2006	K3 en het IJsprinsesje	Studio 100 NV	
October 25, 2006	Piet Piraat en het Vliegende Schip	Studio 100 NV	
December 13, 2006	Plop in de Stad	Studio 100 NV	
October 17, 2007	Plop en de Pinguïn	Studio 100 NV	
December 19, 2007	K3 en de Kattenprins	Studio 100 NV	
March 12, 2008	Samson, Gert en Hotel op Stelten	Studio 100 NV	
October 15, 2008	Anubis en Het Pad der 7 Zonden	Studio 100 NV	
December 10, 2008	Piet Piraat en het Zwaard van Zilvertand	Studio 100 NV	
July 1, 2009	Mega Mindy en het Geheim van haar	Studio 100 NV	
December 9, 2009	Plop en de Kabouterbaby	Studio 100 NV	
December 16, 2009	Anubis en de wraak van Arghus	Studio 100 NV	
December 15, 2010	Mega Mindy en het Zwarte Kristal	Studio 100 NV	
December 21, 2011	Mega Mindy en de Snoepbaron	Studio 100 NV	
March 28, 2012	Plop wordt Kabouterkoning	Studio 100 NV	
December 12, 2012	K3 en de Bengeltjes	Studio 100 NV	
June 26, 2013	Piet Piraat en het Zeemonster	Studio 100 NV	
February 12, 2014	K3 en de Dierenhotel	Studio 100 NV	
September 11, 2014	Maya the Bee	Flying Bark Productions	Studio 100 Film, Buzz Studios, Fish Blowing Bubbles and Screen Australia
September 17, 2015	Blinky Bill the Movie	Flying Bark Productions; Studio 100 Animation	Assemblage Entertainment, Telegael, Screen Australia, Screen NSW, Lusomundo
December 9, 2015	Mega Mindy vs. Rox	Studio 100 NV	
December 17, 2016	Ghost Rockers: Voor Altijd?	Studio 100 NV	
December 10, 2017	K3 Love Cruise	Studio 100 NV	
March 1, 2018	Maya the Bee: The Honey Games	Flying Bark Productions	Studio 100 Film, Buzz Studios, Fish Blowing Bubble, Screen Australia
December 19, 2018	Nachtwacht en De Poort der Zielen	Studio 100 NV	Ketnet
December 18, 2019	Nachtwacht en Het Duistere Hart	Studio 100 NV	Ketnet
December 18, 2019	Vic the Viking and the Magic Sword	Studio 100 Animation; Studio 100 Media	Belvision, SND Groupe M6, ZDF, BNP Paribas Fortis, Dreamwall
May 29, 2020	100% Wolf	Flying Bark Productions	Siamese Pty Ltd.
December 16, 2020	K3 en Dans van de Farao	Studio 100 NV	
April 20, 2021	Maya the Bee: The Golden Orb	Flying Bark Productions	Studio 100 Media, Studio B Animation
November 17, 2022	Mia and me: The Hero of Centopia	Studio 100 Media	Broadvision Services, Hahn Film AG, Studio B Animation

=== Upcoming ===
Release date	Title	Studio	Co-production with
2024	Heidi	Studio 100 Animation	Studio Isar Animation

=== Studio 100 International ===
Title	Release date	Distributor	Notes
Princess Emmy	28 March 2019 (Germany); 30 August 2019 (United Kingdom)	Universum Film; Kaledeoscope Film Distribution (United Kingdom)	as Studio 100 Media co-production with Studio 100 Film, Witebox, Talking Horse, Animation Fabrik and Red Kite Animation
Vic the Viking and the Magic Sword	18 December 2019 (France); 2 September 2021 (Germany)	Leonine Distribution; SND Films (France)	as Studio 100 Media co-production with Studio 100 Film, Studio 100 Animation, Belvision, SND Films and ZDF
Maya the Bee: The Golden Orb	7 January 2021	StudioCanal	co-production with Studio 100 Film, Studio Isar Animation, Flying Bark Productions and Studio B Animation
Mia and Me: The Hero of Centopia	26 May 2022 (Germany); 27 October 2022 (Australia)	Constantin Film; Icon Film Distribution (Australia)	Final film under the Studio 100 Media name co-production with Studio 100 Film, Flying Bark Productions, Studio Isar Animation, Constantin Film and Studio B Animation
Giants of La Mancha	1 May 2024 (Germany); 8 August 2024 (Argentina)	Constantin Film; GF Films (Argentina)	co-production with Studio 100 Media, Studio Isar Animation, 3Doubles Productions, GF Films, GGVFX and M.A.R.K.13 Film
Heidi: Rescue of the Lynx	3 July 2025	Leonine Distribution; Selecta Vision (Spain)	A feature-length film continuation of Studio 100's Heidi by Studio 100 Animation, Jan Van Rijsselberge and Christel Gonnard; Based on the novel Heidi by Johanna Spyri; First film under the Studio 100 International name co-production with Studio 100 Film, Studio Isar Animation, 3Doubles Producciones and Hotel Hungaria Animation
Arnie & Barney: The Water Quest	2026	TBA	A spin-off of the Maya the Bee franchise by Waldemar Bonsels co-production with Studio 100 Film, Studio Isar Animation, 3Doubles Producciones and Telegael
Dougie Dolittle	2026	TBA	co-production with Studio 100 Film, Studio Isar Animation, 3Doubles Productions and Caligari Film
Halloween vs Day of the Dead	2028	TBA	co-production with Studio 100 Film and Lunch Films

== Television series ==
=== Studio 100 ===
Title	Years	Network	Notes
Samson & Gert	1990–2017	VRT; RTL Nederland (Netherlands)	
Kabouter Plop	1997–2002	VTM	
Wizzy & Woppy	1999–2007	VRT; RTL Nederland (Netherlands)	
Big & Betsy	2000–2003	VTM; Nederland 3 (Netherlands)	
Piet Piraat	2001–2003	Ketnet; Nederland 3 (Netherlands)	
Spring	2002–2008	Ketnet	
Hallo België	2003–2005	VTM	
The World of K3	2003–2013	VTM/VTM Kids; Nederland 3 (Netherlands)	
Bumba	2004–present		
Topstars	2004–2006	Nederland 3 (Netherlands)	
Het Huis Anubis	2006–2009	Nickelodeon Nederlands	
Mega Mindy	2006–2014	Ketnet	
Big & Small	2008–2011	CBeebies (United Kingdom); Treehouse TV (Canada)	co-production with Kindle Entertainment, 3J's Productions (seasons 1–2) and Sixteen South (season 3)
Kerwhizz	2008–2011	CBeebies (United Kingdom)	co-production with BBC In-House Children's Production and Blue Zoo Animation Studio
Amika	2008–2011	Ketnet	
Das Haus Anubis	2009–2012	Nickelodeon Germany	German adaptation of Het Huis Anubis by Anjali Taneja, Hans Bourlon and Gert Verhulst co-production with DED'S It Productions
K2 zoekt K3	2009–2021	VTM; SBS6 (Netherlands)	
Dobus	2009	Ketnet	
Slot Marsepeinstein	2009–2014	Nickelodeon Benelux/Studio 100 TV	
Het Huis Anubis en de Vijf van het Magische Zwaard	2010–2011	Nickelodeon	A sequel to Het Huis Anubis
Florrie's Dragons	2010–2011	Playhouse Disney UK	co-production with Wish Films and Clockwork Zoo
Hallo K3!	2010–2012	VTM	
Piet Piraat Wonderwaterwereld	2010–present	Ketnet; NPO 3/RTL Telekids (Netherlands)	
Bobo	2011	VTMKZoom; RTL Telekids (Netherlands)	co-production with Blink Media
House of Anubis	2011–2013	Nickelodeon UK; Nickelodeon/TeenNick (United States)	British/American adaptation of Heit Huis Anubis by Anjali Taneja, Hans Bourlon and Gert Verhulst co-production with Nickelodeon Productions and Lime Pictures
Galaxy Park	2011–2014	Ketnet; Nederland 3 (Netherlands)	
ROX	2011–2015	Ketnet; RTL Telekids (Netherlands)	
Jabaloe	2012–2013	VTMKZoom; RTL Telekids (Netherlands)	
Hotel 13	2012–2014	Nickelodeon Germany	
Prinsessia	2014–2016	Ketnet	
Ghost Rockers	2014–2017	Ketnet; RTL Telekids & Nickelodeon Benelux (Netherlands)	
K3 zoekt K3	2015	VTM; SBS6 (Netherlands)	
Flin & Flo	2015–2016	VTM	
The Adventures of Lolly Laffalot	2015–2017	VTMKZoom	
Nachtwacht	2015–2020	Ketnet	
K3 Animated	2015–2016	RTL Telekids; M6 (France)	co-production with Studio 100 Animation and Toon Factory
Kosmoo	2016–2018	Studio 100 TV; NPO 3 (Netherlands)	
The Wild Adventures of Blinky Bill	2016–2017	7TWO/ABC Me (Australia)	co-production with Studio 100 Media, Flying Bark Productions, Telegael and Giant Wheel Animation
Nils Holgersson	2017	BR (Germany)	co-production with Studio 100 Animation, ARD and AA Studio; Based on the novel by Selma Lagerlöf
Campus 12	2018–2020	Ketnet; NPO 3 (Netherlands)	
K3 Roller Disco	2018–2020	VTM Kids	
Vegesaurs	2022–present	ABC Kids (Australia); France 5 (France)	co-production with Cheeky Little Media

=== Studio 100 International ===
Title	Years	Network	Notes
The Wild Adventures of Blinky Bill	2016–2017	7TWO/ABC Me (Australia)	co-production with Studio 100, Flying Bark Productions, Telegael and Giant Wheel Animation
Louca	2026	TF1 (France)	co-production with Media Valley and Belvision

==== EM.Entertainment ====
Title	Years	Network	Notes
The Adventures of Blinky Bill	1993–2004	WDR; ABC/Seven Network (Australia)	co-production with Yoram Gross-EM.TV, EM.TV Wavery and WDR
Tabaluga	1997–2004	ZDF; Seven Network (Australia)	co-production with Yoram Gross-EM.TV, ZDF Enterprises and Victory Media Group
Jim Button	1999–2000	Der Kinderkanal; Fox Kids (international); Télévision de Radio-Canada (Canada); TF1 (France)	co-production with Saban International Paris, CinéGroupe, WDR, Ventura Film Distributors B.V. and ARD/Degeto
Flipper and Lopaka	1999–2005	Kika; Seven Network (Australia)	co-production with Yoram Gross-EM.TV, Animation Filmmakers Corporation and Victory Media Group (season 2)
Weird-Ohs	1999–2000	Fox Family (United States); YTV (Canada)	co-production with Decode Entertainment, Mainframe Entertainment and Testor Corporation
Twipsy	1999–2000	Kika	via Junior Produktions GmbH co-production with HaffaDiebold and Estudio Mariscal
Rainbow Fish	2000	ZDF; HBO Family (United States); Teletoon (Canada)	co-production with Sony Wonder Television and Decode Entertainment
Pigs Next Door	2000	Sat.1	co-production with Saban Entertainment and Magma Films
Poochini	2000–2003	Junior; Syndication (United States)	co-production with Wild Brain
Mummy Nanny	2001	Super RTL; France 2 (France)	co-production with Les Cartooneurs Associés; Co-owned with Mediatoon Distribution
Fairy Tale Police Department	2001–2002	Seven Network (Australia)	co-production with Yoram Gross-EM.TV, Talit Communications and Victory Media Group
The World of Tosh	2002–2004	SVT 1	co-production with Happy Life and Magma Films
Staines Down Drains	2006–2007	Seven Network (Australia)	co-production with Flying Bark Productions, Flux Animation Studio, Traction and NZ On Air
Master Raindrop	2008–2009	Seven Network (Australia)	co-production with Flying Bark Productions, Big Communications, Flux Animation Studio and Media Development Authority

==== Made 4 Entertainment (m4e) ====
Title	Years	Network	Notes
Mia and Me	2012–2023	Kika; Rai 2/Rai Gulp/Rai Play (Italy)	co-production with Hahn & m4e Productions (seasons 1–3), Rainbow S.p.A (seasons 1–2), Rai Fiction (seasons 1–2) and March Entertainment (season 1)
Tip the Mouse	2014–2020	Super RTL; Rai YoYo (Italy)	co-production with Studio Campedelli, Studio Bozzetto & Co, Rai Fiction and Giunti Editore
Wissper	2015–2017	Junior; Channel 5 (United Kingdom)	co-production with Absolutely Cuckoo, Telegael, Discreet Art Productions and Bastei Media

===== Telescreen =====
Title	Years	Network	Notes
Ox Tales	1987–1988	VARA; TV Tokyo (Japan)	
Wowser	1988–1989	TV Tokyo	co-production with J.C.Staff
Alfred J. Kwak	1989–1990	VARA; TV Tokyo (Japan); ZDF (Germany); TVE1 (Spain)	co-production with VARA, ZDF, Televisión Española and TV Tokyo
Star Street	1989–1990		
Moomin	1990–1992	VARA; TV Tokyo (Japan); Yle TV1 (Finland); NRK (Norway)	Also known as Tales from Moominvalley; Currently owned by Moomin Characters Ltd
Miffy: The Classic Series	1992–1993	KRO	co-production with Mercis BV, Kodansha and Gene Deitch Studios
Bamboo Bears	1995	NPO 1 Canal J (France); Kids Station (Japan); ZDF (Germany); TVE2 (Spain)	co-production with Marina Productions, ZDF Enterprises and Mitsui
Lizzie McGuire	2001–2004	Disney Channel	inherited from Egmont Imagination co-production with Disney Channel and Stan Ragow Productions; Co-owned with The Walt Disney Company
Miffy and Friends	2003–2005	KRO	co-production with Mercis BV
The Paz Show	2003–2006	CITV (United Kingdom); Discovery Kids (United States)	inheritated from Egmont Imagination co-production with King Rollo Films for Discovery Kids
Frog & Friends	2008	KRO	co-production with Rights at Work, Max Velthuijs Foundation and A. Film Production
Miffy's Adventures Big and Small	2015–2017	KRO-NCRV; Tiny Pop (United Kingdom)	co-production with Mercis BV and Blue Zoo Animation Studio

=== Dedsit ===
Title	Years	Network	Notes
Wij van België	2009	VTM	
Das Haus Anubis	2009–2012	Nickelodeon Germany	German adaptation of Het Huis Anubis by Anjali Taneja, Hans Bourlon and Gert Verhulst co-production with Studio 100
Against the Stairs	2010–2018	VTM	
Komt een Man bij de Dokter	2012–present	SBS6/Amazon Prime Video	co-production with ITV Studios Nederlands

=== Flying Bark Productions ===
Title	Years	Network	Notes
The Adventures of Blinky Bill	1993–2004	ABC/Seven Network	co-production with EM.TV & Merchandising, EM.TV Wavery and WDR
Tabaluga	1997–2004	Seven Network; ZDF (Germany)	co-production with EM.Entertainment, ZDF Enterprises and Victory Media Group
Skippy: Adventures in Bushtown	1998–1999	Nine Network	co-production with Tele Images Productions
Dumb Bunnies	1998–1999	Seven Network; CBS (United States)	co-production with Nelvana and Scholastic
Flipper & Lopaka	1999–2005	Seven Network; ZDF (Germany, season 3)	co-production with EM.Entertainment, Animation Filmmakers Corporation and Victory Media Group (season 2)
Old Tom	2002	ABC1	co-production with EM.TV Wavery and Millimages
Bambaloo	2003–2004	Seven Network	co-production with The Jim Henson Company (season 1)
Deadly	2006	Nine Network	Last production under the Yoram Gross-EM.TV name co-production with SLR Productions
Dive, Olly, Dive!	2006-2010	Seven Network; Animania (United States); KIKA (Germany)	credited as Yoram Gross-EM.TV for the first 16 episodes; first production under the Flying Bark Productions name co-production with Mike Young Productions, Taffy Entertainment (season 1), Moonscoop (season 2), CDG International, Atlantyca Entertainment (season 2) and Telegael
Staines Down Drains	2006–2007	Seven Network	co-production with EM.Entertainment, Flux Animation Studio, Traction and NZ On Air
Zeke's Pad	2008–2010	Seven Network; YTV (Canada)	uncredited co-production with Leaping Lizard Productions, Bardel Entertainment and Avrill Stark Entertainment
Master Raindrop	2008–2009	Seven Network	co-production with EM.Entertainment, Big Communications, Flux Animation Studio and Media Development Authority
Legend of Enyo	2009–2010	Seven Network	co-production with Avrill Stark Entertainment and Screen NSW
Zigby	2009–2011	ABC Kids; Treehouse TV (Canada); ZDF (Germany)	co-production with Avrill Stark Entertainment, Thunderbird Films and Big Animation
The Woodlies	2012	Seven Network; ZDF (Germany)	co-production with Studio 100 Media
Vic the Viking	2013–2014	Network Ten/Eleven (Australia); ABC3 (Australia); TF1 (France)	co-production with Studio 100 Animation and ASE Studios
Tashi	2014–2015	7TWO	co-production with Telegael and Discreet Art Productions
Heidi	2015–2019	Nine Network; TF1 (France); Tiji/Piwi+ (France); ZDF (Germany)	season 1 only co-production with Studio 100 Animation and Heidi Productions (season 1); Based on the novel Heidi by Johanna Spyri
The Wild Adventures of Blinky Bill	2016–2017	7TWO/ABC Me	co-production with Studio 100, Studio 100 Media, Telegael and Giant Wheel Animation
Oh, Yuck!	2017	Seven Network	co-production with Silhouette Media Group
Rise of the Teenage Mutant Ninja Turtles	2018–2020	Nickelodeon	Animation services only produced by Nickelodeon Animation Studio
Glitch Techs	2020	Netflix	Animation services only produced by Nickelodeon Animation Studio
Lego Monkie Kid	2020–present	Peacock	co-production with The Lego Group continued by WildBrain Studios from season 4 onwards
100% Wolf: Legend of the Moonstone	2020–2023	ABC Me	co-production with Studio 100 Animation and Studio 56
FriendZSpace	2021–present	ABC Me	co-production with Studio 100 Animation, Studio 100 Media, Dan Clark Company, Shellnut Entertainment and T&B Media Global
What If...?	2021–2024	Disney+	Animation services only produced by Marvel Studios Animation
Moon Girl and Devil Dinosaur	2023–2025	Disney Channel	Animation services only produced by Disney Television Animation, Marvel Animation and Cinema Gypsy Productions
Stranger Things: Tales from '85	Coming 2026	Netflix	Animation services only produced by 21 Laps Entertainment, Upside Down Pictures and Netflix)
Untitled Ghostbusters series	Coming TBA	Netflix	Animation services only produced by Sony Pictures Animation and Ghost Corps

== Musicals ==
Year	Production	Country
1998	Sneeuwwitje	Belgium
1999	Assepoester	Belgium
2000	Pinokkio	Belgium, The Netherlands
2001	Robin Hood	Belgium
2001	Sneeuwwitje	The Netherlands
2002	Doornroosje	Belgium, The Netherlands
2003	Sneeuwwitje	France
2003	De 3 Biggetjes	Belgium
2004–2005	De Kleine Zeemeermin	Belgium, The Netherlands
2005	Sneeuwwitje (revival)	Belgium
2006–2008	Pinokkio (revival)	Belgium, The Netherlands
2008	Daens	Belgium
2011	Pinokkio	Turkey
2011	Alice in Wonderland	Belgium, The Netherlands
2012	Robin Hood (revival)	Belgium
2014	'14–'18	Belgium
2015	Kadanza	Belgium
2015–2016	Wickie de Musical	Belgium, The Netherlands, Germany
2016	Kadanza Together	Belgium
2017	Unidamu	Belgium
2018	Team U.P.	Belgium
2018–ongoing	'40–'45	Belgium
2019	TROEP!	Belgium
2020–ongoing	Knock-Out	Belgium
2020–ongoing	Vergeet Barbara	Belgium
