= Wissper =

- Genre: Children's television series Adventure; Fantasy; Educational
- Created by: Dan Good; Lucy Chesher; Kevin Snoad
- Written by: Sharon Miller; Simon Nicholson; Jimmy Hibbert; Gillian Corderoy; Mellie Buse; Nick Wilson (also head); Polly Churchill; Arabella Warner; Helena Smee
- Directed by: Sharon Miller (voice); Lucy Chesher (art); Kevin Snoad; Arabella Warner
- Voices of: Joanna Ruiz; Peyton Jowers; Keith Wickham; India Chesher-Good; Jimmy Hibbert; Alison Dowling; Flynn Chesher-Good; Rob Rackstraw; Nigel Pilkington
- Theme music composer: James Burrell
- Composers: Mr Miller & Mr Porter
- Countries of origin: Germany; United Kingdom; Ireland
- Original languages: German; English
- No. of seasons: 2

Production
- Executive producers: Jo Daris (co, m4e); Jessica Symons (Channel 5, Milkshake!)
- Running time: 7-10 minutes
- Production companies: Made 4 Entertainment; Absolutely Cuckoo; Telegael; Discreet Art Productions; Bastei Media; Wissper Limited

Original release
- Network: Channel 5 (UK); Junior (Germany)
- Release: 12 October 2015 – 30 November 2019

Wissper is a CGI preschool animated children's television series produced by Made 4 Entertainment (m4e), Telegael and Bastei Media. The first episode premiered in 2015. It is broadcast on the UK TV channel Channel 5 in their Milkshake! block.

== Characters ==
- Wissper is a 7-year-old girl, born with the magical ability to whisper to animals. She has a loving connection to all creatures. By using the magic word "Sssshhh!...", she can transport herself to anywhere if there is an animal in trouble. Wissper is sweet natured, except when animals are behaving badly.
- Peggy is a baby penguin, who is loveable, cute and mischievous. A great swimmer, erratic waddler and Wissper's best friend Peggy often accompanies Wissper on her amazing adventures.
- Kev is an energetic, confident crocodile with a surfer-dude attitude. Above all he's enthusiastic - he'd love to be a top surfer, but he never quite hits the crest of a wave.
- Dan is a panda who is laid back, slow, gentle and zen-like. Dan can be shy in a crowd and is quite content with his own company. When he talks, it appears not to make much sense, since everything he says seems to come from a fortune cookie. Dan loves to chew on bamboo.
- Stripes is a tiger who is a feisty, sophisticated lady; powerful and happy in her own fur. Stripes is a well spoken mother figure to Wissper when in the animal worlds. She is fierce when she wants to be, but also inclined to want her tummy rubbed.
- Herbert is a horse and an honest, strong and hardworking chap who is at his happiest when working up a sweat in the fields or pulling heavy logs up a grassy slope. He likes nothing better than to have Wissper riding on his back. He has the hairiest feet you have ever seen.
- Gertie and Otis: Gertie is a giraffe who is tall, gangly, nervous, jittery and easily frightened. Otis is an oxpecker bird who is Gertie's laid back, musical companion. Together best friends, Gertie and Otis are the perfect combination to help when height is needed.
- Monty is a meerkat who is very lively – chattering, playing and racing. He's quick, alert, suspicious, funny and unpredictable. Monty has a huge family and loves acrobatics.
- Ellington is an elephant who is clumsy, and loves waking up all. He also loves acrobatics.
- Ralph (aka Ralphie) is Wissper's brother. He wears yellow glasses and a blue beanie, and is shown to be fond of video games. He dislikes being called Ralphie and prefers to be called Ralph.
- Oscar is an orangutan.
- Sam is a seal.
- Samson is a lion.
- Ritchie is an ostrich.
- Curtis is a chameleon.
- Ed & Ted are beavers.
- Sonia is a slow loris.
- Mavis is a pig.

== Episodes ==
Season 1

1. Pingwing Penguin
2. Clumsy Elephant
3. Polar Brrr
4. Meerkat Muddle
5. Mice View
6. Tiger Teeth Trouble
7. Orangutangle
8. Step On It Seal
9. Jumping Joey
10. Monkey Mischief
11. Strong as a Horse
12. Panda Pal
13. Calm Down Croc!
14. Up With the Birds
15. Pig in a Puddle
16. Thirsty Giraffe
17. Bear Cub Bedtime
18. Roar, Lion, Roar!
19. Pitch Perfect Panda
20. Ostrich Away
21. Whale Song Sing-a-long
22. The Slow Slow Loris
23. Hipp-No!
24. Lostrich
25. Meerkat Patro
26. Oh No Polar Bear!
27. Eager Beavers
28. Camel Hump
29. Flamingo Flamenco
30. Paddling Pigs
31. Arctic Foxed
32. Handsome Horse
33. Penguin Playtime
34. Mini Mice Mystery
35. Sssh Penguin Sssh
36. Polar Bear Scare
37. Koala Tag
38. Sing Elephant Sing
39. Meerkat Mystery
40. Jump, Horse, Jump
41. Bear in the Middle
42. Orangutidy
43. Gourmet Hippo
44. A Penguin Party
45. Horse in a Hole
46. Pushy Penguins
47. Croc Up a Tree
48. Meerkat Itch!
49. Polar Bears On Ice
50. Pretty As A Pig
51. A Penguin Pal Problem
52. Orangutan's Bad Hair Day

Season 2

== Development ==
Production for Wissper was announced in April 2014, when London-based British animation studio Absolutley Cuckoo partnered with Irish animation & production outfit Telegael and German brand development & media alum m4e AG to develop a new CGI-animated series about a girl that could talk to the animals called Wissper as Channel 5 ordered the series for its Milkshake! block while m4e would handle licensing and distribution to the series with Waybuloo creator & Absolutey Cuckoo's managing director, Dan Good, serving as creator and showrunner of the upcoming series and Nick Wilson would write the episodes for the series.

Six months later in October of that year, m4e AG signed a partnership deal with Bastei Media, the media division Colonge-based German publishing company Bastei Lübbe AG, to colloaborate on the upcoming British/German television series Wissper as Bestei Media had joined the series as co-producer and would handle international publishing rights to the series for books and apps, meanwhile Indian animation studio Discreet Art Productions had also joined the upcoming series as a co-producer and would handle animations services for the upcoming series

In January 2017, Channel 5 renewed the series for a second series with India Chesher-Good reprising her role of the titular character and a very different voice cast for the second series. The following month in February of that year during the production of the second series of Wissper, Belgian production outfit Studio 100 under its German distribution division Studio 100 Media had brought a majority stake in the series producer m4e AG and the series itself with Studio 100 Media would take over distribution for the second series

=== Animation ===
Animation services for Wissper had been provided by Irish animation & production studio and co-producer Telegael, who handled post-production & some animation services and Indian animation studio & co-producer Discreet Art Productions, who provived animation production services for the series.
