= List of assets owned by Studio 100 =

List of assets owned by Belgian Studio 100 Group

These are assets owned by the Studio 100 Group (Studio 100 NV).

== Companies ==
A list of all companies that are a subsidiary of Studio 100 NV.

Asset			Type	Location
Studio Entertainment BVBA (share 100%) (1% via Studio 100 NV & 99% via Studio Entertainment 2 BVBA)				Schelle
Studio Entertainment 2 BVBA (share 100%) (99,99% via Studio 100 NV & 0,01% Via Njam! NV)				Schelle
Studio 100 TV NV - Studio 100 TV / Studio 100 Hits (share 100%) (99,99% via Studio 100 NV & 0,01% Via Njam! NV)			Television network	Schelle
Njam! NV (share 100%) (99,99% via Studio 100 NV & 0,01% via Studio 100 TV NV)			Television network	Schelle
Dedsit BV (share 68%)			Television production	Schelle
Studio 100 Animation SAS (share 100%)			Animation studio	Paris
Terribly Terrific! Productions (share 100%)			Animation studio	New York City
Studio 100 USA LLC (share 100%)				Wilmington
Go Connect BV (share 37,5%)				Grimbergen
Studio 100 International BV (share 100%)				Breda
Studio Plopsa NV (share 100%)	Plopsa NV (share 100%)	Plopsa Shop	Shop	Corporate; De Panne
Studio Plopsa NV (share 100%)	Plopsa NV (share 100%)	Plopsa Shop	Shop	Shop; Wijnegem
Studio Plopsa NV (share 100%)	Plopsa NV (share 100%)	Plopsa Indoor Hasselt	Theme park	Corporate; De Panne
Studio Plopsa NV (share 100%)	Plopsa NV (share 100%)	Plopsa Indoor Hasselt	Theme park	Park; Hasselt
Studio Plopsa NV (share 100%)	Plopsa NV (share 100%)	Plopsaland	Theme park	De Panne
Studio Plopsa NV (share 100%)	Plopsa NV (share 100%)	Plopsaqua de Panne	Water park	De Panne
Studio Plopsa NV (share 100%)	Plopsa NV (share 100%)	Proximus Theater	Theater	De Panne
Studio Plopsa NV (share 100%)	Plopsa Hotel NV (share 100%)		Hotel	De Panne
Studio Plopsa NV (share 100%)	Plopsa Village NV (formally known as Ter Hoeve NV) (share 100%)		Camping	De Panne
Studio Plopsa NV (share 100%)	Residentie De Biekorf NV (share 100%)		Mansion	De Panne
Studio Plopsa NV (share 100%)	Babalta BVBA (share 100%)			De Panne
Studio Plopsa NV (share 100%)	Plopsa Station Antwerp NV (share 100%)		Theme park	Corporate; De Panne
Studio Plopsa NV (share 100%)	Plopsa Station Antwerp NV (share 100%)		Theme park	Park; Antwerp
Studio Plopsa NV (share 100%)	Plopsa SRL - Plopsa Coo (share 100%)		Theme park	Stavelot
Studio Plopsa NV (share 100%)	Cookayak NV - Coo Adventure (share 100%)		Outdoor activity center	Stavelot
Studio Plopsa NV (share 100%)	Plopsa Hotel Coo NV (share 100%)		Hotel	Stavelot
Studio Plopsa NV (share 100%)	BfF Betrieb für Freizeitgestaltung GmbH & Co. KG (share 100%)	Holiday Park GmbH (share 100%)	Theme park	Haßloch
Studio Plopsa NV (share 100%)	BfF Betrieb für Freizeitgestaltung GmbH & Co. KG (share 100%)	B.f.F Betrieb fur Freizeitgestlatung Beteiligung GmbH (share 100%)		Haßloch
Studio Plopsa NV (share 100%)	BfF Betrieb für Freizeitgestaltung GmbH & Co. KG (share 100%)	Erich Schneider GmbH (share 100%)		Haßloch
Studio Plopsa NV (share 100%)	Plopsa BV - Plopsa Indoor Coevorden (share 100%)		Theme park	Dalen
Studio Plopsa NV (share 100%)	Plopsaqua Hannut-Landen BV (share 100%)		Water park	Corporate; Stavelot
Studio Plopsa NV (share 100%)	Plopsaqua Hannut-Landen BV (share 100%)		Water park	Park; Hannut
Kownaty Park 1 BV - Mayaland Kownaty (share 21%)			Theme park	Corporate; Amsterdam
Kownaty Park 1 BV - Mayaland Kownaty (share 21%)			Theme park	Park; Kownaty
Flying Bark Productions Pty. Ltd (share 100%)	Flying Bark Distribution Pty. Ltd. (share 100%)		Animation studio & holding companies	Camperdown
Flying Bark Productions Pty. Ltd (share 100%)	Flying Bark Interactive Pty. Ltd. (share 100%)		Animation studio & holding companies	Camperdown
Flying Bark Productions Pty. Ltd (share 100%)	Flying Bark Services Pty. Ltd. (share 100%)		Animation studio & holding companies	Camperdown
Flying Bark Productions Pty. Ltd (share 100%)	Greenpatch Productions Pty. Ltd. (share 100%)		Animation studio & holding companies	Camperdown
Flying Bark Productions Pty. Ltd (share 100%)	Yoram Gross Productions Pty. Ltd. (share 100%)		Animation studio & holding companies	Camperdown
Flying Bark Productions Pty. Ltd (share 100%)	The Woodlies Pty. Ltd. (share 100%)		Animation studio & holding companies	Camperdown
Flying Bark Productions Pty. Ltd (share 100%)	Blinky Bill TV Series 4 Prod. Pty. Ltd. (share 100%)		Animation studio & holding companies	Camperdown
Flying Bark Productions Pty. Ltd (share 100%)	100% Wolf Movie Pty. Ltd. (share 100%)		Animation studio & holding companies	Camperdown
Flying Bark Productions Pty. Ltd (share 100%)	100% Wolf TV Ptf. Ltd. (share 100%)		Animation studio & holding companies	Camperdown
Flying Bark Productions Pty. Ltd (share 100%)	Blinky Bill Movie Productions Pty. Ltd. (share 90%)		Animation studio & holding companies	Camperdown
Flying Bark Productions Pty. Ltd (share 100%)	Oh Yuck! Production Pty. Ltd. (share 90%)		Animation studio & holding companies	Camperdown
Flying Bark Productions Pty. Ltd (share 100%)	Buzz Studios Pty. Ltd. (share 35%)		Animation studio & holding companies	Camperdown
Flying Bark Productions Pty. Ltd (share 100%)	Tashi Production Pty. Ltd. (share 35%)		Animation studio & holding companies	Camperdown
Flying Bark Productions Pty. Ltd (share 100%)	Heidi Productions Pty. Ltd. (share 35%)		Animation studio & holding companies	Camperdown
Studio 100 International GmbH (share 100%)	Studio 100 Entertainment GmbH (share 100%)			Munich
Studio 100 International GmbH (share 100%)	Studio 100 Verwaltungs GmbH (share 100%)			Munich
Studio 100 International GmbH (share 100%)	Studio 100 Film GmbH (share 100%)		Sales agency	Munich
Studio 100 International GmbH (share 100%)	Studio Isar Animation GmbH (share 100%)		Animation studio	Munich
Studio 100 International GmbH (share 100%)	M4E GmbH (share 100%)	Déjà Vu Entertainment BV (share 50%)	Television production	Breda
Studio 100 International GmbH (share 100%)	M4E GmbH (share 100%)	Yep! TV Geschaftsfuhrung GmbH (share 48%)		Ismaning
Studio 100 International GmbH (share 100%)	M4E GmbH (share 100%)	Yep! TV Betriebs GmbH &Co. KG (share 46%)		Ismaning

=== Other assets ===
- Studio 100 Pop-Up Theater
- Dansstudio IJvi Hagelstein VZW

== Former assets ==
Asset	Fate
Schneiders Souvenir-Betriebe GmbH	Shutdown
Schneiders Gastor-Betriebe GmbH	Shutdown
I + FW Industrie - Und Freizeitwerbung GmbH	Shutdown
Wavery Productions BV	Shutdown
Hahn & M4E Productions GmbH	Merged with M4E GmbH
M4E Television GmbH	Merged with M4E GmbH
Telescreen BV	Merged with M4E GmbH
Junior. TV Verwaltungs GmbH	Merged with Studio 100 Media GmbH
EM.Entertainment GmbH	Merged with Studio 100 Media GmbH
Junior Produktions GmbH	Merged with Studio 100 Media GmbH
TEX-ASS Textilvertriebs GmbH	Sold
Impact Entertainment BV	Sold
RE Productions Pty. Ltd	Sold
Produktions GbR Tabaluga 2	Sold
Produktions GbR Tabaluga Co-Produktion	Sold
Wanagogo NV	Merged with Studio 100 NV
Little Airplane Productions Inc	Merged with Studio 100 USA
