= Heidi: Rescue of the Lynx =

- Directed by: Tobias Schwarz
- Written by: Rob Sprackling
- Story by: Tess Meyer; Marcus Sauermann
- Based on: Heidi by Johanna Spyri
- Produced by: Dario Sanchez Diaz; Thorsten Wegener
- Starring: Max Giermann; Michael McCown
- Music by: Ute Engelhardt
- Production companies: Studio 100 Film; Studio 100 International; Hotel Hungaria Animations; Heidi Production Film AIE; 3Doubles Producciones; Studio Isar Animation
- Distributed by: Leonine Distribution (Germany); Selecta Visión (Spain)
- Release dates: 4 June 2025 (Golden Sparrow - German Children's Film and Media Festival); 26 June 2025 (Germany); 1 August 2025 (United Kingdom); 22 August 2025 (Spain)
- Running time: 78 minutes
- Countries: Germany; Spain; Belgium
- Language: German
- Box office: $1.7 million

Heidi: Rescue of the Lynx is a 2025 animated adventure film directed by Tobias Schwarz. It is a German-Spanish-Belgian co-production, and the story follows Heidi who, after bonding with a lynx, must protect it from a businessman.

The film had its world premiere at the German Children's Media Festival on 4 June 2025, and was released in Germany on 26 June.

== Cast ==
=== English version ===
- Max Giermann
- Michael McCown

== Production ==
Heidi: Rescue of the Lynx is a co-production with Studio 100 International, 3 Doubles Producciones, and Hotel Hungaria Animation in association with Studio Isar Animation. The film was completed in early summer 2025.

== Release ==
Ahead of the film's market premiere at Cannes' Marché du Film on 15 May 2025, Studio 100 Film has secured distribution deals for Apollo Films for France, ACME Film for the Baltics, Kino Świat for Poland, NOS Lusomundo Audiovisuais for Portugal, Adler Entertainment for Italy, Kaleidoscope Home Entertainment for the United Kingdom, ADS Service for Hungary, Moldova, and Romania, Blitz for former Yugoslavia, Bohemia Motion Pictures for Czech Republic and Slovakia, Green Light Films for Ukraine, Beşiktaş Kültür Merkezi for Turkey, Zinos Panagiotidis for Greece, FilmHouse for Israel, and Myndform for Iceland. The film had its world premiere at the competition section of the German Children's Media Festival - Golden Sparrow in Erfurt on 4 June of the same year, and was theatrically released in Germany on 26 June, by Leonine Distribution. The film was released in Spain on 22 August.
