= Mia and Me =

- Genre: Fantasy; Adventure
- Created by: Gerhard Hahn
- Directed by: Gerhard Hahn; Bill Speers (season 1); Tony Power (season 1); Andrea De Sica (season 1); Luca Morsella (season 1); Gábor Steisinger (season 2, 4); Angel Izquierdo (seasons 2–4); Andy Kelly (season 2); Jean-Luc Massicci (seasons 1–2); Daniele Pintene (season 2); TJ House (season 3); Marc Meyer (season 3); Nina Wells (season 3); Matthiers Temmermans (season 4); Noel Cleary (season 4); Niomi Cleary (season 4)
- Starring: Rosabell Laurenti Sellers (seasons 1–2); Margot Nuccetelli (seasons 3–4); Adrian Moore (season 1); Saphia Stoney (season 1); Josephine Benini (seasons 1–2); Mary Sellers (seasons 1, 3); Fabrio Corallini (seasons 1–2)
- Voices of: Rosabell Laurenti Sellers (seasons 1–2); Margot Nuccetelli (seasons 3–4); Tajja Isen (season 1); Nicole Hise (seasons 3–4); Andrew Craig (season 1); Evan Stern (season 2); Timo Kinzel (season 3); Liam Mockridge (season 4); Rod Wilson (season 1); Roy O'Shea (season 2); Paul Tylak (seasons 3–4); Linda Ballantyne (season 1); Jodi Krangle (season 2); Marty Sandler (seasons 3–4); Jonathan Wilson (season 1); Todd Shick (season 2); Brian Burgges (seasons 3–4); Jamie Watson (season 1); Daniel Davies (season 2); Tomas Spencer (seasons 3–4); Elizabeth Hanna; Norma Dell'Agnese (season 1); Stephanie Barone (season 2); Manon Kahle (seasons 3–4)
- Composers: Gerd Kaeding (seasons 1–2); Simon Frontzek (seasons 3–4)
- Countries of origin: Germany; Italy (seasons 1–2); Canada (season 1)
- Original language: English
- No. of seasons: 4
- No. of episodes: 104

Production
- Executive producers: Gerhard Hahn (seasons 1–3); Hans Ulrich Stoef (seasons 1–3); Iginio Straffi (season 1); Mario Annaballi (seasons 1–3); Nicole Keeb (seasons 3–4); Martin Krieger (season 4); Barbara Stephan (season 4); Thorsen Wegener (season 4); Frank Voorbogt (season 4)
- Producers: Daniel Hawes (season 1); Iginio Straffi (season 1); Mario Annaballi (season 1); Gerhard Hahn (season 3); Hans Ulrich Stoef (season 3); Antonie Marcbach (season 4)
- Running time: 23 minutes
- Production companies: Made 4 Entertainment; Hahn & m4e Productions (formerly Lucky Punch) (seasons 1–3); Hahn Film AG; ZDF; March Entertainment (season 1); Rainbow S.p.A. (seasons 1–2); Rai Fiction (seasons 1–2)

Original release
- Network: Kika; Rai 2/Rai Gulp/Rai Yoyo/RaiPlay/Prime Video (Italy)
- Release: 6 August 2012 – 14 June 2023

Mia and Me is a live-action/animated hybrid children's television series created by Gerhard Hahn. In the United States, it aired on Nickelodeon's Nick Jr. Channel from May 3, 2014, to December 25, 2016. The show mixes live-action with CGI.

Mia and Me is entirely owned by the Belgian production & distribution company Studio 100 via its German subsidiary Made 4 Entertainment (m4e) which has owned it as of 2016 and was acquired by the company in 2017. Before the 2016 German buyout, the show was a German‑Italian‑Canadian co-production between Hahn Film AG, March Entertainment and Rainbow S.p.A.

A feature film adaptation of the hybrid series titled Mia and Me: The Hero of Centopia was produced by Studio 100's global international distribution division Studio 100 Media alongside its division Studio 100 Film and the former's feature film animation Studio Isar Animation with Studio 100's Australian animation production studio Flying Bark Productions, German distribution company Constantin Film and Studio B Animation co-producing the movie, Margot Nuccetelli who played the titular character from season 3 until season 4 reprised her role for the film adaptation. It was released in Germany on May 26, 2022.

== Premise ==
Mia's elf form (left) and her human form, holding her book.

After the death of her parents, a kind-hearted and beautiful 12-year-old girl named Mia Marconi Genovese is gifted a magical game that her father had made in life, taking the form of a large book called The Legend of Centopia. Inside is magical art and writing and a password, which when read a special way, allows Mia to travel to the magical world of Centopia. The land is filled with mythological creatures, including: winged elves and unicorns. While in Centopia, Mia changes into a beautiful winged elven girl with the unique ability to talk to unicorns. She also meets and befriends 2 elves: Yuko, an elven warrior, and Mo, an elven prince who wants to be a good, noble king when he grows up just like his father.

=== Season 1 ===
With the help of her oracles from a magic book, Mia, Yuko and Mo must find the pieces of the trumptus, a magic instrument made by an inventive pan named Phuddle. It has been captured, broken apart into twenty pieces, and scattered by an army of dark elves called the Munculus, led by the evil queen named Panthea. Panthea (concerned about her aging appearance to the point where she always wears a mask) needs the unicorns' horns for their rejuvenating powers. Every time a unicorn horn is destroyed, more of the island of Centopia dies. Eventually, a winged unicorn named Onchao is born, who can easily make the desert bloom again and restore the horns of other unicorns. After Mia and her friends succeed in defeating their adversaries with a fixed trumptus blast, only Gargona survives. They have reached the final pages of the book and Mia returns to her world, where it is nearing the end of the school year at the boarding school in Florence with her admirer, Vincent Frascati, her roommate, Paula Balani, and her bully, Violetta Rossi. Mia plans to revisit Centopia soon and see all her friends.

=== Season 2 ===
In the second season, Mia spends her summer holiday at her grandfather Renzo's farm in Lazio. There, she meets a worker named Mario, who is her second admirer and (towards the end of the season) learns about her ability to travel to Centopia. In Centopia, an evil circus director named Rixel, who we learn has been working for Lord Drakon, king of the dark elves, sets his sights on catching Onchao to please his master. Along the way, Mia meets a flute-playing elf named Simo, his mother, Tessandra and the 3 nature unicorns, Balanda, Zato and Yolika. Later in the season, Violetta discovers Mia's secret after finding a piece of her magical bracelet. She travels to Centopia and takes on the identity of an elf named Varia. As Varia, Violetta becomes one of Mia's allies and begins to show a kinder side, and eventually becomes Mia's friend.

=== Season 3 ===
In Centopia, a new winged unicorn, Kyara, who is Onchao's younger sister, is born. Meanwhile, Gargona is joined by a cockroach villain named Dax as they try to catch a golden unicorn horn to bring their master, Lord Drakon back. Along the way, Mia meets up with Yuko's sister Kuki, a swamp elf named Lola and her swamp unicorn friend, Mimola. In the real world during her summer vacation at the Poletti farm in Alto Adige with her new friend, Sara (who is blind), she finds Mia's bracelet and travels to Centopia. She is so relieved that she can see in this world and she even has the power to see the invisible spy bugs who follow Dax. At the end of the 3rd season, Dax and Gargona succeed in taking Onchao's horn. Mia and her friends arrive at the castle where Gargona and Dax are talking to Drakon about their prize. Yuko and Mo foil the villains' plot by breaking the horn into pieces. Kyara heals his horn. Dax leaves Centopia and Gargona stays on the island. Back in the real world, Sara makes the decision to go back to her old school instead of a new school in Milan.

=== The Hero of Centopia ===
Mia misses her summer vacation with her parents, but she's still reading about elves, unicorns, pans, and dragons. While a new threat in Centopia awaits when an evil toad named Toxor uses his dark magic to turn the guards into mindless slaves. Mia, Yuko, Mo, Phuddle, Onchao and their new, elven friend Iko travel far and wide, searching for the great storm unicorn named Stormy, who talks and speaks to animals and helps Mia and her friends defeat Toxor and save Centopia from toxic. Back in the real world, Renzo finds out that Mia's magical secret was traveling to Centopia, making friends with Yuko and Mo, talking to the unicorns, flying with the elves and saving the island from Gargona, Panthea, Rixel, Dax and Lord Drakon. It reminds Mia of how her mom and dad died by a car accident, but next summer, she's coming back to either the Marconi family's farm in Tuscany or the Hathaway family's farm in Alto Adige after boarding school in Florence and saying goodbye to Vincent and Paula.

=== Season 4 ===
Centopia is facing an existential threat: The original parts of the primeval continent are coming back together and Dystopia, home of Gargona and her trio of Dark Elves, Rixel, Dax, and Lord Drakon, has been set in motion as well. A race against time begins, as Mia, Yuko, and Mo start their quest of finding the rare ingredients for the Potion of Unity that will nullify Dystopia's evil power. Along the way, they get help from a noble, handsome guardian elf named Riok. In the season finale, Mia, Yuko and Mo battle against the dark elves and save Centopia.

== Cast ==
=== Live-action characters ===
- Rosabell Laurenti Sellers as Mia (seasons 1–2)
- Margot Nuccetelli as Mia (seasons 3–4)
- Adrian Moore as Vincent (season 1)
- Saphia Stoney as Paula (season 1)
- Josephine Benini as Violetta Di Nola (seasons 1–2)
- Ray Lovelock as Renzo (season 2)
- Luca Murphy as Mario (season 2)
- Antony Souter as Silvio (season 2)
- Gianna Paola Scaffidi as Franca (season 2)
- Sara Ricci as Contessa Di Nola (season 2)
- Fabio Corallini as Vittorio (season 2)
- Douglas Dean as The Bank Manager (season 2)
- Lucia Luna Laurenti Sellers as Sara (season 3)
- Laura Ruocco as Luciana (season 3)
- Giuseppe Gandini as Mr Monti (season 3)
- Clive Riche as Mr Meloni (season 3)
- Tommaso Neri as Fabio (season 3)
- Alex James Ellison as Mattis (season 4)
- Claire Schuyfell as Carina (season 4)
- Phillip Battley as Pieter (season 4)
- Harry Piekema as Hektor (season 4)
- Lucas Tavernier as Lucas (season 4)

=== Animated characters ===
- Rosabell Laurenti Sellers as Mia (seasons 1–2)
- Margot Nuccetelli as Mia (seasons 3–4)
- Tajja Isen as Yuko
- Andrew Craig as Mo
- Rod Wilson as Raynor
- Linda Ballantyne as Mayla
- Jonathan Wilson as Phuddle
- Jamie Watson as Polytheus
- Norma Dell'Agnese as Gargona
- Elizabeth Hanna as Panthea (season 1)
- David Pender Crichton as Rixel (seasons 2 & 4)
- Jeff Burrell as Dax (seasons 3–4)
- Pierre Mourant as Simo (seasons 2–4)
- Kelly Topaz as Tessandra (seasons 2–4)
- Pina Crispo as Xolana (seasons 2–4)
- Valerie Borghesi as Shiva (seasons 2–4)
- Rochelle Bulmer as Lasita (seasons 2–4)
- Martin Yap as Lord Drakon (seasons 2–4)
- Ricardia Bramley as Kuki (seasons 3–4)
- Kristi Hughes as Lola (seasons 3–4)
- Robin Marienfeld as Riok (season 4)

== Episodes ==
=== Season 1 (2012) ===
#	Title	Summary
1	Talking to Unicorns	Mia makes friends with Centopia's royalty and discovers that she is able to talk to unicorns.
2	Centopia's Hope	Mia makes a discovery about Phuddle's dissonant, Trumptus; the elves have a new reason to be hopeful.
3	Restoration	Mia tries to help Phuddle put the Trumptus back together.
4	Trumptus Lost	Mia is lost in the Valley of Vapors; the Trumptus is left behind for Panthea to fulfill the prophecy.
5	The Golden Son	Mia heads to Centopia and finds Lyria in need; a golden-horned unicorn is born.
6	Onchao's Oasis	After Lyria is taken captive by Gargona and her Munculus army, Mia vows to protect Onchao.
7	Hope in Pieces	With Lyria gone, Mia is desperate to cheer up Onchao.
8	Ziggo's Day Off	Mia and the elves find a piece of the Trumptus in a hanging flower garden; Gargona steals the piece of the Trumptus.
9	The Elves and the Dragon	Onchao makes friends with a newly hatched dragon; Mia and the elves attempt a daring rescue.
10	The Blossom Tree	The elves enlist the help of the powerful Earth Unicorn to protect the unicorns when they visit the Blossom Tree for their annual feast.
11	All That Glitters	Mia deals with several dilemmas while in Centopia.
12	Phuddle's Foibles	Phuddle tags along on an excursion to the Lofty Caves.
13	The Fire Unicorn	Mia is forced to intrude on Onchao's ceremony when Yuko and Mo are captured by Muncs.
14	The Wizened Woods	Mia and the elves search for a piece of the Trumptus in the forest.
15	Miss Know-It-All	A Tell-All creature leads Mia and the elves into a treacherous trap.
16	The Unicorn Trap	Panthea plans to capture Onchao.
17	All Dressed Up	Mia and Yuko compete for the crown at the Blushflower Princess Ball.
18	King for a Day	Mo is left in charge of Centopia while the king and queen have the flu; Mo must find a way to help Mia and Yuko.
19	The Panned Piper	Mia must find a solution when Phuddle creates a new instrument that mesmerizes its listeners.
20	Cave of Truth	After suffering a blow to the head, Mia suddenly gets amnesia. To restore her memory, her friends must take her to the Cave of Truth, where people can only speak the truth... but they may not like some of what they hear.
21	Against the Wind	Mia is caught in a strong wind and blown far away from her friends; Mia must find a way to survive while lost in the remote badlands with a broken wing.
22	Under the Moon	Yuko wants to spend time with Mo and is frustrated by Mia's constant interruptions; Yuko and Mo are trapped by a landslide.
23	Choosing Sides	Mia and the elves are sent on an expedition to the watery domain of Polytheus.
24	Tears of Joy	A severe drought afflicts Centopia citizens; Mia and her friends redouble their efforts to rebuild the Trumptus.
25	Panthea's Proposal	Panthea leads her army to the dried-up Waterdome; Mia seizes an opportunity to search Panthea's vacant palace for the last Trumptus piece.
26	End of an Age	Mia, Vincent and Paula see ominous images in the book; Yuko and Mo are captured by the Munculus; Mia must find a way to save Centopia.

=== Season 2 (2015) ===
#	Title	Synopsis
27	The Mysterious Visitor	While visiting her grandfather's farm, Mia returns to Centopia as the mysterious Rixel arrives with his circus boat.
28	Behind the Curtain	Mia and Yuko go to the back of Rixel's circus to find out what's going on. Back on the farm, Mia is surprised to see a familiar face.
29	The Animal Guardians	Mia and her grandfather get into trouble over a bad neighbor, while in Centopia, Rixel devises a plan to catch his animals again.
30	Dragons in Danger	With her grandfather's farm in jeopardy, Mia picks up something to make money. In Centopia, Mia and her friends are fighting to save the dragons from Rixel.
31	The Ghost of Blackwood Forest	Mia and her friends rush to a haunted forest to pick peppers and help Centopia. Violetta wants to take Mario away from the farm.
32	The Spell of the Green Fluids	Mario's grandmother's visit brings ups and downs to the farm. Rixel is preparing to use a new weapon to crush the elves and catch Onchao. NOTE: Mia mentions Paula before she heads to Centopia.
33	Beyond the Wall of Vines	Mario helps a pig birth. Mia, Yuko and Phuddle meet the ghost in the haunted forrest and learn more about the green fluids.
34	A Father's Feather	Mia and her grandfather save a horse from the slaughterhouse. Onchao runs away to learn more about his father.
35	Speaking with Stones	Mia tries to ride Sapphire against her grandfather's wishes. Mia, Yuko, Mo, and Onchao race against Rixel and Gargona to retrieve a piece of Ono's crown from the stone unicorn.
36	Dancing with Stars	Sapphire only allows Mia to ride him. Mia, Yuko, Mo, Simo, and Onchao dance with the stars and meet the star unicorn to get another piece of Ono's crown.
37	The Unwanted Roommate	Mia and Mario try to enter Sapphire into a competition to save the farm. Scrobbit runs away with a crown piece.
38	That's What Friends are For	Mia is allowed to enter the competition with Sapphire. Mia, Yuko, Mo, and Onchao enter the Crystal caves with Polytheus to find the third crown piece inside the crystal unicorn.
39	Return to Panthea's Castle	Mia starts training with Sapphire for the competition. Mia, Yuko, Mo, and Onchao return to Panthea's castle in search of the final crown piece.
40	The Whistling Bolobo	Mia and Mario learn more about Violetta's father. Rixel tries to attack the phauns but Mia, Yoko, Mo, Onchao and Simo stop him.
41	My Name is Varia	Violetta enters Centopia without Mia's knowledge. Ono's Crown is stolen by Taqito.
42	Crossing the Rainbow Bridge	Tarzan jumps into Mario's grandmother's scooter and is accidentally taken to the property. Mia, Yuko, Onchao and Mo try to find the rainbow island.
43	Taking Sides	
44	A Shower of Pollen	
45	The Fiery Flower	
46	Journey to the North	
47	The Unicorn King	Mia and her friends are trying to find Ono and save him from dying.
48	The Rainbow Spring	
49	Hide and Seek	After an argument with her mother about her father, Violetta runs away from Centopia after she got grounded by her mother.
50	A Sticky Situation	Violetta is missing and Mia discovers the true identity of Varia, causing her to be punished by Mo.
51	The Strongest Team	Mia is trying to bring Violetta back to find her father, while Violetta proves support for elves.
52	Breaking the Spell	After an unforgettable episode where we see Rixel turning Ono into an evil unicorn with his potion, Mia and her friends have one more mission to complete: to stop Rixel and save Ono once and for all.

=== Season 3 (2017) ===
#	Title	Synopsis
53	Kyara's Birth	Mia returns to Centopia. Lyria gives birth to a new daughter named Kyara.
54	The Dark Elf's Arrival	Dax and his hopper's arrive in Centopia at Panther's old palace now maintained by Gargona. Dax brings the nightvine from Dystopia.
55	King and Queen Asleep	Mo and Yuko take a piece of the nightvine. The nightvine is released from the container poising the King and Queen into a deep sleep.
56	Pan King's Secret	The elves must find out how to stop the night vine.
57	Sister Wracked	
58	Unicorn Kindergarten	
59	Phuddle Moves Out	
60	The Highest Bidder	
61	Night Becomes Day	
62	Circle of Life	Kiara and Mia travel to her Grandmother before she passes away from her old age. Yuko, Mo and Onchao lead the Hoppers and Dax away from Mia and Kiara.
63	Glowing Arrows	
64	Finding Simo	
65	Freeze and Snoot	
66	Monster Alarm	
67	Moonstruck	While on the hunt for another piece of the Heart Piece that will stop the nightvine, Dax is sleepwalking.
68	Unicorn of Hearts	Mia has to buy a fig from dark elves that can grow a tree for the Unicorn of hearts to live in it.
69	The Giant Butterfly	
70	Bluebardo in Trouble	
71	The Shyest Unicorn	
72	Return to Rainbow Island	
73	Ziggo Moves Out	Ziggo leaves Panthea's palace with a piece of the heart crystal and moves into the elven palace. Dax and Gargona try to hunt down Ziggo to gain the piece of the Heart Piece which they discover Ziggo has.
74	Return to Crystal Cave	
75	Heist on Dark Castle	Mia has to travel to Dystopia to find a heart crystal that Dax has stolen.
76	Seeing in the Dark	Sara travels to Centopia to find Mia and save her from evil hands of Dax.
77	Big Sleep	
78	The Last Stand	Now that Mia and her friends have finally succeeded to repair the heart of Centopia, it is time to face off against Lord Drakon once again.

=== Season 4 (2022–2023) ===
#	Title	Synopsis
1	Strange Tides	Mia and her friends need the pan king's help to find out why strange tides are happening.
2	Zealanding	
3	The Coming Storm	
4	Go With The Flo	
5	The Rainbow Bridge	Mia and others are returning to Rainbow Island, where they find out a way to stop the fog of doom.
6	Battle Of The Dragons	Mia,Yuko and Mo heads towards the Dragon Caves to gain the next ingredient. Dax and Gargona goes to intercept them with Dark Dragons and Muncs to sabotage their plans.
7	Shimmering Moon	
8	The Land Of Swamp And Honey	
9	In Rhythm	
10	Duel Of The Pans	
11	Dancing Lights	
12	Hidden Treasures	
13	What The Mirrors Will Tell You	Mia and others have to return to the crystal cave to find another ingredient.
14	The Lilac Grotto	
15	The Backup	
16	The Sneaky Snakeman	
17	The Hanging Gardens	
18	A Freezing Venture	
19	Under Attack	Lord Drakon sends Dax and Rixel to lead an invasion into Centopia.
20	A Fiery Adventure	
21	The Unicorn That Speaks	
22	Into The Jungle	
23	Starry Prickly Night	
24	The Last Ingredient	Mia,Yuko,Mo and Roki go off to find the Last Ingredient. Gargona uses her speaking stone to discovers the location of the last ingredient. Lord Drakon sends Dax and Rixel to go after the elves and capture the last ingredient.
25	The Potion Of Unity	Mia,Yuko and Mo head to Bolobo Mountain to create the Potion. Lord Drakon sends Dax and Rixel to attack the Algi Farm and the Elf Palace while Gargona leds the Dark Dragons to capture the potion.
26	Centopia At Stake	The elves use Rixel's amulet to go to Dystopia to turn off the fog and defeat Lord Drakon once in for all.

== Production ==
Production of the series began in 2009 when German production outfit Lucky Punch (a joint venture between German media management & distribution company Made 4 Entertainment (m4e) and Berlin animation studio Hahn Film) alongside Italian production company Rainbow S.p.A and Canadian animation studio March Entertainment announced the creation of a new live action/animated hybrid children's series which was originally named Yoko, Mo and Me. Filming for live-action scenes was planned to take place in Germany and animation segments would be traditionally animated with CGI elements.Dutch distribution firm Telescreen alongside Rainbow would jointly handle distribution for the series worldwide. One year later in October 2010 the show was renamed to its current name when German public broadcaster ZDF and Italy's Rai Fiction had joined the live-action/animated hybrid children's series as co-producers and commissioners for the series as the show decided to switch to CGI animation production with the main characters being renamed to its current names Mia and Yuko.

In July 2013, the show had been renewed for a second season with Canadian animation production studio March Entertainment dropped out of the show as Rainbow CGI fully animating the series in-house alongside the show's Canadian voice cast being replaced.

In late-March 2015 before the programme's second season began airing in Germany and other countries, the show had been renewed for a third season with production on the third season started and will be delivered by the end of 2016 with planning to launch a film adaptation. A year later on June 6, 2016, Italian entertainment company Rainbow sold its 45% share in the series to co-producer Made 4 Entertainment (m4e) with Berlin-based German animation studio Hahn Film acquired a 5% stake in the series effectivity turning the show into a full German production with a wholly different cast and filming for live-action scenes will be fully shot in Germany with some scenes continued filming in Italy, Rainbow however continued to distribute the series in Italy.

In January 2018 when Mia and Me was renewed for a fourth season, Made 4 Entertainment (m4e) alongside their new parent & Belgian production group Studio 100 who brought a majority stake in Mia & Me producer back in February 2017 had announced they took full control of the hybrid series Mia and Me by acquiring the remaining stake of the property from its partner Hahn Film AG giving m4e complete ownership of the show with filming for live-action shots being moved to Belgium where m4e's parent Studio 100 is being held. Animation for the fourth season was being handled by Studio 100's Australian animation studio Flying Bark Productions who will provide visual effects for the series' fourth season with Indian animation studio Studio 56 Animation handling the main animation for the show.

=== Casting ===
In 2010 when the series was commissioned by German television network ZDF and Italian broadcasting network Rai, American-Italian actress Rosabell Laurenti Sellers was cast as the role for the titular character Mia.

Josephine Benini was cast for her role as Mia's rival Violetta for the show's first season in live-action sequences, she would later reprise her role for the show second's season. However, Canadian actress Alanna LeVierge voiced Violetta's elf form Varia for the animated segments.

=== Animation ===
Animation for the first season was provided by Toronto-based Canadian animation studio March Entertainment who co-produced the series' first season handled CGI animation for Centopia and 2D animation inserts for the live-action scenes.

When Canadian animation studio March Entertainment shut down in 2013, the shows' CGI animation production for Centopia and the 2D animated inserts would later be taken over in-house by co-producer & Italian animation studio Rainbow (who it's Rome-based live-action division Rainbow Entertainment previously handled live action scenes) and it's CGI animation production division Rainbow CGI taking the series' animation production.

After Italian animation studio Rainbow sold its stake in the series to German media management company M4E, Bangalore-based Indian animation studio Xentrix Studios would provide CGI animation production from Rainbow's CGI animation division Rainbow CGI for Centopia whilst 2D animated inserts would now be made in-house by German animation studio Hahn Film (who handle the show's development) alongside Danish animation studio A. Film Production

When Belgian children's production company Studio 100 through its German entertainment unit M4E acquired the remaining 50% stake in the series from its partner Hahn Film back in January 2018, the animation production for Centopia segments and the 2D animation inserts for the final season had moved to Studio 100's Australian animation studio Flying Bark Productions and Indian animation studio Studio 56 Animation (whom the two companies previously partnered on the movie The Hero of Centopia).

== International Distribution ==
Country	Channels	First TV premiere
Italy	Rai 2, Rai Gulp, Rai Yoyo, RaiPlay, Prime Video	10 september 2012
Albania	Cufo TV	2012
Benelux	Nickelodeon	2012
Belgium	Nickelodeon, RTBF (Ouftivi su La Trois)	2012
Bosnia and Herzegovina	ULTRA	2012
Brazil	TV Cultura, Gloob, Netflix	14 april 2012, january 2019
Bulgaria	Minimax	2012
Canada	Disney Junior Family Channel, Yoopa	4 september 2011
South Korea	KBS Kids	24 september 2012
Croatia	ULTRA, Minimax, Nova TV	2012
Denmark	DR	2012
United Arab Emirates	E-Vision	2012
Finland	MTV3, ETV2	september 2012
France	Télétoon+ (stagione 1), Boing, Gulli, TiJi	19 december 2011
Germany	KiKA, ZDF, Nickelodeon	6 august 2012
Greece	Mega Channel	15 september 2013
Japan	TV Tokyo	14 october 2013
Hong Kong	Disney Junior TVB Jade	2012
India	Disney Junior IndianTwo	2013
Indonesia	Disney Junior MT Entertainment, RCTI	2012
(Republic of Ireland) Ireland	Nickelodeon	2014
Kosovo	Minimax	2012
(North Macedonia) Macedonia	ULTRA, Minimax	2012
Malaysia	Disney Junior RTM, TV1, TV2	2012
Mexico	Televisa	2012
Montenegro	ULTRA, Minimax	2012
Norway	TV2	2012
Netherlands	Nickelodeon, Ziggo	4 april 2012
Poland	Teletoon+, TV Puls, TVP ABC	23 march 2012
Portugal	Canal Panda, TVI, PandaKidsTv	17 december 2012
United Kingdom	Nickelodeon, Prime Video	2014
Czech Republic	Minimax	2012
Romania	Minimax	2012
Russia	СТС	2014
United States	Nick Jr., Prime Video	5 may 2014
Serbia	ULTRA, Minimax	2 january 2012
Singapore	Disney Junior Okto	2012
Slovakia	Minimax	2012
Slovenia	POP TV	2012
Spain	Clan	2012
Sweden	Nickelodeon	2012
Switzerland	RTS Deux	2012
Thailand	Disney Junior Tiga	2012
Turkey	Smart Çocuk, Planet Çocuk	2012
Hungary	Minimax	5 june 2012

Since the first two seasons were distributed by Rainbow, a studio formerly co-owned by Viacom, Mia and Me is broadcast on Viacom's Nickelodeon channels in many territories. The Nick Jr. Channel in the United States premiered the series beginning on May 3, 2014, and ending on December 25, 2016. Up until mid-2021, the show was available to stream on NickJr.com. In the United Kingdom, the series aired on Nick Jr. in January 2014. Nickelodeon began airing the series in the Philippines on July 1, 2013. The series aired in Singapore on MediaCorp Okto, in the United Arab Emirates on e-Junior, in Indonesia on RCTI and in Australia on 10 Peach (formerly Eleven). The series is available through Netflix in many countries, since September 2014. In 2017, the series aired on eToonz in South Africa. In Brazil, the first season of the series premiered on Gloob, on April 14, 2014, and the second season premiered on January 23, 2017. Since October 12, 2020, the series has been aired on TV Cultura.

== Feature film ==
In November 2017, Belgian children's production group Studio 100 (who acquired Mia and Me's parent co-production company m4e back in February that same year) announced through its German film sales division Studio 100 film was developing a movie adaptation of the series named Mia and Me - The Movie was being in development. The film was being produced by Studio 100's German subsidiaries m4e and Hahn & m4e Productions with Studio 100's Australian animation studio Flying Bark Productions (who previously handled visual effects for the show's fourth season) and German feature-film animation studio Studio Isar Animation will provide animation and co-producing the movie with a planned 2020 release date. The film's name is Mia and Me - The legend of Centopia.
