= Studio 100 =

Belgian production and distribution company

Studio 100 N.V.
- Logo used since 2025
- Type: Private
- Industry: Entertainment
- Founded: 29 March 1996; 30 years ago
- Founders: Gert Verhulst; Danny Verbiest; Hans Bourlon
- Headquarters: Schelle, Flanders, Belgium
- Area served: Worldwide
- Key people: Gert Verhulst (CEO); Hans Bourlon (CEO); Anja van Mensel (CEO of Studio 100 Benelux)
- Owner: Gert Verhulst (25%); Hans Bourlon (25%); BNP Paribas Fortis Private Equity (25%); Vic Swerts (17%); 3D Investors (8%)
- Divisions: Studio 100 Animation; Studio 100 Benelux; Studio 100 International; Studio 100 TV
- Subsidiaries: Flying Bark Productions; Plopsa; Terribly Terrific! Productions
- Website: www.studio100.com

Studio 100 N.V. is a Belgian production and distribution company that specializes in kids and family entertainment content and operates animation studios such as Australian animation company Flying Bark Productions and theme parks worldwide including their own international distribution division Studio 100 International alongside their main television channels such as Studio 100 TV. The headquarters of the company is in Schelle, along with offices in Breda, Munich, Paris, New York City, Sydney and Los Angeles.

== History ==
Studio 100 was founded on 29 March 1996 by Gert Verhulst, Danny Verbiest and Hans Bourlon. The three came together for seven years when they created the show Samson & Gert, in which Verhulst and Verbiest also starred. Samson & Gert started as a duo which announced television shows. Besides the production of their original show they started creating a new series called Kabouter Plop. Following the success of these two shows, the company expanded into new fields in 1999. Studio 100 produced their first movie that year, which was called The Gnome Treasure (De Kabouterschat in Dutch). Additionally, the company began to create the musical Assepoester, a Dutch spoken version of Cinderella. Studio 100 purchased a theme park and converted it to revolve around their IPs. For the latter three, they required co-funding from the Vlaamse Media Maatschappij. In 2002, they began to expand their offering when they acquired the girl group K3 from BMG.

In 2005, Danny Verbiest announced his retirement from Samson & Gert, but also as a shareholder of the company. The shares were bought by Verhulst and Bourlon, but a year later in October 2006, BNP Paribas Fortis Private Equity had brought a 33% stake in Studio 100 alongside its 50% stake in subsidiary Ded's IT Productions with its founders Verhulst and Bourlon divested its shares of their company to BNP Fortis Provatw Equity. With the new ownership the company ventured into the international, non-Dutch speaking, market by copying their original shows in other languages and creating new shows like Bumba.

On 31 August 2006, Studio 100 expanded into the adult-focus production genre as it had brought a 50% stake in Belgian film and television production outfit DED's It Productions from its founders Dirk Verhoeye, Erik Gordts and David Ottenburgh. The acquisition of the entertainment production company DED'S It Productions became Studio 100's entry into the adult-focused programming genre as it became a joint-venture production subsidiary between Studio 100 and its co-founders while it started producing series from Studio 100's girl pop and children's music franchise K3; Studio 100 would later bring full control of its Belgian joint-venture production subsidiary DED's It Productions 12 years later on October 23, 2018, by acquiring the remaining 50% shares, effectively became a fully-owned production subsidiary of Studio 100 while the studio DED's It Productions was later renamed simply Dedsit a year later in 2019.

In 2007, Studio 100 teamed up with VTech to create electronic toys, The Bumba toys are for 6–36 months, but the others are 3–6 years

Their international expansion took flight in 2008 when they founded a Belgian digital television channel called Studio 100 TV, and Studio 100 Media, a German division to sell their content to the international market. Over the next years, the company revamped the old classics they acquired and established a new cooking channel, called Njam!, in Belgium in 2010 and BeJunior in the Middle East and North Africa in 2016.

In July 2007, Studio 100 launched their own in-house global international distribution division based in Munich named Studio 100 Media to distribute Studio 100's productions worldwide with Studio 100 hiring general manager Patrick Elmendorff to head Studio 100's in-house global distribution division as their president.

On 26 February 2008 three months before Studio 100's acquisition of EM.Sport Media AG's German entertainment production division EM.Entertainment, Studio 100's Munich-based German international distribution division Studio 100 Media established a distribution partnership with Munich-based German entertainment production and distribution company EM.Sport Media AG under the latter's entertainment production division EM.Entertainment to distribute their entertainment portfolio including their classics such as Maya the Bee and Vic the Viking on TV, home entertainment and VOD platforms internationally excluding US, Germany, Australia, New Zealand.

In April 2008, Studio 100 announced it had teamed up with Toronto-based Canadian animation production studio & entertainment company Amberwood Entertainment to develop a new 2D-animated children's television series entitled Super Mega Hyper Pets, the series follows the adventures of eight-year-old Timmy Jones and his pets Spike, Fuzzy and Julius, each member possess a powerful ability, a special suit & a tricked-out vehicle that combines with the others to form the world’s most dynamic tool in protecting every-day life, the series was originally meant to be traditionally-animated with Amberwood Entertainment providing animation services as well as co-producing it with Studio 100, Studio 100's French animation arm Studio 100 Animation would later take over production from its parent Studio 100 the series would later be upgraded into a CGI-animated series with the earth pets changed into three talking alien pets with superpowers—Super Zee the Dog, Hyper Harrier the Rabbit and a feline named Megakat Thunderpaw, while Flying Bark Productions joined the series as co-producer with Australian television browdcasting network ABC and French preschool TV channel Tiji ordering the series, for it to be broadcast in Australia and France, but the series was never produced.

In late-May 2008 following Studio 100's successful distribution partnership with EM.Sport Media AG's EM.Entertainment division under Studio 100's German international distribution division Studio 100 Media three months prior, Studio 100 announced that they have acquired EM.Sport Media AG's entertainment division EM.Entertainment and its library along with the latter's Australian entertainment and animation production studio Flying Bark Productions and their German television channel JuniorTV (which Studio 100 would eventually close in 2022) for €41 million in order for EM.Sport Media AG to focus on its sport activities, the acquisition of EM.Entertainment expanded Studio 100's kids and family programme library and gave Studio 100 their own Australia-based in-house entertainment & animation production studio and a German-language television channel as their first entry into the broadcasting industry outside of Belgium with Studio 100's global distribution division Studio 100 Media taken over EM.Entertainment's distribution library including Yoram Gross's animated productions such as Blinky Bill alongside EM.Entertainment's classic catalogue such as Maya the Bee and Vic the Viking and the library of Japanese animation studio Zuiyo bringing the two classic characters together under Studio 100 with the new owner launching new adaptations of the two classic shows.

Two months later in late-August 2008, Studio 100 announced their entry into the channel business by launching their own in-house music television channel in collaboration with Belgian cable TV provider Telenet named Studio 100 TV marking Studio 100's second owned television channel outside of Germany and their first one to be launched in Belgium with the new channel launched a month later in September of that same year, the new channel will run from 6:00am to 10:00pm every day with interactive segments alongside its music programmes and songs from the Studio 100 library and television specials relating to Christmas and going back to school.

One year later, on 12 February 2009 following Studio 100's acquisition of EM.Sport Media AG's entertainment production division EM. Entertainment and its Australian animation production studio Flying Bark Productions, Studio 100 announced that they have launched their in-house animation studio based in Paris, France named Studio 100 Animation to produce new and revamped adaptations of their existing catalogue including the classics that Studio 100 had acquired one year before such as the classics of both Maya the Bee and Vic the Viking alongside producing their original programmes with Jo Harris heading Studio 100's new in-house animation division as MD with Studio 100 Animation had assumed production of Super Mega Hyper Pets, and Rescue 4U from its parent Studio 100. Five months later in late-July of that same year, Studio 100 announced that their global distribution division Studio 100 Media had acquired the entire rights to the Maya the Bee from the German public foundation Waldemar Bonsels Foundation.

In November 2010, Studio 100 further strengthened its theme park operations with the acquisition of Haßloch-based German theme park Holiday Park (which was closed back in October of that year) with Studio 100 placing the acquired German theme park under its subsidiary Plopsa with Holiday Park's MD Wolfgang Schneider would departure the German theme park Holiday Park while Studio 100 would reopen the park the following year in 2011.

In July 2012, Studio 100 announced that their head of global business development Jo Daris had exited the Belgian family entertainment company in order for him to launch a new career in real estate development in Asia with Studio 100's co-founder and CEO Hans Bourlon taking over as their new head of global business development.

In May 2013, Studio 100 through its German international distribution division Studio 100 Media announced the expansion of its parent company's activities into the movie business worldwide with the launch of their new film division dedicated to produce and distribute Studio 100's films in-house along with third-party movies named Studio 100 Film with its first production based on its famous characters Maya the Bee: The Movie following the success of Studio 100's animation division's adaptation of the TV series of the same name with the new division securing international distribution for their first movie.

On 4 February 2014, Studio 100 announced the launching of their new digital entertainment division dedicated to Studio 100's reach to release its programmes on digital platforms and named former BBC Worldwide head of digital entertainment executive Tom Reding to head Studio 100's new digital division as their head of digital entertainment.

In late-January 2017 nine years after the acquisition of EM.Sport Media AG's German mids and family production and distribution EM.Entertainment including its German TV channel Junior and Australian animation studio Flying Bark Productions by Studio 100's German global distribution division Studio 100 Media, Studio 100 announced that its global distribution division Studio 100 Media had established a deal to acquire a 68% majority stake in German brand management and media production and distribution company Made 4 Entertainment (M4E AG) the producer of Mia and Me and the owner of the libraries of the former German distributor TV-Loonland AG and Danish animation outfit Egmont Imagination alongside its Dutch distribution subsidiary Telescreen in a deal that could combine Studio 100's expanded catalogue with Made 4 Entertainment (m4e)'s wider library which would make the former as the biggest kids and family entertainment content companies across Europe with Made 4 Entertainment (M4E) would continue to invest their new content and its global expansion. A month later in late-February of that same year, Studio 100's global distribution division Studio 100 Media announced that they have completed their acquisition of a 68% majority stake in German brand management and media production and distribution company Made 4 Entertainment (m4e AG) the producer of Mia and Me and the owner of the libraries of the former German distributor TV-Loonland AG and Danish animation outfit Egmont Imagination alongside its Dutch distribution subsidiary Telescreen, making it a subsidiary of Studio 100 Media with Made 4 Entertainment (M4E)'s CEO and founder Hans Ulrich Stoef continued to lead the acquired company through Studio 100 Media. Studio 100 Media would eventually increase their stake of Made 4 Entertainment (m4e) and later took full control after selling and spinning off some of m4e's subsidiaries three years later in 2020.

At the start of December 2017, Studio 100 expanded their international operations into the United States with their acquisition of New York-based American preschool animation production studio Little Airplane Productions, thrust giving Studio 100 another animation studio this time in the U.S. as their American animation production subsidiary with the latter developing and producing their new projects with Studio 100's own in-house animation production studios such as Studio 100 Animation alongside its Munich-based global distribution division Studio 100 Media distributing them whilst Little Airplane Production founder Josh Selig continued leading the New York-based American animation studios within Studio 100.

In January 2018, Studio 100's global distribution division Studio 100 Media under its German brand subsidiary M4E AG announced that they had taken full control of the live action/animated hybrid series Mia and Me by acquiring the remaining 50% stake in the series from its co-production partner Hahn Film with m4e AG and their parent company Studio 100 planning to expand the franchise.

In late-July 2018, Studio 100 through its Munich-based global production and distribution division Studio 100 Media announced the launch of feature-focused German CGI animation production studio named Studio Isar Animation in order for Studio 100 to expand their film productions completely in-house with the new animation production studio being located at Studio 100's Munich-based headquarters which opened three months later in October of that same year.

In June 2019, Studio 100 had appointed Barbara Stephen, the managing director of its Australian entertainment and animation production subsidiary Flying Bark Productions, to become the CEO of content of its Australian international arm Studio 100 International and she would oversee all original content development, investment, and animation pipelines and assume executive management for all of development, investment and animation production across the creative businesses across Studio 100's main international subsidiaries which are its French animation division Studio 100 Animation, the CGI-feature animation production unit Studio Isar Animation and New York-based American production studio Little Airplane Productions and Studio 100 had backed the expansion of Flying Bark Productions' in-house animation capacities as it appointed Alexia Gates-Foale as head of production.

The theme park division, Plopsa, also grew significantly. After taking full control of Plopsaland in 2005, they opened a couple of new theme parks in Hasselt (2005), Dalen (2010) and co-opened a theme park in Torzym (2018). The division also owned theme parks in Stavelot (2005), Haßloch (2010), Antwerp (2019), and created water parks in De Panne (2015) and Hannuit-Landen (2020). With expansions planned in four countries: Belgium, Poland, the Czech Republic, and the Netherlands.

On 7 February 2020, the ownership of the group shifted again when Vic Swerts and 3D Investors acquired 17% and 8% of the shares respectively. After the transaction Gert Verhulst, Hans Bourlon and BNP Paribas Fortis Private Equity had a remaining 25% share each.

In 2020, their animation studio Flying Bark Productions opened a second studio in Los Angeles.

In December 2020, Studio 100 announced their restructuring of its international businesses and announced that their New York-based American animation studio Little Airplane Productions's founder and CEO Josh Selig alongside CCO Sharon Gomes had left the acquired American animation studio with the co-CEOs Studio 100's international division Studio 100 Media which were Martin Krieger and Barbara Stephen (who is also the president of Studio 100's fellow Australian studio Flying Bark Productions) taking over as the new CEOs of the New York-based animation studio in order for Studio 100 to launch more streamlined international operations during the COVID-19 impact on Studio 100's businesses.

In March 2023, Studio 100 announced the separation of the CEO of their theme park subsidiary Plopsa, Steve Van den Kerkhof after 23 years following the investigation of his toxic behaviour and relationship with Koen Clement taken over Studio 100's theme park subsidiary Plopsa as its intern CEO. Two months later in June of that year, Studio 100 announced that they have shuttered down its New York-based Animation animation production subsidiary Little Airplane Productions with them would be "closing shop" and that its studio space would be replaced by a new company called "Terribly Terrific! Productions" (founded by former Art Directors from Little Airplane).

In October 2023, Studio 100 through its global distribution division Studio 100 Media announced their entry into the Spanish animation business by acquiring a stake in Tenerife, Canary Islands-based Spanish animation studio 3 Doubles Producciones as their Spanish animation production studio with Studio 100 Media co-producing and distributing its films and animated series internationally.

In March 2024, Studio 100 entered a major rebrand and announced that they have rebranded their Munich-based global production and international distribution division Studio 100 Media as they renamed it under the new name "Studio 100 International" including their redesigned logo alongside the rebrand of its website and reflecting their expanded role for the entire Studio 100 group with the parent group launching their redesigned logo for its parent alongside their own divisions. The name "Studio 100 International" was previously used by their Benelux division before being renamed to Studio 100 Benelux with the rebranded division announcing a first-look production and distribution partnership with French animation studio Gaumont Animation to co-produce animated shows and feature films with Studio 100.

In September 2024, Studio 100's international distribution division Studio 100 International remastered its library of their classic 1970s animated productions into full HD and brought them into 16:9 widescreen and full HD formats for the first time using AI upscaling process as part of Studio 100's bigger promotional campaign to celebrate its properties multi-generational appeal.

At the start of October 2025, Studio 100's international distribution arm Studio 100 International entered a strategic alliance with French digital-first kids' entertainment company Animaj to reimagine Studio 100's most famous children's brand Maya the Bee to shape the future of the franchise. As part of the deal, French entertainment company Animaj had acquired Studio 100's rights to the property including the 1975, 1979 (excluding Japan) and 2012 TV series outside of Belgium and German-speaking countries as part of Animaj's international strategy to acquire international IPs and turn them into global franchises with Studio 100 partnering with Animaj to expand the brand to digital and international footprint using the latter's GenAI animation production tools that would lead the franchise's future series content development and international expansion, Studio 100 retained the production, international sales and feature film rights to the Maya the Bee films that they produced including its spin-off Arnie & Barney and would continue overseeing global theme park rights to the franchise in its home country Belgium and German-speaking countries.

== Divisions ==
=== Studio 100 International ===
Studio 100 International
- Formerly: Studio 100 Media (2007–2024)
- Type: Division
- Industry: Distribution
- Predecessor: Telescreen BV (1983–2020); TV-Loonland AG (1989–2011); EM.Entertainment (1989–2008); Made 4 Entertainment (2003–2020)
- Founded: June 4, 2007; 19 years ago
- Founder: Patrick Elmendorff; Hans Bourlon
- Headquarters: Munich, Germany
- Key people: Martin Krieger (president and CEO)
- Parent: Studio 100
- Divisions: Studio 100 Film
- Subsidiaries: 3Doubles Producciones; Studio Isar Animation
- Website: www.studio100international.com

Studio 100 International (formerly known as Studio 100 Media) is the German international distribution division of Belgian production group Studio 100 that distributes Studio 100's productions worldwide. The Munich-based distribution division was founded in June 2007, when its Belgian children's entertainment parent Studio 100 expanded its productions operations into Germany and entered the worldwide distribution services with the formation of its own in-house international distribution division based in Munich entitled Studio 100 Media with Studio 100's co-founder Hans Bourlon serving as co-president with Patrick Elmendorff, former managing director of the children's entertainment division of German media group EM.TV, EM.Entertainment (which Studio 100 Media would acquire it a year later in 2008), had joined Studio 100's newly launched distribution arm Studio 100 Media as MD and co-president.

On February 27, 2008, one year after the establishment of Studio 100's German distribution division Studio 100 Media and three months before the acquisition of EM.Entertainment by Studio 100 Media's Belgian parent company Studio 100, Studio 100 Media established a distribution partnership with Munich-based German entertainment production and distribution company EM.Sport Media AG under the latter's entertainment production division EM.Entertainment to distribute their entertainment portfolio including their classics such as Maya the Bee and Vic the Viking on TV, home entertainment and VOD platforms internationally excluding US, Germany, Australia, New Zealand, the distribution partnership had reunited Studio 100 Media's president and founder Patrick Elmendorff with EM.Entertainment with him leading their joint distribution team.

In February 2008 three months before the acquisition of EM.Entertainment by Studio 100 Media's parent company Studio 100, Studio 100 Media established a distribution partnership with Munich-based German entertainment production and distribution company EM.Sport Media AG under the latter's entertainment production division EM.Entertainment to distribute their entertainment portfolio including their classics such as Maya the Bee and Vic the Viking on TV, home entertainment and VOD platforms internationally excluding US, Germany, Australia, New Zealand.

In May 2008, Studio 100 Media signed a worldwide distribution partnership with British children's TV channel CBBC to distribute the latter's three in-house programming which were Trapped!, The Slammer and Beat the Boss, internationally except for the United States, Latin America and the UK.

Also in that same month of that year following Studio 100 Media's successful distribution partnership with EM.Sport Media AG's EM.Entertainment division, Studio 100 Media's parent Belgian/German production and international distribution group Studio 100 announced that they have acquired EM.Sport Media AG's entertainment division EM.Entertainment and its library along with the latter's Australian entertainment & animation production studio Flying Bark Productions and their German television channel JuniorTV (which Studio 100's parent company Studio 100 would eventually close in 2022) for €41 million in order for EM.Sport Media AG to focus on its sport activities, the acquisition of EM.Entertainment expanded Studio 100's kids & family programme library and gave Studio 100 an Australia-based in-house entertainment & animation production studio and a German-language television channel as an entry into the broadcasting industry for Studio 100 Media's parent company Studio 100 outside of Belgium in which predates the launch of Studio 100 TV by its parent company with Studio 100 Media had taken over EM.Entertainment's distribution library including Yoram Gross's animated productions such as Blinky Bill alongside EM.Entertainment's classic catalogue such as Maya the Bee and Vic the Viking and the library of Japanese animation studio Zuiyo.

In November 2008 following Studio 100 Media's acquisition of German kids and family entertainment division EM.Entertainment from EM.Sport Media AG back in May of that year, Studio 100 Media announced that its director of international productions and broadcast Dominique Neudecker (which joined Studio 100 Media following the EM.Entertainment acquisition in May) had stepped down the distribution division of Studio 100.

In March 2009, Studio 100 Media had appointed former Universal Studios Consumer Products head of licensing and former managing director of Tele Muchen's licensing unit CTM, Peter Kleinschmidt, to become its director of marketing, licensing and merchandising of Studio 100's brands such as House of Anubis. However Peter Kleinschmidt would later leave Studio 100 Media a few months later in late-July of that year as Studio 100 Media's co-founder and managing director Patrick Elmendorff assuming the role.

Two days later on the 29th in that same month, Studio 100 Media (whom had already owned the classic German/Japanese 1975 anime Maya the Honey Bee, which was made by Japanese animation studio Zuiyo, since the acquisition of the classic 1975 anime alongside EM.Sport Media AG's former children's production unit EM.Entertainment and the Zuiyo catalogue one year prior back in May 2008) had brought out the remaining rights to the Maya the Bee franchise (outside of publishing) from the German public foundation, The Waldemar Bonsels Foundation, the acquisition of the entire rights to Maya the Bee had gained Studio 100 Media access to produce new film and television and stage show adaptations to the franchise.

In May 2013, Studio 100 Media announced the establishment of a dedicated film production and international sales distribution division that would handle in-house theatrical feature film production and international sales entitled Studio 100 Film, the new feature film sales division would expand the focus of strategic focus into the international movie business for both animated and live-action projects produced by its Belgian parent Studio 100 as well as film made by outside producers with Studio 100 Media's managing director and CEO Patrick Elmendorff and the latter's business operations head Thorsten Wegener served as president of Studio 100 Media's feature film sales unit Studio 100 Film, with its first production was the German/Australian animated film Maya the Bee: The Movie following the success of Studio 100's animation division's adaptation of the TV series of the same name.

On 31 March 2016, Studio 100 Media partnered with Qatari entertainment network beIN Media Group to launch a dedicated kids and family channel in the MENA region called beJunior which launched a day later on 1 April 2016, the new television channel beJunior will broadcast programming from Studio 100's library including its new programming state like Arthur and the Minimoys and Nils Holgersson (which there produced by Studio 100's in-house French animation studio Studio 100 Animation) with Studio 100 Media providing branding for the new channel.

In late-January 2017 nine years after Studio 100 Media's acquisition of EM.Sport Media AG's German kids and family production and distribution division EM.Entertainment including its German TV channel Junior and Australian animation studio Flying Bark Productions, Studio 100 Media had established a deal to acquire a 68% majority stake in German brand management and media production and distribution company Made 4 Entertainment (M4E AG) the producer of Mia and Me and the owner of the libraries of the former German distributor TV-Loonland AG and Danish animation outfit Egmont Imagination alongside its Dutch distribution subsidiary Telescreen in a deal that could combine the expanded catalogue of Studio 100 Media's parent company Studio 100 with Made 4 Entertainment (m4e)'s wider library which would make the former as the biggest kids and family entertainment content companies across Europe with Made 4 Entertainment (m4e) would continue to invest their new content and its global expansion. A month later in late-February of that same year, Studio 100 Media announced that they have completed their acquisition of a 68% majority stake in German brand management and media production and distribution company Made 4 Entertainment (M4E AG) the producer of Mia and Me and the owner of the libraries of the former German distributor TV-Loonland AG and Danish animation outfit Egmont Imagination alongside its Dutch distribution subsidiary Telescreen, making it a subsidiary of Studio 100 Media with Made 4 Entertainment (M4E)'s CEO and founder Hans Ulrich Stoef continued to lead the acquired company through Studio 100 Media. Studio 100 Media would eventually increase their stake of Made 4 Entertainment (m4e) and later took full control after selling and spinning off some of M4E's subsidiaries three years later in 2020.

Later in that same month following the acquisition of a majority stake in German kids and family brand management and media entertainment company m4e AG by Studio 100 Media, Studio 100 Media had announced that its president, Patrick Elmendorff, had departed the distribution division with m4e's founder Hans Ulrich Stoef had been named as president of Studio 100 Film and its parent Studio 100 Media whilst founder of Studio 100 Film's Belgian parent Studio 100 and co-MD, Hans Bourlon, managed its distribution parent and continued to lead the distribution division with Hans Ulrich Stoef. Nine months later in October of that year, Studio 100 Media alongside its brand management and media production subsidiary m4e had restructured their international licensing team with Studio 100 Media's licensing team merged with those of m4e as m4e's commercial director Peter Kleinschmidt returning to Studio 100's German international subsidiary Studio 100 Media with him assuming the title of Commercial Director of newly merged international licensing team of Studio 100 Media and m4e's licensing of their programming portfolio with him handling licensing of brands such as Mia and Me and Maya the Bee, meanwhile Esra Sahin had joined the distribution division and been named international licensing manager while Sara Acquier, of Studio 100's Paris-based French animation division Studio 100 Animation, became head of licensing at France.

In late-July 2018 one year after the acquisition of a majority stake in German media management, production and distribution company Made 4 Entertainment (M4E) by Studio 100 Media, Studio 100 Media announced the launch of feature-focused German CGI animation studio named Studio Isar Animation in order for Studio 100 Media's parent company Studio 100 to expand their film productions completely in-house with the new animation production studio being located at Studio 100's Munich-based headquarters which opened three months later in October of that same year.

Also in that year Studio 100 Media increased their stake in its subsidiary M4E to 95% and one year in late-January 2019 two years after Studio 100 Media had brought a majority stake in M4E back in February 2017, M4E and its parent Studio 100 Media announced that its CEO of and M4E's co-founder Ulli Stoef would step down his role of CEO in June while Hans Bourlon, co-founder of Studio 100 Media's parent Studio 100 would assume the role of the distribution division's management team while a new CEO will be announced.

Seven months later in September of that year, during the annual Cartoon Forum held in that same year, Studio 100 Media and its subsidiary m4e partnered with Blue Zoo Animation Studio, which Studio 100 Media and its subsidiary m4e had distributed the Dutch/British CGI-animated series Miffy's Adventures Big and Small with Blue Zoo and co-produced it with Dutch holding company Mercis BV, to produce a CGI-animated preschool series entitled Monika's Garden, but no news for that series was made since.

One month in July of that year, Studio 100 Media named Martin Krieger (who had previously headed Studio 100 Media's global distribution) as their new CEO of Studio 100's global international distribution division Studio 100 Media alongside its subsidiaries Made 4 Entertainment (M4E) which Studio 100 Media acquired two years ago in February 2017, Studio 100 Film and Munich-based CGI feature animation production studio Studio Isar Animation which was launched one year before, marking Martin Krieger's return to the distribution division Studio 100 Media and its parent Studio 100 after he departed a year prior in 2018.

In April 2021, Studio 100 Media entered a partnership with Mediatoon Licensing, the licensing division of Média-Participations' owned French distribution subsidiary Mediatoon Distribution, to represent Mediatoon's franchises mainly from Mediatoon Distribution's programming catalogue including those made by Média-Participations' in-house animation production subsidiaries which are Dargaud Media, Dupuis Edition & Audiovisuel and Ellipsanime Productions and publishing catalogues of both Dupuis and Dargaud such as Lucky Luke to the German-speaking territories and other Central Europe territories to expand its international presence.

In April 2022, Studio 100 Media teamed up with ZDF Studios, the Mainz-based commercial and distribution arm of German's largest public broadcaster ZDF, to launch a new international channel brand that would bring Studio 100's extensive kids and family programming catalogue from Studio 100 (mainly from the EM.Entertainment and Made 4 Entertainment (M4E) libraries) such as Maya the Bee, Mia and Me and Heidi together with ZDF Studios' kids and family programming catalogue under one streaming channel brand named Pash and was launched on Amazon Prime Channels in the UK, Italy and Spain with further territories with the two companies planning to launch their joint venture channel brand in other territories. Three years later in late-September 2025, Studio 100 International had expanded its streaming international content pact with ZDF's production/distribution division ZDF Studios for their joint-venture streaming service Pash, with programming from both Studio 100 International and ZDF Studios being available on ZDF Studios' own pay-streaming service ZDF Select and ZDF's own streaming app and online platform ZDFtivi

Three month later in July 2022, Studio 100 Media had partnered with Dutch global media and broadcasting company SPI International for the digital exploitation to bring Studio 100 Media's 2D traditionally-animated series from its EM.Entertainment programming catalogue mainly the library of the Japanese animation company Zuiyo Enterprise including the 1974 anime Heidi, Girl of the Alps and the 1975 German/Japanese TV series Maya the Honey Bee, the deal had gained SPI International AVOD & SVOD rights to Studio 100 Media's 2D-animated programming catalogue from its EM.Entertainment library as it became available on SPI's streaming platforms worldwide such as FilmBox except for a few countries per program.

In March 2023, Studio 100 Media signed a worldwide first-look production and distribution partnership with Gaumont Animation, the animation division of French film studio Gaumont, to co-produce and distribute programming a state of upcoming animated series starting with Ash which the two companies co-produce with BigChild Entertainment and Tiny Head (a series Gaumont Animation is co-producing with American entertainment studio Cloudco Entertainment) in which Studio 100 Media will handle distribution to the upcoming series internationally as part of the partnership.

In October 2023, Studio 100 Media had entered the Spanish animation market with the acquisition of a stake in Spanish animation production and VFX company based in Santa Cruz de Tenerife, Canary Islands, Spain, 3Doubles Producciones, whom Studio 100 Media previously collaborated on its feature films which were Mia and Me: The Hero of Centopia and Giants of La Mancha, marking Studio 100 Media's entry into the Spanish entertainment services and gained its own in-house animation unit alongside its Belgian parent Studio 100 with Studio 100 Media will produce feature films and series with 3Doubles Producciones along with Los-Angeles-based film distributor Viva Pictures via its kids and family arm Viva Kids with Studio 100 Media would handle international sales while the latter handling distribution in North America.

In March 2024 when Studio 100 Media's parent company Studio 100 entered a major rebranding, Studio 100 Media was renamed to Studio 100 International as adopted their redesigned company logo like its parent alongside its relaunch of their website and reflecting their expanded role for the entire Studio 100 group. The name "Studio 100 International" was previously used by Studio 100's Benelux division before being renamed to Studio 100 Benelux with the rebranded division expanded its first-look production and distribution partnership with French animation studio Gaumont Animation the animation division of French film studio Gaumont to co-produce animated shows and feature films with Studio 100.

In May 2024 two months following Studio 100 Media's rebranding to Studio 100 International back in March of that same year, Studio 100 International established its own nostalgic YouTube channel dedicated to take teens and young adults on a retroistic trip to their childhood named Studio 100 – Heroes of Childhood which had launched in April of that year as many of the programming from Studio 100 International's catalogue mainly from the EM.Entertainment library including the library of Japanese animation studio Zuiyo such as Maya the Bee and Vic the Viking being placed on their new YouTube channel. In addition to clips of the original series from the 1970s and 1980s from Studio 100 International's catalogue new character specials, shorts and compilations will be uploaded to the channel every week and Studio 100 International had created its fashion line and a dedicated online merchandising store called Heroes of Childhood, the newly founded online store and merchandise fashion line featured many designs of its characters and it became available on its dedicated online store alongside other online shopping platforms such as Amazon Shopping.

On October 1, 2024, Studio 100 International alongside its feature film international distribution and sales agency division Studio 100 Film had jointly appointed former Telepool-owned Global Screen (now Global Constellation) manager of international sales, acquisitions and marketing Lucrecia Magnanini to become its manager of sales and acquisitions for international feature film projects made by Studio 100 International's feature film international distribution arm Studio 100 Film and will handle film slate and theatrical sales for Studio 100 Film. Two days later on the third of that same month, Studio 100 International and its feature film distribution and sales agency division Studio 100 Film had announced the first major feature film spin-off to the successful Maya the Bee franchise, centering on the fan-favourite recurring ant characters Arnie and Barney entitled Arnie & Barney: The Water Quest, The Umbilical Brothers had reprised their roles of the titular characters from the previous three films while Studio 100 International set to produce the spin-off alongside its feature film subsidiary Studio Isar Animation and Canary Islands-based Spanish animation production portfolio 3Doubles Producciones, which Studio 100 International had brought a stake a year prior back in October 2023, and Studio 100 Film would handle worldwide sales to the film.

At the start of October 2025, Studio 100 International signed a stragic production alliance with French digital-first kids' entertainment company and the owner behind the Spanish preschool franchise Pocoyo, Animaj, to reimagine Studio 100's most famous children's brand Maya the Bee to shape the future of the franchise. As part of the deal, French entertainment company Animaj had acquired Studio 100's rights to the property including the 1975, 1979 (excluding Japan) and 2012 TV series outside of Belgium and German-speaking countries as part of Animaj's international strategy to acquire international IPs and turn them into global franchises with Studio 100 partnering with Animaj to expand the brand to digital and international footprint using the latter's GenAI animation production tools that would lead the franchise's future series content development and international expansion, Studio 100 retained the production, international sales and feature film rights to the Maya the Bee films that they produced including its spin-off Arnie & Barney and would continue overseeing global theme park rights to the franchise in its home country Belgium and German-speaking countries.

On January 28, 2026, Studio 100 International had signed its major content deal with ProSiebenSat.1 Media's streaming service Joyn to bring Studio 100 International's film and television programming catalogue including content from Belgian parent Studio 100 alongside those from the libraries of the predecessors which are Sport1 Medien's former children's entertainment production unit EM.Entertainment and German kids and family entertainment and media and brand management company Made 4 Entertainment including Miffy alongside its famous brands from the Flying Bark Productions library such as Blinky Bill on the streaming service which had been available free on the streaming service Joyn.

==== Made 4 Entertainment ====
Made 4 Entertainment AG
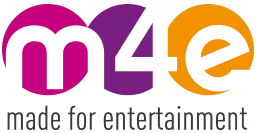
- Formerly: Made 4 Entertainment GmbH (2003–2007)
- Type: Subsidiary
- Traded as: FWB: MU4G
- Industry: Television
- Founded: November 2003; 23 years ago
- Founders: Hans Ulrich Stoef; Michael Büettner; Oliver Jansen; Cees Wessels; Ulli Stoef
- Defunct: 2020; 6 years ago
- Fate: Folded into Studio 100 Media
- Successor: Studio 100 Media
- Headquarters: Munich, Germany

Made 4 Entertainment AG, also known as M4E GmbH, was the German international brand management and media production and distribution subsidiary of Studio 100 Media in which to be owned by Belgian production group Studio 100 that specializes in children's and family entertainment and manages brands and licenses products. It was founded in November 2003 by Hans Ulrich Stoef, Michael Büttner, Oliver Jansen, Cees Wessels and Ulli Sotef.

By July 2007, Made 4 Entertainment (M4E) entered publication on the Frankfurt Stock Exchange to booster their expanded properties. Three months later in October 2007, Made 4 Entertainment (M4E) established a joint venture production company with Berlin-based German animation studio Hahn Film AG named Lucky Punch with m4e handling finance and distribution rights to the projects with their joint venture company Lucky Punch AG.

In April 2008, Made 4 Entertainment (M4E) signed a five-year co-production partnership with Italian animation production company Rainbow to develop and produce television series with M4E granting the rights to then-upcoming season of Rainbow's series Winx Club and its then-upcoming spin-off Pixie (now PopPixie) as the former would manage distribution to the two series alongside Rainbow whilst M4E and Rainbow would co-produce a new television series.

In September 2008, Made 4 Entertainment (M4E) launched its own home entertainment label named m4e Home Entertainment to handle its third-party properties on DVD in Germany with m4e's partner EuroVideo handling DVD sales.

In December 2008, Made 4 Entertainment (M4E) AG announced the acquisition of Dutch production and distribution company Telescreen, the acquisition of Telescreen included the library of Danish animation outfit Egmont Imagination and it also marked m4e's expansion into the Dutch television distribution industry and gave m4e their own Dutch international distribution subsidiary outside of m4e's region Germany with Telescreen retaining its properties whilst m4e's productions will now be distributed by the acquired company. One year later on February 19, 2009, following M4E's acquisition of Telescreen back in December 2008, m4e announced a restructure of their operations by merging their distribution activities with the distribution business of its Dutch international production and distribution subsidiary Telescreen with them taking international distribution of M4E's TV, new media and home entertainment rights outside of Germany-speaking territories as M4E launching a content and production management division under Lisette Looman's leadership with Telescreen's licensing division Telescreen Licensing & Merchandising was renamed to Telescreen Consumer Products and been placed under the new division following the restructuring. A month later on March 31 following M4E's restructure of Telescreen, M4E and its Dutch subsidiary Telescreen acquired the worldwide rights to the Pinkeltje franchise.

In April 2011, Made 4 Entertainment (M4E) AG through its television division m4e Television acquired the programme catalogue of German brand management and distributor TV-Loonland AG including the libraries of Sony Wonder's television division and American animation studio Sunbow Entertainment and British animation unit Teleimagination alongside Loonland's assets after when TV-Loonland filled for bankruptcy protection four months prior in December 2010 effectively expanded M4E's portfolio, the acquisition of the TV-Loondland AG library including the catalogues of Sony Wonder's television division and American animation studio Sunbow Entertainment and the Teleimagination library had effectively expanded M4E's programming catalogue as it became part of M4E's portfolio with them along with its Dutch distribution subsidiary Telescreen began distributing internationally the acquired library.

In August 2012, M4E planned to launch a dedicated children's television channel that was to be launched on terrestrial television, but no plans of a dedicated of the new channel had been announced since then.

By March 2015 when Mia and Me was renewed for a third season before the broadcast of season 2 in Germany and other countries was slated, Made 4 Entertainment (m4e) alongside German animation studio Hahn Film AG rebranded their joint-venture production company Lucky Punch as Hahn & m4e Productions. One week later in April of that same year, Made 4 Entertainment (M4E) extended their partnership between Gerald Hahn and his animation studio Hahn Film AG of its joint venture production subsidiary Hahn & m4e Productions who produced Mia and Me had become the exclusive outlet for both companies with Hahn & m4e Productions producing their projects.

On April 29, 2016, Made 4 Entertainment (m4e) announced that Michael Büettner, co-founder and CFO of the German brand media management and brand entertainment studio, had depatured the company after establishing the company 13 years ago in 2003 as M4E had appointed Johannes Walzer, commercial manager and authorized officer of Munich technology company Refined Labs to assume the role of CFO of the company.

A month and a half later in June 2016, Made 4 Entertainment (m4e) who produced the CGI/live-action property Mia and Me through Hahn & m4e Productions had acquired a 54% majority international rights stake in the popular show from its Italian production partner Rainbow S.p.A. as m4e was planning to grow its IP to other countries with Rainbow retaining the distribution rights to the show in Italy. One month later in July of that year, Made 4 Entertainment (m4e) whom its Dutch-based distribution subsidiary Telescreen had a long-running partnership with Mercis BV for the Miffy franchise, distributed the CGI-animated series Miffy's Adventures Big and Small and co-produced the film Miffy the Movie, had signed a deal with Amsterdam-based Dutch holding company Mercis BV to handle the licensing and merchandise rights to the Miffy franchise for the German-speaking territories.

In July 2017 following Belgian production and distribution company Studio 100's acquisition of a majority stake in m4e back in February, Made 4 Entertainment (m4e) expanded their partnership with YouTube by launching a new channel named Made 4 Kids TV that would bring all of M4E's entire children's programming catalogue mainly from the TV-Loonland AG, Telescreen and Egmont Imagination libraries including the Mia and Me franchise and Wissper into one global YouTube channel with M4E planning to upload its catalogue to the new Made 4 Kids TV platform channel. Three months later in October of that year, m4e alongside its international distribution parent Studio 100 Media had restructured their international licensing team with m4e's licensing team combined with those of Studio 100 Media as m4e's commercial director Peter Kleinschmidt rejoining m4e's German international distribution parent Studio 100 Media with him assuming the title of Commercial Director of newly merged international licensing team of Studio 100 Media and m4e's licensing of their programming portfolio with him handling licensing of brands such as Mia and Me and Maya the Bee meanwhile Esra Sahin had joined m4e's distribution parent Studio 100 Media via international licensing manager while Sara Acquier, of Studio 100's Paris-based French animation division Studio 100 Animation, became head of licensing at France.

In January 2019, years after Studio 100 Media had brought a majority stake in m4e back in February 2017, m4e and its parent Studio 100 Media announced that its CEO of M4E's parent Studio 100 and co-founder of m4e, Ulli Stoef would step down his role of CEO in June.

Seven months later in September of that year, during the annual Cartoon Forum held in that same year, m4e and its distribution parent Studio 100 Media partnered with British animation production company Blue Zoo Animation Studio, whom m4e had previously co-produced and distributed Miffy's Adventures Big and Small with the London-based studio, to produce a CGI-animated preschool series entitled Monika's Garden, but no news for that series was made since.

==== Studio Isar Animation ====
Studio Isar Animation
- Industry: Animation production
- Founded: July 31, 2018; 8 years ago
- Founders: Ulli Stoef; Thorsten Wegener
- Headquarters: Munich, Germany
- Key people: Martin Krieger
- Parent: Studio 100 International
- Website: www.isaranimation.com

Studio Isar Animation is a CGI film-focused animation production subsidiary of Studio 100 International that handles animation production services for Studio 100's in-house feature-length animated movies and television series. It is based in Neumarkter Street, Munich where its parent, Studio 100 International is headquartered.

===== Formation =====
It was launched in late-July 2018 when Studio 100 through its Munich-based global production and distribution division Studio 100 International (which was named Studio 100 Media until 2024) announced the launch of feature-focused German CGI animation studio named Studio Isar Animation in order for Studio 100 to expand their film productions completely in-house with the new animation production studio being located at Studio 100's Munich-based headquarters which opened three months later in October of that same year.

===== Filmography =====
Title	Release date	Distributor	Notes
Maya the Bee: The Golden Orb	7 January 2021	Leonine Distribution; StudioCanal (Australia)	co-production with Studio 100 Film, Studio 100 Media, Flying Bark Productions and Studio B Animation
Mia and Me: The Hero of Centopia	26 May 2022 (Germany); 27 October 2022 (Australia)	Constantin Film; Icon Film Distribution (Australia)	co-production with Flying Bark Productions, Studio 100 Media, Studio 100 Film, Constantin Film, Studio B Animation and Hahn Film AG
Giants of La Mancha	1 May 2024 (Germany); 8 August 2024 (Argentina)	Constantin Film; GF Films (Argentina)	co-production with Studio 100 International, Studio 100 Film, 3Doubles Producciones, GF Films, GGVFX and M.A.R.K.13 Film
Heidi: Rescue of the Lynx	3 July 2025	Leonine Distribution; Selecta Vision (Spain)	A feature-length film continuation of Studio 100's Heidi by Studio 100 Animation, Jan Van Rijsselberge and Christel Gonnard; Based on the novel Heidi by Johanna Spyri co-production with Studio 100 International, Studio 100 Film, 3Doubles Producciones and Hotel Hungaria Animation
Arnie and Barney: The Water Quest	3 September 2026	Port-au-Prince Pictures	A spin-off of the Maya the Bee franchise by Waldemar Bonsels co-production with Studio 100 Film, Studio 100 International, 3Doubles Producciones and Telegael
Dougie Dolittle	2028	TBA	co-production with Studio 100 Film, Studio 100 International, 3Doubles Producciones and Caligari Film

==== 3Doubles Producciones ====
3Doubles Producciones is a Spanish entertainment animation and VFX studio jointly owned by Studio 100 International and Viva Pictures that is based in Santa Cruz de Tenerife, Canary Islands, Spain. Established in 2017 the studio specialize in producing high-quality animated feature films and TV series, offering services from development to post-production and its best known for producing international co-productions.

== See also ==
- List of assets owned by Studio 100
- List of Studio 100 productions
