= Sport1 Medien =

German media company

Sport1 Medien AG
- Formerly: EM.TV & Merchandising AG (1989–2004); EM.TV AG (2004–2007); EM.Sport Media AG (2007–2009); Constantin Medien AG (2009–2020)
- Founded: 1989; 37 years ago
- Headquarters: Ismaning, Germany
- Key people: Olaf Schroder (president); Paul Graf (Supervisory board)
- Revenue: €119 million (2018)
- Owner: Highlight Communications
- Number of employees: 583 (2018)
- Website: https://www.sport1-medien.de/en/

Sport1 Medien AG (previously known as EM.TV & Merchandising AG, EM.Sport Media AG and Constantin Medien AG) is a German international media company that has a strong focus on the sports and entertainment sectors. It's based in Ismaning near Munich and it operates a multi-channel sports platform in German-speaking countries, including free and pay-TV, online services, social media, and digital radio under the SPORT1 brand, and also offers content solutions, event organizing, and marketing services for sports and entertainment. The company formerly owned its kids & family entertainment division including its children TV channel Junior TV and its Australian production studio Flying Bark Productions until 2008 & its the former owner of American entertainment company The Jim Henson Company before selling it in 2003.

== History ==
=== Beginnings and major acquisition success ===
- 1989 - EM.TV was founded by Thomas Haffa. The name "EM.TV" stands for "Entertainment, Merchandising, TV."
- 1996 - The company created Junior, a company and TV channel that held licenses to most of the animated TV shows in the library of the KirchGruppe, the Media Group of Leo Kirch, where Thomas Haffa started his career.

In 1997, EM.TV went public and started to expand in various businesses.

In late-July 1996, EM.TV & Merchandising had joined forced with KirchGroup to jointly establish a new dedicated pay-TV children's channel entitled Junior.TV, prior to that KirchGroup used the Junior brand for distributing KirchGroup's programming catalogue including the library of the Japanese anime studio Zuiyo & its programming originally distributed by Kirch's now-independent subsidiary-turned production company Beta Film GmBh & KirchGroup's defunct in-house German distribution unit TaurusFilm, such as Maya the Honey Bee and Heidi, Girl of the Alps, when it was first used starting in 1994. However two years later in December 1998, EM.TV & Merchandising signed a 50/50 landmark deal with KirchGroup to bring the Junior brand under a new joint-venture production/distribution subsidiary entitled Junior as EM.TV & Merchandising had brought a 50% stake in the latter's programming catalogue alongside the library of the Japanese anime studio Zuiyo Enterprise placing it under the new joint-venture production/distribution subsidiary Junior.

In October 1997, EM.TV & Merchandising announced a production partnership with Australian animation studio Yoram Gross-Village Roadshow the producer of Blinky Bill to co-produce 10 of the Australian animation studio's animated series with EM.TV handling distribution and merchandising the 10 animated projects outside of Australia. Their successful partnership with them lead to EM.TV acquiring a 50% stake in the Australian animation studio Yoram Gross-Village Roadshow from both Australian company Village Roadshow (when they exited the television production) two years later in March 1999 renaming it to Yoram Gross EM.TV as their own Australian animation studio with its founders Yoram and Sandra Gross retaining their 50% stake in the rebranded animation studio.

By 1998, EM.TV & Merchandising formed a partnership with Israeli entertainment production company Talit Communications to bring EM.TV's kids & family programming catalogue and eventually formalized a major pact to sell and market cartoon merchandising and television broadcasting rights in Israel. It became a massive success as it led to EM.TV & Merchandising acquiring a 50% stake in Talit Communications in December 1999, further increasing EM.TV's Junior programming library with the two companies planning to launch a dedicated pay-TV channel in Israel under the Junior.TV name.

By late-April 1999 during the MIPTV market in Cannes, EM.TV announced that they were in final negotiations to export its newly packaged Junior brand globally & planning to launch the Junior brand worldwide under its banner Junior.TV.; The expansion of the Junior brand happened five months later in September of that year, when EM.TV & Merchandising signed a deal with Swiss broadcasting television network SF DRS in Switzerland to broadcast EM.TV's Junior programming library on SF DRS's television channel TV3

Near the end of June 1999, EM.TV & Merchandising, who already have its joint-venture TV channel with KirchGroup for Junior, had increased the Junior brand outside of pay television by signing a deal with free-to-air TV channel Sat.1 to bring its Junior.TV programming for the free-to-air TV channel under the Junior brand whilst EM.TV plans to launch its own kids & family website under the Junior brand.

In August 1999, EM.TV & Merchandising announced that they have taken a 25% stake in German independent film production company Constantin Film including the latter's 51% stake in Olga Film, marking their entry into the feature film business and increasing their family entertainment business.

In September 1999, EM.TV & Merchandising further expanded the Junior brand as they entered a joint venture with Danish magazine publishing company Egmont to launch a publishing subsidiary that could bring EM.TV's productions under one roof named Junior.Publishing. One week later in that same month of the same year, EM.TV announced that they have acquired a 49% stake in German production and distribution company Tele München Gruppe (TMG) in order for the former to expand their children's entertainment library and its feature film activities; However, when EM.TV enterted a massive restructure following severe financial troubles and a massive debt restructuring process in 2001, EM.TV announced in February of that year that they were planning to sell its 49% stake in German film & television production/distribution company Tele München Gruppe (TMG) Three years later in December 2004, EM.TV had completed its diversture of Tele München Gruppe back to its president Herbert Kloiber.

In December 1999, EM.TV & Merchandising had entered a five-year co-production & co-financing partnership with German media fund and production-financing company Victory Media Management to produce animated films & television series with funding up to 100 animated children's television series over five years. The deal was later expanded a year later in October 2000, to include the co-financing of EM.TV's new internet platform Junior-Web. But however a year later in March 2001 when EM.TV was rescued by KirchGroup in that same year, EM.TV & Merchandising and Victory Media had ended their five-year co-production agreement.

- 2000 - When EM.TV's market capitalization was about €10 billion, the company acquired the Jim Henson Company and 50% of SLEC Ltd., the holding company of the famous Formula One racing series. Because of an option to purchase another 25% of SLEC Ltd. from Bernie Ecclestone for 1 Billion EUR, EM.TV had problems funding the transaction via the capital markets.
- Between late 2000, when the company reported incorrect quarterly results, and 2002, EM.TV's stock fell from its price of €120 EUR to penny stock status.

In February 2000, EM.TV enterted the American entertainment production industry by acquiring American entertainment company behind The Muppets, The Jim Henson Company, for $680 million. The acquisition had gained EM.TV its own American entertainment production subsidiary and further extending EM.TV's kids & family production operation as The Jim Henson Company became EM.TV own American production unit with EM.TV would handle distribution to future programming produced by the acquired American entertainment outfit The Jim Henson Company while president of The Jim Henson Company, Brian Henson, would remained chairman and gave up & handled the role of CEO to its president & CCO Charlie Rivkin.

In March 2000, EM.TV & Merchandising had purchased the company behind the famous Formula One worldwide racing competition series, Speed Promotions LTD., from Bernie Eccelstone alongside a multi-billion dollar acquisition of a 50% stake in its unit SLEC Holdings, the company that managed the television rights for Formula One. A year later near the end of February 2001, EM.TV & its new parent KirchGroup had jointly brought a 75% stake in Speed Promotions LTD's holding company & susbidiary, SLEC, the holding company for Formula One's commercial rights and in return EM.TV had gained full control of the broadcasting rights to Formula One and it continued to be broadcast free-to-air."EM.TV Gains Formula One Broadcast Rights". The Los Angeles Times. March 1, 2001.

One month later in April of that year during the MIP-TV event, EM.TV & Merchandising expanded the Junior brand by announcing a joint venture production subsidiary with Spanish film & television production/distribution subsidiary of Spanish publishing company Grupo Planeta, Planeta 2010 (now DeAPlaneta), to handle distribution of EM.TV's children's programming including those from the former's Australian & American subsidiaries Yoram Gross-EM.TV and The Jim Henson Company in Spain and Portugal with EM.TV and Planeta forming a Madrid-based Spanish joint-venture home entertainment & distribution/production subsidiary entitled Planeta Junior, marking EM.TV's entry into the Spanish film & TV production industry. Their partnership would be extended one year later in March 2001, when EM.TV formed an animation co-production partnership with Spanish film & television studio unit of Spanish publishing company Grupo Planeta, Planeta 2010, under their joint-venture production subsidiary Planeta Junior to handle distribution to the then-upcoming shows from EM.TV such as Old Tom (which was produced by its Australian studio Yoram Gross-EM.TV) for the Spanish and Portuguese territories.; EM.TV & Merchandising would later sell their joint venture Iberian entertainment production/distribution unit Planeta Junior to Italian publishing company De Agostini a year in August 2004 when Planeta Junior have been expanded into Italy through Italian publishing company & co-parent of DeaPlaneta, De Agostini, as the unit Planeta Junior had assumed all of distribution rights to EM.TV´s entire catalogue of children and youth entertainment for Italy, Spain and Portugal with EM.TV selling its 50% stake of its Iberian entertainment production/distribution joint-venture subsidiary and transferring it into DeAgostini and became a joint-venture between DeAPlaneta and DeAgostini.

In May 2000, EM.TV announced it had further increased the Junior.TV, by planning to launch its own internet service entitled Junior-Web in Germany before expanding the website to other countries; The website have been launched six months later in November of that year.

=== Financial losses and restructuring ===
In December 2000 when EM.TV & Merchandising suffered financial difficulties and its stock had been collapsed following their acquisitions, Bavaria-based German media company Kirch Group (who co-owns a joint venture programming catalog with EM.TV called Junior.TV) announced the acquisition of a majority stake in EM.TV & Merchandising saving EM.TV from bankruptcy and it gave KirchGroup a second media distribution group, in return KirchGroup had sold its 50% share of EM.TV's joint children's programming venture with Kirch, Junior.TV, whilst EM.TV had diverst 50% stake in the holding unit behind the Formula One racing series, SLEC, as EM.TV plans to sell its assets like its American entertainment company The Jim Henson Company; the deal was closed two months later in February 2001 as KirchGroup had completed its acquisition of a majority stake in EM.TV & Merchandising, and it gave EM.TV full control of their joint-venture children's programming brand Junior TV. In that same month EM.TV & Merchandising alongside its American entertainment company The Jim Henson Company sold their rights to the Sesame Street Muppets to American non-profit organisation Sesame Workshop giving them full control of the Sesame Street Muppets.

In March 2001 one year after EM.TV's acquisition of American entertainment company The Jim Henson Company and following Kirch Group's acquisition back in February of that same year, EM.TV & Merchandising was planning to sell their American entertainment company The Jim Henson Company following the sale of the rights to the Sesame Street Muppets to Sesame Workshop and EM.TV's major corporate restructure.

In April 2001 one year after EM.TV acquisition of 50% in Formula One holding company Speed Investments, EM.TV & Merchandising sold their 24.5% stake in Motorsports company and holding group of Formula One Speed Investments to EM.TV's parent Kirch Group

In June 2001, EM.TV & Merchandising exited the internet operations and announced that they have shut down their website Junior-Web, sold their internet activities division EM Interactive to German media fund Victory Media Group, who had already had a co-production pact with EM.TV & Merchandising until March two months prior, and had it renamed along with Junior-Web to InteractiveMedia with former banker Peter Kolb managing the renamed division as EM.TV will licence the Junior brand to them. A month later in late-July 2001 after EM.TV had brought The Jim Henson Company back in February 2000, EM.TV and their American entertainment subsidiary The Jim Henson Company sold the latter's 8% minority stake in Crown Media Holdings including their channel Odyssey Network to its investor Hallmark Entertainment and rebranded it to Hallmark Channel with EM.TV and their American entertainment subsidiary The Jim Henson Company striking a deal with Crown Media to license series from EM.TV's own library including their Henson library.

- 2001 - In September, Werner Klatten, the former CEO of Sat.1, became the new CEO of EM.TV. He restructured the company, announced that he would sell: SLEC holding (via Gerhard Gribkowsky); Jim Henson Company; and TMG; and directed the purchase of DSF, a German sports TV station. During the restructuring, the bondholders of a 1999-issued €400 million bond got nearly 60% in company stock in exchange for their bonds.

In November 2001 two years after EM.TV & Denmark-based Egmont jointly established Junior.Publishing, EM.TV announced their exiting of the publishing business by selling its 50% of their joint venture children's publishing company Junior.Publishing to Egmont Group giving Egmont full control of Junior.Publishing renaming it to Egmont Publishing so that EM.TV would focus on their core entertainment business.

In April 2003, EM.TV had sold its 16.4% stake in German independent film & television production/distribution company Constantin Film to Swiss home entertainment distributor Highlight Communications, who already held a stake in Constantin Film for €7.5 million and a loan “in single-digit million" as Highlight Communications became the majority shareholder in the German film & television production/distribution studio Constantin Film increasing its stake to 42.4% with EM.TV preparing to buy Kirch's sports TV channel DSF and internet platform Sport1.

In May 2003, EM.TV announced that they have sold their American entertainment company The Jim Henson Company, the then-owner behind The Muppets and Kermit the Frog, back to the Henson family for $78 million bringing back ownership of The Jim Henson Company to the hands of Henson family once more.

On January 26, 2004, EM.TV who had acquired a 50% in Kirch Group's children's programming library under EM.TV's joint venture children entertainment brand wirh KirchMedia, Junior, five years ago back in 1999 announced their planning to take full control of their joint venture programming library unit Junior.TV which they co-owned with KirchMedia with the former planning to acquire KirchMedia's remaining 50% of their joint venture programming catalogue unit Junior.TV. Seven months later in July of that year, EM.TV announced their completion of their remaining 50% stake of their joint-venture programming catalogue unit Junior.TV from its co-owner KirchMedia which it had entered bankruptcy that year bringing an end to EM.TV's partnership with Kirch with Junior.TV's programming library being placed under EM.TV's entertainment division.

At the start of November 2004, EM.TV created two subsidiaries, EM.Entertainment and EM.Sport.

In January 2006 seven years after EM.TV & Merchandising's acquisition of 50% of Australian animation studio Yoram Gross EM.TV along with their successful partnership with Australian producer Yoram Gross through EM.'s division EM.Entertainment, EM.TV & Merchandising under their entertainment division EM.Entertainment announced their full acquisition of the remaining 50% stake of Australian entertainment and animation studio joint venture Yoram Gross EM.TV from its founders Yoram Gross and his wife Sandra Gross giving EM. Entertainment full control of the Australian animation and production group. In October 2006 following their acquisition of the remaining 50% stake ten months before, Yoram Gross-EM.TV announced a restructuring and re-branding of the company under its current name to Flying Bark Productions with the rebranded company planning to expand their portfolio into the adult-animated and children's genre alongside their distribution division Yoram Gross Distribution which was also renamed to Flying Bark Distribution like their renamed company under EM.Entertainment.

In September 2006, EM.TV under its kids & family unit EM.Entertainment entered a agreement with British music & childrens group Chart Show Channels to broadcast EM.Entertainment's programming catalogue including those from Flying Bark on CSC's two children's TV channels Pop and Tiny Pop

- 2007 - The company purchased a stake in the Swiss media company Highlight Communications AG, which in 2008 was increased gradually to 47.3%.

On 29 March 2007, EM.TV under its kids & family entertainment arm EM.Entertainment signed a distribution agreement with British international network group Sparrowhawk Media Group to merge its distribution sales arm Sparrowhawk Distribution with EM.Entertainment's distribution activities.

In May 2007, EM.TV announced that they are planning to exit the children's entertainment business and to sell their children's division EM.Entertainment GmbH including their Australian entertainment & animation production studio Flying Bark Productions, its distribution library including Yoram Gross' animated productions such as Blinky Bill, the library of Japanese animation studio Zuiyo and its classic catalogue such as Maya the Bee and Vic the Viking and their German television channel Junior.

In July 2007, EM.TV & Merchandising's kids & family production arm EM.Entertainment had established its live stage entertainment subsidiary called Life on Stage Entertainment to develop & produce live stage shows and family entertainment events starting with the live stage comedy event adaptation of the 1975 German/Japanese animated TV series Maya the Bee, which was originally made by Japanese anime studio Zuiyo Enterprise in which it's library that EM.TV owns, as the new subsidiary Life on Stage Entertainment had colloarborated with the German TV channel Sat.1 to produce the televised stage adaptation of Maya the Bee for television starring the actors of Urmel, Dirk Bach and Annette Frier. Six days later of that same month and following EM.TV's annoncement to sell it's childrens entertainment arm EM.Entertainment and the German TV channel Junior.TV, EM.TV & Merchandising had been renamed into EM.Sport Media.

On January 31, 2008, EM.Sport Media AG had brought a 15% minority stake in Colonge-based outside motorsports production studio Wige Media to expand its own sport-based production activities, the acquisition of a 15% minotiry stake had lead EM.Sport Media into fortifieting its position as Germany’s biggest sport events production company as EM.Sport Media had gained access to Monacco & South African countries as it merged its broadcasting operations with Wige Media's sport production operations.

On February 26, 2008, one year after EM.TV & Merchandising changed its name to EM.Sport Media AG and three months before EM.Sport Media AG sold their entertainment division EM.Entertainment GmbH along with its library, EM.Sport Media AG under its entertainment production division EM.Entertainment established a distribution partnership with Belgian production company Studio 100 through the latter's Munich-based German international distribution division Studio 100 Media (now Studio 100 International) to distribute EM.Sport Media's entertainment portfolio including their classics such as Maya the Bee and Vic the Viking on TV, home entertainment and VOD platforms internationally excluding US, Germany, Australia, New Zealand.

In May 2008, Indian media congolomete Zee Telefilms entered a bid to acquire EM.Sport Media AG's kids & family entertainment division EM.Entertainment GmbH and its programming library including its Australian animation production studio Flying Bark Productions, its German TV channel Junior and its classic catalogue for $100 million.

However on the 30th of that month following EM.Sport Media AG through their entertainment division EM.Entertainment GmbH's successful distribution partnership with Belgian production company Studio 100 via its German international distribution division Studio 100 Media three months before, EM.Sport Media AG announced that they have exited the children's entertainment and animation business and had sold their children's entertainment division EM.Entertainment GmBH alongside their Australian entertainment & animation studio Flying Bark Productions, their German television channel Junior and their distribution library including Yoram Gross' animated productions such as Blinky Bill, the library of Japanese animation studio Zuiyo and its classic catalogue such as Maya the Bee and Vic the Viking to Belgian children's production company Studio 100 for €41 million in order for EM.Sport Media to focus on their expanded sport activities with Studio 100 taking over EM.Entertainment's Australian entertainment & animation studio as their own Australian in-house animation studio outside of Belgium and had EM.Entertainment's library under the latter's own distribution arm Studio 100 Media with Studio 100 will launch new adaptations of the two classic shows.

In April 2009 following EM.Sport Media AG's merger with Swiss media giant Highlight Communications the parent company of German film distributor Constantin Film, EM.Sport Media AG announced their rebranding of its name to Constantin Medien AG which was named after Constantin Film to reflect its expansion of the group's activities.

On February 13, 2018, a takeover by Highlight Communications AG was completed. On September 26, 2019, the company was delisted from the Frankfurt Stock Exchange.

At the Annual General Meeting 2019, the change of name to Sport1 Medien AG was resolved. The change was entered in the Commercial Register of the City of Munich (HRB 148 760) on January 2, 2020, and thus became effective. The change of name is also accompanied by a change in the company's purpose, which was also resolved by the Annual General Meeting in July last year and is now more strongly aligned to the company's activities in the digital sector.

On February 23, 2024, Acun Medya acquired 50% of subsidiary Sport1 GmbH.

In July 2025, Sport1 Medien had diverst its sports production subsidiary Plazamedia to Stockholm-based Swedish cloud-media & live sports entertainment production company DMC Production & had it merged with RT1.TV Mobile Production, which DMC Production had brought the mobile external production unit RT1.TV Mobile Production from its former parent & electronic media of Mediengruppe Pressedruck, RT1.Media Group, on the first of that same month, to form DMC's newly-created in-house German production division DMC Production Germany.

== Assets ==
=== Current assets ===
- Sport1 (50%; co-owned with Acun Medya)

=== Former assets ===
==== Sold ====
- EM Interactive - sold to Victory Media Group; renamed to InteractiveMedia in 2001.
- Flying Bark Productions - sold to Studio 100 in 2008.
- The Jim Henson Company - sold back to the Henson family in May 2003.
- Junior - sold to Studio 100 in 2008.
- Junior.Publishing - sold to Egmont Group in November 2001; renamed to Egmont Publishing.
- Planeta Junior - 50% stake sold to De Agostini in August 2004.
- Plazamedia - sold to DCM Production in July 2025.
- Tele München Gruppe - sold back to Herbet Kloiber in December 2004.

== Shareholdings ==
The subsidiaries of Sport1 Medien AG include Sport1 GmbH, Magic Sports Media GmbH, Match IQ GmbH, PLAZAMEDIA GmbH and LEITMOTIF Creators GmbH. In December 2019, the Marketing Segment, which previously belonged to Sport1 Media GmbH, was also integrated under Sport1 GmbH.

Beyond the activities of Sport1, the Sport1 Medien AG corporate portfolio includes MAGIC SPORTS MEDIA as a marketing company in the betting, poker, casino and lottery sectors, Match IQ as the full-service sports event and consulting agency for associations, leagues and clubs for internationalization, match day management and the organization of friendly matches, tournaments, training camps and trips abroad, PLAZAMEDIA in the sports and entertainment area for media channels and LEITMOTIF as consulting unit for companies and brands. Within the scope of their business activities, these companies also continue to focus on third-party business.
