= Leonine Holding =

German media production and distribution company

Leonine Holding GmbH
- Formerly: Tele München Group (1970–2019)
- Type: Private
- Industry: Media
- Predecessors: Universum Film GmbH (1979–2019); Concorde Film/Filmverleih/Video/Home Entertainment (1980–2019)
- Founded: 27 April 1970; 56 years ago
- Founder: Walter Ulbrich
- Headquarters: Munich, Germany
- Key people: Fred Kogel (CEO); Markus Frerker (COO); Joachim Scheuenpflug (CFO); Bernhard zu Castell (chief distribution officer)
- Revenue: €286 million (2015)
- Operating income: €56 million (2015)
- Parent: Mediawan
- Divisions: Leonine Anime; Leonine Animation Studios; Leonine Audio; Leonine Documentaries; Leonine Distribution; Leonine Kids; Leonine Licensing; Leonine Production
- Subsidiaries: See § Units
- Website: leoninestudios.com

Leonine Holding GmbH, also known as LEONINE Studios and formerly known Tele München Group, LLC (German: Tele München Gruppe; TMG), is a German media production and distribution company that is based in Munich and since April 2024, it has been owned by Mediawan.

The activities of Leonine include trade in licenses, investments in television and radio stations and distribution and production of television films and movies.

Leonine Studios produced and distributed their feature films, international television series, entertainment & infotainment formats and social media content either in-house or to other studios for social media channels. Their own production labels included Odeon Fiction, Madame Zhang Production, SEO Entertainment, W&B Television and Wiedemann & Berg Film Production.

== History ==
=== Tele München Group ===
Former logo for Leonine Holding under Tele München Gruppe branding

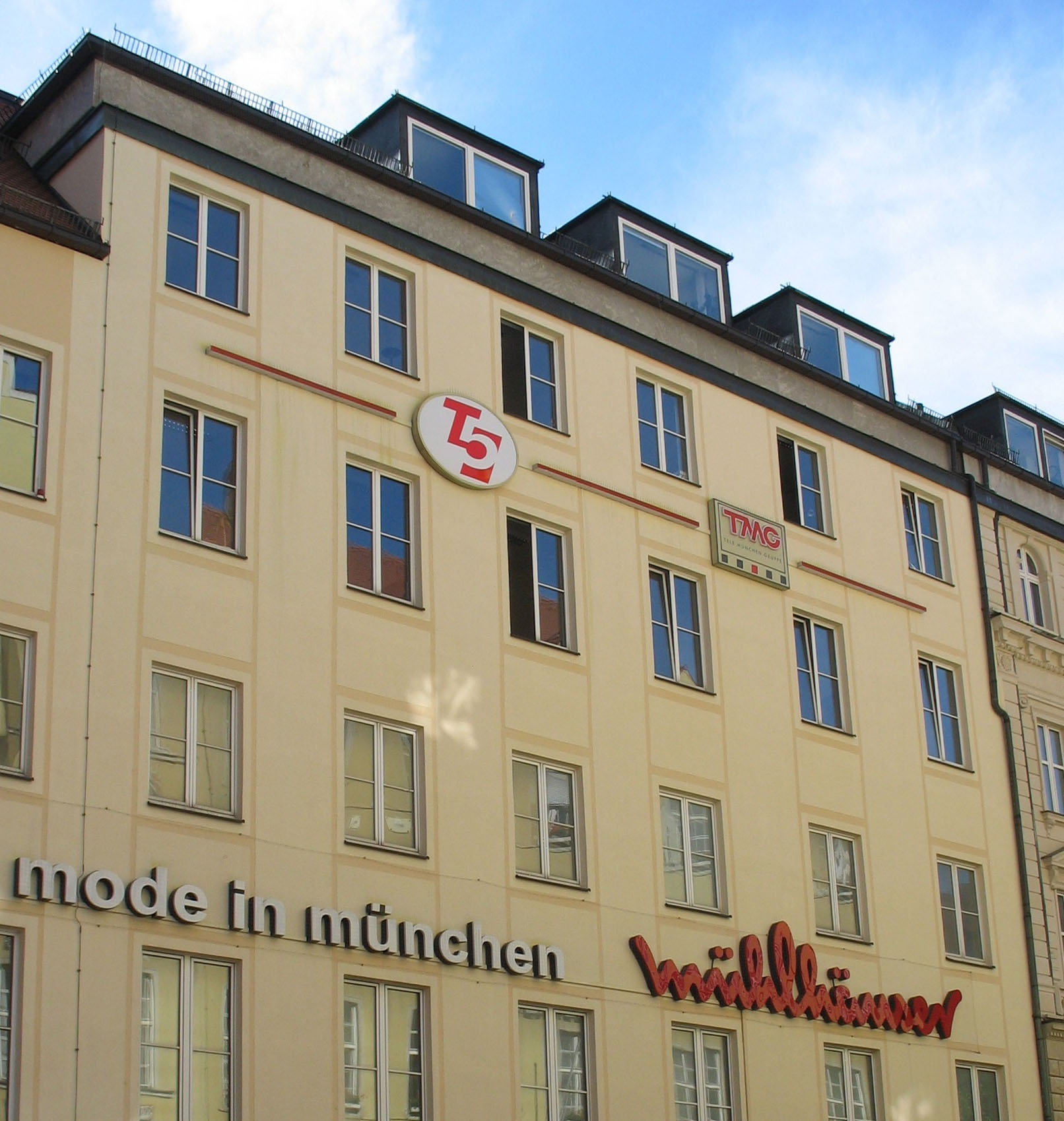
Headquarters of TMG in Munich

The Tele München GmbH was founded on April 27, 1970, by author and producer Walter Ulbrich in order to produce programming dedicated to events for German public television which they made their first production of Jack London's classic The Sea Wolf. It was purchased in 1977 by Herbert Kloiber and his business partner Fritz Buttenstedt. In 1980, the Tele München Group launched & founded their own theatrical distribution subsidiary and was named Concorde Filmverleih (Concorde film distribution) to distribute movies to German cinemas nationwide and a year later in 1981, the company acquired along with the cinema operator Hans-Joachim Flebbe several movie theaters in Hamburg, Berlin and Braunschweig.

TMG was partner at the television station Sat.1 in 1985; after a year, the company sold its shares and started the TV station musicbox. In the same year, TMG took over the Munich private radio station Radio Xanadu, which was later renamed to Radio Energy.

In 1987, Silvio Berlusconi’s company Fininvest acquired 50 percent of musicbox. This was the basis for the channel Tele 5. In 1988, Axel Springer Publishing House and CLT became partner at TMG. In 1989, 50 percent from the company were sold to Capital Cities / ABC.

1991 TMG sold its shares in Tele 5 to the Axel Springer Publishing House and in 1992 founded, together with CLT, Bertelsmann, Bauer Media Group and The Walt Disney Company, the TV channel RTL II. In 1995, the television station Tm3 was founded by TMG and the Bauer Media Group.

In 1996, Herbert Kloiber bought back the TMG shares from Capital Cities / ABC, and took over the shares of Bauer Media Group on Tm3. In 1997, TMG participated in the Hungarian private broadcaster TV2.

In 1998, Rupert Murdoch's company News Corporation took over 66 percent of Tm3 and two years later, in 2000, took over Tm3 completely.

In September 1999, Munich-based German entertainment company EM.TV & Merchandising AG announced they had taken a 49% majority stake in Tele München Group.

On 28 April 2002, the channel Tele 5 was restarted by TMG. TMG launched a streaming service, Filmtastic, in 2017.

In July 2011, Tele München Group announced that they brought 33% in German independent television production company Odeon Film AG. By November of that same year Tele Manchester Group announced that they increased their stake in Odeon Film by acquiring 40% of the company becoming TMG's biggest shareholder in Odeon Film AG.

=== Leonine Holdings ===
In February 2019, it was announced that New York-based American global investment firm Kohlberg Kravis Roberts (KKR) agreed to purchase German production & distribution group Tele München Group alongside their world sales division Tele München International and its film, television & home entertainment subsidiaries Concorde Filmverith, Concorde Home Entertainment, their 85% stake in German production company Odeon Film, its own production subsidiary Clasart Film- und Fernsehproduktions and their stakes in German television channels RTL II and Tele 5 from its previous owner Herbert G. Kloiber who had held the company since 1977, with expected closing in April 2019. At closing, Fred Kogel's appointment as CEO would be effective with Kloiber's son Herbert L. Kloiber continued serving Tele München's production subsidiaries. Four days later in that same month after KKR had acquired German production & distribution outfit Tele Munchen Group, KKR expanded their German operations by announcing that they've agreed to purchase leading German film production and distribution company Universum Film along with two SVOD channels from their local broadcasting company RTL Group and its German division Mediengruppe RTL Deutschland (now known as RTL Deutschland), with the intent to combine the two companies (Tele Muchen Group and Universum Film) into a new German-based entertainment production and distribution company with Bernhard zu Castell continued to lead the acquired company as their CEO.

In late-March 2019 one month after German film & television production and distribution company Tele München Group was brought by KKR along with leading German production & distribution company Universum Film, Tele München Group had been expanded when their new parent company KKR announced that they've acquired Cologne-based German entertainment television production company i&u TV and had it placed under KKR's expanded German film and television production operations as they were intending to merge TMG and Universum into create a German independent film and television production powerhouse that will include i&u TV with i&u TV's founder & top television presenter Günther Jauch continued to run the acquired company. One month later in April of that same year following KKR's, Tele München Group had been further expanded when their parent company KKR announced that they've acquired Munich-based German film production company Wiedemann & Berg Film. Wiedemann & Berg would continue its TV arm, W&B Television, as a joint venture with Endemol Shine Germany. Founders Max Wiedemann and Quirin Berg would continue as managing directors of Wiedemann & Berg while adding the position of head of the group's feature film production division.

In September 2019, the enlarged film & television, entertainment production & distribution powerhouse Tele Munchen Group announced that they're rebounding themselves with a new name which was called Leonine by their parent company KKR with three main divisions which are Distribution, Production, & Licensing. The distribution division, consisting of their four Munich-based German film distribution companies which were TMG's own distribution division Concorde Filmverleih including its home video distribution outfit Concorde Home Entertainment, TMG's worldwide sales distribution TM International and the acquired German production & distribution company Universum Film, as well the company's stakes in RTL II & Tele 5, would all be merged together and operated under Leonine's new distribution division named Leonine Distribution as of January 1, 2020. The production division, consisting of film & television production companies mainly i&u TV, Weidermann & Berg Film Production and Odeon Film, would be grouped under the division called Leonine Production, while continuing their separate identities. While under Leonine Distribution, RTL II, Tele 5, & the subscription video on demand services would continue under their current names. Two months later following the renaming of Tele Munchen Group to Leonine Holding, Leonine announced it had purchased the remaining share of Wiedermann & Berg Film's former German television division Wiedemann & Berg Television (W&B TV) from Dutch production & distribution group Endemol Shine Group, reuniting Wiedemann & Berg Film with their former television production division and became part of Leonine's division Leonine Production.

In July 2020, Leonine Holding announced that it had sold its German free-to-air entertainment channel Tele 5 to American multinational mass media broadcasting company Discovery Inc. (now Warner Bros. Discovery) under their German division Discovery Deutschland to focus on its growing production and distribution activities, with Discovery signing a long-term licensing deal with Leonine for its scripted content. Two months later, Leonine Holding announced that it had sold its German free-to-air entertainment channel Tele5 to American multinational mass media broadcasting company Discovery Inc., under Discovery Inc.'s German division Discovery Deutschland with the channel becoming part of Discovery's German activities.

In December 2020, Leonine Holding and their division Leonine Studios had announced that they've acquired Munich-based German light entertainment television production company SEO Entertainment and become part of Leonine's expanded portfolio with SEO Entertainment remained their position as an independent company under Leonine Studios's division Leonine Production whilst SEO Entertainment's managing director Gillad Osterer had been remained the managing director of SEO Entertainment and was being reported to Leonine's CEO Fred Kogel.

In July 2021, Leonine Holding along with French audiovisual production and distribution company Mediawan announced a rebranding of their joint venture production division to Mediawan & Leonine Studios and announced it had acquired a majority stake in British drama production company Drama Republic, marking Leonine Holding's first entry into the British television market and the English-language operations alongside Mediawan with Drama Republic founders & CEOs Greg Brenman and Roanna Benn continued leading Drama Republic.

In March 2022, Leonine Studios had announced that they're restructuring their German-based unscripted television production label by rebranding Odeon Entertainment to Madame Zheng Production with the rebranded company hiring former RedSeven Entertainment executive and co-head of entertainment at Leonine Studios Tina Wagner along with former Red Arrow Studios producer and co-head of entertainment at Leonine Nina Etspüler taking over as leadership of the rebranded company.

In May 2022, Leonine Holding announced that their division Leonine Studios had acquired Berlin-based independent entertainment outfit Hyperbole Median becoming part of Leonine's production division, thrust expanding Leonine's film and television production state with Hyperbole Median remaining as an independent production company under Leonine.

In October 2022, Leonine Holding announced that they had brought a 25% minority stake in Munich-based children's animation production and distribution studio Toon2Tango and placed it under their Leonine Studios division, the acquisition marks the first time Leonine entered the animation production industry and had given their own animation subsidiary with Leonine Studios adding development and production of animation IPs to their distribution division.

Since October 2023, Leonine started distributing home media releases from Walt Disney Studios Home Entertainment in Germany, Austria and Switzerland.

On December 18, 2023, Leonine Studios who had held a 25% minority stake in Munich-based animation production & distribution unit Toon2Tango one year prior and had previously distributed or produced animated series & films had announced that they're launching their own in-house animation production studio division named Leonine Animation Studios GmbH and announcing that they've taken full control of Munich animation producer and distributor Toon2Tango and becoming a wholly owned subsidiary of Leonine Animation Studios with Toon2Tango's founder and managing directors Hans Ulrich Stoef and Jo Daris helding Leonine's new animation production division and continued leading Toon2Tango through Leonine's animation division.

In March 2024, Leonine along with its division Leonine Studios announced that they've expanded its production division into the non-scripted genre and announced that they've launched a new documentaries production division named Leonine Documentaries with former Constantin Film executive Jochen Koestler became the president of the newly launched documentaries division.

In April 2024, it was announced that French media production & distribution conglomerate Mediawan, which already held a 25% minority stake in Munich-based German film & television production and distribution company Leonine since 2020 and also backed by KKR announced that they had entered an agreement to acquire the remaining stakes of Munich-based German film & television production and distribution company Leonine and their production companies by acquiring the remaining stakes in an all stock deal for an undisclosed sum. The deal of acquiring full control of Leonine Holding would expand Mediawan into the German production & distribution operations and would turn Mediawan into a pan-European film and television production and distribution powerhouse with pending subject to be approved from German authorities while Leonine will retaining their name once the acquisition is completed alongside its founder Fred Kogel who will join Mediawan's executive team and will continue to head up Leonine's operations.

== Units ==
- Leonine Licensing

=== Leonine Distribution ===
Leonine Distribution is Leonine Studios' film production division that its based in Munich where its parent company is based and was formed when Concorde Filmverleih (which was founded in 1980) was merged into the acquired German production & distribution company Universum Film and rebranded under its current name.

They acquires film and television series rights for the international markets including their home country of Germany and released them for cinemas and home entertainment.

==== Divisions ====
- TM Distribution
- TM International
- Concorde (Munich) film company
- Concorde Home Entertainment (Munich)
- Universum Film movie distribution (former division of UFA GmbH subsidiary of RTL Group)

==== Broadcasting ====
- RTL Zwei (Munich, 31.5%)

Leonine Holding formerly owned Tele 5 channel, which, since September 2020, is a subsidiary of Warner Bros. Discovery.

==== Subscription video on demand channels ====
- Filmtastic
- Home of Horror
- Arthouse CNM

==== Filmography ====
Title	Release date	Distributor	Notes
Maya the Bee	2014	Universum Film (Germany); StudioCanal (Australia)	also known as Maya the Bee Movie co-production with Studio 100 Film, Flying Bark Productions, Screen Australia, ZDF and Buzz Studios
Maya the Bee: The Honey Games	1 April 2018; 26 July 2018 (Australia)	Universum Film (Germany); StudioCanal (Australia)	Sequel to Maya the Bee Movie co-production with Studio 100 Film, Flying Bark Productions, Screen Australia, Buzz Studios and Fish Blowing Bubbles
Princess Emmy	28 March 2019; 30 August 2019 (United Kingdom)	Universum Film; Kaledeoscope Film Distribution (United Kingdom)	co-production with Studio 100 Film, Studio 100 Media, Witebox, Talking Horse, Animation Fabrik and Red Kite Animation
Vic the Viking and the Magic Sword	18 December 2019 (France); 2 September 2021 (Germany)	Leonine Distribution; SND Films (France)	co-production with Studio 100 Film, Studio 100 Animation, Studio 100 Media, Belvision, SND Films and ZDF
Yakari, A Spectacular Journey	August 12, 2020	Leonine Distribution; BAC Films (France)	co-production with Leonine Production, Dargaud Media, Dupuis Edition & Audiovisuel, Belvision, Le Lombard, BAC Film Production, WunderWerk, Gao Shang Pictures, WDR and France 3 Cinema

=== Leonine Production ===
- Clasart Film (Munich)
- Clasart Television
- Clasart Classic
- Odeon Film (85.23%)
  - Odeon Fiction - fictional content for television, cinema and streaming platforms
- Madame Zheng Productions - reality entertainment, documentaries, and live broadcasts
- i&u TV (April 2019—)
- Mediawan & Leonine Studios (joint venture with Mediawan)
  - Drama Republic (51%)
- SEO Entertainment
- Wiedemann & Berg Film Production (April 2019—)
  - W&B Television

=== Other interests ===
- Load Studios - digital media
- Storied Media Group, media project development and packaging

=== Leonine Animation Studios ===
Leonine Animation Studios is the animation production division of Leonine Studios that handled Leonine's animation production output. It was founded in December 2023 by Toon2Tango managing directors and former m4e and Studio 100 Media CEOs Hans Ulrich Stoef and Jo Daris.

==== Toon2Tango ====
Toon2Tango is a Munich-based German animation and kids & family production company that is a subsidiary of German production & distribution group Leonine Holding through its animation division Leonine Animation Studios. It was established in July 2019 by former Made 4 Entertainment (m4e) co-founder and Studio 100 Media CEO Hans Ulrich Stoef.

Two months later in September of that year following its founding, Toon2Tango appointed former Made 4 Entertainment (m4e) and Studio 100 CCO Jo Daris as their CCO.

In March 2025 one year after Toon2Tango's parent Leonine Studios merged with French media production & distribution company Mediawan back in April 2024, Toon2Tango alongside Leonine Animation Studios' parent Leonine Studios announced that they've joined forces with Mediawan's kids & family production division Mediawan Kids & Family (which owns French animation studio Method Animation) to interrogate the distribution of Toon2Tango's content portfolio into Mediawan Kids & Family's own distribution division Mediawan Kids & Family Distribution with Toon2Tango's future productions will now be distributed under Mediawan Kids & Family distribution services as Toon2Tango became Mediawan Kids & Family's German animation production subsidiary.

===== Filmography =====
Title	Years	Network	Notes
Monster Loving Maniacs	2023–present	Super RTL; Nickelodeon Italy; DR (Denmark); SVT (Sweden); NRK (Norway); Ketnet (Belgium)	co-production with Mondo TV, Belvision, Ja Film and Ginger Pictures; Co-distributed with Mondo TV and Mediawan Kids & Family Distribution since 2025
Grisù	2023–present	Kika; Rai Yoyo & Rai Play (Italy)	co-production with Mondo TV, Mondo TV France and ZDF Studios
Agent 203	2024–present	Super RTL; Rai Gulp (Italy)	co-production with Mondo TV, V House Animation and Cosmos Maya; Co-distributed with Mondo TV and Mediawan Kids & Family Distribution since 2025
Littlest Robot	TBA	TBA	co-production with Method Animation and V House Animation
Eldrador	TBA	TBA	co-production with Method Animation and Schleich

== See also ==
- ATV (Austria)
- Bauer Media Group
- Bertelsmann
- Tm3
- TV2
