= Junior (German TV channel) =

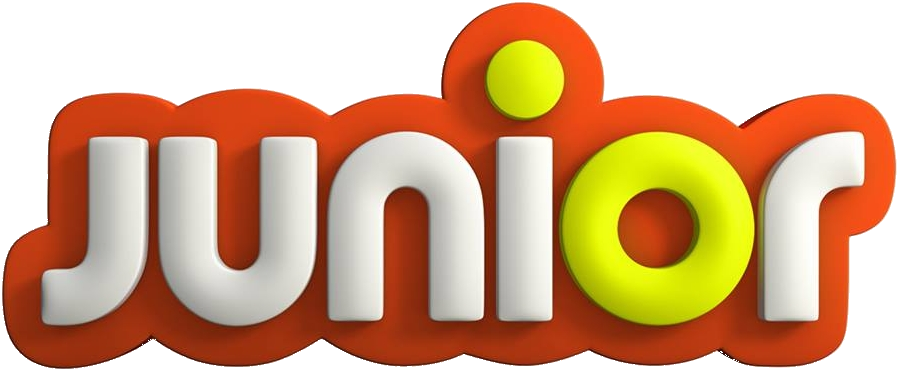
- Final logo, used from 2015 to 2022
- Country: Germany
- Broadcast area: Germany; Austria; Switzerland; Luxembourg

Programming
- Picture format: 16:9

Ownership
- Owner: EM.TV (1996–2008); Studio 100 (2008–2022)

History
- Launched: 28 July 1996
- Closed: 31 December 2022
- Former names: Junior TV Germany

Links
- Website: junior.tv

Junior was a German preschool TV channel which was on air from 1996 to 2022, aimed at children between 3 and 7 years of age. The channel formerly timeshared with Junior includes K-Toon [de] and aired an anime programming block called Junior XL between 2003 and 2007 (both of which were for older children aged 8 to 13).

The channel closed on 31 December 2022.
