= Plopsaqua =

Belgian waterpark chain

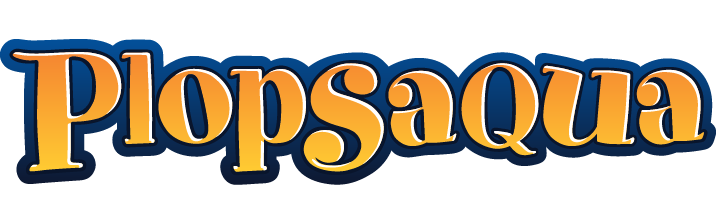
Logo

Plopsaqua is a chain of waterparks in Belgium, owned and operated by Plopsa. It currently consists of two waterparks: Plopsaqua Hannut-Landen in Hannut, Liège in the French-speaking Wallonia which opened in 2021, and Plopsaqua De Panne, which is part of the Plopsaland De Panne complex in De Panne, West Flanders in the Dutch-speaking Flanders, which opened in 2015.

== Plopsaqua De Panne ==
Plopsaqua De Panne
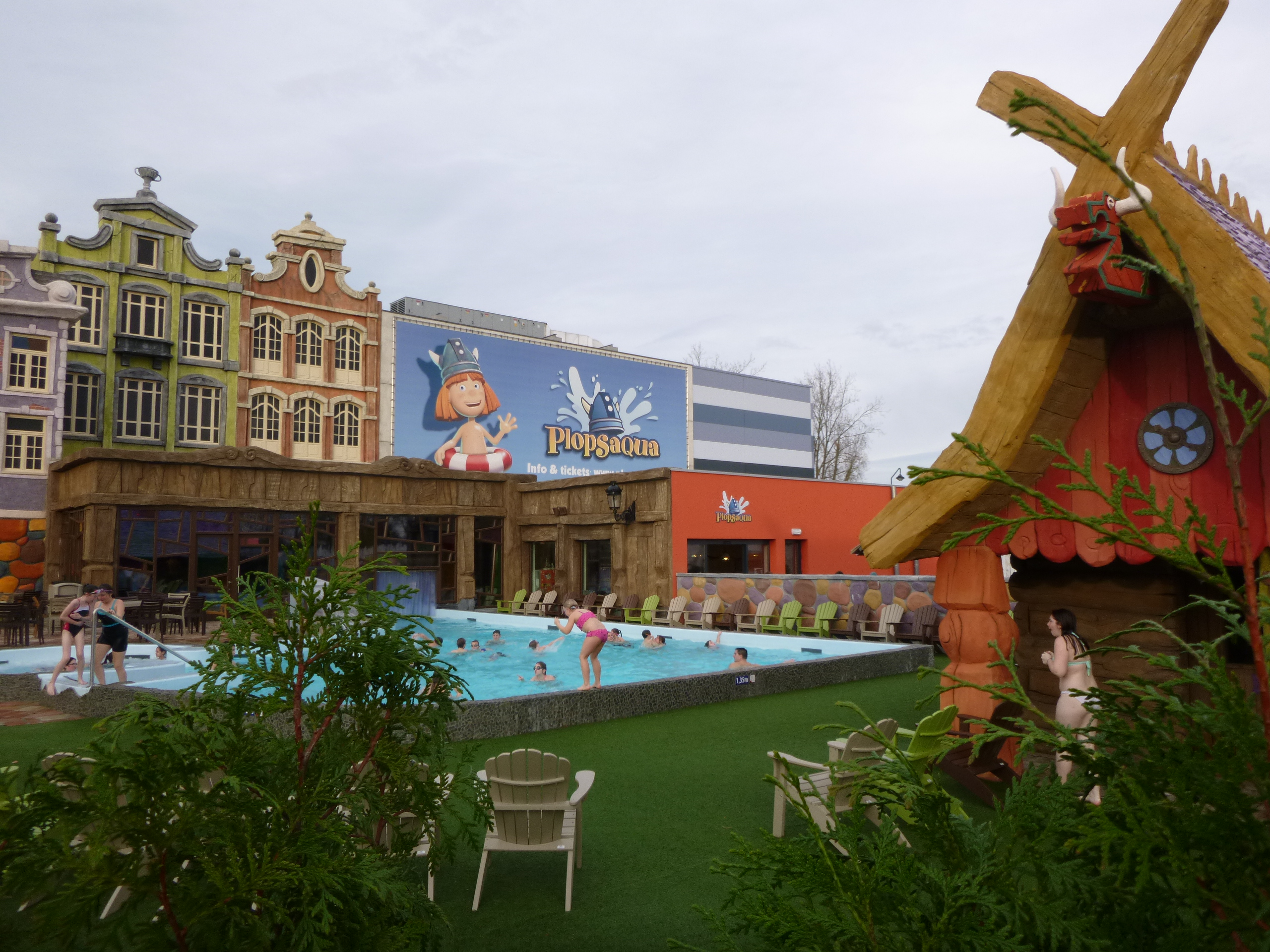
- Location: De Panne, Belgium
- Opened: March 22, 2015; 11 years ago
- Owner: Plopsa
- Theme: Vic the Viking

At the beginning of the 2010s, Plopsa was looking into turning its flagship park Plopsaland into an all-weather-resort. They wanted to reach this goal by opening an indoor themepark, theatre, hotel and waterpark. Around the same time the municipality of De Panne was looking to replace their municipal swimming pool. Both parties decided to merge their plans, in which Plopsa would build, own and operate the facility and the municipality would pay Plopsa €750,000 each year for a period of 20 years in exchange for which the municipality could use the facility and residents would pay a reduced price.

In July 2012 Plopsa filed their permit, which was granted in October of that same year. The construction started in October 2013 and the facility was opened during the 15th anniversary of the resort in March 2015.

== Plopsaqua Hannut-Landen ==
Plopsaqua Hannut-Landen
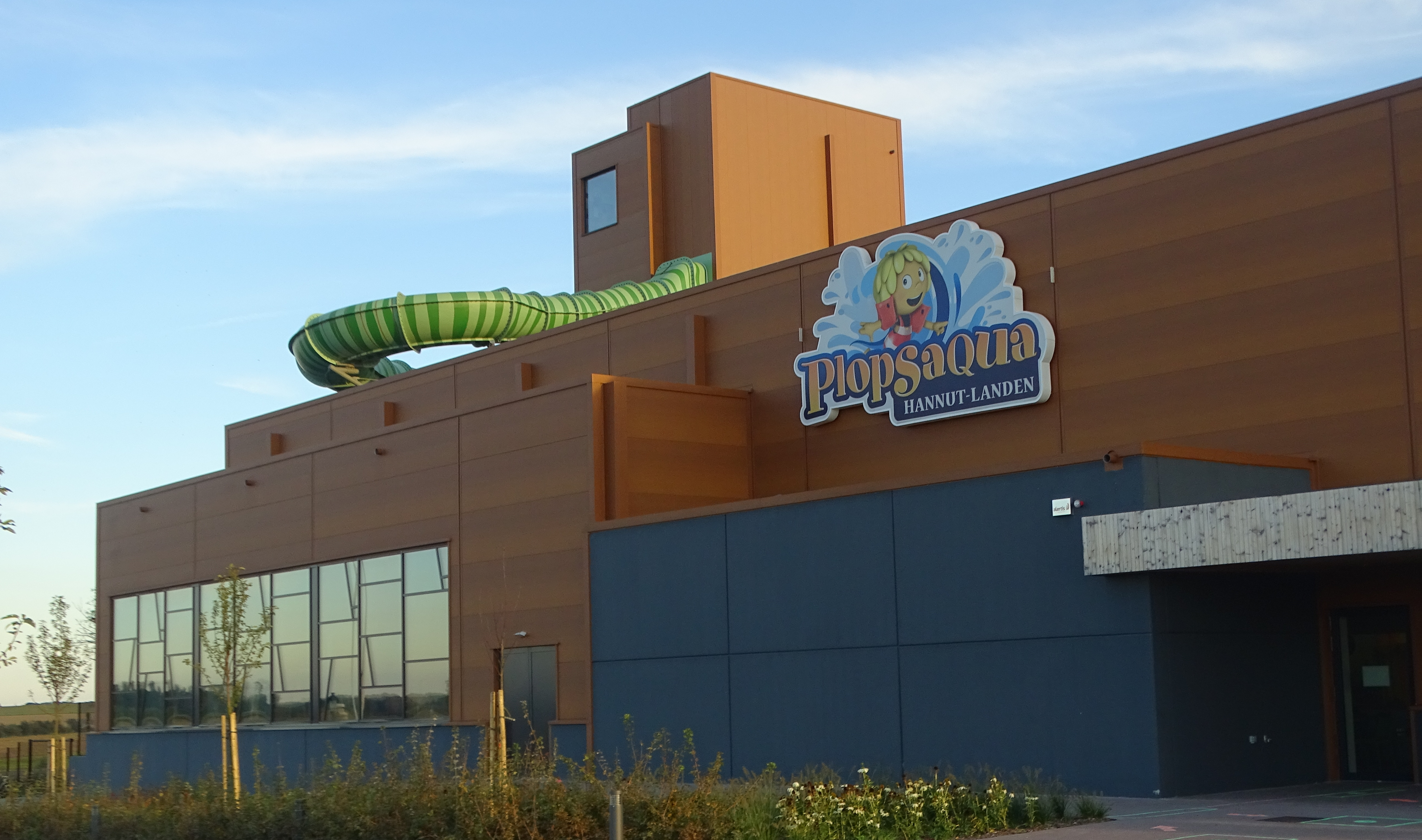
- Location: Hannut, Belgium
- Opened: Sports pool December 11, 2020; 5 years ago Waterpark; June 9, 2021; 5 years ago
- Owner: Plopsa
- Theme: Maya the Bee and Bumba

After the opening of Plopsaqua De Panne, Plopsa started looking at other locations in Belgium for waterparks that could also function as a municipal swimming pool. Around the same period the Hannut and Landen municipalities were looking for a solution for their outdated municipal swimming pools. After a tendering procedure Plopsa was awarded the concession in 2017, with a location in Hannut at the language border with Flanders. The project would cost €22.5 million and the municipalities would each contribute €480,000 each year for a period of 25 years.

In 2018 Plopsa submitted the permit application, which had to be adjusted on a number of points - such as the color of the slides and the exterior - in order to fit better into the environment. The province approved the plans in February 2019 and construction started in May of the same year. The waterpark is themed after Maya the Bee and Bumba, but the municipal pool has a neutral appearance.

The opening of the waterpark was scheduled for December 5 of 2020, however the COVID-19 figures were not positive enough, so the Belgian federal government could not give permission to attraction- and waterparks to reopen. However, sports pools were given an exception and these were allowed to reopen with measures. Plopsa decided to open the Plopsaqua Landen-Hannut sports pool on 11 December 2020. The rest of the waterpark followed on 9 June 2021.

== Future ==
=== Plopsaqua Haßloch ===
In Germany the group is looking for a waterpark next to their Holiday Park, for this project Plopsa also wanted to participate with the local authorities. Several proposals were given, but were cancelled in a referendum. In an interview Steve Van den Kerkhof (CEO Plopsa) announced that they would build the waterpark with or without funding from the municipality. In December 2021 Plopsa officially announced the creation of the waterpark, that would consist of a 4,000 m^{2} indoor themed area with a wave pool, a white water river, a water playground, slides, a sports pool and an outdoor area. This plan was abandoned in December 2023 when Plopsa reached an agreement with the municipality of Haßloch. The group will replace the outdated municipal swimming pool and create new themed facilities on the same site.

=== Waterpark Warsaw ===
In June 2022 it was announced that a waterpark is to be constructed next to the indoor theme park Majaland Warsaw by Plopsa and Momentum Capital, the owners and operators of aforementioned theme park. The waterpark will be owned for 21% by Plopsa and 79% by Momentum Capital.

== Cancelled ==
=== Plopsaqua Den Haag ===
During a corruption investigation to a city official of The Hague in 2019 it was discovered that Plopsa was actively searching for a new site in The Netherlands to expand with a Plopsaqua and a possible second Plopsa Indoor. During an interview with RTL Nieuws Steve Van den Kerkhof confirmed this and that Plopsa was in talks with the city of The Hague, but that they were also investigating other sites in The Netherlands. The company also registered the URL. In August 2022 it was announced that the waterpark has been cancelled by Plopsa.

=== Plopsaqua Pulderbos ===
In 2020 the mayor of Zandhoven Luc Van Hove announced that he was in contact with Plopsa for a Plopsaqua facility, this to the dismay of the city council. The mayors of Zandhoven and Zoersel had meetings with Plopsa before the start of a tendering procedure in which a binding offer was made, once the tendering procedure was started the requirements were almost identical to the offer of Plopsa. All meetings and the binding offer were kept in the dark from the city councils, an opposition party started a petition to stop the new facility in 2021. In June 2023 the former swimming facility closed permanently and it was announced that there weren't any plans for its replacement.

=== Plopsaqua Mechelen ===
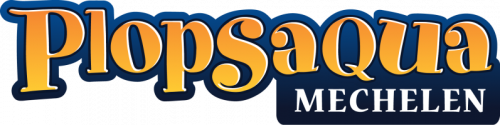
Logo of Plopsaqua Mechelen

The city of Mechelen and Plopsa started investigating Plopsaqua Mechelen in 2015. Several locations throughout the city were looked at, but the consortium picked a spot behind Technopolis. Plopsa submitted a permit application in February 2022 with a planned opening at the end of 2024 or the beginning of 2025, pending on the approval time. The facility, which shall be called Plopsaqua Mechelen Zennebad, shall consist of several slides, a wave pool, two sports pools, an outdoor pool and an instruction pool. The wave pool shall be themed to Kabouter Plop, Samson and Bumba, the public facilities will get a neutral theme. In September 2022 Plopsa withdrew its permit application after two negative remarks of the Provincial Environmental Licensing Committee. The company stated that it still commits to the project, but that several changes are being worked on. The city of Mechelen issued a permit for the complex to Plopsa in June 2024, with an estimated opening in 2026. In december 2024 Plopsa announced that they have cancelled the project, due to legal uncertainty and a changed economic context.
