= Expedition GeForce =

Rollercoaster in Germany

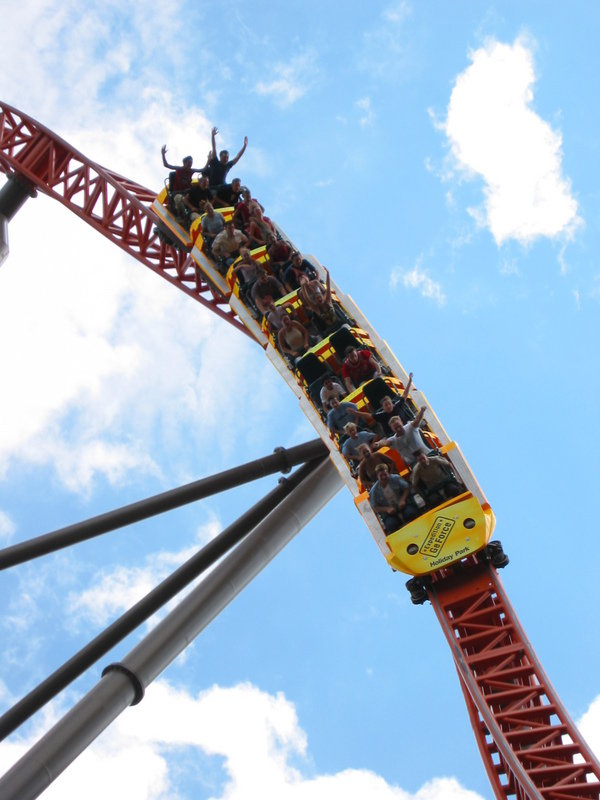

Plopsaland Deutschland
- Location: Plopsaland Deutschland
- Coordinates: 49.320°N 8.295°E
- Status: Operating
- Opening date: June 18, 2001

General statistics
- Type: Steel
- Manufacturer: Intamin
- Designer: Werner Stengel
- Model: Mega Coaster
- Lift/launch system: Cable lift hill
- Height: 174 ft (53 m)
- Drop: 168 ft (51 m)
- Length: 4,002.7 ft (1,220.0 m)
- Speed: 74.6 mph (120.1 km/h)
- Inversions: 0
- Duration: 1:15
- Max vertical angle: 82°
- Capacity: 1300 riders per hour
- G-force: 4.5
- Height restriction: 55 in (140 cm)
- Expedition GeForce at RCDB

Expedition GeForce is a steel roller coaster located at Plopsaland Deutschland in Haßloch, Germany. It is one of the largest roller coasters in Europe and has an 82 degree first drop. The trains travel up to 120 kilometres per hour (75 mph) through a course 1.2 kilometres (0.75 mi) long with seven periods of weightlessness. At its highest, the ride reaches 53 metres (174 ft) above ground.

Until the opening of Silver Star at Europa-Park, it was the tallest roller coaster operating on the European mainland.

== Ride information ==
The ride opened on June 18, 2001 to celebrate the 30-year anniversary of Plopsaland Deutschland's operation, costing approximately €10 million. It has a maximum throughput of 1,300 riders per hour, with two 28-seater trains in operation. The track rests on 209 foundations, which are up to 20 metres deep.

It was constructed by Swiss manufacturers Intamin, which markets this type of coaster as Mega Coaster, in collaboration with German engineer Werner Stengel. Unlike many other coasters, the ride does not employ a conventional chain lift but a faster cable lift with a catch car, very similar to the system used for Millennium Force. It is one of the prebuilt rides in RollerCoaster Tycoon 3 and NoLimits.

== Ride layout ==
From the station, the trains ascend the 174-foot (53 m) lift hill and encounter the first drop, which at 82°, makes a 74° right-hand turn. The ride continues with several large hills, which give a sensation of air-time, especially in the rear of the trains, and a number of overbanked turns, before becoming more twisted as the ride runs through woods and over a lake. Just before entering the brake run, the trains negotiate a series of bunny hops, again giving riders considerable amounts of air-time.

== Vehicles ==
The coaster has two trains of seven cars each. Each car seats two across in two rows. The trains are stainless steel with stadium-style seating. Each seat has an individual lap bar in addition to a seatbelt.

== Incident ==
On April 28, 2010 a train full of passengers came to a sudden stop when one of the cars derailed just after completing the ride's first drop. Firefighters evacuated all riders. None were seriously injured.

== Rankings ==
Golden Ticket Awards: Top steel Roller Coasters
Year									1998	1999
Ranking									–	–
Year	2000	2001	2002	2003	2004	2005	2006	2007	2008	2009
Ranking	–	–	8	3	4	6	6	6	5	6
Year	2010	2011	2012	2013	2014	2015	2016	2017	2018	2019
Ranking	6	7	6	3	3	3	4	5	4	5
Year	2020	2021	2022	2023	2024	2025	2026			
Ranking	N/A	6	6	6	9	10	14			
