= Plopsaland Deutschland =

Amusement park in Haßloch, Rhineland-Palatinate, Germany

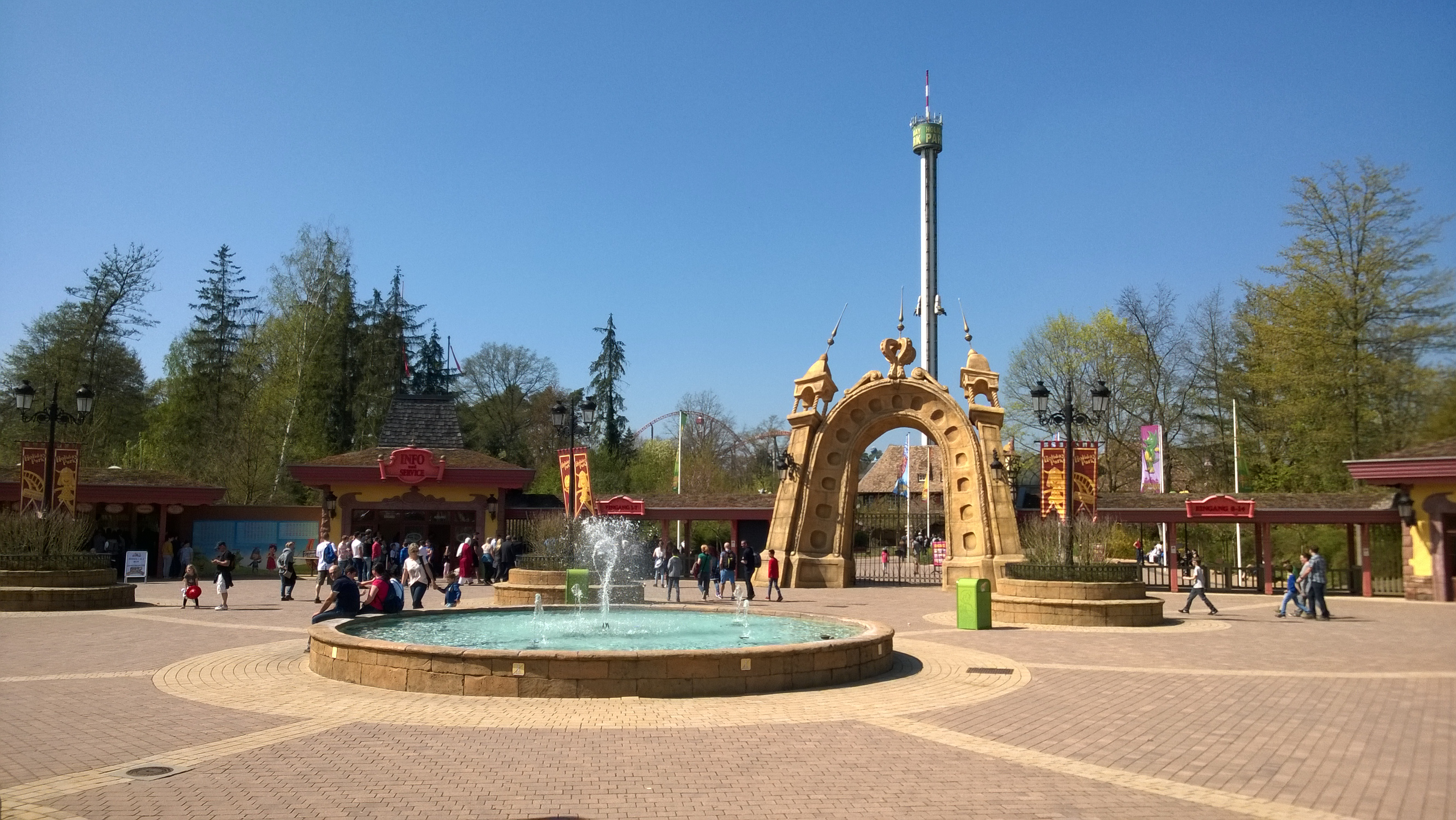
- Entrance of Plopsaland Deutschland
- Interactive map of Plopsaland Deutschland
- Location: Haßloch, Rhineland-Palatinate, Germany
- Coordinates: 49°19′11″N 8°17′41″E
- Opened: 1971
- Owner: Plopsa
- Area: 40 ha (99 acres)

Attractions
- Total: 38
- Roller coasters: 4
- Water rides: 5
- Website: Official website

Plopsaland Deutschland, Haßloch

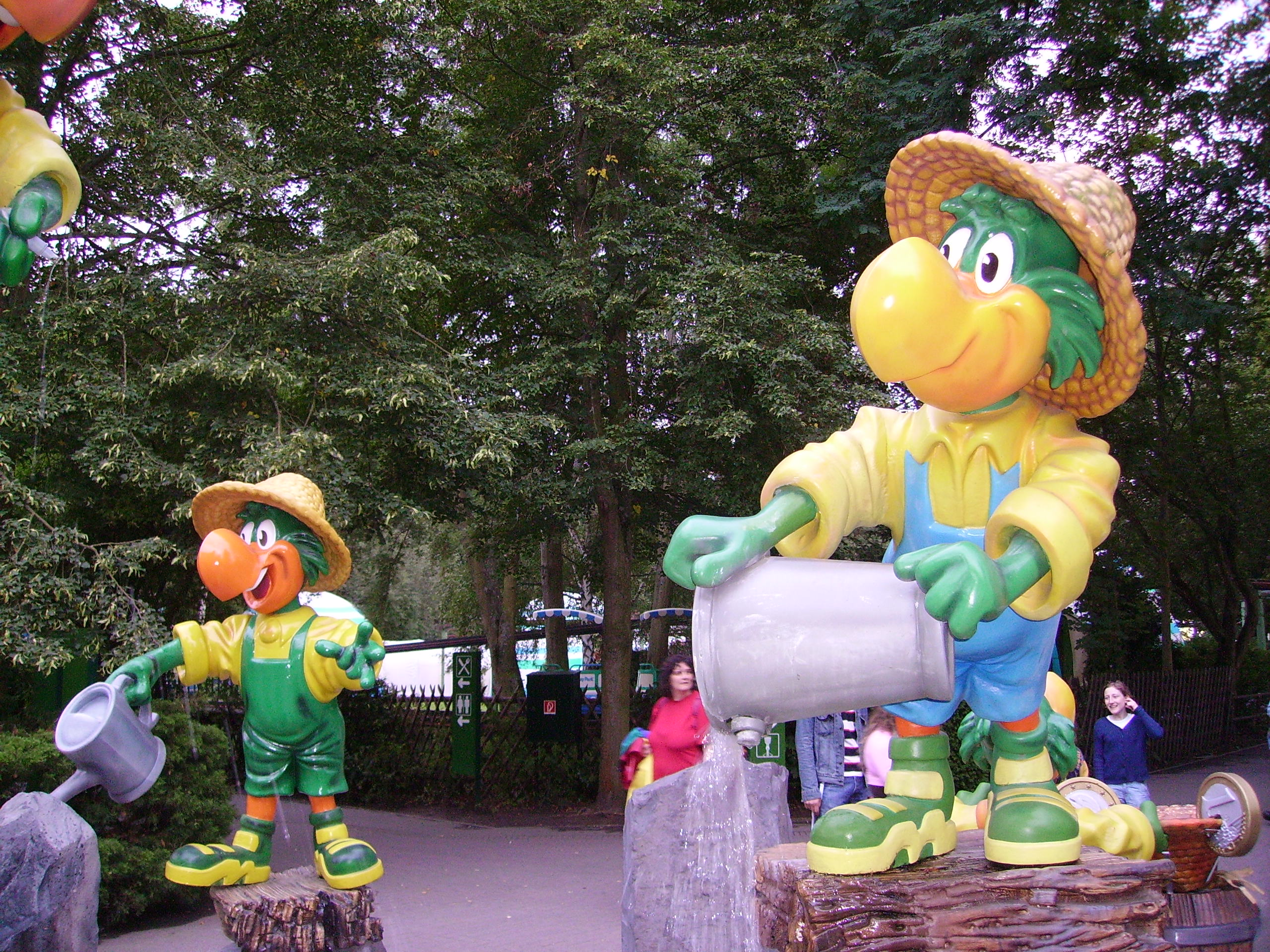
Holly the Parrot – former park mascot

Plopsaland Deutschland, formerly known as Holiday Park, is an amusement park in Haßloch, Germany, owned and operated by Plopsa. It is one of Germany's most popular theme parks (receiving about 660,000 visitors per year) and is part park and part woodland.

== History ==
=== Family Schneider ===
In 1970 the Schneider family bought the Märchenwald Haßloch, a fairytale forest. The family had a Liliputan Circus for several generations, where people could watch other people with dwarfism. The purchase allowed the family to give the circus a permanent place and the renewed park opened in 1971 with the Liliputaner town, a dolphin show, a Wild Mouse rollercoaster and a fairytale village. The park was renamed Holiday Park in 1973. Initially the park covered 70,000 m^{2}, but nowadays it has grown to 400,000 m^{2}. The park grew – over the decades that it was run by the Schneider family – to become the seventh largest amusement park in Germany. Under the family's leadership Germany's first Rapid River and Free Fall Tower opened. In the autumn of 1996 the Liliputaner town closed.

=== Plopsa ===
In November 2010 Plopsa announced that it would take over Holiday Park. After the takeover of the park various characters from E.M. Entertainment – such as Maya the Bee, Tabaluga and Vic the Viking – were introduced, E.M. Entertainment has been part of Studio 100 since 2008. With the arrival of the Studio 100 characters in 2011 the old park mascot Holly the Parrot gradually disappeared from the park, however he made a comeback in 2016 at the 45th anniversary of the park. With the acquisition Plopsa announced that it would invest €25 million in the park over a period of 4 years. The park received a renewed entrance in 2011, an outdoor Majaland with restaurant in 2012/2013, the Sky Scream rollercoaster from Premier Rides and a re-theming of the Teufelsfässer to Vic the Vicking in 2014 and Sky Fly in 2015.

In 2018 the park opened Holiday Indoor – a hall with a theater and 7 attractions – themed after Heidi, Tabaluga and Mia & Me at a total cost of €10 million. In 2019 Plopsa announced that they were investing another €25 million in Holiday Park over a period of 5 years, with the investment they want to transform the park into a multi-day destination with more than 1 million visitors per year. Part of that plan was to transform the Rapid River into Dino Splash in 2020 and built a Viking village with a Splash Battle & Disk'o Coaster in 2021.

On 28 June 2025, after 53 years of operation, the park was renamed to Plopsaland Deutschland.

== Future ==
As part of a 5-year plan to transform the park into a multi-day resort Plopsa will invest €65 million by 2025. Within the park they will open a 2500m^{2} water-playground in 2023, adjacent to the themed area The Beach. The playground will be copied from Plopsa's Majaland Kownaty in Poland, with a cost of €3,5 million. The ski stunt show will be replaced in 2024 by a Tomorrowland themed area, similar to Plopsaland in Belgium, with an investment of €15 million.

Adjacent to the entrance of the park a hotel with 350 beds shall be constructed in 2024, with a total cost of €20 million. The transformation into a multi-day resort shall be completed in 2025 with the opening of a Plopsaqua water park. Initially the group approached the municipality of Haßloch to construct the water park together, similar to their water parks in Belgium. However, the proposal was voted down by the population in a referendum. Plopsa then submitted an amended proposal, but this plan could not count on a majority as well. In an interview with Plopsa Fans, Steve van der Kerkhof (CEO Plopsa) indicated that he still had the desire for a water park, but that at that time the group was focusing on the indoor park that opened in 2018. It was announced by the company in December 2021 that they will open the water park on their own in 2025.

== Attractions ==
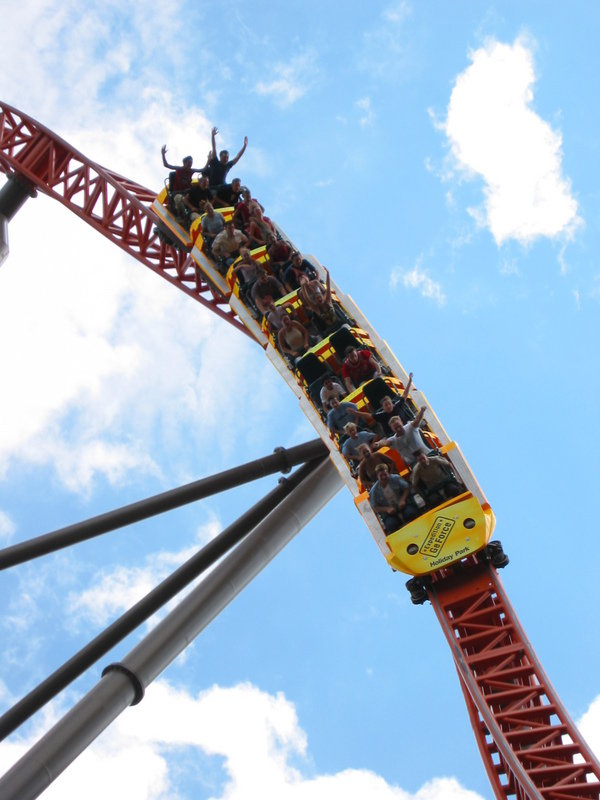
Expedition GeForce

=== Roller coasters ===
- 100% Wolf
- Expedition GeForce
- Sky Scream
- Tabalugas Achterbahn

=== Water rides ===
- Dinosplash (until 2020 called "Donnerfluss")
- Tanzenden Fontänen
- Rieseneimer
- Tulpen-Splash
- Plitsch-Platsch
- Wickie Splash

=== Thrill rides ===
- Annubis Free Fall Tower, Intamin Drop Tower
- Lighthouse tower, Funtime Skyflyer
- Majas Blumenturm, Flying Carousel
- Verrückter Baum, Zamperla Rockin' Tug
- Sky Fly, Gerstlauer Sky Fly
- Die große Welle, Zamperla Disk'o Coaster

=== Family rides ===
- Antikes Pferdekarussell
- Bienchenwirbel
- Laras Marienkäferflug
- Schmetterlingsflug
- Willies Flossfahrt
- Splash Battle

=== Child rides ===
- Flip der Grashüpfer
- Die Frösche

=== Former Rides ===
- Bounty Tower, Huss Condor (closed in 2014)
- Spinning Barrels, Huss Breakdance (closed in 2014)
- Sturmschiff, Huss Pirate Ship (closed in 2020)
- Wellenhopser (closed in 2020)
- Tabalugas Abenteuer (closed in 2017)
- Holly’s Fahrschule, bumper cars (closed in 2019)
- Tour des Fleurs, Monorail (closed in 2010)
- City Jet, flying carousel (closed in 2011)
- Burg Falkenstein (closed in 2022)

== Trivia ==
- Plopsa made a bid for the Air Force One to place it in Holiday Park. However, the offer was rejected as the plane was not allowed to leave the United States.
- The BigFM Expedition GeForce rollercoaster has received multiple awards, including the Golden Ticket Award for best roller coaster in Europe from Amusement Today magazine and several times the title of best rollercoaster in the world via Internet Coaster Poll.
