= Plopsa =

Theme park division of Studio 100

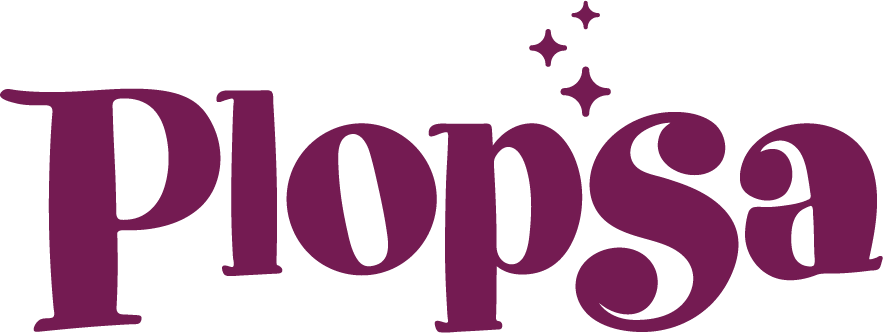

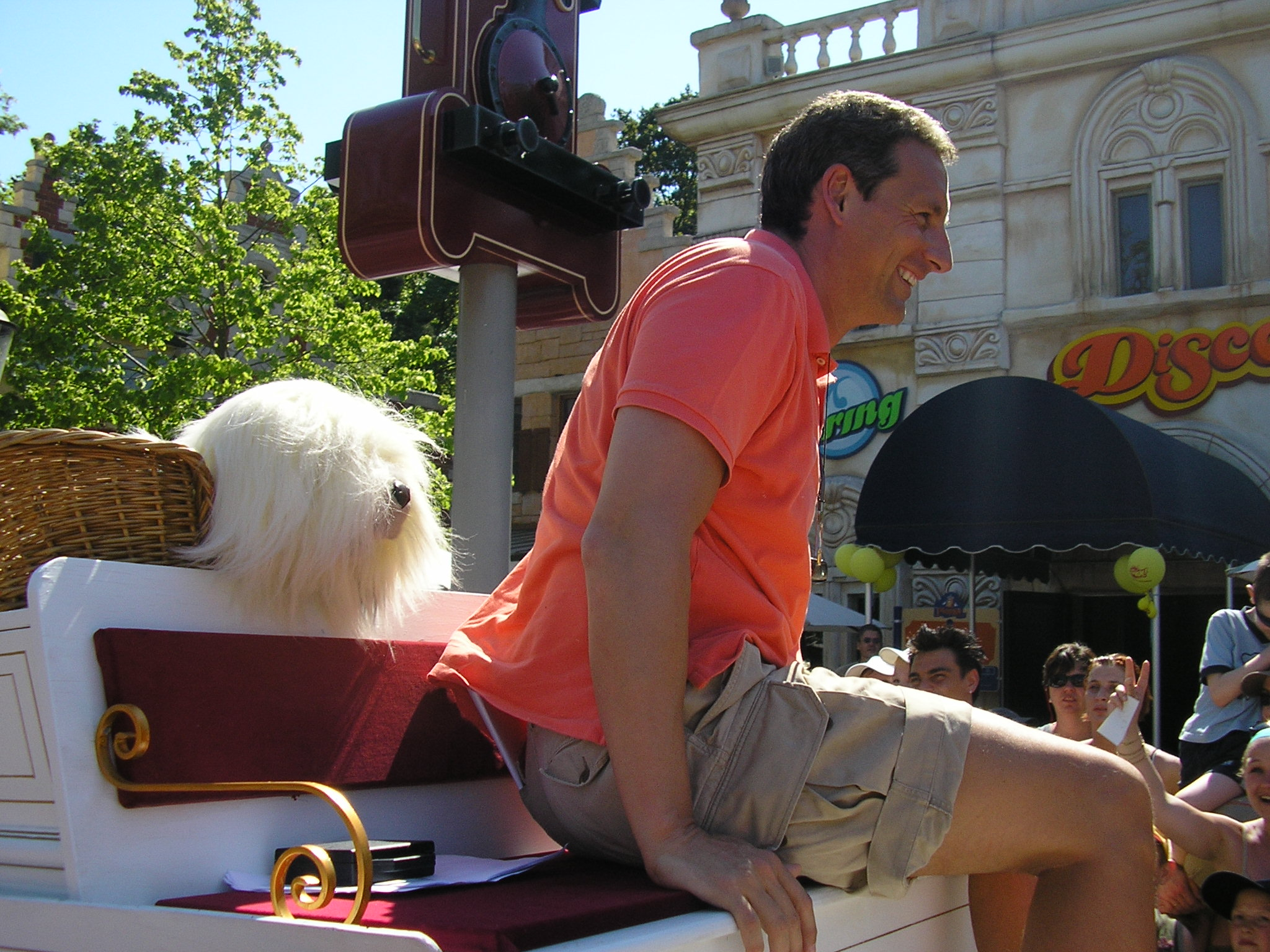
- Gert Verhulst as Gert in Plopsaland.
- Industry: Amusement parks
- Founded: 28 April 2000; 26 years ago
- Founder: Studio 100
- Headquarters: De Panne, Belgium
- Key people: Gert Verhulst, Founder and partial owner Hans Bourlon, Founder and partial owner Koen Clement; CEO
- Owner: Studio 100
- Website: Official website

Plopsa is the theme park division of Studio 100, which operates 8 parks across Belgium, The Netherlands, Germany and Poland.

== History ==
Plopsa began operation at the end of 1999 when Studio 100 acquired Meli Park in Adinkerke. After several renovations the park reopened as Plopsaland on 29 April 2000. Several attractions got a layover with Studio 100 characters, such as Kabouter Plop, Samson & Gert and Bumba.

In December 2005 the company opened a new indoor theme park in the Municipality Hasselt, Plopsa Indoor Hasselt. This marked the opening of the first indoor theme park in Belgium. In the same year Plopsa also acquired Télécoo, an amusement park near the waterfalls of Coo. As with Meli Park, several attractions got an overlay with Studio 100 characters. In July 2007 the park was renamed Plopsa Coo.

In 2010 Plopsa crossed the Dutch and German borders and opened an indoor theme park in Coevorden, similar to Plopsa Indoor Hasselt. The park officially opened its doors on 29 April 2010 as Plopsa Indoor Coevorden. In Germany, Plopsa acquired Holiday Park in Haßloch. As with Meli Park and Télécoo, the park got a layover with Studio 100 characters; The name, however, remained the same.

In 2015 the company enterend a new ares of park entertainment with the opening of Plopsaqua in De Panne, a water park themed around the Studio 100 character Vic the Viking. This park also received a subsidy from the Municipality, so the people of De Panne could use the facilities at a discount. Other Plopsaqua water parks are in active development throughout Belgium. The same year Studio 100/Plopsa opened their catalog of characters to other amusement park operators outside Belgium, The Netherlands, Germany, France and the United Kingdom. Majaland Kownaty, Poland and a yet to be built theme park in Prague, Czech Republic are examples of this, since these parks are partially owned by an investment company. Steve van den Kerkhof (CEO of Plopsa) stated that there is also interest in the characters from companies in China, The US, Australia and Canada

The latest location opened in Torzym, Poland in September 2018 with Majaland Kownaty. Majaland Kownaty is an indoor theme park similar to Plopsaland Coevorden in The Netherlands. The title character is Maya the Bee. In contrary to the other 6 parks this park is partially owned by an investment company. The theme park is doing so well that Plopsa and Momentum Capital decided to build three other parks in Poland in Warsaw, Gdańsk and Katowice.

At the end of 2019 Plopsa acquired the struggling theme park Comic Station, located in a terminal of Antwerp Central Station. The park closed for a partial refurbishment and opened in October 2021 as Plopsa Station Antwerp.

During the summer of 2025 the group renamed all their outdoor parks to Plopsaland. Holiday Park and Plopsa Coo were renamed Plopsaland Deutschland and Plopsaland Ardennes respectively.

== Theme parks, Water parks and other assets ==
List of all theme parks, water parks and other assets of Plopsa that are open or in active development.

Assets (partially) owned by Plopsa
Country	City	Name	Type	Opening	Note
Belgium	Adinkerke, West Flanders	Plopsaland Belgium	Theme park	2000 (1935)	Opened in 1935 as Meli Park, acquired by Plopsa in 1999 and reopened as Plopsaland in 2000. In 2024, the resort was named to Plopsa Resort Belgian Coast after new management within the company.
Belgium	Adinkerke, West Flanders	Studio 100 Theater De Panne	Theater	2013	Opened in 2013 as Plopsa Theater, renamed in 2019 to Proximus Theater, renamed in 2024 to Studio 100 Theater De Panne.
Belgium	Adinkerke, West Flanders	Plopsaqua De Panne	Water park	2015	First water park in the Plopsa chain.
Belgium	Adinkerke, West Flanders	Plopsa Hotel	Hotel	2021	
Belgium	Adinkerke, West Flanders	Plopsa Village	Camping	2022 (1965)	Opened in 1965, acquired in 2017 and is in development to reopen in fases from 2021 as Plopsa Village with a camping site, mobile homes and holiday villages.
Belgium	Wijnegem, Antwerp	Plopsa Store	Store	1998	Opened in 1998 with the name De Kijkbuis, renamed in 2004 to Plopsa Store.
Belgium	Hasselt, Limburg	Plopsa Indoor Hasselt	Theme park	2005	
Belgium	Antwerp, Antwerp	Plopsa Station Antwerp	Theme park	2021 (2017)	Opened in 2017 as Comic Station Antwerp, acquired by Plopsa in 2019 and reopened as Plopsa Station Antwerp in October 2021. It will close in 2025, because it's not profitable.
Belgium	Stavelot, Liège	Plopsaland Ardennes	Theme park	2007 (1976)	Opened in 1976 as Télécoo, acquired in 2005 and reopened as Plopsa Coo in 2007. First Plopsa park on the French-speaking side of Belgium (Wallonia).
Belgium	Hannut, Liège	Plopsaqua Hannuit-Landen	Water park	2020/2021	Due to the COVID-19 pandemic measures only the 25 meter pool opens 11 December 2020. The rest of the water park followed on 9 June 2021.
The Netherlands	Coevorden, Drenthe	Plopsa Indoor Coevorden	Theme park	2010	First Plopsa park outside of Belgium.
Germany	Haßloch, Rhineland-Palatinate	Plopsaland Deutschland	Theme park	2010 (1971)	Opened in 1971, acquired in 2010 by Plopsa. First Plopsa park in a non-Dutch speaking country.
Poland	Torzym, Lubusz	Majaland Kownaty	Theme park	2018	This theme park is owned for 21% by Plopsa and for 79% by Momentum Capital.
Poland	Warsaw, Masovia	Majaland Warsaw	Theme park	2022	This theme park is owned for 21% by Plopsa and for 79% by Momentum Capital.
Assets owned by third parties under a licence by Plopsa
Czech Republic	Prague	Majaland Praha	Theme park	2021	This theme park is owned by TNI Group and Kaprain.

Current and future locations of Plopsa in Belgium. Red: themepark, Blue: waterpark, Green: other asset.
Current and future locations of Plopsa in the rest of Europe. Red: themepark, Blue: waterpark, Green: other asset.

=== Investments ===
A list of all investments of the Plopsa Group in their current and new parks.

Country	Resort/Park, City	Investment	Type	Opening	Cost	Note
Belgium	Plopsa Coo, Stavelot	The Smurfer	Attraction	2022		Rethematization of Halvar
Germany	Holiday Park Resort, Haßloch	Water playground	Attraction	2023	€3.5 million	
Poland	Majaland Gdańsk, Gdańsk		Theme park	2023	€20 million	This theme park is owned for 21% by Plopsa and for 79% by Momentum Capital.
Belgium	Plopsaland Resort, Adinkerke	Circus Bumba	Attraction	2023		
Germany	Holiday Park Resort, Haßloch	Tomorrowland-themed area	Attraction	2024	€15 million	
Poland	Majaland Katowice,Katowice		Theme park	2024		This theme park is owned for 21% by Plopsa and for 79% by Momentum Capital.
Belgium	Plopsaland Resort, Adinkerke	Plopsa Village extension	Accommodation	2024	€30 million	
Germany	Holiday Park Resort, Haßloch	Holiday Park Hotel	Accommodation	2024	€20 million	
Germany	Holiday Park Resort, Haßloch	Holiday Wasserpark	Water park	2025	€22.5 million	
Belgium	Plopsaqua Mechelen, Mechelen		Water park	2025	€50 million	
Poland	Water park, Warsaw		Water park	T.B.D.		This water park is owned for 21% by Plopsa and for 79% by Momentum Capital.

During a corruption investigation to a city official of The Hague in 2019 it was discovered that Plopsa was actively searching for a new site in The Netherlands to expand with a Plopsaqua and a possible second Plopsa Indoor. During an interview with RTL Nieuws Steve van den Kerkhof confirmed this and that Plopsa was in talks with the city of The Hague, but that they were also investigating other sites in The Netherlands. Since the interview no updates were given to the Dutch expansion.
