= Cho =

Cho or CHO may refer to:

== People ==
- Chief Happiness Officer
- Chief Heat Officer

=== Surnames ===
- Cho (Korean surname) (조), Korean surname
- Zhuo (卓), romanized Cho in Wade–Giles, Chinese surname
- Cho, a Minnan romanization of the Chinese surname Cao (曹)
- Chō (張), Japanese surname from Chinese Zhang
  - Chō (born 1957), Japanese actor and voice actor
  - Fujio Cho (born 1937), Japanese chairman
  - Isamu Chō (1895–1945), Japanese lieutenant general
  - Cho U (born 1980), Taiwanese Go player
- Mohamed-Ali Cho (born 2004), French footballer of Ivorian descent

==== Fictional characters ====
- Cho Hakkai, the Japanese name for Zhū Bājiè or "Pigsy", a character in the 16th-century Chinese novel, Journey to the West, by Wu Cheng'en
  - Cho Hakkai (Saiyuki), the same character in the manga and anime series Saiyuki, based on the novel

=== Given name ===
- Cho Ramaswamy (1934–2016), Indian actor and writer
- Cho, a Burmese given name meaning "sweet"
  - Rich Cho (born 1965), American basketball executive
  - Ba Cho (1893–1947), Burmese newspaper publisher and politician

==== Fictional characters ====
- Cho Chang, a fictional character from the Harry Potter series
- Amadeus Cho, a fictional character from the Marvel series

=== Nicknames and stagenames ===
- Yūichi Nagashima, a Japanese voice actor who goes by the stage name Chō
- Callum Hudson-Odoi, abbreviated to CHO, an English professional footballer

== Entertainment ==
- Center-hand opponent, a term used in the card game bridge: see Glossary of contract bridge terms
- Cho (rapper) (born 1993), Dutch rapper
- "Chō" (Shizuka Kudo song), 1996
- Chō (Tsuki Amano song)

== Science and mathematics ==
- -CHO, the chemical symbol for an aldehyde
- Cubohemioctahedron, in geometry, a nonconvex uniform polyhedron
- Chinese hamster ovary cell (CHO cell)
- Carbohydrate, referencing the three constituent elements, carbon (C), hydrogen (H) and oxygen (O)
- CHO, a mnemonic used to teach trigonometry, showing that the cosecant of an angle in a triangle is the ratio of the length of the hypotenuse over the length opposite side

== Technology ==
- Chō, an ancient Japanese unit of length, approximately equal to 109.1 metres (358 ft)
- Chō, also used as a unit of area in Japan, approximately equal to 2.449 acres (0.991 ha)
- Internal codename for the Nokia 6681

== Codes ==
- CHO, the IATA code for Charlottesville–Albemarle Airport in Virginia
- cho, the ISO 639-2 and -3 code for the Choctaw language
- CHO, the National Rail code for Cholsey railway station in Oxfordshire, England

== Other uses ==
- Chō, a romanization of the suffix for towns in Japan
