= Plopsaland Belgium =

Amusement park in De Panne, Belgium

- Previously known as Plopsaland De Panne and Meli Park
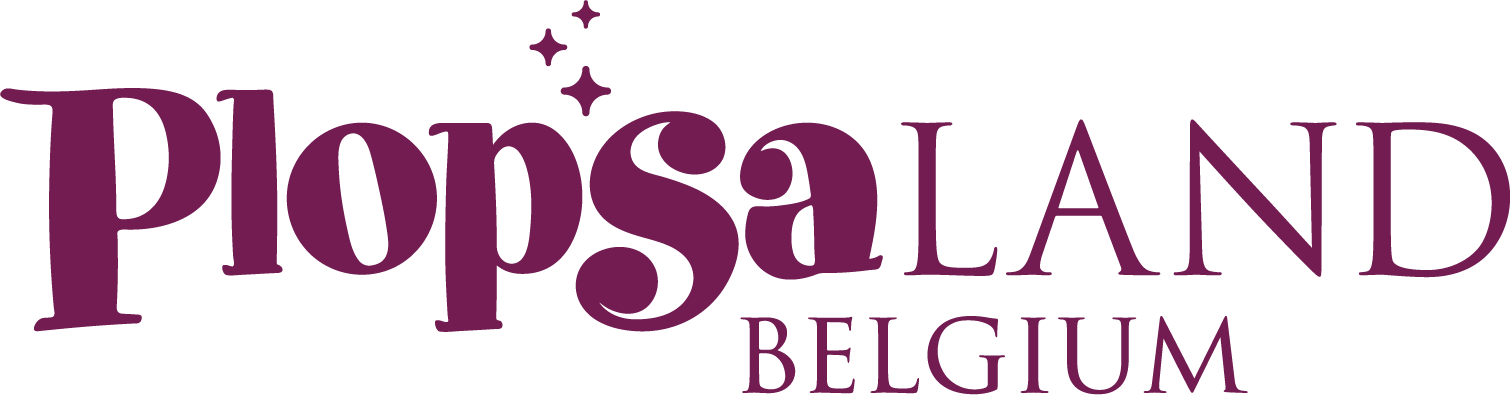
- Interactive map of Plopsaland Belgium
- Location: Adinkerke, De Panne, West-Vlaanderen, Belgium
- Coordinates: 51°04′47″N 2°35′49″E
- Opened: April 21, 1935 (as Meli Park); April 20, 2000 (as Plopsaland)
- Owner: Plopsa/Studio 100
- Operating season: April to January
- Attendance: 1.3 million in 2017

Attractions
- Total: 37
- Roller coasters: 7
- Water rides: 2
- Website: official website

Plopsaland Belgium (previously Plopsaland De Panne) is a theme park located in Adinkerke, Belgium, in the municipality of De Panne, and owned and operated by Plopsa. The park was originally known as Meli Park from 1935 to 1999, before reopening as Plopsaland on 20 April 2000.

== History ==
=== Meli Park ===
In 1935, Alberic-Joseph Florizoone opened Meli Park as a place where he could sell his home-produced honey and also teach visitors about the process and the honey bee itself. To keep up with competition, over the years the park opened several attractions, turning it into a theme park.

=== Plopsaland ===
The Florizoone family sold the park in 1999 to Studio 100 and VMMa. The park received a makeover during the following winter season, to reopen as Plopsaland on 20 April 2000. During the renovation several characters from Studio 100, such as Samson en Gert and Kabouter Plop, were used to theme new and old attractions. The new park had some issues at reopening with parking capacity and catering, though these were corrected in the following years.

Studio 100/Plopsa bought out the shares of VVMa in 2005 and became sole owner of the park, with plans to turn it into a multi-day, all-weather resort. In that same year, Plopsa opened Plopsa Indoor Hasselt and bought Telecoo, to avoid confusion with the other parks Plopsaland was renamed to Plopsaland De Panne.

Besides expanding the site into a resort, Plopsa also kept expanding the theme park with Anubis the Ride (2009), Vic the Vicking-land (2013), Heidi the Ride (2017) , The Ride to Happiness (2021) and Circus Bumba(2023) in order to appeal to a wider demographic and become a destination not just for families with younger children.

In the summer of 2025, the park was renamed from Plopsaland De Panne to Plopsaland Belgium, in line with the other parks in the Plopsa group.

== Attractions ==
The park consists of 55 attractions, including 7 rollercoasters.

=== Rollercoasters ===
Name	Official English name	Type	Manufacturer	Description and additional information	Opened	Specifications	Photo
The Ride to Happiness by Tomorrowland	The Ride to Happiness by Tomorrowland	Extreme Spinning Coaster	Mack Rides	This is the first Mack Extreme Spinning Coaster in Europe.	2021	Speed: 90 km/h Length: 920m Height: 35m	
Anubis The Ride	Anubis The Ride	Launched coaster	Gerstlauer		2009	Speed: 90 km/h Length: 600m Height: 34m	
Heidi The Ride	Heidi The Ride	Wooden coaster	Great Coasters International		2017	Speed: 71 km/h Length: 618m Height: 22m	
Draconis	Draconis	Powered coaster	Mack Rides	Renamed from De Draak (The Dragon) to Draconis at the start of the 2025 season.	2004	Speed: 36 km/h Length: 450m Height: 14m	
SuperSplash	SuperSplash	Super Splash	Mack Rides		2006	Speed: 70 km/h Height: 30m	
K3 Roller Skater	K3 Roller Skater	Junior coaster	Vekoma		1991	Speed: 46 km/h Length: 335m Height: 13m	
#LikeMe Coaster	#LikeMe Coaster	Tivoli Large	Zierer	Renovated in 2022 after the youth series #LikeMe. The station is now designed as a school from the series.	1976	Speed: 34 km/h Length: 360m Height: 8m	

=== Darkrides ===
Name	Official English name	Type	Manufacturer	Description and additional information	Opened	Photo
Op Reis Met Bumba	Bumba's World Trip	Darkride	Metallbau Emmeln	Based on the popular Belgian children's TV show "Bumba". Part of the new for 2023 "Circus Bumba" indoor area.	2023	
Het Bos van Plop	Plop's Woods	Darkride	Metallbau Emmeln	Boat trip through a forest full of gnomes.	1979 (Apirama) 2000 (Bos van Plop)	

=== Other attractions ===
Name	Official English name	Type	Manufacturer	Description and additional information	Opened	Photo
Wickie's Wervelwind	Vic's Whirlwind	Wild Swing	ART Engineering	Part of "Wickieland", based on Vic the Viking.	2025	
Bumballoon	Bumballoon	Samba Balloon	Zamperla	Part of the new for 2023 "Circus Bumba" indoor area.	2023	
De Dolle Busrit	The Crazy Bus	Crazy Bus	Zamperla	Part of the new for 2023 "Circus Bumba" indoor area.	2023	
Tumbi's Ballenbad	Tumbi's Ball Pool	Ball pool		Part of the new for 2023 "Circus Bumba" indoor area.	2023	
Poppa's Klimtoren	Poppa's Climbing Tower	Playground		Part of the new for 2023 "Circus Bumba" indoor area.	2023	
Bumba's Speeltuin	Bumba's Playground	Playground			2008	
Tik Tak	Tik Tak	Free flow boat ride	Mack Rides	Renovated in 2022. Previously known as "De Vaat" and "Kaatje zoekt Eendje".	2000	
Balloon Race	Balloon Race	Balloon Race	Zamperla		2001	
De Tuin van Big	Big's Garden	Playground			2005	
DinoSplash	DinoSplash	Log flume	Mack Rides	Renovated in 2019 to a dinosaur theme.	1989	
Mega Mindy Jetski	Mega Mindy Jet-ski	Jet Skis	Zierer		2008	
Nachtwacht-Flyer	Nachtwacht-Flyer	Starflyer	Funtime		2006	
De Ploptuin	Plop's Garden	Playground		Renovated in 2010.	1984	
Plopsa Express	Plopsa Express	Train ride	Chance Rides	Has 2 trains and 4 stations around the park.	1983	
Safari	Safari	Car ride	Sartori Montagnana		1992	
Storm op Zee	Storm At Sea	Music Express	Mack Rides		2001	
De Dierenmolen	The Animal Carousel	Farm Animals Carrousel	Wooddesign		2017	
De Doorloopweide	The Animal Farm	Petting zoo			2007	
Het Ballenbad	The Ball Bath	Ball pool		Part of the indoor area "Mayaland", based on Maya the Bee.	2011	
Big & Betsy Hoeve	The Big & Betsy Farm	Farm / zoo		Meli Park bought the farm in 1986.	Unknown	
De Grote Golf	The Big Wave	Disk'O Coaster	Zamperla	Part of "Wickieland", based on Vic the Viking.	2013	
De Emmer	The Bucket	Splash pad			2007	
Scooter	The Bumper Cars	Bumper cars	Bertazzon		Unknown	
De Glijbaan	The Chute	Slide	Metallbau Emmeln	Part of the indoor area "Mayaland", based on Maya the Bee.	2011	
De Klimboom	The Climbing Tree	Playground		Part of the indoor area "Mayaland", based on Maya the Bee.	2011	
De Koffiekopjes	The Coffee Cups	Teacups ride	Mack Rides	Renovated in 2015. During this renovation, the attraction was completely covered by a castle.	2003	
De Dansende Fonteinen	The Dancing Fountains	Splash pad			2001	
De Eenden	The Ducks	Duck Roundabout	Metallbau Emmeln		2000	
De Valtoren	The Falling Tower	Family free fall tower	Zierer	Part of the indoor area "Mayaland", based on Maya the Bee.	2011	
De Bloemenmolen	The Flowery Merry-go-Round	Flying Fish	Zierer	Part of the indoor area "Mayaland", based on Maya the Bee. A special song was written for this attraction.	2011	
De Vliegende Fietsen	The Flying Bikes	Magic Bikes	Zamperla		2008	
De Kikkers	The Frogs	Jump Around	Zamperla		2007	
Carrousel	The Merry-go-Round	Carrousel	Wooddesign		2004	
Waterfietsen	The Pedal Boats	Pedal Boats		In 2012, the standard boats were replaced by pedal boats in the shape of swans.	1995	
De Piratenboot	The Pirate Ship	Pirate Ship	HUSS Park Attractions		1981	
De Piratenspeeltuin	The Pirates' Playground	Playground			2006	
De konijntjes	The Rabbits	Ponytrekking	Metallbau Emmeln		2007	
Het Vlot	The Raft	Raft		Part of the indoor area "Mayaland", based on Maya the Bee.	2011	
Het Spinnenweb	The Spider's Web	Playground		Part of the indoor area "Mayaland", based on Maya the Bee.	2011	
De Hangbrug	The Suspension Bridge	Suspension bridge	Kaiser & Kuhne		1995	
De Swingboom	The Swinging Tree	Kontiki	Zierer	Part of the indoor area "Mayaland", based on Maya the Bee.	2011	
De Tractors	The Tractors	Car ride	Metallbau Emmeln		2002	
Het Verkeerspark	The Traffic Park	Driving school			2000	
De Waterlelies	The Water Lilies	Demolition Derby	Zamperla	Part of the indoor area "Mayaland", based on Maya the Bee.	2011	
Wickie The Battle	Wickie The Battle	Splash Battle	Mack Rides	Part of "Wickieland", based on Vic the Viking.	2013	
Wienerwalz	Wienerwalz	Wave swing	Wooddesign		2015	
Willies Speeltuin	Willy's Playground	Playground		Part of the indoor area "Mayaland", based on Maya the Bee.	2011	

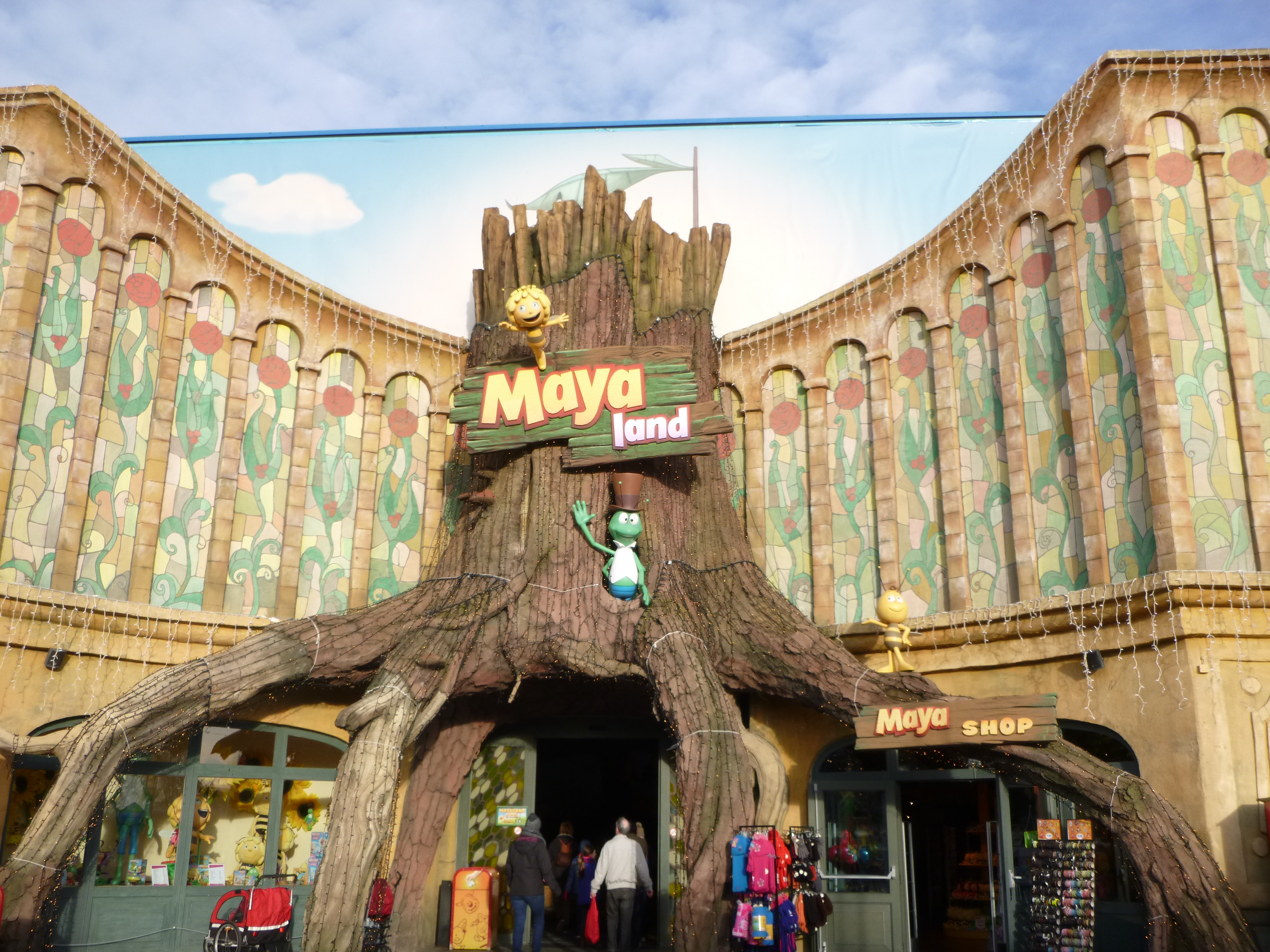
Mayaland Indoor

== De Panne resort ==
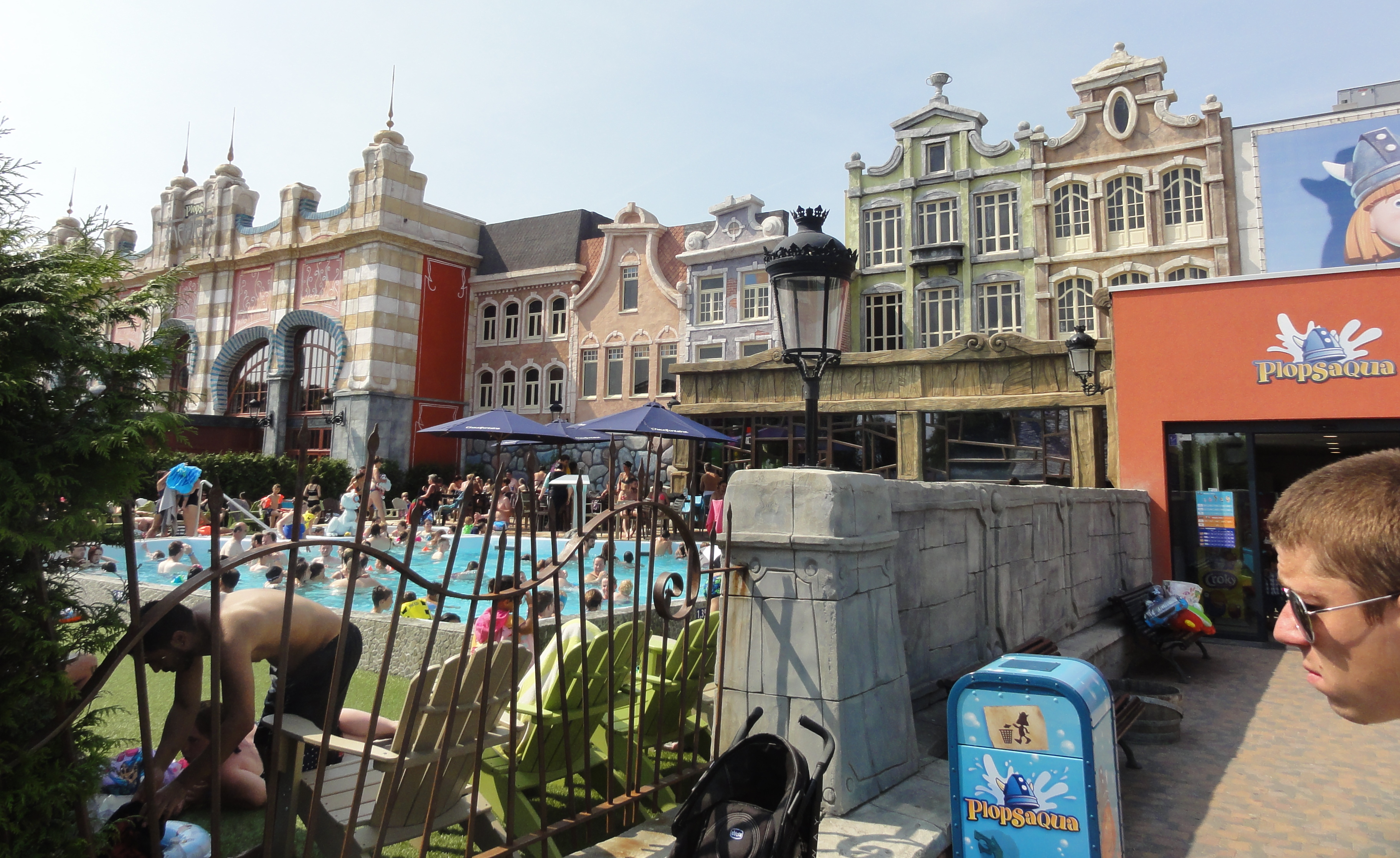
Plopsaqua and the Studio 100 Theater in the background

The theme park is part of the larger Plopsa resort that consist of Mayaland, an indoor theme park (2011), the Studio 100 Theater (2013), Plopsaqua De Panne (2015), a hotel (2021) and a camping (2021/2022). The resort also houses the headquarters of the Plopsa-group.

== Visitor numbers ==
Below is an overview of the development of Plopsaland visitor numbers, as stated in the annual report.

Year	Visitors
2011	1.221.108 ▲
2012	1.176.639 ▼
2013	1.222.169 ▲
2014	1.280.947 ▲
2015	1.276.302 ▼
2016	1.353.162 ▲
2017	1.398.172 ▲
2018	1.209.512 ▼

== Trivia ==
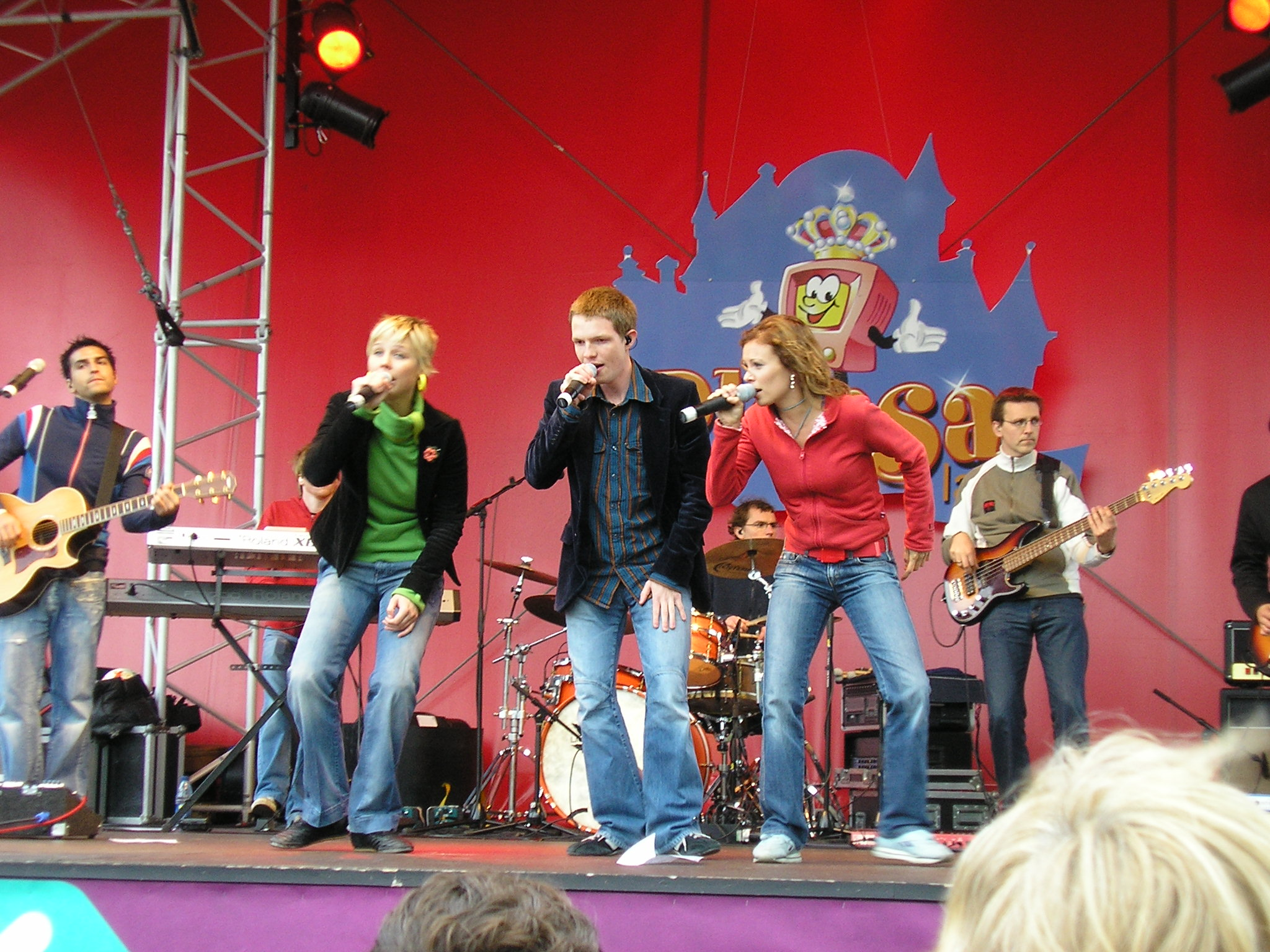
Koning Plopsa on the backdrop

- The name Plopsaland is an aggregation of the first two Studio 100 characters Plop and Samson. Another name that the new owners thought of was Pannadine after the town De Panne, this name was abandoned after the new owners discovered it was a medical creme.
- From 2000 until 2012 the park - and the other parks of the group - had Koning Plopsa as icon. In recent years the character was taken out of the logo's, parkshows and as a walk-around character. At various places around the resort the icon can still be found.
