= Chief happiness officer =

Manager of worker's happiness

A chief happiness officer (CHO), or more rarely chief fun officer, is the manager of workers' happiness within a company. Probably originating in North America, CHO posts are being created in European and UK companies to ensure workers' welfare needs are met.

The role has been criticized for its possible cringiness, when it includes forms of compulsory fun (or mandatory fun): "Managers hope that "fun" will magically make workers more engaged and creative. But the problem is that as soon as fun becomes part of a corporate strategy it ceases to be fun and becomes its opposite—at best an empty shell and at worst a tiresome imposition."

== In popular culture ==
In the tabletop role-playing game Paranoia (1984), characters may have to accomplish "Mandatory Bonus Fun Duties" (first presented in the supplement Acute Paranoia, first published in 1986), one of which is happiness officer. Their job is to ensure that people under their care are happy. In the dystopia of the game, being happy is mandatory and punishable by law. So the happiness officer will use any tool he can to ensure everybody is happy, from singing in choir for better morale up to heavy medications to maintain artificial — but mandatory — happiness.
