= Plopsaland Ardennes =

Theme park in Belgium

- Previously known as Télécoo and Plopsa Coo
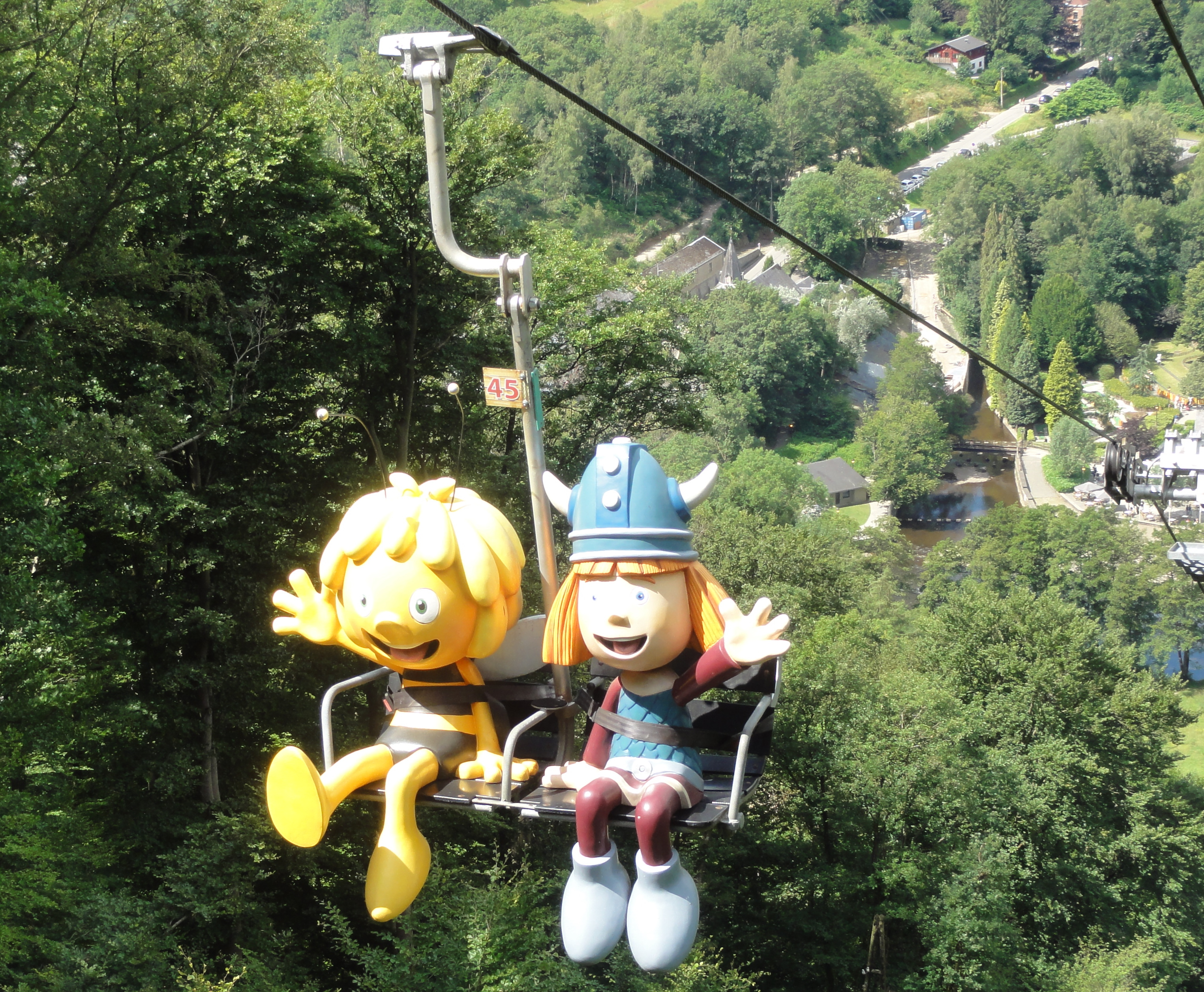
- Interactive map of Plopsaland Ardennes
- Location: Stavelot, Belgium
- Coordinates: 50.39514°N 5.87627°E
- Opened: 1976 as Télécoo; 2007 as Plopsa Coo
- Owner: Plopsa
- Attendance: ▼215.000 (2019)

Attractions
- Total: 23
- Roller coasters: 2
- Water rides: 2
- Website: www.plopsa.com

Plopsaland Ardennes, formerly known as Télécoo and Plopsa Coo, is a themepark in Wallonia near the waterfalls of Coo in Stavelot, owned and operated by Plopsa. It is a popular destination in Wallonia and known in Belgium.

== History ==
=== Waterfalls ===
The history of the park starts in the 15th century, when the first small waterfall of Coo was created. Two centuries later monks built a second larger waterfall to protect the village of Petit-Coo from flooding. From the 18th century, as mobility grew, more and more tourists came to see the waterfalls, therefor a self-service restaurant was opened in 1920. It wasn't until 1955 that a first attraction appeared at the site, when Professor Gaston Dugardin opened a chairlift - called Le Télésiege - that took visitors to the top of a 220-meter hill. In the decades that followed Dugardin opened a go-kart track, mini golf and a playground.

=== Télécoo ===
In 1976 Gaston handed over the operation to his son, Didier Dugardin. He turned the area into an amusement park and called it Télécoo, a combination of the first attraction Le Télésiege and the village where the park was located Petit-Coo. In the 1980s Télécoo expanded with a number of attractions, including a simulator, a classic car track, two bobsleigh tracks and in 1989 a roller coaster and a wildpark.

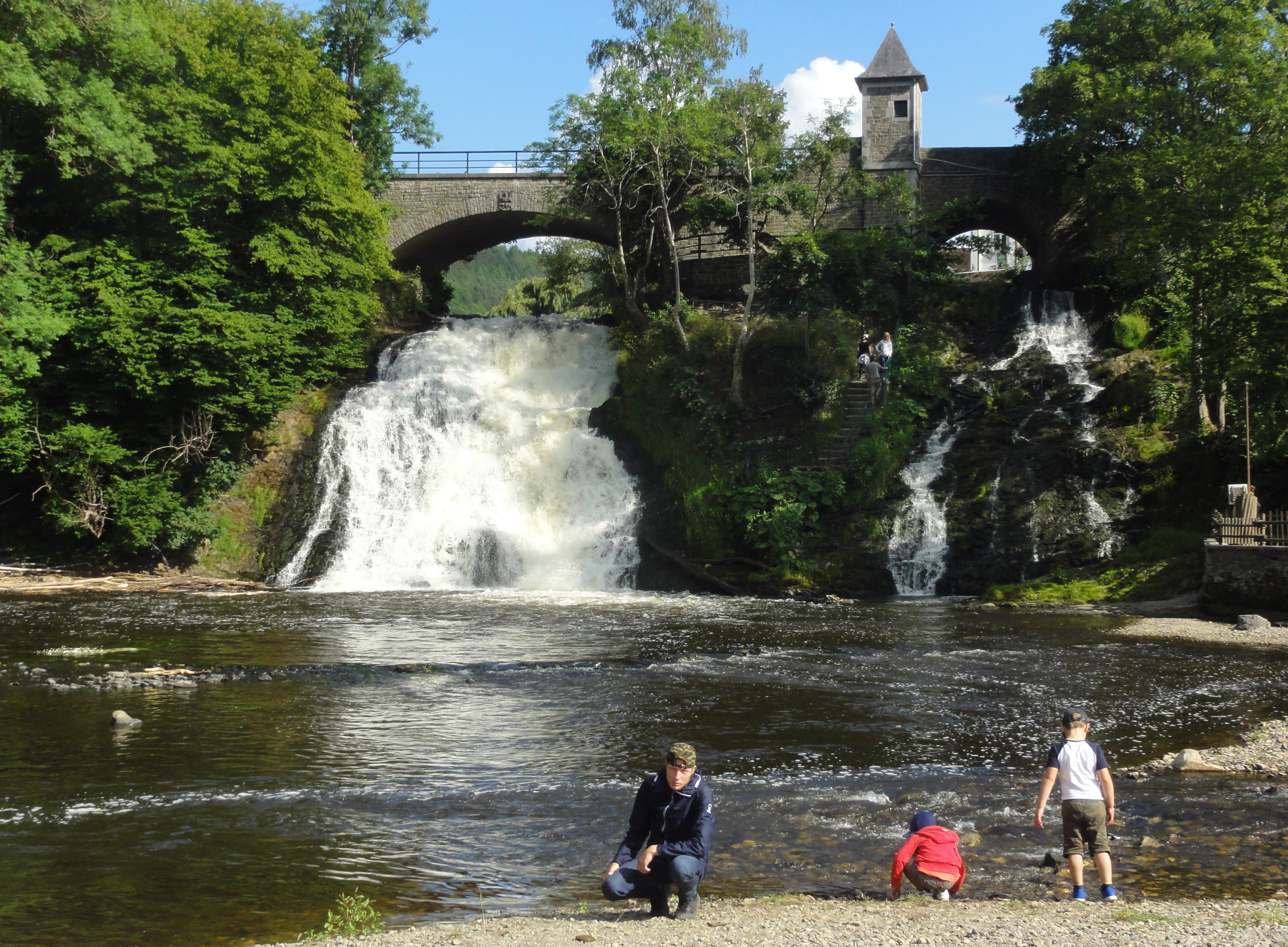
Waterfalls of Coo

In the 1990s Télécoo had a hard time, they could not compete with Walibi Belgium and Bobbejaanland, which grew strongly. In this decade the park opened just one attraction, a tree trunk attraction called Splash. At the end of the 1990s other Belgian parks were taken over by large companies: Premier Parks took over Walibi and Bellewaerde and Meli Park was taken over by Studio 100. Didier Dugardin also decided to sell his park. However no buyer wanted to do that, which made that in 2004 Télécoo was the only Belgian amusement park that was still in the hands of the family that originally built it.

=== Plopsa Coo ===
In December of 2005 Studio 100 / Plopsa took over the entire domain of Télécoo for € 6 million, the company took over so they could make their characters popular in Wallonia. The domain of Télécoo also included Targnon Adventure (team building activities), CooKayak (kayak rental) and Château de Targnon (room rental). The first two were also taken over by Plopsa, but the Château (through the company Immosoirheid) was personally taken over by Gert Verhulst and Hans Bourlon.

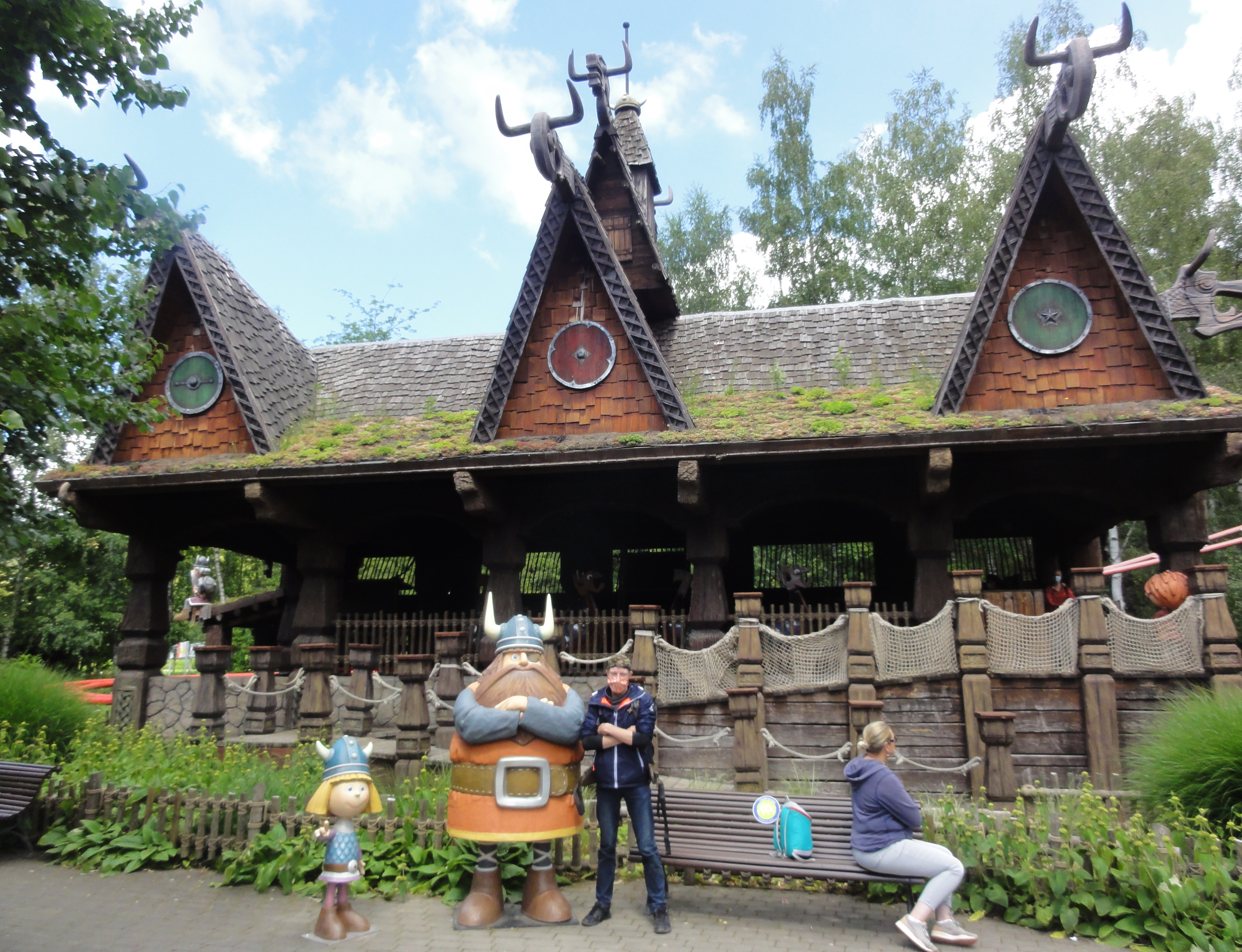
Vicky the ride

After the takeover, the park opened in the 2006 season as it did before, while the new owner started working on various adjustments. Various attractions - such as the go-kart track and the roller coaster were renovated, various shops were removed and the greenery was embellished. Several attractions were also added, such as the dancing fountains, pedal boats and a carousel. On March 31, 2007 the renovated park was officially opened under the new name Plopsa Coo.

In the following years the park was further expanded with the Vliegende Fietsen (2008), the Octopus (2008-2018), the Konijntjes (2008), the JBC Laburint (2008), the Autorijschool (2009), Vicky the Ride (2011), DinoSplash (2015), Doorloopweide (2015), a playground (2019) and the Vlindervlucht (2020). The tree trunk attraction was provided with a new Maya the Bee theme in 2011. The rollercoaster changed its theme twice, first in 2011 to Piet Piraat and in 2014 to Vicky the Viking with the name Halvar.

The Wildlife Park was resold in 2013 and has since been closed for Plopsa Coo visitors.

During the 2021 European floods the park got flooded and all attractions, shops and other facilities got severely damaged. The Plopsa Group sent help from their other parks and within a week Plopsa Coo was ready to re-open.

== Future ==
Plopsa presented the future vision for Plopsa Coo in 2019, € 25 million was to be invested in the park with the arrival of a hotel, indoor park, a water park and an upgrade of the layout of the walkways. All expansions would be completed by 2025. However the plan has been paused by Plopsa, because there is plan to increase the taxes for the park. In the proposed plans by the municipal councillors Plopsa Coo should pay six times as much tax from € 50,000 per year to € 300,000 per year.

== Visitor numbers ==
Below is an overview of the development of Plopsa Coo's visitor numbers, as stated in the annual figures.

Year	Visitors
2011	366.900 ▲
2012	344.626 ▼
2013	340.048 ▼
2014	299.613 ▼
2015	317.696 ▲
2016	244.587 ▼
2017	250.947 ▲
2018	234.005 ▼
2019	215.000 ▼
