= Team building =

Term for activities used to enhance social relations and define roles within teams

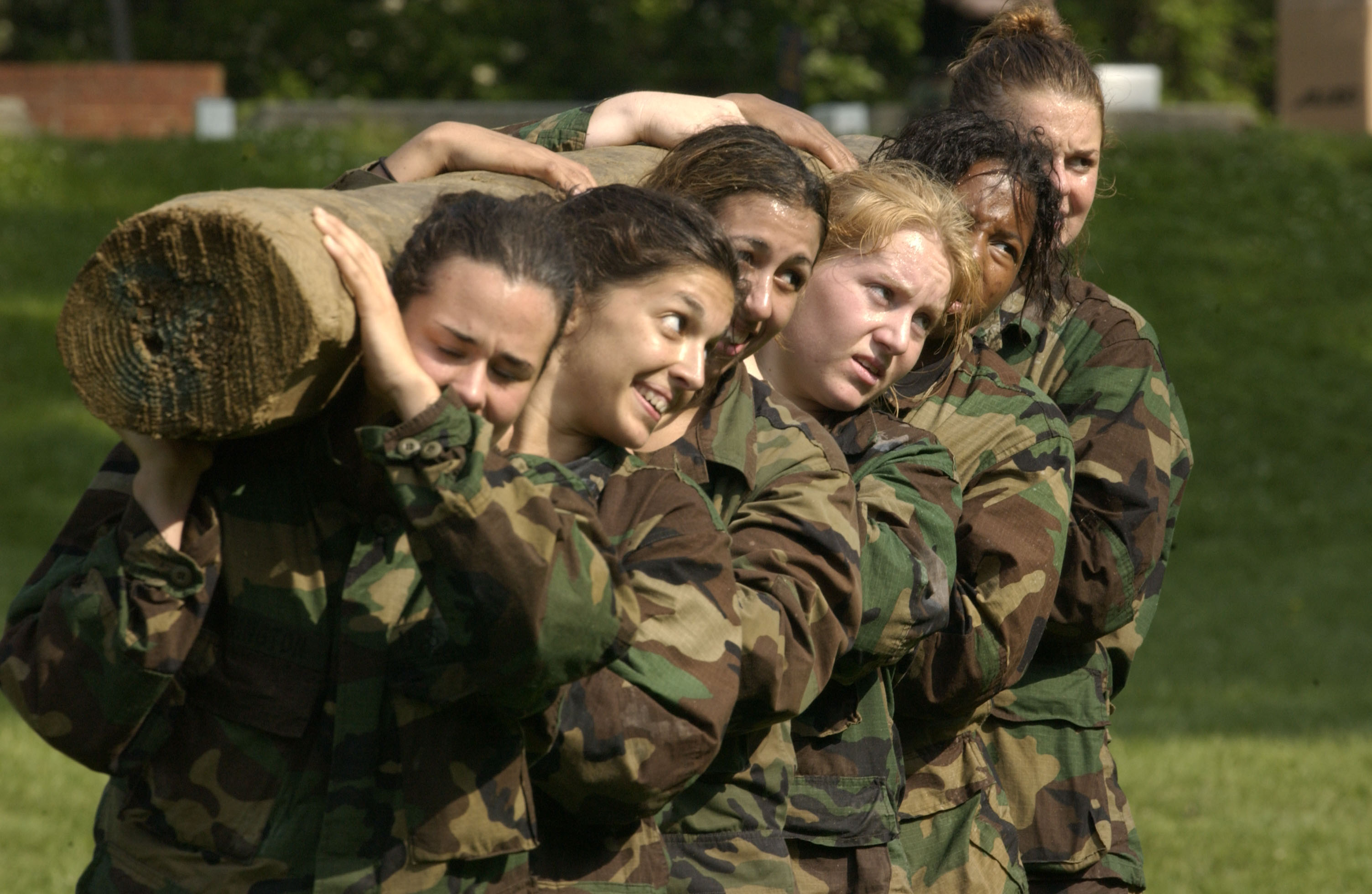
The US military uses lifting a log as a team-building exercise.

Team building is a collective term for various interventions that improve team effectiveness and define roles within teams, often involving collaborative tasks. It is distinct from team training, which is designed by a combination of business managers, learning and development/OD (Internal or external) and an HR Business Partner (if the role exists) to improve the efficiency, rather than interpersonal relations.

It is also distinct from team recreation that focuses on activities for teams to enjoy together to have fun.

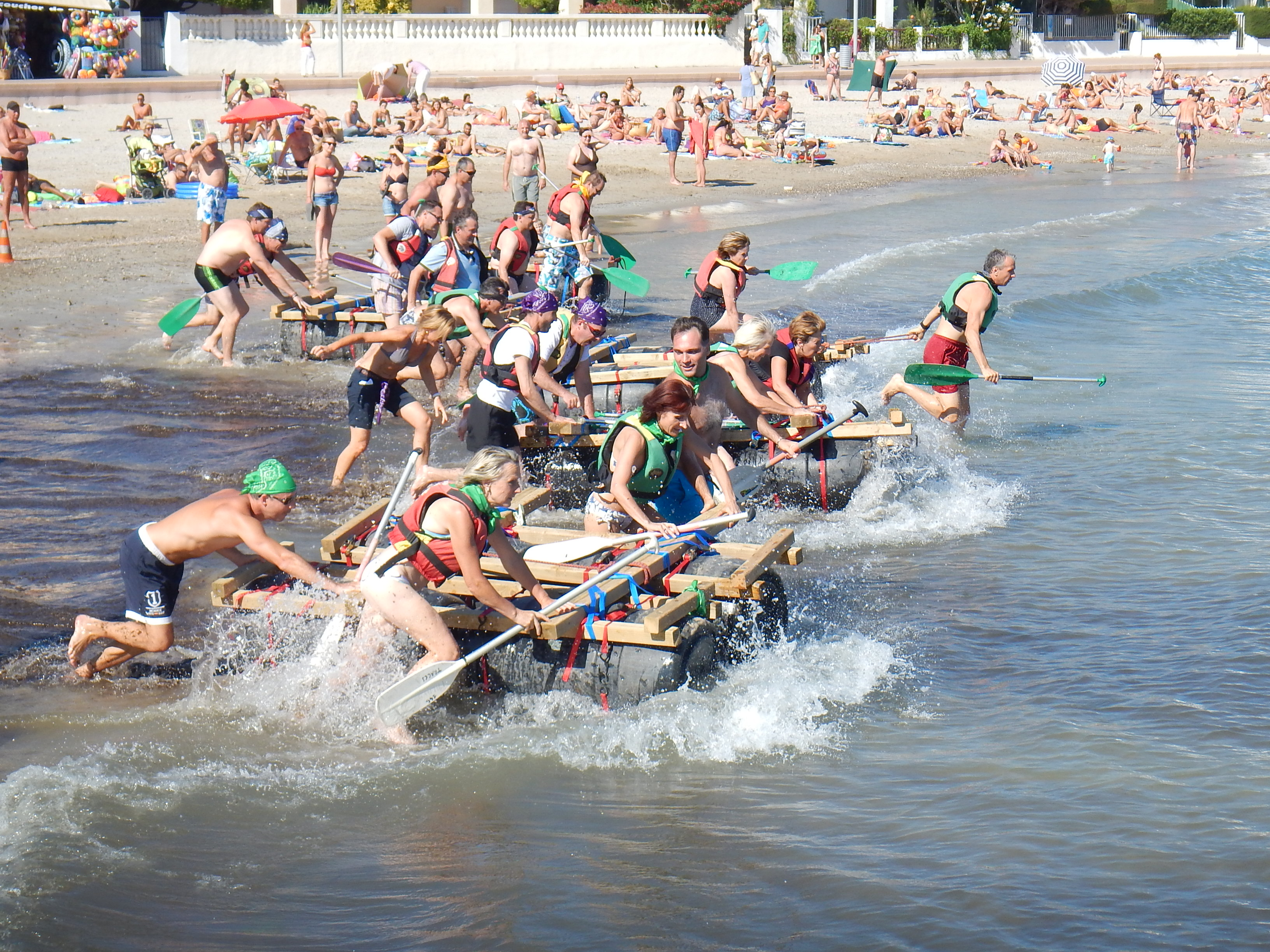
These teams have built small ocean-going rafts as part of a team-building exercise.

Many team-building exercises aim to expose and address problems in interaction between group members.

Over time, these activities are intended to improve performance in a team-based environment. Team building is one of the foundations of organizational development that can be applied to groups such as sports teams, school classes, military units or flight crews. The formal definition of team-building includes:

- aligning around goals
- building effective working relationships
- reducing team members' role ambiguity
- finding solutions to team problems

Team building is one of the most widely used group-development activities in organizations. A common strategy is to have a "team-building retreat" or "corporate love-in," where team members try to address underlying concerns and build trust by engaging in activities that are not part of what they ordinarily do as a team.

Of all organizational activities, one study found team-development to have the strongest effect (versus financial measures) for improving organizational performance. A 2008 meta-analysis found that team-development activities, including team building and team training, improve both a team's objective performance and that team's subjective supervisory ratings. Team building can also be achieved by targeted personal self-disclosure activities.

== Four approaches ==
Team building describes four approaches to team building:

=== Setting goals ===
This emphasizes the importance of clear objectives and team goals. Team members become involved in action planning to identify ways to define success and failure and achieve goals. This is intended to strengthen motivation and foster a sense of ownership. By identifying specific outcomes and tests of incremental success, teams can measure their progress. Many organizations negotiate a team charter with the team and (union leaders)

=== Role clarification ===
This emphasizes improving team members' understanding of their own roles and duties, as well as those of others. It is intended to reduce ambiguity and foster an understanding of the importance of structure through activities aimed at defining and adjusting roles. It also emphasizes members' interdependence and the value of each member focusing on their own role in the team's success.

=== Problem solving ===
This emphasizes identifying major problems

=== Interpersonal-relations ===
This emphasizes increasing teamwork skills such as giving and receiving support, communication and sharing. Teams with fewer interpersonal conflicts generally function more effectively than others. A facilitator guides the conversations to develop mutual trust and open communication between team members.

== Effectiveness ==
The effectiveness of team building differs substantially from one organization to another. The most effective efforts occur when team members are interdependent, knowledgeable and experienced and when organizational leadership actively establishes and supports the team.

When teams are assembled, team dynamics are huge in terms of creating an effective team. Dr. Frank La Fasto identifies five dynamics that are fundamental to team effectiveness. The five dynamics of effectiveness within teams are given below.

1) Team Membership

· Team Membership is the members that make up the team.

2) Team Relationship

· Team Relationship is the relationship team members have with each other and how they interact and coexist.

3) Team Problem Solving

· Team Problem Solving is the members within a team coming to a conclusive solution to the problem at hand.

4) Team Leadership

· Team Leadership is the leader of the team and the qualities and traits they must possess to lead a team effectively.

5) Organizational Environment

· Organizational Environment is the environment from which a team works in and can directly correlate to team effectiveness.

Effective team building incorporates an awareness of team objectives. Teams must work to develop goals, roles and procedures. As a result, team building is usually associated with increasing task accomplishment, goal meeting, and achievement of results within teams.

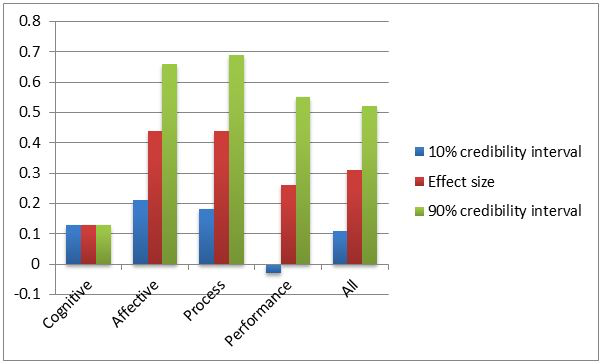
Effects of team building strategies on all four outcomes, with 10% and 90% credibility intervals

Some research indicates that team building is not as effective as it seems, and despite causing people to feel closer initially, that is often short-lived. This research indicates that starting with individual motivation is a better starting point than team building (focus on relationships and trust) when seeking to improve the level of quality collaboration.

== Effect on performance ==
Team building has been scientifically shown to positively affect team effectiveness. Goal setting and role clarification were shown to have impact on cognitive, affective, process and performance outcomes. They had the most powerful impact on affective and process outcomes, which implies that team building can help benefit teams experiencing issues with negative affect, such as lack of cohesion or trust. It could also improve teams suffering from process issues, such as lack of clarification in roles.

Goal setting and role clarification have the greatest impact because they enhance motivation, reduce conflict and help to set individual purposes, goals and motivation.

Teams with 10 or more members appear to benefit the most from team building. This is attributed to larger teams having – generally speaking – a greater reservoir of cognitive resources and capabilities than smaller teams.

== Challenges to team building ==
The term 'team building' is often used as a dodge when organizations are looking for a 'quick fix' to poor communication systems or unclear leadership directives, leading to unproductive teams with no clear of how to be successful. Team work is the best work.

Teams are then assembled to address specific problems, while the underlying causes are not ignored.

Dyer highlighted three challenges for team builders:

- Lack of teamwork skills: One of the challenges facing leaders is to find team-oriented employees. Most organizations rely on educational institutions to have inculcated these skills into students. Dyer believed however, that students are encouraged to work individually and succeed without having to collaborate. This works against the kinds of behavior needed for teamwork. Another study found that team training improved cognitive, affective, process and performance outcomes. Employee resistance and lack of teamwork skills may result where employees are required to work with other employees with whom they are unfamiliar. In this case, the new teams are breaking up established social relationships.
- Virtual workplaces and across organizational boundaries: according to Dyer, organizations individuals who are not in the same physical space increasingly work together. Members are typically unable to build concrete relationships with other team members. Another study found that face-to-face communication is very important in building an effective team environment. Face-to-face contact was key to developing trust. Formal team building sessions with a facilitator led the members to "agree to the relationship" and define how the teams were work. Informal contact was also mentioned.
- Globalization and virtualization: Teams increasingly include members who have dissimilar languages, cultures, values and problem-solving approaches problems. One-to-one meetings has been successful in some organizations.

The International Journal of Management and Entrepreneurship highlights the point of groupthink being another challenge within team building. A group thinking or making decisions in a way that discourages creativity or individual control creates potential for increased conflict over decision making.

Another challenge to team building include three types of conflict that can occur which are task conflict, process conflict and relationship conflict.

- Task Conflict: Conflict over the work or goals of the project, including different approaches, perspectives and interpretations
- Process Conflict: Conflict over how the logistics of the work are completed and assigning responsibilities
- Relationship Conflict: Conflict over interpersonal relationships, including personality clashes, differing personal views and perspectives.

== Application of team building ==
=== Schools ===
Instructors can motivate students to develop teamwork skills and provide a guideline on how professors can help students build effective study/project teams. This approach emphasizes examples of job situations that require teamwork skills.

=== Organizations ===
Team building in organizations is a common approach to improving performance.

Fun is an important component of team building, but the primary intent is to foster productivity, focus, and alignment. Purely recreational activities can be helpful, but they must be well-timed and considerate of team members' capabilities (e.g., sports are not for everyone). Other activities aimed at creating a learning environment, achieving strong results, and engaging employees should also be included.

Employee engagement and Team-building exercises allow teams to create solutions that are meaningful to them, with direct impact on the individuals, the team and the organization. Experiential learning and ramification methods are effective ways to engage millennials in the workplace. Employee engagement is effective because:

- employees enjoy problem-solving activities;
- problem-solving creates ownership;
- it can increase capacity;
- competitive activities encourage a results-based outlook.

Outdoor activities can be an effective way to engage the team, but there are many different types of team building activities possible.

In 2011, senior Human Resource leaders at Mars Inc. conducted a study on their global workforce to better understand team collaboration and team effectiveness, as they like many companies, had spent large sums of money on team building activities without much return on these investments of money and time. Their study, published in the Harvard Business Review, determined that employees are motivated by a sense of accountability for their work and strong relationships and trust are forged outcomes of dedicated people striving together. Putting success-minded people together is what unlocks productive teamwork more so than offsite, company directed teambuilding activities.

=== Sports ===
A 2010 study that analyzed the effects of team building found that team building activities increase group cohesion.

According to Yukelson, "In sports, teams are made up of a collection of interdependent individuals, coordinated and orchestrated into various task efficient roles for the purpose of achieving goals and objectives that are deemed important for that particular team".

Team building in sports develops behaviors and skills that "result in improvements in team effectiveness." A basic tenet of team building is when team members foster a sense of unity, or togetherness. This creates a catalyzing function bolstering the individual members' efforts through increased motivation. This directs them towards their common goals, and improves team performance outcomes.

A study examined whether a team building intervention program that stressed the importance of goal setting increased cohesion: 86 high school basketball players were studied. The hypothesis employed season-long goal setting. Participants were asked to individually assign targets for the team and negotiate with other team members to finalize a goal score for the team.

In the control branch, the coach occasionally encouraged participants to cheer for and support other team members. The research concluded that at the beginning of the study, all the teams had the same level of cohesion, but the team with the season long goal setting intervention program performed better.

The level of team cohesion did not increase as a result of ceiling effect with the intervention program, but the level decreased significantly for the control group. This was attributed to the lack of emphasis on team goals.

Core components for building a successful sports team:

- The coach communicates the goals and objectives to the team, defining roles and group norms.
- Team members should know what is expected from them. Mission statements can encourage the team to support each in achieving the goals.
- Team members should be trained that the team comes first and that each member is accountable for individual action and the actions of the team as a whole.
- "Team culture refers to the psychosocial leadership within the team, team motives, team identity, team sport and collective efficacy". The coach builds a positive culture. This can be done during recruiting for team-oriented athletes.
- Instill a sense of pride in group membership. Team identity can be created by motivating team members commit to team goals and have pride in performance.
- Open and honest communication process can bring the team together. This includes both verbal and non-verbal communication. Trust, honesty, mutual sharing and understanding should be emphasized. The team members should be encouraged and given the chance to speak during debriefing sessions.
- Teammates help each other before, after and during games.

Benefits of team building in sports include;

- Improved team cohesion.
- Improved communications skills on and off field.
- Increased motivation and enjoyment.
- Builds player to player and player to manager trust.
- Mitigates conflict.
- Encourages communication.

== See also ==
- Corporate entertainment
- Group development
- Industrial and organizational psychology
- Leadership development
- Mandatory fun
- Maslow's hierarchy of needs
- MICE tourism
- Personal development
- Socionics
- Team management
- Teamwork
- Team effectiveness
- Workplace politics
