= Mandatory fun =

Mandatory fun refers to organized activities or events within a workplace that are intended to be enjoyable or entertaining but are effectively mandatory for employees to attend or participate in. These events are often designed to foster team bonding, improve morale, or create a sense of camaraderie among coworkers.

While the intention behind mandatory fun activities is usually positive, they can sometimes backfire. Not everyone enjoys the same types of activities, and for some, being required to participate in social events can feel forced and even increase stress or discomfort.

For instance, activities like company picnics, team-building exercises, or themed parties might be enjoyable for some, but for others, they could be seen as a distraction from work or an invasion of personal time.

== See also ==
- Team building
