= Haßloch =

- Municipality
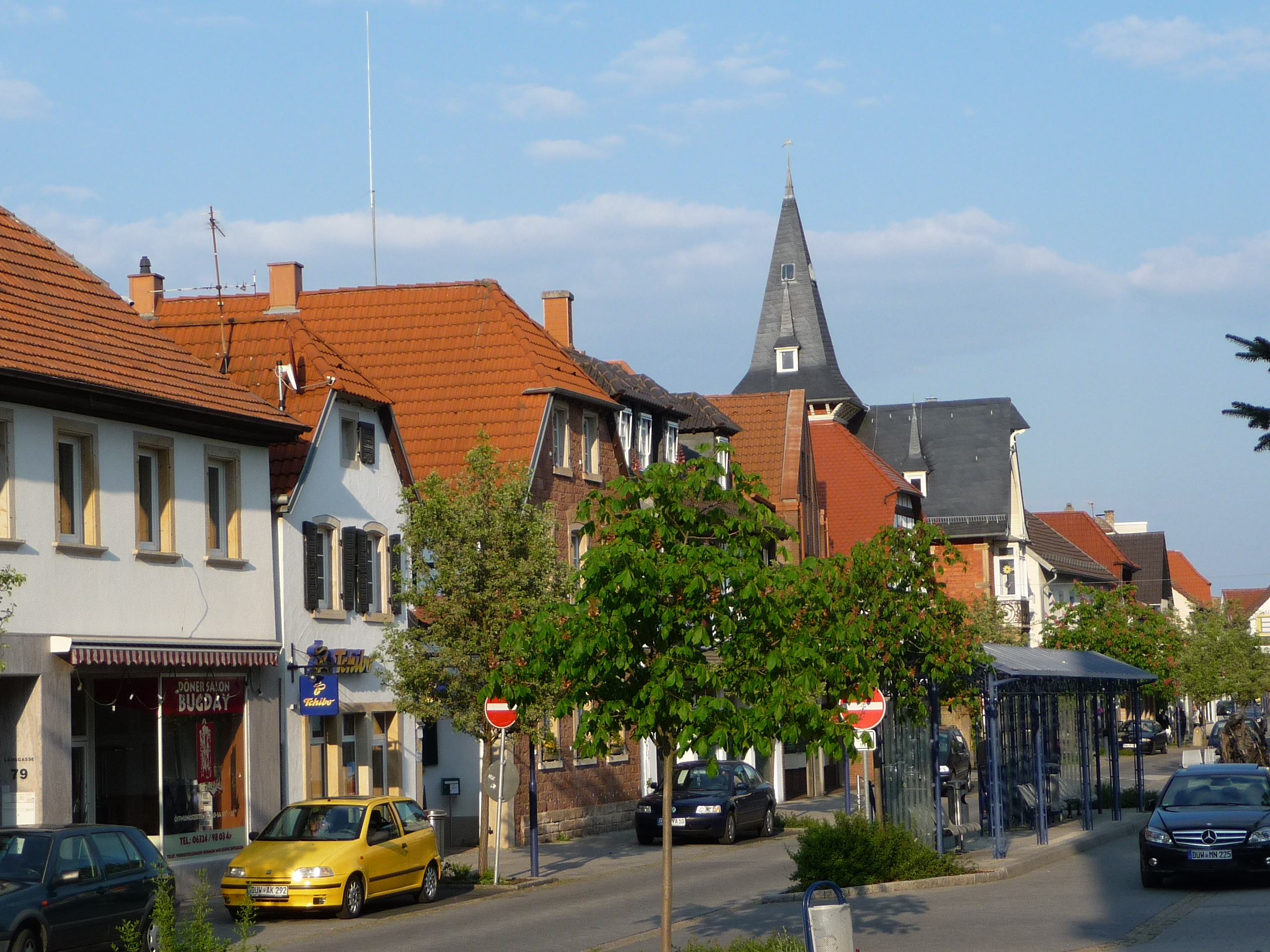

- Coat of arms

- Location of Haßloch within Bad Dürkheim district
- Interactive map of Haßloch
- Location within Germany Location within Rhineland-Palatinate
- Coordinates: 49°21′47″N 8°15′21″E
- Country: Germany
- State: Rhineland-Palatinate
- District: Bad Dürkheim

Government
  - Mayor (2020–28): Tobias Meyer (CDU)

Area
  - Total: 39.95 km^{2} (15.42 sq mi)
- Elevation: 110 m (360 ft)

Population (2025-12-31)
  - Total: 20,395
  - Density: 510.5/km^{2} (1,322/sq mi)
- Time zone: UTC+01:00 (CET)
  - Summer (DST): UTC+02:00 (CEST)
- Postal codes: 67454
- Dialling codes: 06324
- Vehicle registration: DÜW
- Website: www.hassloch.de

Haßloch (German pronunciation: [ˈhaslɔx]) is a large village in the Bad Dürkheim district in Rhineland-Palatinate, Germany. Unlike most municipalities in the district, it does not belong to any Verbandsgemeinde – a type of collective municipality. It lies near the Mannheim/Ludwigshafen built-up area. The municipality has grown out of a single centre and is thus sometimes styled “Germany’s biggest village”. Haßloch is the Bad Dürkheim district's biggest municipality, exceeding even the namesake district seat. The village has at its disposal well developed infrastructure with educational and shopping facilities; the region's surrounding centres can in the main be reached within 20 minutes.

== Geography ==
=== Location ===
Haßloch lies east of Neustadt an der Weinstraße and is part of the Rhine-Neckar urban agglomeration southwest of Mannheim and Ludwigshafen. It also lies on the Mannheim–Kaiserslautern line. At the municipality's northern limit runs Autobahn A 65, and from there it is 25 km to either Ludwigshafen or Mannheim. Haßloch is on the whole a continuous built-up area, although Haßloch's southeasternmost neighbourhood, the Wehlachsiedlung, lies somewhat apart from the main centre.

== History ==
Haßloch's beginnings stretch at least as far back as Roman times with settlement activity by the Romans known to have been taking place about AD 400. About 500, the Alamanni were driven out of the area by the Franks. The village itself came into being sometime about 600, with its first documentary mention – as Hasalaha – coming in 773 or 774.

In 985, Haßloch was one of the many villages in the region subject to the Salischer Kirchenraub, or “Salian Church Robbery”, a land grab in which Otto I, Duke of Carinthia took over ownership of various landholdings formerly belonging to the Weißenburg Monastery (in the town now called Wissembourg in Alsace, France) on the Upper and Middle Rhine.

Some time between 900 and 1000, Haßloch became an Imperial Village. In 1186, Emperor Friedrich I Barbarossa spent the night in Haßloch. In 1330, Emperor Louis the Bavarian pledged Haßloch to the Electorate of the Palatinate, who then in turn pledged three fourths of this pledge to the Counts of Leiningen in the same year.

In 1621, during the Thirty Years' War, Haßloch was laid waste by the Spaniards. In 1689, it met the same fate again, more than once, in the Nine Years' War (known in Germany as the Pfälzischer Erbfolgekrieg, or War of the Palatine Succession), this time at the hands of the Spaniards and the French.

In 1797 came an end to the joint rule by the Electorate of the Palatinate and the Counts of Leiningen. Haßloch – along with the rest of the region – was annexed to France.

In 1815 or 1816, as a result of the Congress of Vienna, the Leiningen holdings, along with the Palatinate, passed to the Kingdom of Bavaria, remaining Bavarian until the end of the Second World War. In 1843, the Pfälzische Ludwigsbahn (railway)was built.

In 1945, Haßloch became part of the French Zone of Occupation and the next year, part of the new state of Rhineland-Palatinate.

In 1969, the old district of Neustadt an der Weinstraße was abolished and Haßloch was assigned to the newly created district of Bad Dürkheim.

=== Religion ===
Haßloch, because it was ruled by the Counts of Leiningen, is a Protestant community. This can even be seen in the church buildings. All the oldest ones – Christuskirche (“Christ Church” or “Church of Christ”), Lutherkirche and Pauluskirche (“Saint Paul’s”) are Evangelical, whereas only the two newer ones – St. Gallus and St. Ulrich – belong to the Catholic parish.

=== Population development ===
(each time at 31 December)

- 1998 – 20,708
- 1999 – 20,747
- 2000 – 20,781
- 2001 – 20,826
- 2002 – 20,809
- 2003 – 20,789
- 2004 – 20,785
- 2005 – 20,722

== Origin of the name ==
The former Old High German city name 'Hasalaha' means something like 'water flowing through hazel bushes'. 'Hasal' is the Old High German term for the hazel bush, 'aha' means something like 'water' or 'stream'. Due to sound shifts and changing the spelling, the name 'Haselach' first emerged (documented around 900) and finally the present place name 'Haßloch'.

== Politics ==
=== Municipal council ===
The council is made up of 36 volunteer council members, who were elected at the municipal election held on 7 June 2009, and the full-time mayor as chairman.

The municipal election held on 9 June 2024 yielded the following results:

	SPD	CDU	GRÜNE	AfD	HLL	FWG	FDP	Total
2024	6	11	4	8	2	4	1	36 seats
2019	6	8	7	6	3	4	2	36 seats

=== Youth municipal council ===
The Haßloch Youth Municipal Council (Jugendgemeinderat Haßloch, until 1999 known as the Kinder- & Jugendgemeinderat Haßloch, or the Child and Youth Municipal Council) was enacted and established by Municipal Council on 17 May 1995. The initiative for this came from Youth Department head Jürgen Hurrle who complained that many measures were being enacted that affected youth without including these people in the decision-making process. In one of the first youth municipal councils in Rhineland-Palatinate, he took on a guiding function in the years that followed.

The Youth Municipal Council represents in an advisory capacity the needs and interests of Haßloch's youths in the municipality, either independently or through the permanent members on the social board and the partnership advisory body. It is supposed to acquaint youth with democratic decision-making structures and awaken interest in civic topics. It is a non-partisan board and is made up of 15 members (as of 2006).

Further activities in which the Youth Municipal Council engages are:

- activities against racism;
- podium discussions before elections;
- sporting events (football and beach volleyball tournaments);
- leisure events and festivals.

=== Volunteering ===
The Lokales Bündnis für Familie (“Local Alliance for Family”) has been active in Haßloch since 2006. It promotes families and volunteer work in collaboration with politics, administration, citizens, educational institutions and clubs.

=== Coat of arms ===
The municipality's arms might be described thus: Per fess in chief per pale sable a lion rampant Or armed, langued and crowned gules and azure three eagles displayed argent armed and langued of the third, two in pale in dexter and one in sinister, in base argent the letter S turned backwards of the first.

The arms were designed in 1926 by the Munich Main State Archive and officially conferred in 1938. They show the gold Palatine Lion and next to this the three silver eagles borne as arms by the Counts of Leiningen. The double hook, as it is taken to be, which looks like the letter Ƨ, goes back to a court seal from the time when Haßloch was a pledged holding. Heraldry of the World, quoting another source, furthermore says that the Ƨ is a symbol that was used on “borderstones and decorations” beginning in the 18th century.

=== Town partnerships ===
Haßloch fosters partnerships with the following places:

- Viroflay, Yvelines, France
- (Germany) Gebesee, Sömmerda, Thuringia
- Silifke, Mersin Province, Turkey
- Wołczyn, Opole Voivodeship, Poland

== Economy and infrastructure ==
In Haßloch, the majority of the resident industry is in metalworking. This is shown in the three major production companies in Haßloch (Ardagh Group, Gottlieb Duttenhöfer GmbH and Dinex Deutschland GmbH).

In Haßloch stands one of the world's biggest and most modern drink can factories, Ardagh Group. Among other things, the first half-litre can (a beer can) was made in Haßloch.

Haßloch, along with the neighbouring municipality of Böhl-Iggelheim, is also home to one of the 28 “open channels” in Rhineland-Palatinate. This regional broadcaster allows communal coverage by citizens for citizens.

=== Haßloch as a test market ===
Haßloch is a test market for new brandname items and consumer products: at Haßloch retailers’ shops, products are available in advance that are only to be introduced into the rest of Germany in the future. On the local cable television network, specially made commercials for these products are shown, and individual newspapers (such as Hörzu and Bunte) are published for Haßloch with special advertisements for the new products. Moreover, some citizens hold cards with barcodes that can be scanned with every purchase so that an individual household's shopping habits can be tracked.

The Gesellschaft für Konsumforschung (“Company for Consumer Research”, GfK) can thereby tell how tested products are being received by customers. The research that the GfK does here matches later market data with an accuracy of 90%.

Haßloch was chosen because it exhibits a population structure that, by various criteria, comes quite close to the German average, such as in its age structure and social classes. Haßloch's structure is also midway between a town and a village.

=== Transport ===
Haßloch has at its disposal good transport links towards the region's centre (Mannheim/Ludwigshafen/Heidelberg), be it by Autobahn A 65 or the RheinNeckar S-Bahn. S-Bahn lines S1, S2 – and mornings and evenings S3 and S4 – run every 30 minutes during peak times from Haßloch station.

=== Public institutions ===
Available weekdays to Haßloch's citizens is the citizens’ office for all questions and applications.

=== Education ===
Given its size, Haßloch can be said to have many educational institutions.

- Primary schools:
  - Ernst-Reuter-Schule
  - Schiller-Schule
- Secondary schools:
  - Kurpfalzschule-Hauptschule
  - Sophie-Scholl-Realschule
  - Hannah-Arendt-Gymnasium
- Special schools:
  - Gottlieb-Wenz-Schule, a school whose focus is on learning
- Other scholastic institutions:
  - Folk high school
  - Music school

== Notable people ==
=== Sons and daughters of the town ===
- Theo Becker (1927–2006), oenologist, for three decades Grand Master of the Wine Brotherhood of the Palatinate
- Jakob Klaus (1788–1855), barber and compiler of memoirs about his participation in the Peninsular War
- Eduard Ohlinger (1967–2004), weightlifter and Olympian

=== Famous people associated with the municipality ===
- Johann Michael Hartung (1708–1763), master organ builder, built the organ in Haßloch in 1751
