= Gisa Flake =

German actress

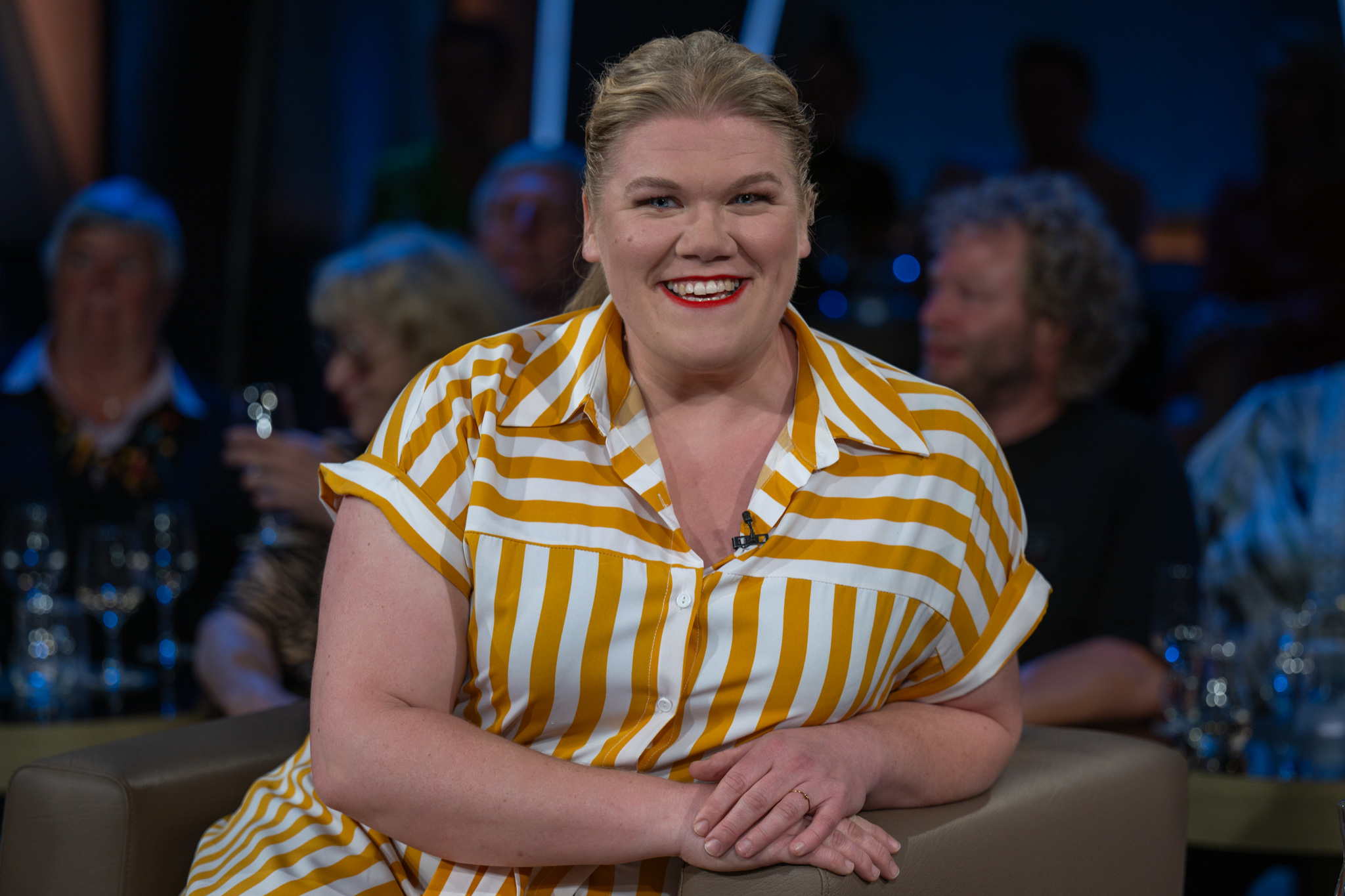
Gisa Flake (2023)

Gisa Flake (born 10 October 1985) is a German actress, singer and cabaret artist.

== Life ==
Gisela "Gisa" Flake was born in Braunschweig, at that time close to the border that divided the two German states. Even before leaving school, she had appeared on the cabaret stage in Braunschweig, in various shows such as "Geben sie acht! – Die Georg Kreisler-Revue" ("Watch out! – The Georg Kreisler Review").

She concluded her school career, passing her school final exams (Abitur) at the IGS:FF school in Braunschweig, and went on to study drama in Munich at the Bayerische Theaterakademie August Everding. That led to her degree in acting, which she received in 2010. Since then she has appeared in a range of film, television and theatre productions, sung in blues and soul bands, and featured in cabaret productions.

Her film debut came in 2009 with her appearance in the action-comedy Vicky the Viking as the wife of Tjure (played by Nic Romm). She took the same role two years later in the sequel, Vicky and the Treasure of the Gods.

In 2009 she won the Bundeswettbewerb singing contest's category "Musical/Chanson" and went on a national tour with a programme entitled Ich glaub, ’ne Dame werd ich nie (loosely: I believe I were never no lady). In 2010 she featured as Tanya Gleason in Simon Stephens' production, Punk Rock when it came to the Deutsches Schauspielhaus (theatre) in Hamburg. She was in Tobias Ginsburg's "Radikal. Monument der Verwesung" (Radical. Monument of decay) at the i-camp/Neues Theater in Munich in 2014. Her new cabaret programme Scham & Schande followed in 2015.

For the television sitcom Bully macht Buddy she returned in 2013 to a working partnership with Michael Herbig. She took on a main role alongside Rick Kavanian and Herbig himself. That was transmitted in November/December 2013 across Germany on the ProSieben channel. In 2015 she appeared alongside Jürgen Vogel in the ZDF thriller series Blochin – The living and the dead.
