= Studio 100 Animation =

French animation studio

Studio 100 Animation SAS
- Logo used since 2016
- Type: Division
- Industry: Animation
- Founded: February 12, 2009; 17 years ago
- Headquarters: Paris, France
- Key people: Katell France (managing director); Emmanuelle Chabord (CFO / COO); Jérôme Mouscadet (creative director)
- Products: Television; Films
- Parent: Studio 100 Media

Studio 100 Animation SAS is a French animation studio based in Paris and it is a subsidiary of the Belgian Studio 100 group, the studio specialises in producing TV series and films for children and families.

== History ==
When parent company Studio 100 acquired EM.Sport Media AG's German entertainment division EM.Entertainment and its library along with the latter's Australian entertainment & animation production studio Flying Bark Productions and their German television channel JuniorTV (which Studio 100 would eventually close in 2022) for €41 million on May 30 2008 one year before the launch of Studio 100 Animation, it expanded Studio 100's children's entertainment library with Studio 100 taken over EM.Entertainment's Australian entertainment and animation production studio as their own in-house animation production studio outside of Belgium along with EM.Entertainment's distribution library including Yoram Gross's animated productions the library of Japanese animation studio Zuiyo which had them placed under Studio 100's global distribution division Studio 100 Media. Following Studio 100's acquisition of the EM.Entertainment library, they wanted to capitalize on their acquired EM.Entertainment's classic property as their new properties by announcing that they're adapting new versions of old classics like Maya the Bee and Vic the Viking for the new generation.

Therefore on February 12 2009, Studio 100's German distribution division Studio 100 Media announced the founding of Studio 100's new fully owned in-house animation studio based in Paris, France outside of their parent company's origin of Belgium in order for them to launch their new adaptations of their acquired classic properties such as Maya the Bee and Vic the Viking alongside producing their own original animation productions named Studio 100 Animation and was chosen over a Belgian one, because the animation industry in France is subsidised and therefore it was more cost-effective to produce them in France with the new studio hiring Jo Harris to head Studio 100's in-house French animation division Studio 100 Animation as MD while former Alphanim creative producers Jan Van Rijsselberge & Djamila Missoum had joined Studio 100 Animation as creative officer and line producer, as Studio 100 Animation had assumed production of two animated series from its parent Studio 100, which are Super Mega Hyper Pets, a series co-produced Toronto-based Canadian animation production studio & entertainment company Amberwood Entertainment, and Rescue 4U , a series co-produced by Irish entertainment company & animation alum Magma Films.; the former series would later be upgraded into a CGI-animated series with Studio 100's Australian entertainment/animation production subsidiary Flying Bark Productions would join the series as a co-producer for the series with Australian television broadcasting network ABC and French preschool TV channel Tiji ordering the series, for it to be broadcast in Australia and France, but the series was never produced.

In 2012, Studio 100 Animation opened a Licensing and Merchandising office in Paris in order to manage their properties in France.

In October 2015, Studio 100 Animation had teamed up with Europacorp Television, the television division of Luc Besson's production outfit Europacorp to develop & produce an animated series named Arthur and the Minimoys - The Series based on Luc Besson's book series and the live-action/CGI franchise, with Gulli and Canal J commissioned the series whilst Studio 100's German distribution unit Studio 100 Media would handle distribution for the series except for Italy, German and French-speaking territores.

In June 2020, Studio 100 Animation announced that its CFO/CTO/COO Emmanuelle Chabord, creative producer/art director Jérôme Mouscadet, CTO/technical director Quentin Auger, line producer Jean-François Ramos, head of software engineering Jonathan Giroux, lead scriptwriter/editorial director Sophie Decroisette, CG supervisor/DCD Fabrice Delapierre had depatured Studio 100 Media's French animation production alum Studio 100 Animation and had founded a new Paris-based independent French CGI animation production company Hue Dada! Productions.

== Filmography ==
A list of all series and films produced by Studio 100 Animation.

=== TV series ===
Title	Years	Network	Notes
Maya the Bee	2012–2017	TF1 & Canal J/Gulli & Tiji; ZDF (Germany)	Based on the book series by Waldemar Bonsels
Vic the Viking	2013–2014	TF1; ZDF (Germany); Network Ten/Eleven (Australia); ABC3 (Australia)	co-production with Flying Bark Productions and ASE Studios; Based on the 1974 series of the same name and the book series Vicke Viking by Runer Jonsson
K3	2014–2015	M6 & Canal+ Family	co-production with Studio 100 and Toon Factory
Heidi	2015–2019	TF1; Tiji/Piwi+ ZDF (Germany); Nine Network (Australia)	co-production with Flying Bark Productions (season 1) and Heidi Productions (season 1); Based on the novel Heidi by Johanna Spyri
Arthur and the Minimoys	2017–2018	Canal J, Gulli & Tiji; OUFtivi (Belgium); Disney Channel Germany (Germany); Radio-Canada (Canada); RTS (Switzerland)	co-production with Europacorp Television and RTBF; Based on the movie of the same name by Luc Besson
Nils Holgersson	2017	BR (Germany)	co-production with Studio 100, AA Studio and ARD; Based on the novel by Selma Lagerlöf
Galactic Agency	2022	Gulli & Canal J Ketnet (Belgium)	co-production with Cosmos-Maya and Bardaf! Productions

=== Feature films ===
Title	Release date	Distributor	Notes
Vic the Viking and the Magic Sword	18 December 2019 (France); 2 September 2021 (Germany)	SND Films; Leonine Distribution (Germany)	co-production with Studio 100 Film, Studio 100 Media, Belvision, SND Films and ZDF; A feature-length movie adaptation based on the television series and the books by Studio 100 and Runer Jonsson

== Sister studios ==
Studio 100 Animation isn't the only animation studio of the Studio 100 Group. They also own Flying Bark Productions in Sydney & Los Angeles, Terribly Terrific! Productions in New York City and Studio Isar Animation in Munich. The latter is owned via the German subsidiary Studio 100 Media.
