= Vicky the Viking =

Animated television series

- Japanese cover art of the series DVD release
- 小さなバイキング ビッケ
- Type: TV series
- Based on: Vicke Viking by Runer Jonsson
- Directed by: Hiroshi Saitô (chief)
- Series composition: Yuji Tano
- Character designer: Shuichi Seki
- Music by: Seiichiro Uno
- Country of origin: West Germany; Japan
- Original language: Japanese
- No. of episodes: 78

Production
- Zuiyo Eizo (1–52); Nippon Animation (53–78); Fuji Television; TaurusFilm

Original release
- Networks: ORF FS1 (Austria); ZDF (West Germany); FNS (Fuji TV) (Japan)
- Release: January 31, 1974 – April 8, 1976

Vicky the Viking, known as Wickie und die starken Männer in Germany and Austria and Chiisana Viking Bikke (小さなバイキング ビッケ) in Japan, is a German-Japanese animated television series which tells the adventures of Vicky, a young Viking boy who uses his wits to help his Viking fellows. It is based on the novel Vicke Viking (1963) written by the Swedish author Runer Jonsson. It premiered on the German TV channel ZDF on 31 January 1974 and aired in various countries. In 2013, Studio 100 produced a computer animated television adaptation of the anime.

== Plot ==
Vicky is a small boy with shoulder-length reddish-blonde hair who lives with his parents Ylva and Halvar, the latter being the chief of the small village of Flake. Vicky is not a typical Viking boy, being naturally fearful and not particularly strong, but he impresses with his pronounced intelligence, with which he regularly supports adults and friends in seemingly hopeless situations and helps them find a solution. Together with Halvar and his ship's crew of more or less strong men, Vicky experiences dangerous and humorous adventures each episode. Initially he must assert himself against the crew's skepticism, but he quickly develops into an essential figure whom the Vikings cannot go without.

== Cast ==
- Yōko Kuri (Japanese version), Florian Halm (German version), Sally Daykin (English version) as Vicky, the titular character, a boy of about nine years of age. He is physically frail, timid and has a special fear of wolves, but his brains eventually help him solve any problem with which he is confronted.
- Kōsei Tomita (Japanese version), Walter Reichelt (German version), John Boyle (English version) as Halvar, Vicky's father and chief of Flake. He is rather braggish warrior, who prefers to solve problems with brawns, but who has since learned to listen to and value Vicky's ideas.
- Taeko Nakanishi (Japanese version), Inge Schulz (German version), Cicely Sandford (English version) as Ylva, Vicky's mother, who is far more supportive of her son's intelligence than his father is.
- Yoneko Matsukane (Japanese version), Alexandra Ludwig and Christa Häussler (German version) as Ylvie ("Ticky" in the U.K. version), a young girl in Flake who is Vicky's neighbour and most ardent supporter. In the German film adaptation this adoration is portrayed as a childhood crush.
- Junko Hori (Japanese version), Horst Abraham (German version) as Gilby, the strongest boy in Flake and Vicky's ambitious prime rival in his age, though a terrible rascal and intellectually clearly Vicky's inferior.
- Takashi Satomi and Junpei Takiguchi (Japanese version), Werner Abrolat and Eberhard Storeck (German version), Derek Moloughney and Bob Steen (English version) as Tjure and Snorre, two Vikings in Halvar's crew who constantly quarrel about something.
- Kōichi Kitamura (Japanese version), Leo Bardischewski (German version), John Sanford (English version) as Urobe, the village druid and oldest Viking in Halvar's crew. While he is rather old and not as imaginative as Vicky, he is quite knowledgeable in sagas and legend lore, and he is respected as a fair judge and mediator.
- Shun Yashiro (Japanese version), Manfred Lichtenfeld (German version), Cliff Kunstler (English version) as Gorm, a rather over-excited fellow among the Flake Vikings who occupies the position of the lookout on Halvar's ship.
- Setsuo Wakui (Japanese version), Kurt Zips and Bruno W. Pantel (German version), Michael Bell (English version) as Ulme, the village bard, a rather neat person and poetic soul, who carries a harp to play on joyous occasions, alas invariably wasted on his Nordic barbarian audience.
- Toku Nishio (Japanese version), Gernot Duda (German version), Mike Morris (English version) as Faxe, the biggest and strongest, but also the slowest, of Flake's Vikings who enjoys a close big-brother relationship with Vicky.
- Masayuki Katō and Chikao Ohtsuka (Japanese version), Kurt E. Ludwig, Wolfgang Hess and Achim Strietzel (German version) as Sven the Terrible, a vicious Viking pirate captain, who does not hesitate robbing even his fellow Vikings of their hard-earned plunder.
- Hannes Gromball (German version) as Pokka, Sven's devious second-in-command.

== Production ==
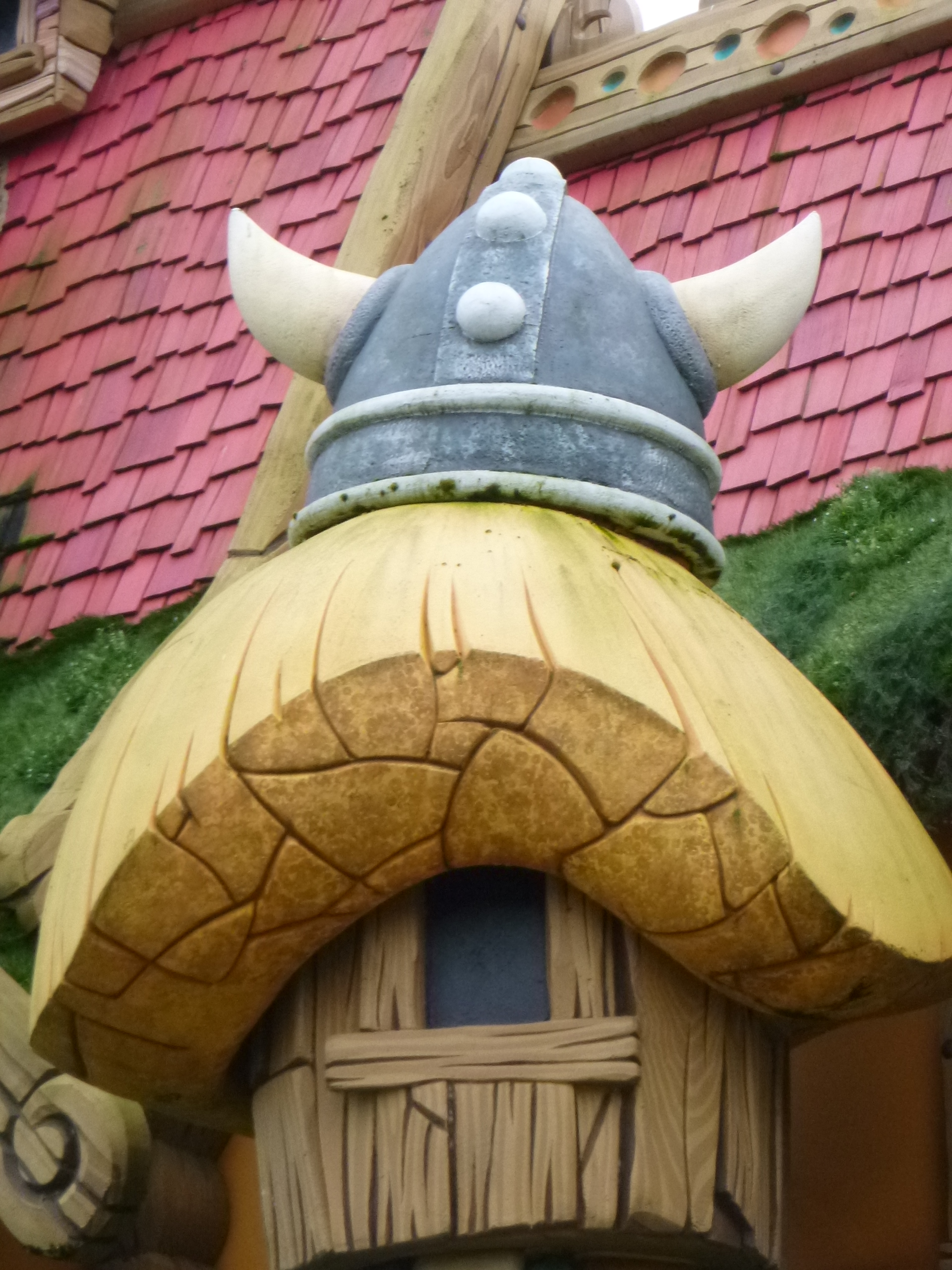
Vickyland at Plopsaland Belgium

The script was developed from the children's book Vicke Viking (1963) written by the Swedish author Runer Jonsson, who won the Deutscher Jugendliteraturpreis (German Children's Book Award) for it in 1965. The Japanese animation studio Zuiyo Enterprise Company (from which Nippon Animation was formed) adapted the original version (1972–1974) and developed from it an 85-minute-long film (original title: Chiisana Baikingu Bikke) as well as the series with 78 episodes, each 25 minutes long. The animation of the first episodes was commissioned by Zuiyo Eizo to Mushi Production, directed by Chikao Katsui. Following the failure of the latter, Zuiyo Eizo continued the production of the series and hired director Hiroshi Saitô. Later Zuiyo Eizo was split into Zuiyo and Nippon Animation, the latter studio who completed the rest of the episodes with director Kōzō Kusuba, while Zuiyo maintained the rights to the series (copyright has been registered in 1972).

A German dubbing of the series was made by Eberhard Storeck, who spoke as one of the characters (Snorre) himself. The music in the German version was composed by Christian Bruhn and Karel Svoboda. The text of the title song (Hey, hey, Wickie! Hey, Wickie, hey! ...) was written by Andrea Wagner. The German version also features new brief portions of animation. The English dubbing was largely poor, with characters talking endlessly to fit the lip movements of the characters, not pausing for a breath or using verbal punctuation. In the years that followed this was not uncommon for some voice actors who dubbed Japanese-produced series, up to the 1990s' anime boom in the West.

The series was produced for the German TV network ZDF and Austrian TV network ORF. In the United Kingdom, it was shown on ITV.

== Other adaptations ==
=== TV remake ===
A modern television 'remake', entitled Vic the Viking, was released in 2013 and was produced by Studio 100 Animation.

=== Cancelled live-action TV adaptation ===
A live-action remake of the anime series was announced in 2018, when Belgian production company Studio 100, under its German distribution division Studio 100 Media and its brand management and media subsidiary m4e (whom Studio 100 Media had brought a majority stake in 2017), had teamed up with German film and television production studio Rat Pack Filmproduktion (who previously produced two live-action films Vicky the Viking and its sequel Vicky and the Treasure of the Gods) to produce a TV adaptation of the series. Ulli Stoef, CEO & president of m4e and Studio 100 Media, and Rat Pack executive producer Christian Becker were attached as co-producers. No production news of the project were provided after its initial announcement.

=== Film adaptations ===
A feature-length film edited from episodes of the animated series was released in West Germany on March 24, 1978.

German director Michael "Bully" Herbig filmed a live action adaptation of the series called Vicky the Viking. It was produced by Christian Becker of Rat Pack Filmproduktion and released by Constantin Film. Vicky is portrayed by Jonas Hämmerle, while Günther Kaufmann portrays Sven, the antagonist of the Vikings. The Vikings of Flake are portrayed by Jörg Moukkadam (Faxe), Mike Maas (Gorm), Christian Koch (Snorre), Nic Romm (Tjure), Patrick Reichel (Ulme) and Olaf Krätke (Urobe).

The film premiered on 9 September 2009, in Munich. On its opening weekend, it grossed approximately $5,595,895. On 3 October, during a show of Wetten, dass..?, Herbig was presented with the Goldene Leinwand award for the film's viewership of three million within its first 18 weeks. The film sold nearly 5 million tickets in Germany, for a total gross revenue of approximately $40,582,384.

Following the success of the first film, a sequel, Vicky and the Treasure of the Gods, was released on 29 September 2011.

Studio 100 Animation and Studio 100 Film produced a CGI-animated film adaptation of the 1974 anime, titled Vic the Viking: The Movie (also known as Vic the Viking and the Magic Sword), which was released on December 8, 2019. Belgian animation studio DreamWall provided animation services. German film production and distribution company Universum Film distributed the film in Germany while Studio 100 Film handled international distribution rights.

== Legacy ==
- Christian Lorenz, keyboardist of the industrial metal band Rammstein took his nickname ("Flake") from the village of the same name in Vicky the Viking, which he watched as a child.
- Japanese manga artist Eiichiro Oda was heavily influenced by the program, which led him to serialize One Piece in Shueisha's Weekly Shōnen Jump anthology magazine starting in 1997.
- Japanese manga artist Makoto Yukimura has cited Vicky the Viking as an inspiration for his series Vinland Saga, particularly in the case of the character Hild.

== VHS release (United Kingdom) ==
- In the UK on 14 May 1990, Video Collection International Ltd released a single video cassette of Vicky The Viking (Cat. No. VC1177) with the first two episodes that were "The Contest" and "The Trap" and it was re-released on 22 July 1991 in Video Collection International Ltd's "Children's Club" range of kids tiles (Cat. No. KK0013).

== Primary literature (German) ==
- Runer Jonsson: Wickie und die starken Männer, München: Herold, 1964.
- Runer Jonsson: Wickie und die Blauschwerter, München: Herold, 1966.
- Runer Jonsson: Wickie und die großen Drachen, München: Herold, 1967.
- Runer Jonsson: Wickie und die Rothäute, Ravensburg: Ravensburger, 1984. ISBN 3-473-38776-2
- Runer Jonsson: Wickie und das hölzerne Pferd, Ravensburg: Ravensburger, 1984. ISBN 3-473-38791-6
- Runer Jonsson: Wickie und die Stadt der Tyrannen, Ravensburg: Ravensburger, 1984. ISBN 3-473-38822-X

== Secondary literature (German) ==
- Ina Kurth/Joachim Schmaeck: Wickie und der dänische Zoll. Arbeiten mit Anteilen und Prozenten, Appelhülsen/Mülheim: Verlag "Die Schulpraxis", 1990 (ISBN 3-927279-64-1)
- Susanne Pauser/Wolfgang Ritschl: Wickie, Slime und Paiper, Wien: Böhlau Verlag, 1999 (ISBN 3-205-98989-9)
- Wickie und die starken Männer, Kinderkochbuch, Frechen: Schwager & Steinlein, 2001 (ISBN 3-89600-450-6)
- Wickie und die starken Männer - Pop-Up Masken Spielbuch, Frechen: Schwager & Steinlein, 2003 (ISBN 3-89600-554-5)
- Wickie und die starken Männer - Geschichtenbuch, Fränkisch-Crumbach: Verlag EDITION XXL, 2003 (ISBN 3-89736-417-4)
- Wickie - Stanzpappe Buch, Fränkisch-Crumbach: Verlag EDITION XXL, 2004 (ISBN 3-89736-652-5)
