= Futur3 =

The independent theater collective Futur3 was founded in 2003 in Cologne by actors André Erlen, Stefan H. Kraft, and Klaus Maria Zehe. Additionally, musician Mariana Sadovska and author and dramaturge Klaus Fehling have been involved in almost all of the group's productions.

The plays are often developed through improvisations based on documentary material and autobiographical elements from the participants, tailored for performance venues in public spaces. Authors are integrated into the work (and the ensemble) through commissioned writing tasks.

Futur3 is a founding member of the Freihandelszone Ensemblenetzwerk Köln and has achieved regional and international recognition through various festival participations and collaborations. The world premiere of the play Raumung in der Stadt by Claudia Klischat was nominated for the Theaterzwang – Festival of Independent Theater NRW in 2006. The production Vater.Mutter.Hund. (2007) was invited to the Theaterzwang Festival in 2008 and received nominations for the Cologne Dance and Theater Prize, along with productions like Eine Nacht in Afghanistan (2010) and Petersberg 1. The latter won both the Cologne Theater Prize and the Kurt Hackenberg Prize for Political Theater in 2010.

In 2016, Futur3 received the 27th Cologne Dance and Theater Prize, endowed with €10,000, for its three-part project Der unbekannte Nachbar, which addresses anonymous deaths in metropolitan areas.

At the Kölner Kulturpreis 2022, the jury introduced a special award, the "Initiative Ukraine," due to the war in Ukraine. Futur3 was honored for its project "Art against War" and its support for the Ukrainian art scene and Ukrainian artists.

== Productions ==
- 2004: CITYBEATS VOL. 1, Seven theatrical miniatures at various locations in Cologne.
- 2005: CITYBEATS VOL. 2, Three world premieres:
  - Gerichtet in der Stadt by Klaus Fehling (Director: Marcel Keller).
  - Alt in der Stadt by Sabine Schiffner.
  - Raumung in der Stadt by Claudia Klischat.
- 2006: Der Duft, das Geld und die Stadt, in collaboration with Bühnen der Stadt Köln.
- 2007: Vater.Mutter.Hund, in collaboration with the Max-Planck-Institut für Gesellschaftsforschung, Cologne (Director: Hiltrud Kissel).
- 2008: Im Keller der Erinnerung, in collaboration with 14 Cologne archives at the Historical Archive of the Archdiocese of Cologne.
- 2008: Kellerleichen, Cologne.
- 2008: Masterplan, cultural program for the presentation of Cologne's architectural master plan.
- 2009: Was interessiert mich mein Geschwätz von gestern?, Cologne.
- 2010: Petersberg 1 – Ein Verhandlungssache über das Land, das Meer, die Heiligtümer und den Wunsch nach Frieden, Cologne.
- 2010: Eine Nacht in Afghanistan, Cologne.
