= Heidi (2015 TV series) =

2015 animated television series

- Title card
- Also known as: Heidi 3D
- Genre: Animation; Adventure; Drama; Historical
- Created by: Jan Van Rijsselberge (of the series itself); Christel Gonnard (writing bible); Johanna Spyri (base novel)
- Based on: Heidi by Johanna Spyri
- Written by: Laurent Auclair; Christel Gonnard; Jean-Rémi François; Sophie Decroisette (participating writer) and twelve others
- Directed by: Jerome Mouscadet
- Theme music composer: Music: Johan Vanden Eede; Lyrics: Gert Verhulst; Hans Bourlon; Alain Vande Putte
- Opening theme: "Heidi" (the name of both theme songs)
- Composers: David Vadant; Romain Allender; Patrick Sigwalt
- Countries of origin: France; Belgium; Australia
- Original language: English
- No. of seasons: 2
- No. of episodes: 65

Production
- Producers: Katell France; Jim Ballantine (season 1)
- Running time: 21 minutes (approx. per episode)
- Production companies: Studio 100 Animation; Flying Bark Productions (season 1); Heidi Productions Pty. Limited

Original release
- Network: ZDF (Germany); TF1 (TFOU) (France)
- Release: January 11, 2015 – 2020

Heidi is an animated children's television series, based on the 1881 novel Heidi by Johanna Spyri.

A "remake" (rather than a re-telling) of Heidi, Girl of the Alps, much of the story is the same; the titular character is a then-eight-year-old girl, who is taken to her grandfather on the Swiss Alps by her aunt Dete to live with him and while the girl ends up improving his life, she also befriends Peter, the goatherd of the village Dorfli below and the one who causes her to find a big passion of hers, goats and other animals in general.

In this version, there is also a trio, Karl, Theresa, and William, who usually try to do something that would degrade Peter, whom they often refer to as a mountain goat, in some way or another. In the first winter up there, a letter is eventually gotten and what results from there will end up changing another's life, as well.

The series has been distributed in 138 countries around the world.

A second season had been released in 2019 with Studio 100's Australian animation studio Flying Bark Productions dropping out of the series and a different voice cast, similar to Studio 100 Animation's other animated series Maya the Bee.

== Characters ==
The actors cited are from the English cast.

=== Meier family ===
- Adelaide "Heidi" Meier (voiced by Monique Hore) is the titular character, an 8-year-old cute and innocent orphan girl who is taken to her grandfather, like the base series and novel. She loves her family and her friends so much.
- Ernst Meier (voiced by Peter McAllum) is Heidi's grandfather, a gentle and but slightly grumpy old man who works as a carpenter. Nicknamed the "Alps Uncle", he owns Little Bear and Little Swan, and later Snowdrop after Little Swan dies in the season 2 episode "Goodbye Little Swan". After a fall in season 2, Ernst starts having trouble doing his work. After an accident with Heidi near the Meier Bridge (formerly the Devil's Bridge), Ernst decides to go to Frankfurt to see Dr. Beckmann, who recommends a surgery which he takes after talking with Frieda.
- Joseph is Heidi's grandfather's Saint Bernard dog.
- Caruso is Heidi's grandmother's Bulldog.
- Chippy is goldfinch that Heidi takes in after it has been attacked by a predator. He leaves for warmer places, like Africa, during winter, but always comes back in the spring.
- Tobias Meier is Heidi's deceased father, who never finished building the Devil's Bridge over a mountain gap he and his father Ernst Meier/ Heidi's grandfather worked on.
- Adelaide Meier is Heidi's deceased mother, and Dete's older sister.
- Anna Meier is Heidi's grandmother and Ernst's wife. She disappeared in a shipwreck off the coast of Salerno, Italy before Heidi was born. It is later revealed that she woke up in a hospital in Sicily, having no memory of her family in Dorfli, and grew up as the Countess Alice di Burgo, the widow of Count di Burgo from Salerno, Italy, looking after the hospital and an orphanage. After spending time in Dorfli, Anna's memories soon return. She decides to stay with Ernst as Heidi is enrolled in a school in Zurich.
- Aunt Dete (voiced by Beth Armstrong) is Heidi's maternal aunt who forcibly leaves Heidi with her grandfather and shows saccharine self-righteousness with those around her, including her own niece. She works as a partly cooking maid in the Sesemann household, with butler Sebastian who she eventually falls in love with and marries, though where is not actually specified.

=== Bendorf family ===
- Peter Bendorf (voiced by Nicole Shostak) is an 11 year old goatherd and Heidi's best friend. He owns the goat Goldfinch, who becomes a mother to baby Mischief. He reunites with his father, Anton Bendorf, while in Frankfurt in season 2.
- Bridget (voiced by Beth Armstrong) is Peter's mother. Together with her mother, Susanne, she made up the story about Peter's father being a man from Spain named Pablo who died in a war to protect Peter.
- Anton Bendorf is Peter's father, who is watchmaker from Frankfurt and the owner of Bendorf's Watchmakers. Even though he was already married, he fell in love with Bridget. Years later, his wife got sick and died, and he closed his shop for lack of customers.
- Susanne (voiced by Beth Armstrong) is Peter's blind grandmother and Bridget's mother.

=== Traber family ===
- Karl Traber (voiced by Jamie Croft) is the leader of Theresa and William's gang. He is an adventurer and treasure hunter, who likes to collect valuable things such as fossils, semi-precious stones and insects. He was Peter's friend, but something made them part. He used to call Peter "Billy Goat" until an incident where he saved Karl's life.
- Mr. Traber is Karl's father is the school teacher. He and Karl move to Maienfield before Clara's visit. Mr. Traber returned in season 2, but Karl's fate is not specified.

=== Keller family ===
- Theresa Keller (voiced by Charlotte Hamlyn) owns the goat Sweetheart. Theresa is usually jealous, conceited, and mean to Heidi and Peter, along with Karl and William, but accepts them in episode 33 with Clara and starts to be much nicer, until season 2.
- Johann Keller (voiced by Peter McAllum, Jamie Croft) is Dorfli's grocer, Theresa's father, and Alda's husband.
- Alda Keller (voiced by Nicole Shostak) is Theresa's snobby mother and Johann's wife. She is less reasonable than Johann, as she only cares about money, her pride and her family.

=== Hopfer family ===
- William Hopfer (voiced by Jamie Croft) is a short and obese member of the trio-turned-duo, tends to be distracted by thoughts of food, gets easily filled with fear, and has a goat owned by his own family (Pie). He is revealed to have found a fox he named Flame.
- Barbel Hopfer (voiced by Kate Fitzpatrick) is a friend of Dete's, and William's mother.
- Hans Hopfer is Barbel's husband, the village blacksmith, and William's father.

=== Sesemann family ===
- Clara Sesemann (voiced by Sophia Morrison) is the 12-year-old daughter of Friedrich Sesemann and Constance Sesemann. She is a sweet rich girl who used to be in a wheelchair, but in episode 37 she starts walking for the first time. As of season 2, Clara takes up ballet with Susanne Linke as her teacher.
- Friedrich Sesemann (voiced by Peter McAllum) is Clara's father and Constance's husband. He married Constance on his wedding just before Clara was born. In season 2, he is revealed to be in love with an American woman named Elizabeth. He was angry with Clara sometimes in both episode 14 and 15, but when Clara got upset, he reconciles with Clara with help from Heidi.
- Constance Sesemann is Clara's late mother and Mr. Sesemann's wife and the late Mrs. Sesemann. She is said to have been a great ballerina. When Clara was a little girl, her mother took her to the Park along with her father. Clara took her first steps in the park when she was a baby. Her father was proud of her progress. Before she died, she asked her husband to watch over her daughter always so that Clara will have a new mother after her death and asks her husband if she could hold her little girl one last time before she goes to heaven.
- Grandmamma Sesemann (voiced by Penny Cook) is Clara's kind and youthful grandmother. She is an actress in the theatre. She only made an appearance in Season 2, Episode 2, but is mentioned by Clara in "The Matchmakers".
- Miss Vera Rottenmeier (voiced by Beth Armstrong) is the Sesemann household's strict governess, who has an overblown worry of Clara's health, focus on the kids' education and reactions towards animals (though whom she has an allergy of), highly conformist and attentively enforcing of it, the most on "Adelaide" (Heidi), and refuses other's opinions more often than not, in useless stubbornness. Eventually, she comes to view Heidi as a friend as well as Clara's.
- Sebastian (voiced by Jamie Croft) is the Sesemann household's butler who falls in love with Aunt Dete.
- Elizabeth is a Texan woman Friedrich Sesemann met in the United States. She becomes Friedrich's fiancé in season 2. She declares that as soon as she and Friedrich get married, they will get babies, but Clara dislikes Elizabeth. Clara is upset that if she leaves Frankfurt, she will never see her friend Heidi again, but Friedrich comforts Clara by telling her that he loves her. Elizabeth asks a stranger to buy some ballet tickets for Clara and Friedrich Sesemann to have their first Dance at the Ballet Academy. Friedrich asks his daughter to be his escort at the dance.

=== Lamfredi family ===
- Rico Lamfredi is a 7-year-old boy from Puglia, Italy whom Heidi and Ernst take in. He is revealed to be a skilled violinist and can craft wooden sculptures really well.
- Francesco Lamfredi is Rico's father. His late wife was named Stella. Originally wanting to go to Marseille in France, he and Rico settle in Dörfli.
- Flavio is Francesco's donkey.

=== Other characters ===
- Hans Bakker is a home-school teacher who excessively punishes Heidi for her confusions and whose own teaching method includes torture, involving holding heavy books, which gets him fired from teaching at the Sesemann Household.
- Ticket inspector is a friendly and helpful train attendant.
- Rudy is a boy in Frankfurt who plays a barrel organ in the street. He is a friend of Clara and Heidi, and the owner of two kittens, Socks and Star.
- Park ranger: True to his title, he is a park ranger who is too keen on his flowers and doesn't take care of the animals at the park.
- Dr. Beckmann is the Sesemann family doctor, and helps Ernst Meier with an operation in season 2.
- Mr. Dinkelmann: In one episode (A Tree for Shelter), he came to the Sesemann's house to be regarding an adoption for Heidi to be Clara's sister, though it did not succeed.
- Friedrich is Miss Vera Rottenmeier's old friend from Auringen, near Frankfurt.
- Henry Mason is a man from Liverpool, England who comes to Dorfli. It is eventually revealed that he was after quartz crystals on the White Peak. His actions cause an avalanche that destroys the chalet in the mountains, but is later caught by Grandfather, Heidi and Rico while Mr. Mason tries to escape back to England. Mr. Mason is arrested and Grandfather and Francesco rebuilt the chalet.
- Susanne Linke is Clara's ballet instructor.
- Frieda: An orphaned girl Dr. Beckmann once treated, she works for her landlady to hopefully bring her little brother Ulrich to live with her. Because she has never been to school, she never learned to read. Thanks to Heidi though, she managed to learn. On Christmas Eve, Frieda reunites with Ulrich at the Sesemann Household. Ulrich's foster parents agree to adopt Frieda as well and are impatient to meet her.
- Ulrich is Frieda's little brother.
- Frau Decker is Frieda's cruel landlady.
- Alfredo is Countess di Burgo's caretaker. When Grandfather walks in the Frankfurt Park with Heidi after his operation, he finds a woman with Alfredo whom he thinks is his wife Anna. He chases "Anna" but the lady ignores him. Heartbroken, grandfather faints in the park and Heidi begs for him to wake up.
- Fritz Newman is a man from Frankfurt in charge of the clock at the library. He tried to sabotage Anton Bendorf's work on the clock. Fritz calls a policeman and accuses Anton of ruining the clock, but thanks to Frieda's evidence, the policeman arrests Fritz Newman and it is unknown what happens to him after that.
- Helmut is a boy living under Frau Decker.

== Episode list ==
=== Season 1 ===
1. Up to the Mountain
2. First Day in the Mountains
3. The Challenge
4. Save Chippy
5. The Treehouse Oath
6. A Night Out
7. For a Loaf of Bread
8. Trapped in the Manor
9. Beware of the Wolf
10. Peter's Treasure
11. Attack the Treehouse!
12. Save Sweetheart
13. The End of Spring
14. Clara
15. The Bell Tower
16. The Promise
17. Papa Returns
18. Home Schooled
19. Let's Make a Show
20. At the Park
21. Clara Stands
22. Goats in the City
23. The Resignation
24. A Tree for Shelter
25. The Ghost
26. The Letter
27. Back to Dörfli
28. A New Goat in the Herd
29. The Broken Statue
30. The Brooch
31. The School Test
32. Scavenger Hunt
33. Goat's Hour
34. The Storm
35. The Devil's Bridge
36. Friedrich
37. The Wheelchair
38. Forgiven
39. The Edelweiss

=== Season 2 ===
Dubbed "Heidi: New Adventures" on Netflix.

1. My Best Friend
2. Goodbye Little Swan
3. Rico
4. The Hike
5. The Competition
6. Bridget's Secret
7. The Violin
8. Francesco
9. The Watch
10. The Resolution
11. The Choice
12. The Operation
13. The Lady in Red
14. The Matchmakers
15. A Marriage is Announced
16. Reunited
17. A Question of Time
18. Under the Christmas Tree
19. The Cabin
20. The Endangered Mountain
21. The Accident
22. The Wolpertinger
23. Anna
24. The Beehives
25. A Tough Break
26. A Difficult Choice

== Production ==
In 2008, Belgian entertainment company Studio 100 and its German distribution arm Studio 100 Media acquired EM.Sport Media AG's entertainment division EM.Entertainment and its library including the original 1977 anime series Heidi, as Studio 100 was planning to reboot the original series for modern audiences.

The production of the new series started in late 2012. Studio 100 collaborated with Austrian broadcaster ORF, who ordered a CGI-animated adaptation of the 1977 anime while the French animation production division Studio 100 Animation (who previously developed reboots of both Maya the Bee and Vic the Viking) produced the series alongside Australian production subsidiary Flying Bark Productions and specifically-made subsidiary Heidi Pyl. A German-based distribution division Studio 100 Media handled distribution rights for this series. German broadcaster ZDF later joined to the series' production. Australian broadcasting network Nine Network bought the rights to air the series in Australia.

Due to the partnership of Eurovision Fiction, the series was sent to their affiliated countries, including Ireland, Norway, Cyprus (in Greek dub), Slovakia, Bulgaria and Poland and aired (as of recent, at least part-finished) on the EBU member chains of those countries.

A second season with 26 episodes was soon made.

== Feature film ==
A feature length film adaptation named Heidi: Rescue of the Lynx, which serves as a continuation of the Studio 100's animated series, was released on June 26, 2025 in Germany. The film was produced by Studio 100's divisions Studio 100 International and Studio 100 Film with German feature animation studio Studio Isar Animation animating the film, alongside Spanish animation studio and Studio 100's partner 3Doubles Producciones and Hungarian animation studio Hotel Hungaria Animation.
