= Vicke Viking =

Series of children's books by Runer Jonsson

Cover of the first edition of Vicke Viking (1963)

Vicke Viking is a series of children's books by Swedish author Runer Jonsson, first published in 1963. The series, set in the Viking Age, was inspired by the Icelandic sagas and the Swedish novel The Long Ships. They were originally illustrated by Ewert Karlsson. The books have been widely translated, with the German version being particularly successful.

Two animated television series and a series of films have been based on the books.

== Plot overview ==
The books' main character is Vicke (Vicky in English, Wickie in Dutch and German), son of Halvar, chief of the Viking village of Flake. Unlike his village fellows – including most of the other boys of his age – Vicke is blessed with a sharp and imaginative mind which helps him and his fellow Vikings out of many tight situations.

== Characters ==
- Vicke is the series' titular character and a boy of about 10 years of age. He is very timid and has a special fear of wolves, but his brains eventually help him solve any problem he is confronted with.
- Halvar is Vicke's father and chief of Flake. He is a rather boastful character who prefers to solve problems with brawn, but who eventually learns to listen to and value Vicke's ideas.
- Tjure and Snorre are two Vikings in Halvar's crew who constantly quarrel about anything but they really care deeply about each other.
- Urobe is the oldest Viking in Halvar's crew. While he is rather old and not as imaginative as Vicke, he is quite knowledgeable in sagas and legend lore, and he is respected as a fair judge and mediator.
- Faxe is the biggest and strongest, but also the slowest, of Flake's Vikings. He enjoys a close big-brother relationship with Vicke.
- Gorm is a rather over-excited fellow among the Flake Vikings who occupies the position of the lookout on Halvar's ship.
- Ulme is a rather neat person who considers himself a poetic soul and even carries a harp to play on joyous occasions.
- Ylva is Vicke's mother and is far more supportive of her son's intelligence than his father is.
- Ylvie is a young girl in Flake who is Vicke's neighbour and most ardent supporter. In the German film adaptation this adoration is portrayed as a childhood crush.
- Gilby is the strongest boy in Flake and Vicke's prime rival, though intellectually he is clearly Vicke's inferior.
- Sven the Terrible is a vicious Viking pirate who does not hesitate robbing even his fellow Vikings of their hard-earned plunder.
- Pokka is Sven's devious second-in-command.

== Books ==
- Vicke Viking (1963)
- Vicke Viking lurar de rödögda (1965)
- Vicke Viking Hederskung (1966)
- Vicke Viking i Vinland (1967)
- Vicke Viking hos burduserna (1969)
- Vicke Viking störtar tyrannerna (1975)
- Vicke tar över (1994)

== Other media ==
- A Japanese animated adaptation titled Vicky the Viking enjoyed tremendous success in Europe. A video game, Vicky the Viking: The Big Trial, was based on the cartoon. A ride at the Plopsa Coo Studio 100 theme park in Liège reflects the show's popularity in Belgium.
- Another animated series based on the story is Vic the Viking by Studio 100 Animation, which was released in 2013.
- A German live-action film adaptation of the stories by Michael Herbig, titled Vicky the Viking, was released in summer 2009. A sequel to that adaptation was released in 2011 as Vicky and the Treasure of the Gods.
- A CGI-animated film adaptation by Studio 100 Animation and Studio 100 Film, titled Vic the Viking: The Movie (also known as Vic the Viking and the Magic Sword), was released in 2019.
