= Klaus Fehling =

German writer, dramaturge, director and musician

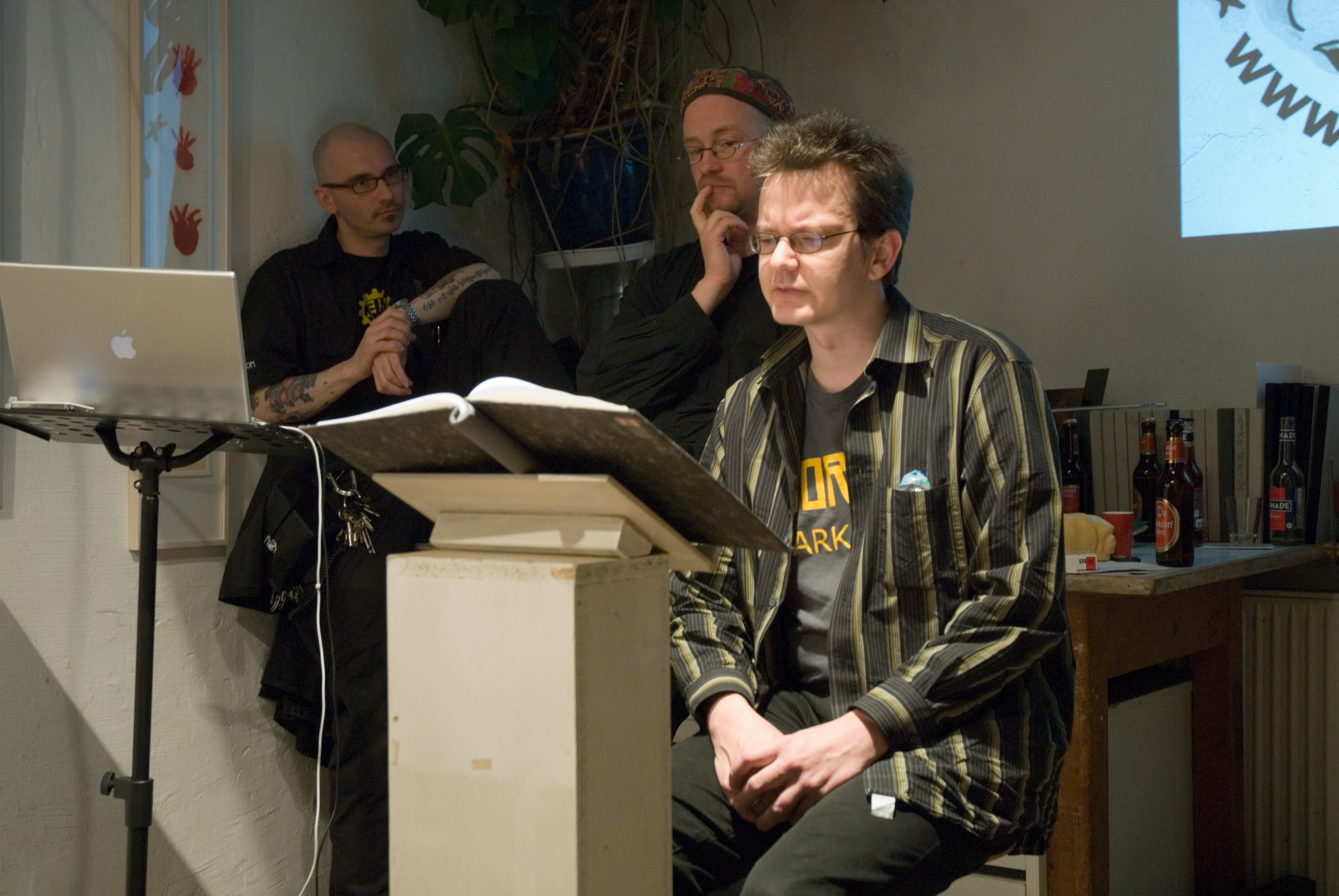
The forensic biologist Mark Benecke, painter Michael Hutter, and Klaus Fehling (from left to right) at a "Parallel Worlds" event in Cologne, 2007

Klaus Fehling (born 1969 in Cologne) is a German writer, dramaturge, director, and musician.

== Biography ==
After training as a bookseller, he worked as a journalist, PR manager (including for the Linux Association), director's assistant and dramaturgy assistant (Schauspielhaus Bochum), and theater critic. In 2002, he received a residency scholarship for performing arts at the Akademie Schloss Solitude in Stuttgart. From 2003 to 2004, he was a fellow of the Stuttgart Economic Club at the Literature House.

In 1989, together with Mark Benecke, he founded the Schlager-punk band Die Blonden Burschen. Since 2007, under the stage name “Wolfgang 'James' DIN,” he has been the guitarist and vocalist for the band Die Promovierten Praktikanten. Together with Uli Winters, he composes and writes songs, including for actor/singer Waldemar Kobus.

Since 2002, he has worked as a dramaturge for theater and opera productions across Germany. For the Cologne theater collective Futur3, he regularly writes texts and is an associated member of the collective as an author and dramaturge.

His plays have been performed by various ensembles in Germany, Serbia, Thailand, Singapore, the US, Italy, Japan, and Norway.

From 2013 to 2016, he taught dramaturgy and creative/scenic writing at the Theater Academy Cologne.

In 2011, he founded the Luftschiff-Verlag publishing house in Bodenheim am Rhein. The company moved to Cologne in 2013 and ceased operations in late 2014.

== Publications ==
- Park Chan-Kyong/Klaus Fehling: Koreans who went to Germany, Germany/Korea 2003
- Alle Türen offen (Entrepreneur portraits), 2004
- Sternstunden für Nachfolger. Unternehmergeschichten. (Luftschiff-Verlag, Bodenheim 2011, ISBN 978-3-942792-02-8)
- Risiken & Nebenwirkungen – Theaterstück (Luftschiff-Verlag, Bodenheim 2011, ISBN 978-3-942792-03-5)
- Kong – Monolog für einen fremden Helden (Luftschiff-Verlag, Bodenheim 2011, ISBN 978-3-942792-00-4)
- Nicht mein Bein / Ingame – zwei Hörstücke (Luftschiff-Verlag, Bodenheim 2011, ISBN 978-3-942792-04-2)
- Lampyriden – Theaterstück (Luftschiff-Verlag, Bruchweiler-Bärenbach 2012, ISBN 978-3-942792-09-7)
- Der Vielfraßtag (Flaggschiff-Fabrik, Brühl 2020, ISBN 978-3-949173-02-8)

== Plays ==
- The Infinite Library (Collage based on Jorge Luis Borges), premiere: Stuttgart 1996, directed by Michael Staab
- The Real Forensic, premiere: Cologne 2000, directed by Max Schumacher
- Light/Lampyriden, premiere: Berlin 2003
- Knocking Signals. Beacons. Smoke Signals., premiere: Stuttgart 2003, directed by Marcel Keller
- Judged in the City, premiere: Cologne 2005, directed by Marcel Keller
- Sigrid's Risks, premiere: Cologne 2006, directed by Stefan H. Kraft
- Klaus Fehling and the Futur3 ensemble: The Scent, the Money, and the City, premiere: Cologne 2006
- Risks and Side Effects, premiere: Theater Osnabrück 2008, directed by Marcel Keller
- Moles, premiere: Cologne 2008, directed by Christina Vayhinger
- Kong – Monologue for an Unknown Hero, premiere: Cologne 2009, directed by Christina Vayhinger
- Klaus Fehling and the Futur3 ensemble: One Night in Afghanistan, premiere: Cologne 2010, directed by André Erlen
- Talking Dogs, premiere: Cologne 2014 (final project of the Theater Academy Cologne)
- Inge Olson is Coming, premiere: Cologne 2014, directed by Klaus Fehling
- The City of Turtles, premiere: Cologne 2015 (Sommerblut Festival), directed by André Erlen
- Cold Duck, premiere: Cologne 2015, directed by Klaus Fehling
- Valuable – You’re Best as Yourself, premiere: KJT Dortmund 2018, directed by Johanna Weissert
- No-Go Area, premiere: Cologne 2018 (Sommerblut Festival), directed by André Erlen

== Radio plays ==
- Knocking Signals. Beacons. Smoke Signals., audio piece with music (CD), 2006
- Not My Leg, radio play, prod. WDR 2007
- Ingame, radio play, prod. WDR 2009
- Kong, radio play, 2012
- End of the Season, radio play, prod. WDR 2019
- Top Secret Mission, radio play, prod. WDR 2021

== Music ==
- Die Blonden Burschen: Ihre größten Misserfolge (CD), 2013
- Wolfgang DIN: Finally Stop (CD), 2013
- Unmoved (Download), 2017
- Center of the World (CD and Download), 2020
- Brigitte Angerhausen (piano) & Klaus Fehling (spoken word) – Funkenflug (CD), 2022

== Awards ==
- Performing Arts Scholarship at Akademie Schloss Solitude in Stuttgart, January 2002 to February 2004
- Cologne Dance and Theater Award 2010 for Petersberg 1, a production by Futur3 (dramaturgy: Klaus Fehling and Sandra Nuy)
- Kurt Hackenberg Prize for Political Theater 2010 for Petersberg 1, a production by Futur3 (dramaturgy: Klaus Fehling and Sandra Nuy)
