= Esther Schweins =

German actress and comedian (born 1970)

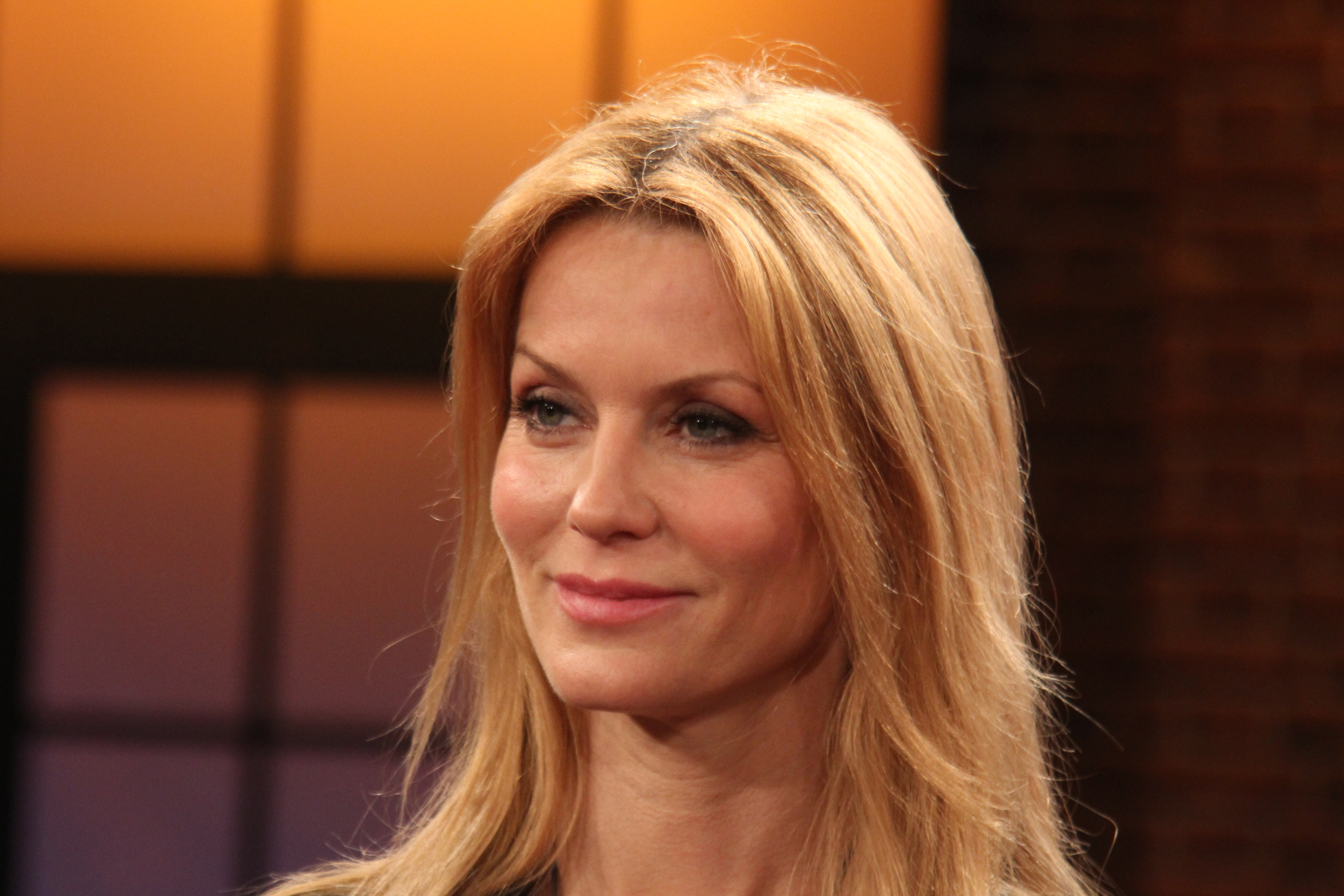
- Esther Schweins, 2012
- Born: 18 April 1970 (age 55); Oberhausen, West Germany
- Website: www.estherschweins.de

Esther Schweins (born 18 April 1970 in Oberhausen) is a German actress and comedian who became famous through her appearances on the RTL Samstag Nacht show for which she won the Bayerischer Fernsehpreis in 1994.

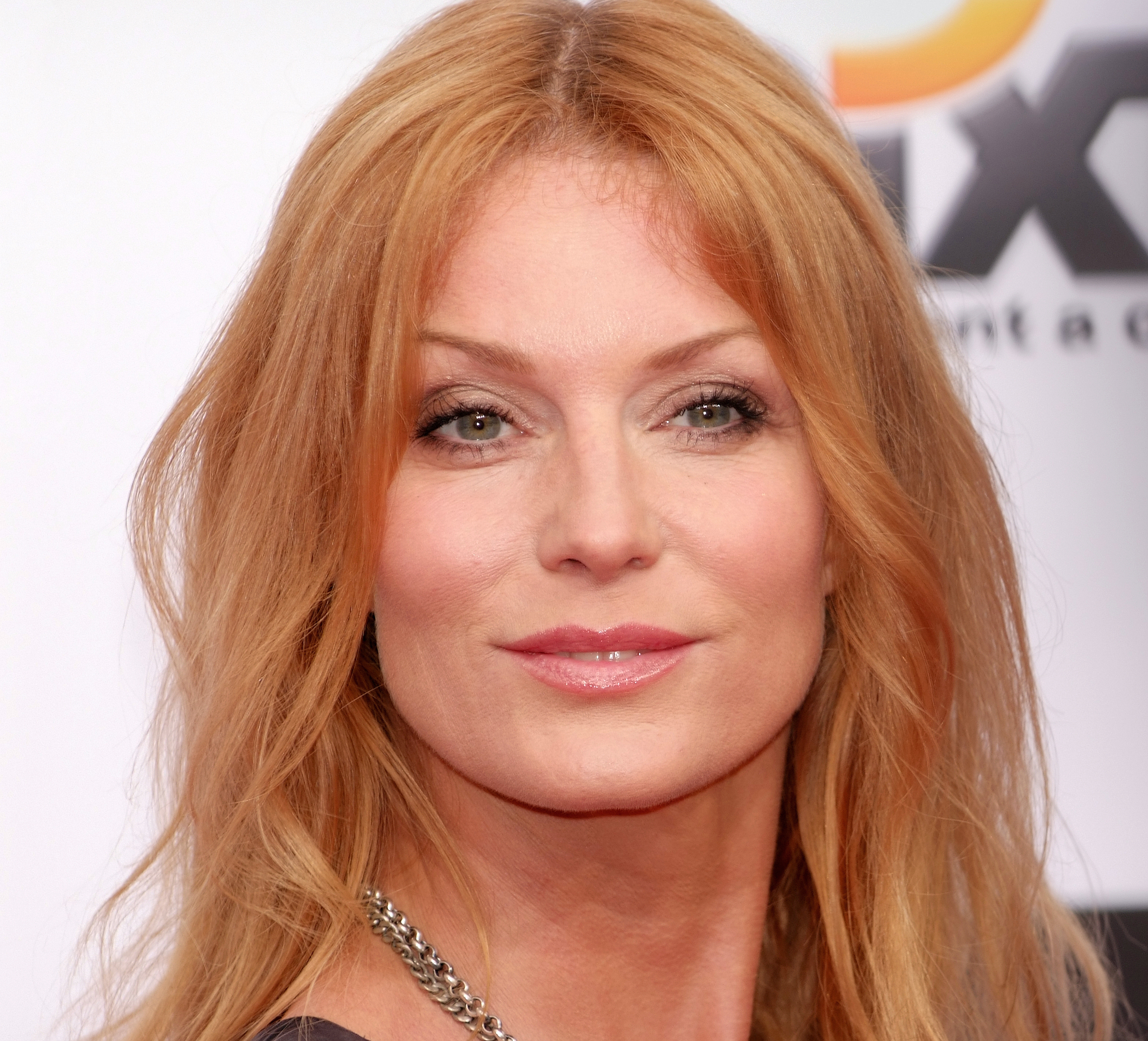
Esther Schweins (2012)

Schweins survived the 2004 Indian Ocean earthquake whilst on holiday with her mother in Sri Lanka.

She provided the German voice of Princess Fiona for the dubs of the Shrek franchise.

She has a daughter (born 2007) and a son (born 2008) with a farmer from Mallorca in Spain whom she hasn't married because she does not believe in marriage.

In 2018, she played British suffragette and political activist Emmeline Pankhurst in the German docudrama We are half the World (Die Hälfte der Welt gehört uns) about the women's suffrage movement in Germany, France and the United Kingdom.

== Selected filmography ==
- The Superwife (1996)
- Sisters from Hell (1997)
- Höllische Nachbarn (1998, TV film)
- Klassentreffen – Mordfall unter Freunden (2001, TV film)
- Die fabelhaften Schwestern (2002, TV film)
- The Calling Game (2007)
- Whispers of the Desert (2012, TV film)
- Mara and the Firebringer (2015)
