= Waldemar Kobus =

German actor (born 1966)

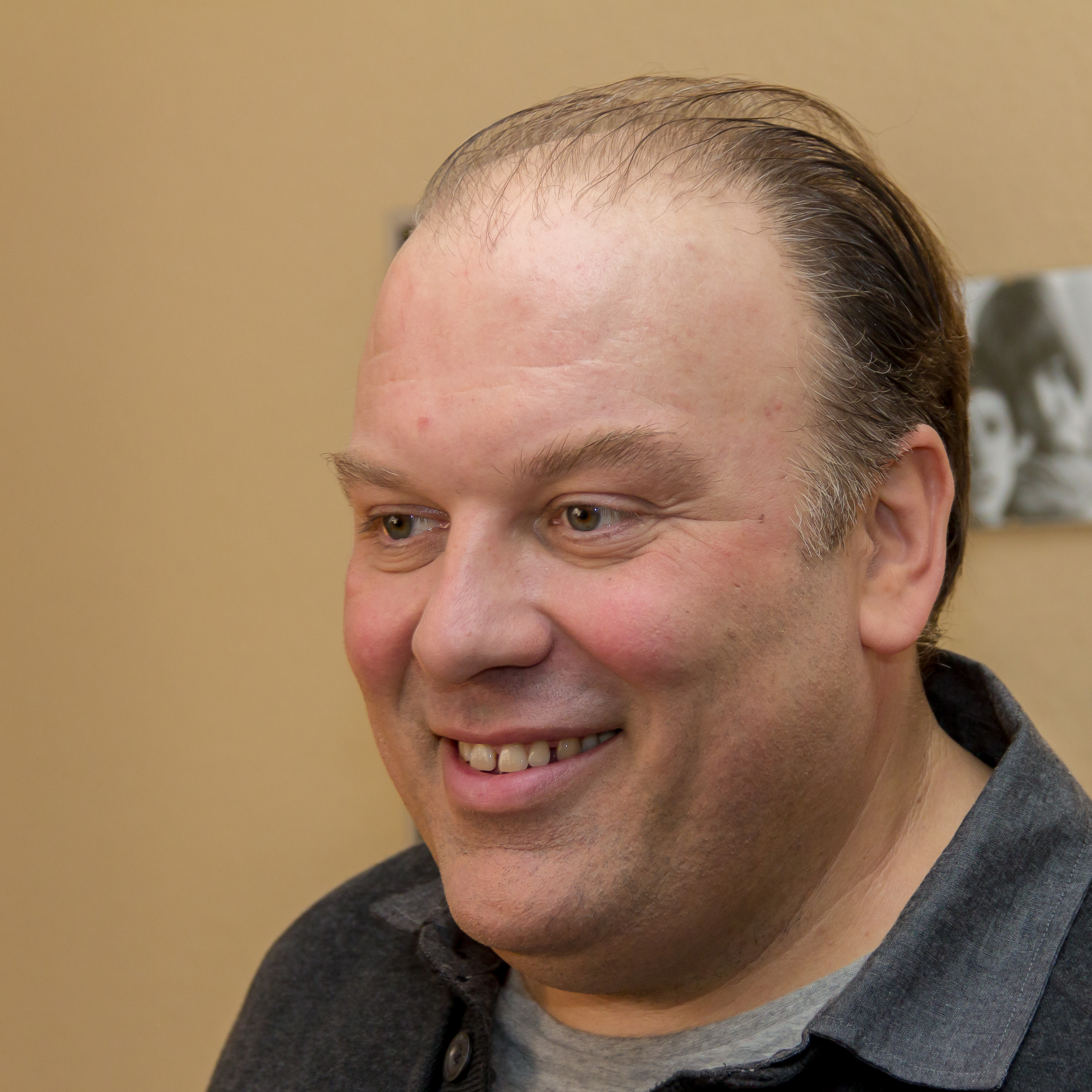
- Kobus in 2014
- Born: April 16, 1966 (age 59); Szczytno (Ortelsburg), Poland
- Occupation: Actor
- Spouse: Traute Hoess

Waldemar Kobus (born 16 April 1966 (age 59)) is a German actor.

== Biography ==
Kobus was born in Szczytno, Poland and, as an ethnic German, moved to Germany in 1970. From 1988 until 1991 he attended the Otto-Falckenberg-Schule school of performing arts in Munich, Germany. Afterwards he performed in several theatre plays in Frankfurt, Bochum, Stuttgart, Zürich, Vienna and Cologne. He has starred in TV shows since the early 1990s and as of 2001 began to be recognised by the public for his roles in movies and TV shows, in particular thanks to his role in the German comedy show Alles Atze, in which he plays the police officer 'Viktor Schimanek'. His international breakthrough was his 'SS officer Günther Franken' role in the movie Zwartboek (Black Book) by Dutch director Paul Verhoeven.

In 2007, he spoke the voice of the Yeti in the animation movie Lissi und der wilde Kaiser. He also played in the movie Speed Racer from the sisters Lilly (formerly Andy) and Lana (formerly Larry) Wachowski. In the movie Valkyrie (with Tom Cruise) he plays the police-chief of Berlin. In October 2008 he starred in the WWII movie Miracle at St. Anna from director Spike Lee.

Besides acting, he is a singer and has performed at the Kölner Karneval. He has collaborated on songs with the composers Klaus Fehling and Uli Winters.

== Personal life ==
Waldemar Kobus is married to the German actress Traute Hoess. Together they live in Bochum.

== Filmography ==
- Ein Fall für TKKG: Drachenauge (1992) - Otto
- Sonnenallee (1999) - Samson
- Alles Atze (2000–2007) - Viktor Schimanek / Hektor
- Narren (2003) - Wirt
- Besser als Schule (2004) - Ralph
- Traumschiff Surprise – Periode 1 (2004) - Hofwache
- Room Service (2004) - Arnold Heinrich
- Black Book (2006) - Günther Franken
- Waiter (2006) - Richard
- Die Österreichische Methode (2006) - Hausmeister in Skihalle
- Fashion Victims (2007) - Banker Harald Topfmöller
- Rudy: The Return of the Racing Pig (2007) - Polizist
- GG 19 – Eine Reise durch Deutschland in 19 Artikeln (2007) - Harry Möller (segment "Artikel 9")
- Freischwimmer (2007) - Kellner
- Lissi no reino dos birutas (2007) - Yeti (voice)
- Beautiful Bitch (2007) - Wirt
- Jakobs Bruder (2007) - Matthias Goldt
- The Vow (2007) - Dr. Wesener
- Speed Racer (2008) - Vinny - Cruncher Thug
- Mordshunger (2008) - Stephan Bronski
- Miracle at St. Anna (2008) - Colonel Pflueger
- Valkyrie (2008) - Police Chief Wolf-Heinrich von Helldorf
- The Wild Chicks and Life (2009) - Herr Megert
- Schläft ein Lied in allen Dingen (2009) - Wolle
- Kaifeck Murder (2009) - Franz Kogler
- Vicky the Viking (2009) - Halvar - Wickie's father
- Beloved Berlin Wall (2009) - Schulze
- Jew Suss: Rise and Fall (2010) - Eberhard Frowein
- Hochzeitspolka (2010) - Manni
- Nemesis (2010) - Karl
- Alive and Ticking (2011) - Daddy Strumpf
- Vicky and the Treasure of the Gods (2011) - Halvar
- Victor and the Secret of Crocodile Mansion (2012) - Herr Strichninsky
- Russian Disco (2012) - Rabbi
- Eine Hand wäscht die andere (2012) - Karsten Leimer
- Die schwarzen Brüder (2013) - Battista Rossi
- Wendy (2017) - Klaus Röttgers
- The Zookeeper's Wife (2017) - Dr. Ziegler
- Teenosaurus Rex (2017) - Dr. Kohlbuch
- The Captain (2017) - Hansen
- Seneca – On the Creation of Earthquakes (2023)
