= The Magic Kids: Three Unlikely Heroes =

2020 German family film

- German theatrical release poster
- Directed by: Tim Trageser
- Screenplay by: Marc Hillefeld
- Based on: Die Wolf-Gäng by Wolfgang Hohlbein
- Produced by: Christian Becker
- Starring: Aaron Kissiov; Johanna Schraml; Arsseni Bultmann
- Cinematography: Felix Poplawsky
- Edited by: Marco Pav D’Auria
- Music by: Andreas Weidinger
- Production companies: Deutsche Columbia Pictures Filmproduktion; Rat Pack Filmproduktion; Westside Filmproduktion
- Distributed by: Sony Pictures Releasing GmbH
- Release date: 23 January 2020
- Running time: 97 minutes
- Country: Germany
- Language: German
- Box office: $2,024,412

The Magic Kids: Three Unlikely Heroes (German: Die Wolf-Gäng) is a 2020 German family film directed by Tim Trageser, based on the book series Die Wolf-Gäng by Wolfgang Hohlbein.

The film was produced by Rat Pack Filmproduktion and the German division of Columbia Pictures. It was released on 23 January 2020 by Sony Pictures Releasing.

== Cast ==
- Aaron Kissiov as Vlad
- Johanna Schraml as Faye
- Arsseni Bultmann as Wolf
- Rick Kavanian as Barnabas
- Axel Stein as Hausmeister Hannappel
- Christian Berkel as Bürgermeister Louis Ziffer
- Sonja Gerhardt as Frau Circemeyer
- Julia Koschitz as Julia
- Butz Ulrich Buse as Steuereintreiber
- Arved Friese as Michael „Hackfresse“
- Nicole Heesters as Direktorin Penner
