= Zuiyo =

Japanese animation studio

Zuiyo Co., Ltd.
- Native name: 瑞鷹株式会社
- Romanized name: Kabushiki-gaisha Zuiyō
- Type: Animation film studio
- Industry: Media and entertainment
- Predecessor: Zuiyo Enterprise
- Founded: 28 December 1988; 37 years ago
- Founder: Shigeto Takahashi
- Headquarters: Jomjoyi, Kamakura, Kanagawa Prefecture, Japan
- Products: Anime
- Website: www.mmjp.or.jp/gigas/books/zuiyo.htm#1

Zuiyo Co., Ltd. (瑞鷹株式会社, Kabushiki-gaisha Zuiyō) is a Japanese animation company founded in 1988 and headquartered in Kamakura. The studio is a successor to the original Zuiyo Enterprise company that existed from 1969 to 1975 when it was reorganized into Nippon Animation with the current entity establishing in 1988 to split the original Zuiyo Enterprise into two due to debt losses.

The studio was responsible for the planning and production of a variety of series based on Western literature such as Moomin, Heidi, Girl of the Alps, Maja The Bee and Vicky the Viking.

== History ==
=== Zuiyo Enterprise and Zuiyo Eizo (1969–1975) ===
Zuiyo Eizo Zuiyo Enterprise Co., Ltd.
- Native name: 瑞鷹エンタプライズ株式会社 ズイヨー映像
- Romanized name: Zuiyō Eizō
- Formerly: Zuiyo Enterprise (1969–1972)
- Type: Animation film studio
- Industry: Media and entertainment
- Predecessor: TCJ
- Founded: 12 April 1969; 57 years ago
- Founder: Shigeto Takahashi
- Defunct: 1988; 38 years ago
- Fate: Debt
- Successor: Zuiyo; Nippon Animation
- Headquarters: Shibaura, Minato, Tokyo, Japan
- Products: Animation studio

The company was founded as Zuiyo Enterprise (瑞鷹エンタープライズ, Zuiyō Entāpuraizu) in April 1969, by TCJ former manager Shigeto Takahashi. The company was involved in the production of animated series for the TV anime staple Calpis Comic Theater (Karupisu manga gekijō), later known as World Masterpiece Theater, broadcast on Fuji TV. These series were based on children's literature such as Moomin and Andersen Stories. Animation for these shows were commissioned to two other studios: Mushi Production and Tokyo Movie, while Zuiyo was mainly involved in the planning.

Between 1972 and 1973, Zuiyo Enterprise formed an animation studio known as Zuiyo Eizo (ズイヨー映像, Zuiyō Eizō) after changing its headquarters. During this time Zuiyo was working on its first independent television production based on Johanna Spyri's Heidi, an ambitious project on which Isao Takahata and Hayao Miyazaki also worked on. In 1967, Takahashi had already produced a short pilot for a Heidi series with TCJ, but the project was shelved. In the meantime Zuiyo also worked on Vicky the Viking, a German co-production with ZDF and ORF, based on Runer Jonsson's eponymous book series. In 1974 Heidi, Girl of the Alps and Vicky the Viking were broadcast in Japan, soon gaining a huge success also in Europe. Nevertheless, Zuiyo Eizo found itself in financial difficulties due to the high production costs of its series, not enough repaid by the selling of its properties to European market. In 1975, Koichi Motohashi took over Zuiyo Eizo and established Nippon Animation, which was essentially Zuiyo Eizo's production staff (including Miyazaki and Takahata), which would continue to produce the World Masterpiece Theater series, retaining the rights of other series on which the studio was working on, such as A Dog of Flanders and Maya the Honey Bee. As a result, Zuiyo Enterprise absorbed the debt and the rights to the Heidi anime and other previous series.

=== Zuiyo ===
From here on, Zuiyo mainly dealt with the distribution and marketing of its previous creations, co-producing only occasionally new anime.

Between 1979 and 1983 the studio temporarily returned to be named Zuiyo Enterprise. In 1979, the studio produced a theatrical re-edited footage film based on Heidi, Girl of the Alps. Between the 80s and the early 90s, Zuiyo produced in collaboration with other studios some animated series such as Serendipity the Pink Dragon (1983), Elves of the Forest (1984–85), Fairy Dick (1992) and the OAV Fox Wood Tales (1991–92).

In the 2000s, the studio was involved in the production of experimental CGI-animated series and short films such as Popee the Performer, RAHMAN and Elec-king The Animation.

Between 2010 and 2017, Zuiyo also produced a series of parody shorts in which Heidi's characters appear in a comedic-zany way: Tei nenpi shōjo Haiji (2010), 13 streaming commercials promoting a new model of Nissan Note, and Arupusu no Shōjo Haiji? Chara Onji (2016) and Arupusu no Shōjo Haiji? Chara Onji Z (2017), a series of short films starring Heidi's grandfather.

== Works ==
=== TV series ===
==== Zuiyo Enterprise era ====
- The Chronicles of Kamui the Ninja ({忍風カムイ外伝, Ninpū Kamui Gaiden) – 1969 (produced by TCJ)
- Moomin (ムーミン, Mūmin) – 1969–70 (produced by Tokyo Movie and Mushi Production)
- Andersen Stories (アンデルセン物語, Anderusen Monogatari) – 1971 (produced by Mushi Production)
- New Moomin (新 ムーミン, Shin Moomin) – 1972 (produced by Mushi Production)
- Little Wansa (ワンサくん, Wansa-kun) – 1973 (produced by Mushi Production)
- Fables of the Green Forest (山ねずみロッキーチャック, Yama Nezumi Rokkī Chakku) – 1973 (first independent production)
- Heidi, Girl of the Alps (アルプスの少女ハイジ, Arupusu no Shōjo Haiji) – 1974
- Vicky the Viking (小さなバイキング ビッケ, Chiisana Viking Vikke) – 1974–75 (co-produced with Taurus Film and completed by Nippon Animation (eps. 53–78))

==== Zuiyo era ====
- Serendipity the Pink Dragon (ピュア島の仲間たち, Pyuatō no Nakama-tachi) – 1983 (co-produced with Dragon Production, SHAFT, Studio Unicorn and Tama Production)
- Elves of the Forest (森のトントたち, Mori no Tonto Tachi) – 1984–85 (co-produced with SHAFT)
- Fairy Dick (妖精ディック, Yōsei Dikku) – 1992 (co-produced with Grouper Productions, Marubeni)
- Popee the Performer – 2000

=== OAV ===
- Fox Wood Tales (フォックスウッドものがたり, Fokkus uuddo monogatari) – 1991–92 (co-produced with Grouper Productions, Marubeni and Nippon Columbia)

=== Film ===
- Arupusu no Shōjo Haiji (アルプスの少女ハイジ) – 1979

=== Commercial ===
- Tei nenpi shōjo Haiji (低燃費少女ハイジ) – 2010 (co-produced with Studio Crocodile)
