= Mara and the Firebringer =

- Directed by: Tommy Krappweis
- Written by: Tommy Krappweis; Sebastian B. Voss
- Based on: Mara and the Firebringer by Tommy Krappweis
- Produced by: Christian Becker
- Starring: Lilian Prent; Jan Josef Liefers; Esther Schweins; Christoph Maria Herbst; Eva Habermann
- Cinematography: Stefan Schuh
- Edited by: Jochen Donauer
- Music by: Andreas Lenz von Ungern-Sternberg; Dominik Schuster
- Production companies: Rat Pack Filmproduktion; RTL; bumm film
- Distributed by: Constantin Film Produktion
- Release date: 29 March 2015
- Running time: 94 minutes
- Country: Germany
- Language: German

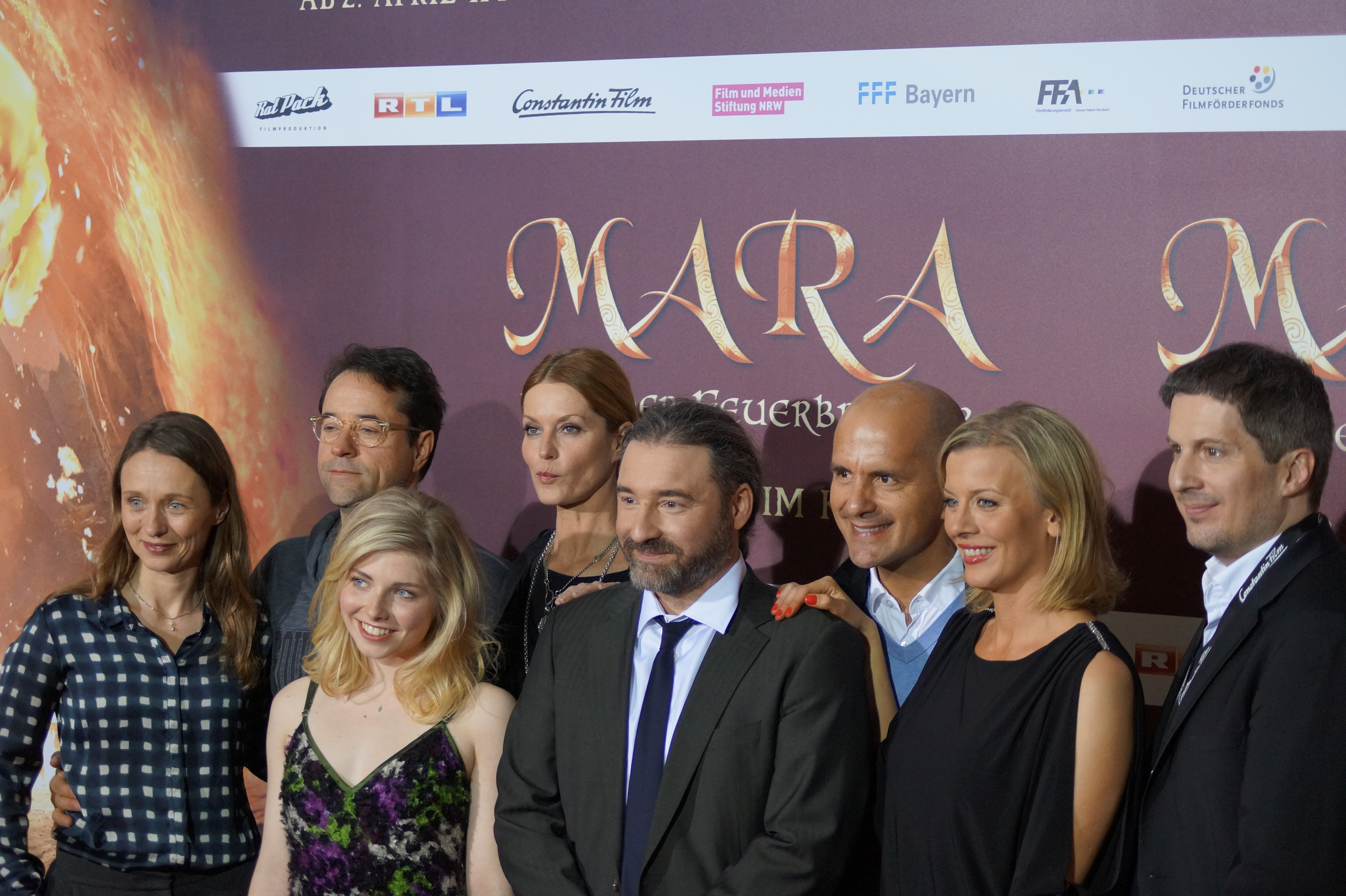
Cast and crew at the German premiere of "Mara and the Firebringer", on 29 March 2015, at the Cinedom Cologne

Mara and the Firebringer is a 2015 German fantasy film. It is an adaptation of the first book in the trilogy of the same name by Tommy Krappweis, who also wrote the screenplay and directed it. The focus of the story is on Mara Lorbeer, a 15-year-old girl in Munich who learns that she is a spákona, a seeress from Norse and Germanic mythology, and is supposed to prevent the impending Ragnarök. She jumps back and forth between the world of the present and the world of Norse and Germanic mythology and meets such figures as Loki, Thor, Sigurd and the dangerous Firebringer. As with the novels, the film's technical adviser was Rudolf Simek.

The film was produced by Christian Becker and his company Rat Pack Filmproduktion in cooperation with RTL and Krappweis' production company bumm film. Lilian Prent, in her feature film debut, plays the title role of Mara Lorbeer. Jan Josef Liefers, Esther Schweins, Christoph Maria Herbst, and Eva Habermann co-star. The world premiere took place on March 29, 2015, in Cologne.

== Production ==
The film was produced by RTL Television and Rat Pack Filmproduktion in cooperation with bumm film. The Film- und Medienstiftung NRW and the FilmFernsehFonds Bayern each supported the production with the maximum possible subsidy of one million euros. The film was also funded via the Filmförderungsanstalt and the Deutscher Filmförderfonds. Constantin Film served as the film's distributor. The six-week production took place in 2013 in Munich, with additional scenes filmed near Soinsee, in the neighboring towns of Spitzingsee, Inzell, Oberding, and at the MMC Studios in Cologne.

The band Schandmaul provided the original song, "Ein Echter Wahrer Held," with the lyrics written by Tommy Krappweis and the film's composer Andreas Lenz von Ungern-Sternberg. A demo version of the song was featured in episode 7 of YouTube gaming channel High5's web series Hoppers and soon gained memetic status as a "motivational song" among the German gaming community.

In early 2017, German livestreaming channel Rocket Beans TV released the 72-minute fan documentary Götter, Gags und Fantasy - Die Mara Story about the seven-year history of the Mara project, from the initial conception to the premiere, featuring interviews with director Tommy Krappweis, behind-the-scenes information, and deleted scenes that had to be cut for the film to qualify for a 6 rating by the FSK.

== Reception ==
Filmdienst described the film as an "exciting time travel film" while praising the acting of Lilian Prent and her handling of the protagonist's character arc. Bild recommended the film, stating, “Finally, a German fantasy film about local legends and myths, and not a cheap Hollywood imitation.” The German film magazine Cinema, however, slammed the film: "The uneven plot and the cheap effects make the end result look pretty rusty."

Among the German press, the most prominent review came from Süddeutsche Zeitung: “Tommy Krappweis has adapted the first book of his fantasy trilogy of the same name as an action-packed spectacle. It's definitely too intense for six-year-olds, but certainly fun and exciting for older children.” GameStar said of the film: "Mara and the Firebringer is hardly a new Lord of the Rings, but it is a very good family-oriented fantasy film from Germany - and there haven't been many of those since The NeverEnding Story, more than 30 years ago."

Former ZDF television producer Josef Göhlen praised the film as a positive example of a domestically produced German family film in a Kressreport article on the subject of the genre: "Anyone who has watched the film with curiosity and without reservation must admit that […] it has succeeded in creating a realistic and at the same time magical story in the modern age with witty dialogue that those of all ages can enjoy, with interesting characters and skillfully staged visual effects [...] - and given that the budget that is so tiny compared to international productions of the same genre one cannot help but applaud the whole undertaking." Due to many in the German film industry echoing his sentiments, two weeks later the magazine published a widely-publicized reply from Tommy Krappweis, in which he described the problems he faced in releasing his film as well as the general difficulties of family and genre films in German cinema.

Following the film's failure at the box office, it was promoted on social media and through newsletters from such sources as Ring*Con, FedCon, Role Play Convention, Fantasy and Roleplay Convention, and many others. The 501st Legion's German Garrison wrote: "A film that deserves to be mentioned in the same breath as, for example, The NeverEnding Story. A film that is definitely suitable for all ages and is fun for the whole family.” German steampunk forum Clockworker wrote: "The unshakable attention to detail, the use of all available resources - from the sheer imagination and effort put into the fantasy scenes and Krappweis' unique sense of humour - make Mara and the Firebringer a gem of German genre film production that doesn't have to hide behind Hollywood."

However, these efforts were ultimately futile and could not prevent the film from being a box-office bomb. But when Tommy Krappweis showed the film in a private director's screening at the Role Play Convention later that year, new life was unexpectedly breathed into it. It not only ran twice as long as planned in the cinema tent, but did so in a continuous loop. Although the film is based on the first part of a three-part series, and the possibility of a sequel is hinted at at the end of the film, an actual sequel seems very unlikely due to the film's box-office failure.

== Awards ==
- Rated "worthwhile" by the Deutsche Film- und Medienbewertung (FBW).
- Voted "Best German Fantasy Film in Over 30 Years" in the RPC Fantasy Award's Jury Awards category.
- The FBW youth film jury gave the film 4 out of 5 stars in the "exciting," "tricky," "adventurous," and "soulful" categories and 5 out of 5 stars in "imaginative".
