= Fables of the Green Forest =

Japanese anime television series

- Fables of the Green Forest poster

山ねずみ ロッキーチャック (Rocky Chuck the Mountain Rat)
- Genre: Adventure
- Created by: Thornton W. Burgess
- Anime television series
- Directed by: Masaharu Endō
- Produced by: Shigehito Takahashi; Junzō Nakajima; Yoshinobu Nishizaki (uncredited)
- Written by: Yūji Tanno
- Music by: Seiichirō Uno
- Studio: Zuiyo Eizo
- Original network: FNS (Fuji TV)
- English network: AU: Network Ten; CA: TVOntario Knowledge Network; HK: ATV TVB; IE: Raidió Teilifís Éireann; NZ: TV One; UK: ITV Channel 4; ZA: TV1 SABC 2
- Original run: 7 January 1973 – 30 December 1973
- Episodes: 52

Fables of the Green Forest (山ねずみロッキーチャック, Yama Nezumi Rokkī Chakku; lit. "Rocky Chuck, the Mountain Rat", also known as Rocky Chuck the Woodchuck, Chuck the Beaver and Johnny Chuck) is an anime television series based on a series of books published in the 1910s and 1920s by Thornton W. Burgess which ran on the Japanese network Fuji Television from 7 January to 30 December 1973. It consists of 52 episodes and was produced by the animation studio Zuiyo Eizo as its first independent production as part of the Calpis Comic Theater (later known as World Masterpiece Theater).

== Synopsis ==
The series consists of the adventures of Johnny (or Rocky), a woodchuck, and his mate Polly in the Green Forest. They make a lot of friends among their neighbours, and everyone works together to avoid the attacks of the different predators that put them in danger, such as man, the weasel, and the fox.

== Characters ==
- Johnny Chuck, a woodchuck, sometimes called Rocky
- Polly Chuck
- Peter Rabbit
- Uncle Billy Possum
- Chatterer the Red Squirrel
- Bobby Raccoon, he wears pants and suspenders
- Reddy the Fox
- Sammy Jay, a blue jay
- Grandfather Frog
- Old Man Toad
- Buster the Bear, a black bear
- Red Tail Hawk
- Harry Mink (called Billy in the books)
- Jimmy Skunk
- Tom, Farmer Brown's son
- Bowser the Hound
- Joe Otter
- Paddy Beaver
- Danny Meadowmouse

== Episodes ==
No.	Title	Original release date
1	"Spring Comes to the Green Forest"	7 January 1973
The series takes place in the Green Forest and introduces Rocky (Johnny) and company who sets out to bring spring to the green forest. One day, for instance, Rocky and his friends are going to the Spring Festival, but first, there is some information to help them retrieve the special spring term of the other world. Reddy the gox tries to get at the little woodchuck cubs, but thanks to Peter Rabbit's help he is foiled in his plan.
2	"Johnny Grows Up"	14 January 1973
The time for all young animals to leave their parents has come, and Johnny is no exception. His father accepts it, but his mother has doubts due to how fumbling Johnny is. Johnny with unedning gumption goes forth and reaches the green forest.
3	"Johnny Builds His Home"	21 January 1973
Johnny has arrived in the Green Forest, and he has to find a spot to dig a borrow to call home, but finding where to make own home is not as easy as it looks, especially with Reddy Fox on the prowl. Luckily, the lady chuck Polly can help out.
4	"Huge Tracks in the Forest"	28 January 1973
A huge creature arrives in Green Forest and scares the populace silly. Johnny had a first-hand encounter, but everyone else (except Polly) assume he is lying despite evidence to the contrary. The "monster" turns out to be a bear named Buster who is very nice (and humorous).
5	"Buster Bear Comes to the Green Forest"	5 February 1973
Continuing from the previous episode, Buster has become accepted by the Green Forest residents, except Joe Otter and Harry (Billy) Mink, as Buster nonchalantly took a fish from Joe. Joe and Harry try to keep all the fish to themselves, but this has the unintended consequence of making Buster hunt other characters. Joe realizes the fish do not belong to him and Harry alone, especially after Grandfather Frog pointed out the flies he eats are not owned by him.
6	"The Monster of Poplar Hill"	12 February 1973
A porcupine named Prickly has traveled all the way from Canada, but so has a spherical-shaped creature that rolls around and has been terrorizing the Green Forest. Reddy offers to fight it, but when he does, he chickens out. Then when Granny Fox tries to eat Peter Rabbit, the monster suddenly becomes a hero, and it turns out to be Prickly, who also happens to be an acquaintance of Buster.
7	"Mischievous Chatterer"	19 February 1973
Chatterer plays a mean prank on the forest denizens, and after the Mean Weasel arrives, most opted to be rid of Chatterer, but Johnny talks them out of it and convinces them to join forces (despite feeling the same toward Chatterer) and after using Reddy as a test subject, they drive the weasel out.
8	"Paddy Beaver Comes to the Forest"	26 February 1973
The Laughing Brook has suddenly gone dry, and this is a disaster for Joe, Harry, Grandfather Frog and Jerry Muskrat. Travelling upstream, they find the source is fine, but then find a dam made of logs has clogged up the stream, then trees suddenly start toppling. All of this points to a beaver named Paddy being responsible, and while he means no harm, Joe is less than pleased. Thankfully, the creek refills and all accept Paddy.
9	"The Troublesome Four"	5 March 1973
Uncle Billy the Opossum misses his wife and kids and considered leaving the Green Forest to join them, but likes Polly's idea of having them move to his home. The forest animals plan a party in Billy's honor, but Reddy Fox (wanting some payback on Billy for fooling him by playing dead), Sammy Jay (who's ticked off at not getting invited), Blackie the Crow and Mean Weasel have teamed-up to crash it, only for Grandfather Frog, who eavesdropped, to warn the party in advance.
10	"Bob the Quail"	12 March 1973
Bob the Quail and his wife Mrs. Quail build a nest well-hidden beside a game-trail, and refuse to let anyone know where it is, friend and foe. Then the Quail chicks hatch from their eggs, and they move to Peter's thicket. Now the chicks must learn how to keep themselves alive, but one acts cocky and decides to skip it and play in the open, right where Granny and Reddy fox are waiting.
11	"Sammy's Revenge"	19 March 1973
Chatterer lays low at Mr. Brown's farm to avoid Mean Weasel, but the farm is stripped bare of crops. Meanwhile Sammy Jay does some raiding on the human orchard packed with harvested corn, so Chatterer decides to claim it for himself, and proves it by pranking Sammy. When the blue jay finds out (courtesy of Reddy), he aims to get even with Reddy, only for all three to get in trouble of Bowser and Blackie the Cat.
12	"Johnny's Secret Door"	26 March 1973
Reddy discovers Johnny secret exit, forcing him to build another one. His mate Polly gets lost until Johnny finds her.
13	"A Gun in the Forest"	2 April 1973
After Reddy has raided Mr. Brown's chicken coop, Tom Brown has had enough and resorts to hunting Reddy to permanently stop him, taking his dog Bowser with him.
14	"Peter the Rabbit of Thorn Estate"	9 April 1973
Reddy and Mean Weasel team up to flush out Peter from his thicket-fortress, but navigating it won't be easy.
15	"Old Mr. Toad"	16 April 1973
Grandfather Frog's friend Mr. Toad arrives. At first he seems alright, but after hanging out with Buster, he suddenly starts looking down on everyone else, prompting all (except Johnny) to teach him a lesson.
16	"Bobby Raccoon is Captured"	23 April 1973
Bobby Raccoon's tree is dying, so Tom puts it out of its misery by chopping it down, but in doing so accidentally gave Bobby a broken foot, and Tom has to take Bobby to the farm to heal. Initially Bobby resents it, feeling more like a prisoner than a patient, but later starts to enjoy it, and once fully healed Tom returns him to the wild.
17	"Paddy Builds a Dream House"	30 April 1973
Paddy has finally begun building a beaver lodge, but the process takes a lot of work (and days). Sammy however believes Paddy is a terrible house-builder, and because of it (along with still being sore at Paddy for felling a tree with the jay in it) tries to slow his progress by manipulating Jimmy Skunk to stink up the area and Mean Weasel into hunting Paddy.
18	"Poor Mrs. Quack"	7 May 1973
Hunters are about and Mrs. Quack the Mallard has been injured. While she recovers, everyone make sure she is fed and protected until she can fly again to find her husband.
19	"The Search for Mr. Quack"	14 May 1973
Continuing from the last episode, Mrs. Quack is able to fly again, but the hunters continue to menace the wilderness, preventing her from searching for Mr. Quack. It is up to Johnny, Peter, Sammy, Blackie and Joe to find Mr. Quack before the humans or Reddy find him first.
20	"Granny Fox and Reddy"	21 May 1973
Reddy once more bites off more than he can chew by trying to raid Brown's chicken coop, so Granny decides to provide a test, which involves crossing a train-trestle and getting predators run over. Reddy seems to get the message, but when trying it on Bowser, the dog proves smarter.
21	"Sammy Gets Mocked"	28 May 1973
A bird from the south arrives in Green Forest and claims to know Uncle Billy. At the same time everyone claims Sammy is being noisy in the middle of the night, something that Sammy never does. It is soon revealed that Billy's friend and the other "Sammy" is a mockingbird named Mocker.
22	"The Big Commotion in the Forest"	4 June 1973
Continuing from the previous episode, Sammy Jay takes advantage of Mocker's mimicry power to play pranks on the forest denizens. The downside is that they are turning everyone against each other, but Billy and Johnny clear things up and Mocker gets accepted.
23	"Buster the Hero"	11 June 1973
When Tom comes across footprints and eaten fish left by Buster, then flees in terror, Joe suspects the human is afraid of bears. Blackie crow decides to make the two meet face-to-face, and it resulted in both sides fearing each other, but Buster's fear has gotten him insulted by everyone (except Johnny), making him go on a rampage.
24	"Traps in the Forest"	18 June 1973
Hunters have put foothold-traps across the land, and Jerry briefly falls victim to one. Grandfather frog, who knows their weaknesses, sends off everyone to remove them, but the humans won't give up that easily: if the clamps won't work, they will try a snare.
25	"Peter Plays a Prank"	25 June 1973
When Peter gets his path cut off by Reddy, he suddenly decides to lure the fox into Jimmy's barrel, wrecking it. Predictably Jimmy assumes Reddy intended it and sprays him for it, but upon finding Peter is the real culprit (courtesy of Sammy), Jimmy vows to teach him a lesson.
26	"The Straw Hat Monster"	1 July 1973
Reddy tries to lure Peter onto a carrot patch at Mr. Brown's farm to catch him, but Peter takes care to visit before Reddy shows up. The same happens with a walnut-tree, but Reddy made sure to wake up at the exact same time as Peter when the rabbit visits Brown's cabbage patch.
27	"Mr. Condor Comes to the Forest"	8 July 1973
A massive bird arrives in Green Forest, sending everyone panicking by his size, until he saves Polly from Reddy. His name is Mr. Condor, and he happens to be another friend of Uncle Billy from the south.
28	"The Secret of Mr. Condor"	15 July 1973
Continuing from the last episode, Mr. Condor and his wife Mrs. Condor have settled in Green Forest to raise their young. Peter however finds it impossible to have eggs without a nest, but condors in general can manage.
29	"Reddy Fox Keeps Home"	22 July 1973
Granny Fox leaves the forest for a bit, but a new, bigger predator has shown up, filling the populace with fear. Digger the Badger identifies the newcomer as Old Man Coyote, who he is friends with, and is scarier than Reddy.
30	"Coyote is the Smartest"	29 July 1973
Continuing from the previous episode, Old Man Coyote has become the newest resident of Green Forest, but Granny Fox has returned early and after hearing this, tries to manipulate the coyote and Prickly into killing each other. She was not aware that Mr. Toad had overheard her little boast, and races to prevent the fight from happening, but for once his weak hops are liable.
31	"Longlegs the Heron"	5 August 1973
Joe and Harry are bored, so they decide to prank Grandfather Frog by sending Longlegs the Heron at him, but this might be pushing it, and Johnny and Polly warn them of it. Ironically the frog is actually aware of the heron's presence and intentions, but things go awry when Whitetail the Hawk joins in.
32	"The Importance of Paddy's Dam"	12 August 1973
A twist of Deja Vu has happened as the Laughing Brook and Smiling Pool dry up again. Trekking up a dried riverbed is rather exertive for the aquatic characters (Joe, Harry, Grandfather Frog, Jerry and Spotty Turtle), so much so that they begin to slack off (except Spotty). Predictably, it is Paddy that is responsible (again) as he is building a second dam, and refuses to remove it, until Jerry warns him about how it is affecting the others.
33	"Bobby & Blackie Crow"	19 August 1973
Bobby has not gotten enough sleep, mostly because he is now homeless (since Tom chopped down his tree several episodes ago), but nobody seems to care enough to help, or in Blackie's case take advantage of it. Eventually Bobby finds a new place to call home: a cave near Buster's.
34	"Grandfather Frog Leaves the Forest"	26 August 1973
Grandfather Frog has been shamed from trying to swallow a too big fish whole, so he decides to go off exploring like Mr. Toad. He only gets as far as the human farm, where Tom keeps him in a bucket. Grandfather begins to regret going off, but luckily Tom brings him back home.
35	"Granny Fox and the Coyote"	2 September 1973
Granny Fox once again comes up with a plan to get rid of Old Man Coyote, so she sends Reddy to spy on his sleeping place everyday, but Peter, Polly and Johnny have noticed and alert the coyote.
36	"Who's a Coward"	9 September 1973
Danny Meadow-mouse is a jumpy fellow, but rather than hide his cowardice, he brags about it and considers it a good thing, unlike some of the others, who find admitting cowardice too insulting to themselves, especially Chatterer. Danny's paranoia though is surprisingly helpful: it is what lets him survive a snake, Whitetail and Reddy.
37	"Lost in the Green Forest"	16 September 1973
Whitetail finds a puppy and tries to abduct it for breakfast, but it escapes, only for it to become lost in the Green Forest. The residents take it in, until Sammy informs them it is a coyote, and a son of a friend of Old Man Coyote's. Johnny and Polly opt to still take care of it, but Reddy has other ideas, and Whitetail is still after it. Woodchucks and Old Coyote must save the pup from fox and bird.
38	"Reddy Fox and the Sheep"	23 September 1973
For the second time in his life, Peter gets Jimmy and Reddy to antagonize each other, and Reddy starts chasing Peter all over the place, and even Bowser won't save Peter from Reddy's wrath.
39	"The Big Boast"	30 September 1973
Peter asks Chatterer if he is smarter than Sammy, and ever the show off, Chatterer confirms it, and in Sammy's hearing range, resulting in a battle of cunning and pride.
40	"Johnny's Adventure"	7 October 1973
As autumn arrives on the land, Johnny finds his house is wearing out from age, so he decides to find a new place to live and leaves, much to his friends' sadness. Johnny comes to realize adventuring is not all cracked up as it is though, but strangely, he found he was walking in one big circle around Green Forest.
41	"Uncle Billy Regrets"	14 October 1973
It is getting harder and harder for Jimmy to find bugs due to the cooling weather, so he decides to fallow Billy to the farm and feast on a few chicken eggs, but all the eggs they find are dead eggs. Things get worse when Jimmy snaps at Billy for dropping one egg on him, so much so that he is prioritizing vengeance over common sense.
42	"Captive Chatterer"	21 October 1973
After raiding the corn storehouse so much, Chatterer does not believe he even needs to be careful anymore. This bites him when he idiotically wanders into an animal trap set by Tom just because he got overconfident, and gets turned into a pet. Naturally Chatterer despises it, but after Tom treated him nicely so much, he actually started to like it, but it did not stop him from feeling homesick.
43	"Peter Changes His Name"	28 October 1973
Peter has grown sick of his name, finding it too repetitive, so he takes Jimmy's advice in changing it, and now calls himself Cottontail. He also tries changing his way of talking. While he enjoys it, the others find it a bad thing and try to get him to accept his real name without complaint.
44	"Tom and Bob the Quail"	4 November 1973
While some birds like Mr. Condor and his family migrate away to avoid the incoming winter, others like Bob and his family tough it out. The quails feed at the farm, but are suddenly attacked by a poacher, and one of the young quails, named Mike, is hit in the wing. Luckily Tom comes to the rescue and fixes him up.
45	"The Incident at Moonlight Party"	11 November 1973
A full moon is out tonight, and everyone holds a party centered on it, but Granny and Reddy exploit it to catch someone to eat, primarily Peter.
46	"Sammy Learns a Lesson"	18 November 1973
Sammy once again lets his ego control him, and the other animals humiliate him for it. As Peter was the cause, Sammy gets payback on him by imitating Whitetail, but when trying to do the same to Chatterer, Sammy is torn between letting Blackie the cat attack him for it (which the cat fully intends) or saving him.
47	"A Gift Buster Left Behind"	25 November 1973
Buster has to stock up for winter, but in doing so everyone else fear he will starve them when he inadvertently took acorns from Chatterer, so they consider kicking him out. Buster himself decides to leave if it will make everyone happy, though not before leaving farewell gifts.
48	"Peter the Imitator"	2 December 1973
Peter wants somebody to play with, but all his friends, mainly those of species that hibernate, need to prepare themselves for it, and some like Grandfather Frog are already hibernating. As rabbits do not hibernate at all, Peter seems to not know what it is, but after Billy explains, Peter wishes to attempt it.
49	"Danny in the Snow"	9 December 1973
Danny becomes excited at the amount of snow on the land and plays around in it. Tunneling in snow is his favorite activity, but it becomes a survival strategy when Reddy and Granny stalk him. While avoiding foxes, he soon learns that it is not just them who are hunting him, but also an owl.
50	"Peter and the Peach Tree"	16 December 1973
Peter wants to eat peach tree-bark, though Danny warns him it is too risky, but danger has not stopped Peter from taking chances before. He however did not know eating the bark would kill the trees, but the humans did and resort to wrapping the trees in shielding-nets meant to keep rabbits off, but left one to act as a bait.
51	"Whose Footprint is the Other One"	23 December 1973
After hearing Jimmy had eaten some chicken eggs from the farm, Billy cannot stop thinking about eggs. While he took care to walk in Jimmy's footprints to avoid exposing his identity, he neglects keeping his tail off the snow, which does get identified. Even though he escapes capture, he still needs to keep himself from being tracked.
52	"Johnny's Hibernation"	30 December 1973
Peter decides to plan a farewell party between the animals that hibernate (like woodchucks, bears and squirrels) and the ones that don't (like rabbits, porcupines, raccoons, otters, minks, skunks, beavers and all non-migratory birds) so they could be together one last time. Of course, he made note to exclude Reddy and Mean Weasel, but that won't stop the carnivores from joining in anyway.

== Music ==
- Opening theme (Japanese version): Midori no Hidamari by Micchī (Mitsuko Horie) and Chatterers

== Broadcast history ==
The series has been aired in many countries outside Japan, such as Italy (on TMC), Germany (Bayerischer Rundfunk), Spain (TVE, Canal Nou), Romania (TVR 1), Portugal (RTP), Venezuela (VTV), Bahrain (Channel 55), the United Kingdom (ITV / Channel 4), Canada (TVOntario, Knowledge Network and CBLFT-DT, dubbed in both English and French), Saudi Arabia (KSA 1 / Saudi 2), Australia (Network Ten), Iran (IRIB TV1), Ireland (RTÉ One), Israel (Channel 2 dubbed in Hebrew), the Emirates (Dubai 33), Nigeria (NTA), Bangladesh (BTV), Panama (SCN-TV), Cyprus (METV), New Zealand (TV One), Brazil (SBT), the Netherlands (TROS), Malaysia (Network Two), Singapore (Mediacorp Channel 5), India (DD National), Indonesia (RCTI / SCTV), South Africa (TV1 / SABC 2), Namibia (SWABC, while known as South West Africa), Hong Kong (both ATV and TVB), Trinidad and Tobago (TTT), Poland (TVP1), Jamaica (JBC) and Zimbabwe (ZBC TV).

The release of the series into Canada was done through ZIV International in 1978. There was a second English dub under the title Friends of the Green Forest which aired on the TVOKids on TVOntario in the 1990s.

In the United Kingdom, the original transmission of the series as aforementioned on the ITV network was cut short, with only the first 30 episodes being broadcast in 1982, because the series was dropped due to the introduction of the Children's ITV service in January 1983 taking over the series' former timeslot. Some of the other episodes were broadcast sporadically in the UK on the "Early Morning" weekend segment on Channel 4 in the early 1990s.
