= Vicky the Viking (film) =

- Film poster
- Directed by: Michael Herbig
- Written by: Michael Herbig; Alfons Biedermann; Runer Jonsson
- Based on: Vicke Viking (book series) by Runer Jonsson
- Produced by: Christian Becker
- Starring: Jonas Hämmerle; Waldemar Kobus; Ankie Beilke; Helmfried von Lüttichau
- Cinematography: Gerhard Schirlo
- Edited by: Alexander Dittner
- Music by: Ralf Wengenmayr
- Production company: Rat Pack Filmproduktion
- Distributed by: Constantin Film
- Release date: 9 September 2009
- Running time: 85 minutes
- Country: Germany
- Languages: German; Cantonese
- Budget: €8 million

Vicky the Viking (German: Wickie und die starken Männer, "Vicky and the Strong Men") is a 2009 German adventure comedy film directed by Michael Herbig, based on Runer Jonsson's Vicke Viking children's book series and its subsequent animated series adaptation Vicky the Viking. Produced by Christian Becker of Rat Pack Filmproduktion it premiered in Munich on 9 September 2009.

On 3 October 2009, during a show of Wetten, dass..?, Herbig was presented with the Goldene Leinwand for the film's viewership of three million within its first 18 weeks. It sold nearly 5 million tickets in Germany alone, for a total gross revenue of nearly $57 million.

== Synopsis ==
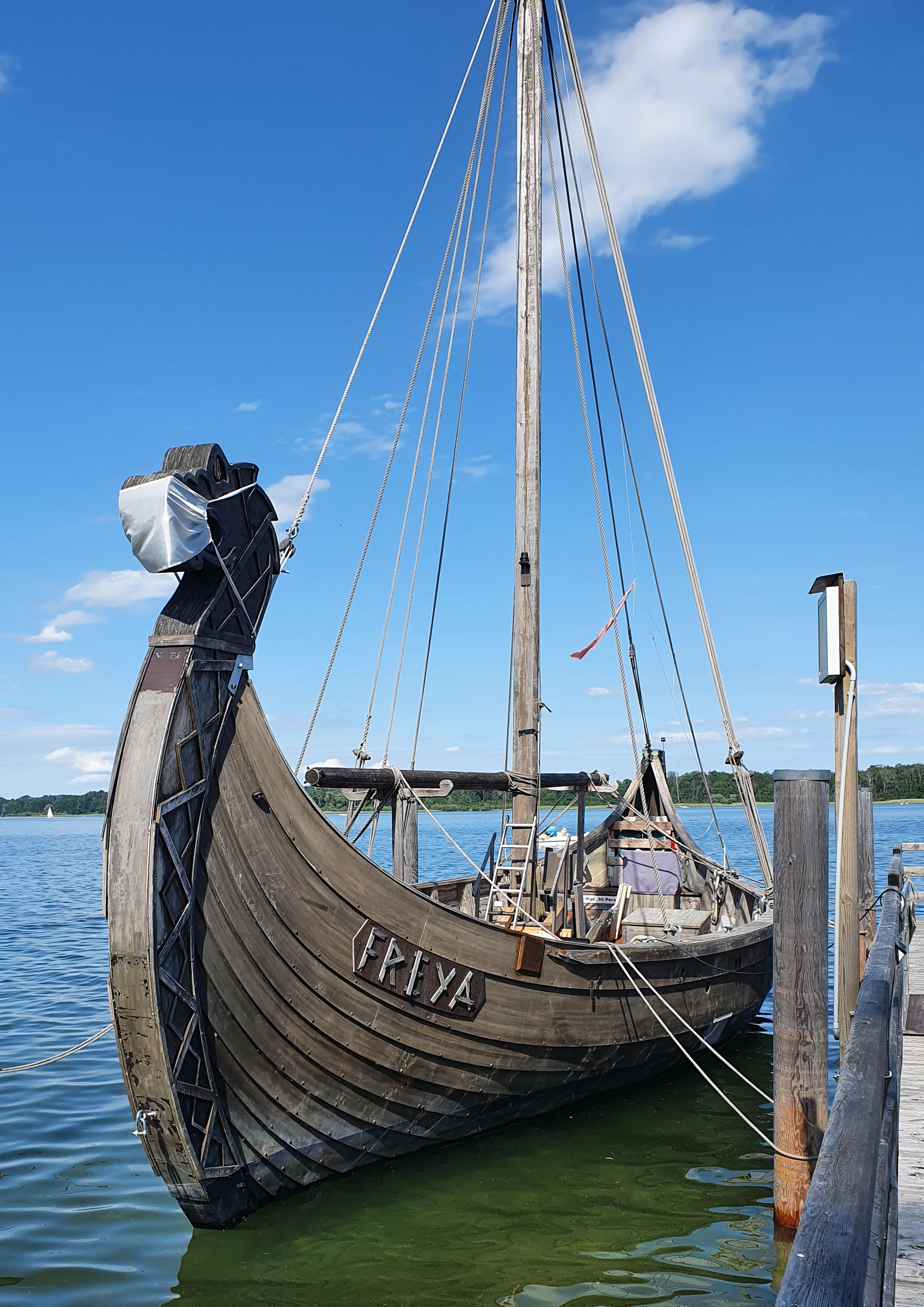
Original Viking boat "Freya" as used in the film - today located at Chiemsee (Bavaria)

Vicky (Jonas Hämmerle) is the son of Halvar (Waldemar Kobus), chief of the Viking village of Flake. Halvar is a strong and big warrior who measures the strength of people through muscles. Vicky, on the other hand, is a small but very smart boy who always has to prove his father that the ingenuity of a man can meet muscles.

One day the village of Flake falls under attack, and all the children – including Vicky's girlfriend Ylvi (Mercedes Jadea Diaz) – are kidnapped except for Vicky himself, so Vicky, his father Halvar and the other Vikings of the village decide to go out and try to rescue them. The kidnappers turn out to be Sven the Terrible and his band of Viking pirates, who are hunting for a legendary treasure, and in order to gain it, they need the assistance of a child who has never spoken a lie in his or her life. Whilst in pursuit, the Flake Vikings pick up a young Chinese girl and an obnoxious bard (Michael Herbig) for company, and together they succeed in rescuing the children, outsmarting Sven and escaping back to Flake with the treasure (though it is not as bountiful as they might have imagined).

== Cast ==
- Jonas Hämmerle as Vicky
- Waldemar Kobus as Halvar
- Nic Romm as Tjure
- Christian Koch as Snorre
- Olaf Krätke as Urobe
- Mike Maas as Gorm
- Patrick Reichel as Ulme
- Jörg Moukaddam as Faxe
- Mercedes Jadea Diaz as Ylvi
- Sanne Schnapp as Ylva
- Ankie Beilke as Lee Fu
- Günther Kaufmann as Schrecklicher Sven
- Christoph Maria Herbst as Pokka
- Helmfried von Lüttichau as Strickerpirat

=== English dub ===
- John Hasler

== Sequel ==
A sequel, titled Vicky and the Treasure of the Gods, was released in Germany on September 29, 2011. The film was presented in 3D and included the original cast with the exception of Michael Herbig, who was replaced by Christian Ditter.
