= Nic Romm =

German actor

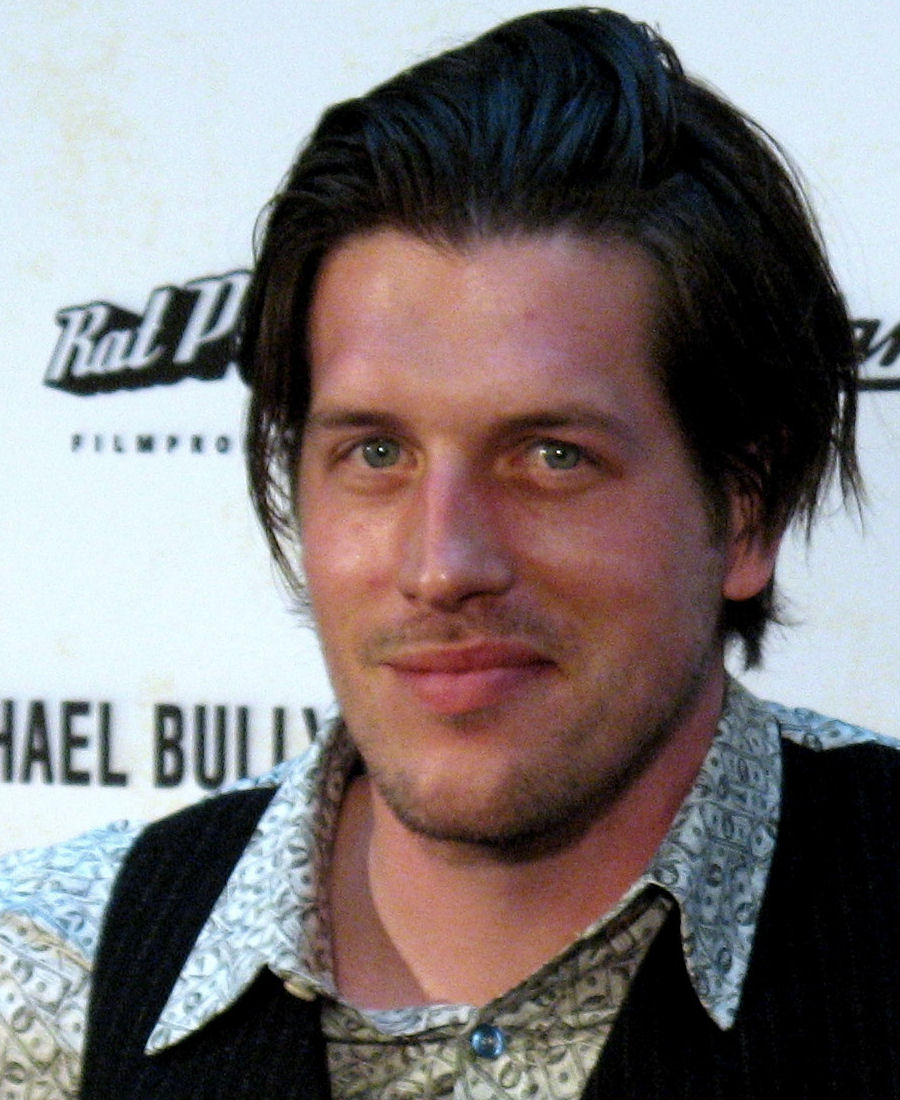
- Born: 1974 (age 51–52); Montreal, Quebec, Canada
- Occupation: Actor
- Years active: 1997–present

Nicolas "Nic" Romm (born 1974) is a German actor.

== Life and work ==
After Nic Romm finished the gymnasium in Jülich, a town in the district of Düren, in the federal state of North Rhine-Westphalia, he visited the Hochschule für Musik und Theater Hannover. There he studied acting from 1997 to 2001. During and since his study Nic Romm appeared in several TV movies and -series and films and took part in a few theatre plays.

In 2008 Nic Romm took part in a casting show, which was arranged by German Film director, actor and author Michael Herbig to find suitable actors for his live-action film adaptation of Vicky the Viking. The show was broadcast from April 2008 to May 2008 on German TV channel Pro7. Nic Romm won the role of Tjure, a Viking.

Nic Romm lives in Berlin.

== Select filmography ==
- 1997: School's Out (TV movie)
- 1999: Ein Fall für zwei (TV series)
- 2000: Crazy
- 2001: Powder Park
- 2001: Hostile Takeover (Feindliche Übernahme – Althan.com)
- 2002: Kolle – Ein Leben für Liebe und Sex (TV movie)
- 2002: Der Wannsee-Mörder (TV movie)
- 2002: Sternenfänger (TV series)
- 2003: In Search of an Impotent Man (Suche impotenten Mann fürs Leben)
- 2003: Die Ritterinnen
- 2003: Northern Star
- 2003: Wilsberg (TV series)
- 2005: Die Pathologin - Im Namen der Toten (TV movie)
- 2005: Stefanie – Eine Frau startet durch (TV series)
- 2005: Lindenstraße (TV series, appeared in five episodes)
- 2005: Das Leben der Philosophen (TV movie)
- 2006: Wortbrot
- 2006: Eine Krone für Isabell (TV movie)
- 2006: Schmitz komm raus (TV series, various characters)
- 2007: Doktor Martin (TV series)
- 2008: Alarm für Cobra 11 (TV series)
- 2009: Vicky the Viking (Wickie und die Starken Männer)
- 2009: Die ProSieben Märchenstunde (TV movie-series)
- 2011: Vicky and the Treasure of the Gods (Wickie auf grosser fahrt)

== Trivia ==
- With film director and actor Daniel Steiner Nic Romm shot a music video for the German musician and singer Namosh.
