= Vic the Viking =

- French DVD cover for Season 1
- Genre: Action; Comedy
- Based on: Vicky the Viking
- Developed by: Jan Van Rijsselberge; Alexander Reverend
- Directed by: Éric Cazes
- Countries of origin: France; Germany; Austria; Netherlands; Australia
- Original languages: English; French; German; Dutch
- No. of seasons: 2
- No. of episodes: 78

Production
- Executive producers: Jim Ballantine; Jérome de Baecque; Katell France; Avrill Stark
- Running time: 10 minutes
- Production companies: ASE Studios Pty Limited; Studio 100 Animation; Flying Bark Productions

Original release
- Network: TF1 (France); ZDF (Germany); ABC3 (Australia) Network Ten (season 1); Eleven (season 2)
- Release: 4 July 2013 – 21 June 2014

Vic the Viking is a children's animated television series, which premiered in 2013 on Network Ten on 4 July, and continued on Eleven on 5 October. It is based on the 1974–1975 anime series Vicky the Viking and the book series it was originally inspired. The show aired 39 episodes for a total of 78 segments, and ended in 2014.

The main characters are Vic, a young, frail and ingenious Viking boy; his father Halvar, the Captain of the Drakkar and chief elect of Flake the home village; Vic's bossy mother Ylva; mischievous urchin-rival Gilby, who is jealous that Vic is allowed to sail with the men, and Vic's equally inquisitive little cousin, Ylvi. Other characters include a druid named Urobe, the ever-quarreling companions Tjure and Snorre, the simple giant Flaxe, squeaky-voiced navigator Gorm and bard Ulme. Halvar's sworn enemy is the rascally captain Sven and his crew of incompetent oafs, but most episodes have other antagonists.

The series has been aired overseas, as in Flanders by Ketnet since autumn 2013 (dubbed in Dutch). In the UK it aired on Pop. There are also two Catalan language dubs, corresponding to Televisió de Catalunya and À Punt Mèdia, in València.

== Cast ==
=== French ===
- Marie Facundo
- Benoît Du Pac
- Magali Rosenzweig
- Lionel Tua
- Cyrille Monge
- Stéphane Ronchewski
- Thierry Kazazian
- Tanguy Goasdoué
- Nathalie Homs

Voice director: Nathalie Homs

Voice recording studio: Piste Rouge

=== English ===
- Kirstie Hutton as Vic and Ylvi
- Peter Callan as Captain Halvar
- Jane U'Brien as Ylva and Gilby
- Paul Davies as Urobe, Tjure and Sven
- Cam Ralph as Ulme, Faxe and Pox
- David Callan as Snorre and Gorm

== Series overview ==
Series	Episodes	Originally released	
Series	Episodes	First released	Last released
1	26	4 July 2013	28 September 2013
2	52	5 October 2013	21 June 2014

=== Season 1 (2013) ===
No. overall	No. in season	Title	Directed by	Written by	Original release date
1	1	"Almost Treasure's Island"	Éric Cazes	Thierry Gaudin	4 July 2013
2	2	"Thor's Thunder"	Éric Cazes	Fabienne Gambrelle	4 July 2013
3	3	"Grist for the Mill"	Éric Cazes	Fabienne Gambrelle	11 July 2013
4	4	"The Magic Lantern"	Éric Cazes	Hadrien Soulez Larivière	11 July 2013
5	5	"Shooting Star"	Éric Cazes	Alexandre Révérend	18 July 2013
6	6	"The Highest Viking"	Éric Cazes	Alexandre Révérend	18 July 2013
7	7	"A Wind That'll Tear the Horns Off a Viking"	Éric Cazes	Alexandre Révérend	27 July 2013
8	8	"Knock on Wood"	Éric Cazes	Robin Lyons & Andrew Offiler	27 July 2013
9	9	"Trials of Halvar"	Éric Cazes	Robin Lyons & Andrew Offiler	29 July 2013
10	10	"The Monster"	Éric Cazes	Bettina Janischowski	29 July 2013
11	11	"Dagda's Cauldron"	Éric Cazes	Pascal Mirleau & Tony Scott	6 August 2013
12	12	"Beware of the Wolf"	Marc Wasik	Laurent Auclair	6 August 2013
13	13	"Judgement of Thor"	Éric Cazes	Robin Lyons & Andrew Offiler	12 August 2013
14	14	"Shape Shifting"	Éric Cazes	Robin Lyons & Andrew Offiler	12 August 2013
15	15	"Good Luck Charm"	Éric Cazes	Robin Lyons & Andrew Offiler	24 August 2013
16	16	"Son of Tjure"	Éric Cazes	Thierry Gaudin	24 August 2013
17	17	"Faxe and the Whale"	Marc Wasik	Kym Goldsworthy	31 August 2013
18	18	"Shallow Waters"	Marc Wasik	Matt Phipps	31 August 2013
19	19	"Taken"	Éric Cazes	Valérie Magis	7 September 2013
20	20	"Snorre Soaps Up"	Éric Cazes	Max Mamoud & Georges Tzanos	7 September 2013
21	21	"Stardust"	Éric Cazes	Michel Coulon & Fabienne Gambrelle	14 September 2013
22	22	"Ylva in Charge"	Marc Wasik	Rob George	14 September 2013
23	23	"Free Ylvi"	Marc Wasik	Cleon Prineas	21 September 2013
24	24	"The Tunnel"	Marc Wasik	Laurent Auclair	21 September 2013
25	25	"Andalusia"	Marc Wasik	Sam Meikle	28 September 2013
26	26	"Captain Gilby"	Éric Cazes	Fabienne Gambrelle	28 September 2013

=== Season 2 (2013–14) ===
No. overall	No. in season	Title	Directed by	Written by	Original release date
27	1	"The Canal"	Marc Wasik	Fin Edquist	5 October 2013
28	2	"The Invisible Treasure"	Éric Cazes	Roland Fauzer	5 October 2013
29	3	"A True Viking"	Marc Wasik	Cleon Prineas	12 October 2013
30	4	"Stink Bugs Attack"	Marc Wasik	Sean Nash	12 October 2013
31	5	"Gorm's Seagull"	Éric Cazes	Pascal Mirleau & Tony Scott	17 October 2013
32	6	"Chicken Pox"	Éric Cazes	Bettina Janischowski & Laurent Auclair	17 October 2013
33	7	"Victory Dance"	Marc Wasik	Cleon Prineas	24 October 2013
34	8	"The Forgotten Treasure"	Éric Cazes	Pascal Mirleau & Tony Scott	24 October 2013
35	9	"The Hammer in the Stone"	Marc Wasik	John Armstrong	2 November 2013
36	10	"The Cavern of Frozen Words"	Éric Cazes	Alexandre Révérend & Laurent Auclair	2 November 2013
37	11	"Sparkling Race"	Éric Cazes	Augusto Zanovello & Laurent Auclair	9 November 2013
38	12	"The Druid Needs a Ride"	Marc Wasik	Sean Nash	9 November 2013
39	13	"Siren Song"	Éric Cazes	Robin Lyons & Andrew Offiler	16 November 2013
40	14	"Castaways"	Marc Wasik	Laurent Auclair	16 November 2013
41	15	"He's My Son"	Éric Cazes	Alexandre Révérend & Laurent Auclair	6 March 2014
42	16	"Topsy Turvy"	Éric Cazes	Bruno Dupuis	12 March 2014
43	17	"Dance with the Wolf"	Éric Cazes	Valérie Magis & Laurent Auclair	12 March 2014
44	18	"Bear Up"	Éric Cazes	Jenz Opatz & Laurent Auclair	19 March 2014
45	19	"Silent Night"	Marc Wasik	David Evans	19 March 2014
46	20	"The Thief Among Us"	Marc Wasik	Sam Meikle	26 March 2014
47	21	"Trojan Snorre"	Marc Wasik	Suzie Wicks	26 March 2014
48	22	"Resort Island"	Éric Cazes	Bruno Dupuis	2 April 2014
49	23	"Trouble in Flake"	Éric Cazes	Jeffrey Kearney	2 April 2014
50	24	"The Julbock"	Éric Cazes	Robin Lyons & Andrew Offiler	9 April 2014
51	25	"War of the Berries"	Marc Wasik	Rob George	9 April 2014
52	26	"Arabian Nights"	Marc Wasik	Fin Edquist	9 April 2014
53	27	"Use Your Loaf"	Éric Cazes	Robin Lyons & Andrew Offiler	19 April 2014
54	28	"Licence to Sail"	Éric Cazes	Simon Lecocq	19 April 2014
55	29	"Princess Badoura"	Marc Wasik	Charlotte Hamlyn	26 April 2014
56	30	"Loki the Trickster God"	Marc Wasik	Charlotte Hamlyn	26 April 2014
57	31	"The Kraken"	Marc Wasik	Laurent Auclair & Zoe Harrington	3 May 2014
58	32	"The Olympic Games"	Marc Wasik	Sam Meikle	3 May 2014
59	33	"Stronger Together"	Éric Cazes	Sébastien Viaud	10 May 2014
60	34	"It's Not What You Sink"	Éric Cazes	Laurent Auclair	10 May 2014
61	35	"Moby Vic"	Éric Cazes	Bruno Dupuis	17 May 2014
62	36	"Oops a Daisy"	Éric Cazes	Robin Lyons & Andrew Offiler	17 May 2014
63	37	"Cow Express"	Éric Cazes	Thierry Soufflard	24 May 2014
64	38	"Grandpa Olaf"	Éric Cazes	Simon Lecocq	24 May 2014
65	39	"Mushroom Picking"	Éric Cazes	Marguerite Sauvage	31 May 2014
66	40	"The Tree House"	Éric Cazes	Marguerite Sauvage	31 May 2014
67	41	"Mistaken Eye-dentity"	Éric Cazes	Jeffrey Kearney & Laurent Auclair	7 June 2014
68	42	"Gilby the Pirate"	Éric Cazes	Marguerite Sauvage	7 June 2014
69	43	"Being a Leprechaun"	Éric Cazes	Anne Ricaud & Johanna Krawczyk	14 June 2014
70	44	"For the Love of Cake"	Éric Cazes	Bruno Dupuis	14 June 2014
71	45	"Who Let the Bear In"	Éric Cazes	Sébastien Viaud	21 June 2014
72	46	"Summer Residence"	Éric Cazes	Bruno Dupuis	21 June 2014
73	47	"Bamboo Surprise"	Marc Wasik	Sam Meikle	19 April 2014
74	48	"Up the River"	Éric Cazes	Laurent Auclair	20 April 2014
75	49	"The Invisible Sword"	Éric Cazes	Anastasia Heinzl	20 April 2014
76	50	"Back to Flake"	Éric Cazes	Bruno Dupuis	20 April 2014
77–78	51–52	"Strangers in a Strange Land"	Marc Wasik	Cleon Prineas	19 April 2014

== Production ==
Development of the series began in 2011, when Studio 100 launched its French animation division Studio 100 Animation to produce revivals of classics like Vicky the Viking back in 2009. The series was ordered when French broadcaster TF1 and German network ZDF (which aired the 1974 anime) had commissioned the series to air the series in its home countries.

The series became a French/Australian co-production in 2013 when Australian broadcasting networks Network Ten and Australian Broadcasting Corporation had ordered a revival of the classic 1974 anime series titled Vic the Viking and Australian animation studio Flying Bark Productions co-produced the series with Studio 100 Animation while Arvill Stark's entertainment company ASE Studios came aboard as co-producer.
