= Rat Pack Filmproduktion =

German film production company

- Type: Subsidiary
- Industry: Film
- Founded: 2001; 25 years ago
- Headquarters: Munich, Germany
- Products: Feature films
- Parent: Constantin Film
- Website: https://www.ratpack-film.de/

Rat Pack Filmproduktion GmbH is a German film & television production company owned by Constantin Film. In 2021, they released Germany's most successful Netflix film to date, the horror thriller Blood Red Sky.

== History ==
Rat Pack Filmproduktion GmbH was founded by Christian Becker with Anita Schneider, Jürgen Egger, Alexander Rümelin, Catarina Raacke and Constantin Film in January, 2001 in Munich, Germany. Inspired by the "Rat Pack" of the 50s/ 60s, the company logo also consists of curved letters reminiscent of the lettering of the sixties or large casinos. The animated Rat Pack logo in the opening credits of the films, the so-called trademark and brand name of Rat Pack, is thereby completely changed or adapted as a recurring gag for cineastes in each theatrical film to match the type of film. The logo is also used in the films as a gimmick.

== Selected films by Rat Pack Film Production ==
- Cassandra (2025) Production Company
- Blood Red Sky (2021) Production Company
- Jim Button and the Wild 13 (2020) Production Company
- The Magic Kids: Three Unlikely Heroes (2020) Production Company
- Jim Button and Luke the Engine Driver (2017) Production Company
- Winnetou (2016, TV film) Production Company
- Stung (2015) Production Company
- Mara and the Firebringer (2015) Production Company
- Fack ju Göhte (2013) Production Company
- Kalkofes Mattscheibe - Rekalked (2012-2014, TV) Production Company
- Agent Ranjid rettet die Welt (2012) Production Company
- Victor and the Secret of Crocodile Mansion (2012) Production Company
- Turkish for Beginners (2012) Production Company
- Vicky and the Treasure of the Gods (2011) Production Company
- We Are the Night (2010) Production Company
- Jerry Cotton (2010) Production Company
- Zeiten ändern Dich (2010) Production Company (co-production)
- The Crocodiles Strike Back (2010) Production Company
- Vicky the Viking (2009) Production Company
- Die Legende von Loch Ness (2010, TV) Production Company
- The Crocodiles (2009) Production Company (co-production)
- Mord ist mein Geschäft, Liebling (2009) Production Company
- ProSieben FunnyMovies (2008–2010, TV) Production Company
- The Secret of Loch Ness (2008, TV) Production Company
- The Wave (2008) Production Company
- Die ProSieben Märchenstunde (2006–2009, TV) Production Company
- Neues vom Wixxer (2007) Production Company
- Hui Buh: The Goofy Ghost (2006) Production Company
- French for Beginners (2006) Production Company (co-production)
- Lotta in Love (2006, TV) Production Company
- Der Wixxer (2004) Production Company
- Blood of the Templars (2004, TV) Production Company
- Ratten 2 - Sie kommen wieder! (2004, TV) Production Company
- Mädchen Nr. 1 (2003, TV) Production Company
- Nikos (2003, V) Production Company
- The Hunt for the Hidden Relic (2002, TV) Production Company
- Kubaner küssen besser (2002, TV) Production Company
- Alles getürkt! (2002, TV) Production Company
- Kalkofes Mattscheibe (2001–2009, TV) Production Company
