= Vicky and the Treasure of the Gods =

2011 film

- Theatrical release poster
- Directed by: Christian Ditter
- Written by: Christian Ditter; Runer Jonsson
- Produced by: Christian Becker
- Starring: Jonas Hämmerle
- Cinematography: Christian Rein
- Edited by: Ueli Christen
- Production company: Rat Pack Filmproduktion
- Distributed by: Constantin Film
- Release date: 29 September 2011
- Running time: 96 minutes
- Country: Germany
- Language: German
- Box office: $20,7 million

Vicky and the Treasure of the Gods (German: Wickie auf großer Fahrt) is a 2011 German 3D adventure film directed by Christian Ditter. It is the sequel to the 2009 film Vicky the Viking.

== Plot ==
During a raid on an English encampment by the Vikings from Flake, Vicky frees a bunch of Inuit. After they flee, he notices that one of them left a diary behind. After close inspection of the diary, Vicky realises that the "Chefs Amulet" worn by Halvar and passed down after generations is actually the key to the "Ice Fortress" in Greenland, where the treasure of the gods allegedly is hidden. At night however, Halvar gets captured by Sven the Terrible, so Vicky, as his descendant, has to guide the Vikings to the "Canyon of Odin", where Svens fortress is located. With them comes a girl called Svenja, which later turns out to be Svens daughter. After freeing Halvar and escaping through the canyon to Greenland, they arrive at the Ice Fortress shortly after Sven. It turns out that they can only find the treasure if they solve the riddle in the diary. Vicky is forced to solve the riddle for Sven, which grants him access to the treasure: Mjölnir (Thor's hammer). Sven then proceeds to taze Halvar and heat up the environment. As he tries to silence Halver for good however, Vicky pulls a shield in front of him. The lightning deflects of the shield and hits Sven instead, causing him to dangle of an edge. He tells his daughter to finish the two, but Svenja, who has become frenemies with Vicky, throws the hammer into a chasm. Halvar helps Sven up with a few requirements, and together they escape the melting Ice Fortress. The Vikings give Svens tied up crew as slaves to the Inuit.

== Cast ==
- Jonas Hämmerle as Vicky
- Waldemar Kobus as Halvar
- Valeria Eisenbart as Svenja
- Günther Kaufmann as the Schreckliche Sven
- Nic Romm as Tjure
- Christian Koch as Snorre
- Olaf Krätke as Urobe
- Mike Maas as Gorm
- Patrick Reichel as Ulme
- Jörg Moukaddam as Faxe
- Hoang Dang-Vu as Yogi
- Mercedes Jadea Diaz as Ylvi
- Sanne Schnapp as Alva
- Christoph Maria Herbst as Pokka
- David Torok as Knight
- Jacob Matschenz as Dungeon Guard (Kerkerwächter) 1
- Elyas M'Barek as Dungeon Guard (Kerkerwächter) 2
