= Marcel Keller Gil =

Portuguese volleyball player (born 1990)

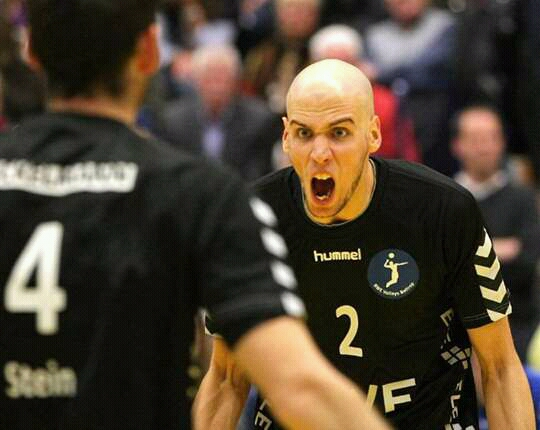
- Gil in 2012

Personal information
- Nationality: Portuguese
- Born: 8 May 1990 (age 36); Lisbon
- Height: 208 cm (6 ft 10 in)
- Weight: 94 kg (207 lb)
- Spike: 352 cm (139 in)
- Block: 333 cm (131 in)

Volleyball information
- Position: Middle Blocker

Career
Years	Teams
2017/18; 2016/17; 2015/16; 2014/15; 2013/14; 2012/13; 2011/12; 2010/11; 2009/10; 2008/09; 2006/08; 2004/06	AUT Raiffeisen Waldviertel; ROU SCM U Craiova; ARG Monteros Vóley Club; FRA Beauvais Oise Université; POR Sport Lisboa e Benfica; GER RWE Volleys Bottrop; POR S.C. Espinho; ESP Palma Voley; POR S.C Caldas; POR A.A. São Mamede; POR S.C.Espinho; POR Sport Lisboa e Benfica

National team
2005	Portugal

Marcel Keller Gil (born 8 May 1990) is a Portuguese indoor volleyball player who played professionally until 2018.

He played for clubs in Portugal, Spain, Germany, France, Argentina, Romania and Austria. as well as over 200 matches for the Portuguese national team at youth, junior and senior levels.

He played for Portugal in the European League in 2009, in which they won the Bronze Medal and in the following year, when they won Gold. In the following eight years, he played World League (2011, 2012, 2013, 2014. 2015. 2016, 2017, 2018).
