= Runer Jonsson =

Swedish writer

- Born: June 29, 1916
- Died: October 29, 2006 (aged 90)
- Occupations: Journalist and writer

Runer Jonsson (29 June 1916 — 29 October 2006) was a Swedish journalist and author. He was editor of Nybro Tidning and the author of the Vicke Viking series of children's books adapted into the animated series Vicky the Viking. At the age of 13, Jonsson was already working for the newspaper Nybro Tidning, and at 19 he became its sole editor in 1936. In this position, he distinguished himself primarily by harsh criticism of National Socialism.

== Works ==
- Släpp farmor och kusinerna! (1970)
- Vad ger ni för Johan? (1971)
- Göran i riddarskolan (1972)
- Demonstranterna (1978)
- Kung Karls trosspojke (1980)
- Min gode vän Rånaren (1981)
- Jens, jag och unionen (1982)
- Det finns inga matchhjältar (1983)
- Den röda baskern (1993)

== Awards ==
- 1965: German Youth Literature Award
- 1970: Landstingets kulturpris
- 1984: Litteraturfrämjandets stora pris
- 1996: Emil-priset
