= Heidi (given name) =

- Pronunciation: /ˈhaɪdi/
- Gender: Female
- Language: German

Origin
- Meaning: Nobility

Other names
- Alternative spelling: Heidy, Hidi, Hydie
- Variant forms: Heidrun, Heidelinde and Heidemarie
- Related names: Adelheid, Adelaide, Heide

Heidi is a Germanic feminine given name. It became an internationally popular first name as a direct result of the Swiss children's book, Heidi. It can sometimes be an affectionate diminutive of the name Adelheid (the German form of the English Adelaide), which means "nobility" or, more loosely, "of noble birth". The name began to be used in the English-speaking world shortly after the 1937 Shirley Temple movie adaptation of the novel. In German-speaking countries, Heidi is also used as a diminutive for other names, such as Heidrun, Heidelinde, and Heidemarie.

== People with the given name ==
- Heidi Abel (1929–1986), Swiss television personality
- Heidi Alexander (born 1975), British politician
- Heidi Allen (born 1975), British politician
- Heidi Andersson (born 1981), Swedish armwrestler
- Heidi Andreasen (born 1985), Faroese swimmer
- Heidi Androl (born 1980), candidate for The Apprentice:Los Angeles (US Season 6, 2005)
- Heidi Astrup (born 1972), Danish handball player
- Heidi Baker (born 1959), American missionary in Africa
- Heidi Balderree, American politician
- Heidi Barrett (born 1958), Californian winemaker
- Heidi Becker-Ramlow (1954–1987), German Olympic diver
- Heidi Behrens-Benedict, American politician
- Heidi Berry (born 1958), American singer-songwriter
- Heidi Biebl (1941–2022), German alpine skier
- Heidi Blickenstaff (born 1971), American actress
- Heidi Bohay (born 1959), American actress
- Heidi Burge (born 1971), American basketball player
- Heidi Cammerlander (born 1942), Austrian politician
- Heidi Chu (born 1977), Miss Hong Kong contestant
- Heidi Collins (born 1967), American correspondent and news anchor
- Heidi Cortez (born 1981), American model
- Heidi Crowter, English disability rights advocate
- Heidi W. Durrow (born 1969), American author
- Heidi-Elke Gaugel (born 1959), German athlete
- Heidi Li Feldman, American law professor
- Heidi Fleiss (born 1965), former American procuress
- Heidi Foss, Canadian TV writer
- Heidi Gardner (born 1983), American actress and comedian
- Heidi Grande Røys (born 1967), Norwegian politician
- Heidi Groskreutz (born 1981), American ballroom dancer
- Heidi Hadsell, former president of Hartford Seminary
- Heidi Hanselmann (born 1961), Swiss politician
- Heidi Harley (born 1969), American linguist
- Heidi Harris, American radio personality
- Heidi Hautala (born 1955), Finnish politician
- Heidi Hazell (1962–1989), German murder victim
- Heidi Heitkamp (born 1955), American lawyer, and politician
- Heidi Herzon, American TV producer
- Heidi Hollinger (born 1968), Canadian photographer
- Heidi Honeycutt, American film journalist, actress, and film programmer
- Heidi Jensen (born 1966), Danish retired middle-distance runner
- Heidi Julavits (born 1969), American author
- Heidi Kabel (1914–2010), German musician and actress
- Heidi Klum (born 1973), German model
- Heidi Kozak (born 1963), American actress
- Heidi Larssen (born 1951), Norwegian politician
- Heidi Lee, Hong Kong singer
- Heidi Lenhart (born 1973), American actress
- Heidi Lucas (born 1977), American actress
- Heidi Lück (born 1943), German politician
- Heidi Løke (born 1982), Norwegian handball player
- Heidi MacDonald, American journalist
- Heidi Mark (born 1971), American Playboy Playmate
- Heidi Marx, Professor of Religion at the University of Manitoba
- Heidi Miller (born 1950s), American female bodybuilder
- Heidi Safia Mirza (born 1958), British academic
- Heidi Mohr (1967–2019), German footballer
- Heidi Montag (born 1986), American television personality
- Heidi Lee Morgan (born 1967), American female professional wrestler
- Heidi Mueller (born 1982), American actress
- Heidi Murkoff, American author
- Heidi Neumark (born 1954), American spiritual writer
- Heidi Newfield (born 1970), American country music singer and former frontwoman of "Trick Pony"
- Heidi Nordby Lunde (born 1973), Norwegian politician
- Heidi Parviainen (born 1979), Finnish singer and songwriter
- Heidi Pelttari (born 1985), Finnish ice hockey player
- Heidi Postlewait, former UN social worker
- Heidi Puurula (born 1971), Finnish singer
- Heidi Rakels (born 1968), Belgian judoka
- Heidi Range (born 1983), member of British girl group Sugababes
- Heidi Ravven (born 1952), American professor
- Heidi Roizen (born 1958), American businesswoman
- Heidi Ruth (born 1996), American soccer player
- Heidi Ryom (1955–2013), Danish ballerina and educator
- Heidi Saadiya, Indian journalist and YouTuber
- Heidi Sager (1939–2004), German-Australian canoeist
- Heidi Schanz (born 1972/1973), American-German actress
- Heidi Schmid (born 1938), German fencer
- Heidi Schüller (born 1950), German athlete
- Heidi Shepherd, American singer
- Heidi Sørensen (1970–2026), Danish-Norwegian politician
- Heidi Sorenson (born 1960), Danish-Canadian Playboy Playmate
- Heidi Soulsby, British politician from Guernsey
- Heidi Steltzer, German-born American scientist
- Heidi Støre (born 1963), Norwegian footballer
- Heidi Sundal (born 1962), Norwegian handball player
- Heidi Swedberg (born 1966), American actress
- Heidi Talbot (born 1980), Irish folk singer
- Heidi Thomas (born 1962), English screenwriter and playwright
- Heidi Tjugum (born 1973), Norwegian handball player
- Heidi Valkenburg, Australian actress
- Heidi Vanderbilt (1948–2021), American actress, photographer, and writer
- Heidi VanDerveer (born 1964), American basketball coach
- Heidi von Beltz (1955–2015), German American stuntwoman championship skier, stuntwoman, and actress
- Heidi von Born (1936–2018), Swedish writer and translator
- Heidi Von Gunden, American musicologist
- Heidi Weisel (1961/1962–2021), American fashion designer
- Heidi Weng (born 1991), Norwegian cross-country skier
- Heidi Williams (born 1981), American attorney and judge
- Heidi Wunderli-Allenspach (born 1947), Swiss biologist and first women rector of ETH Zurich
- Heidi Yuen (born 1992), Hong Kong athlete
- Heidi Zeigler (born 1979), American child actress
- Heidi Zeller-Bähler (born 1967), Swiss alpine skier
- Heidi Zimmer, American deaf mountain climber
- Heidi Zurbriggen (born 1967), Swiss alpine skier
- Heidy Forero (died 1990), American female murder victim

== Fictional characters with the given name ==
- Heidi Doody, in American children's TV program Howdy Doody
- Heidi Keppert, in Home Improvement
- Heidi Turner, in South Park animated TV series
- Heidi, the titular character of the Swiss children's novel
