= Hedy =

- Language: German

Other names
- Variant form: Hedwig

Hedy (/ˈhɛdi/) is a German given name, sometimes a diminutive form of Hedwig.

Notable people with the name include:

- Hedy Bienenfeld (1907–1976), Austrian-American Olympic swimmer
- Hedy Burress (born c. 1973), American actress
- Hedy d'Ancona (born 1937), Dutch politician, geographer, and sociologist
- Hedy Epstein (1924–2016), German-born Jewish-American political activist
- Hedy Frank-Autheried (1902–1979), Austrian composer
- Hedy Fry (born 1941), Trinidadian-Canadian politician and physician
- Hedy Graf (1926–1997), Spanish-born Swiss classically trained soprano
- Hedy Hahnloser-Bühler (1873–1952), Swiss painter, craftswoman, art collector
- Hedy Iracema-Brügelmann (1879–1941), German operatic soprano of Brazilian birth
- Hedy Klineman, American painter
- Hedy Lamarr (1914–2000), Austrian-American film actress and inventor
- Hedy Rijken (born 1957 or 1958), American politician of Dutch-Indonesian descent
- Hedy Schlunegger (1923–2003), Swiss alpine skier
- Hedy Stenuf (1922–2010), Austrian figure skater who later competed for France and the United States
- Hedy West (1938–2005), American folksinger and songwriter

== Fictional characters ==
- Hedy (opera)

== See also ==
- Heide (disambiguation)
- Heidi (disambiguation)
