= Heidi (disambiguation) =

Heidi is a novel by Johanna Spyri.

Heidi may also refer to:

== Arts and entertainment ==
=== Film and television ===
- Heidi (1937 film), starring Shirley Temple
- Heidi (1952 film), a Swiss family drama
- Heidi (1965 film), an Austrian family film
- Heidi (1968 film), starring Jennifer Edwards
  - Heidi Game, a 1968 AFL game whose TV broadcast was prematurely terminated for the film
- Heidi, Girl of the Alps, a 1974 Japanese anime series
- Heidi (miniseries), a 1993 Disney TV miniseries
- Heidi (1978 TV series). 1980 UK release.
- Heidi (1995 film), by Jetlag Productions
- "Heidi", two 2001 episodes of Langt fra Las Vegas
- Heidi (2005 animated film), in German
- Heidi (2005 live-action film), a British family film
- Heidi (2015 film), a Swiss family film
- Heidi (2015 TV series), an animated children's TV series, first screened 2007
- Heidi: Rescue of the Lynx, a 2025 German animated film

=== Music ===
- "Heidi" (song), 1977 anime theme song
- Heidi, 1979 album by Heidi Stern, later known as Jennifer Rush
- Heidi (band), a Japanese rock band

== People ==
- Heidi (given name), including a list of people and fictional characters with the name

== Other uses ==
- 2521 Heidi, an asteroid named after the novel
- Heidi (opossum), the name of an animal at Leipzig Zoo
- Cyclone Heidi, that struck Western Australia in January 2012
- heidi.com, a defunct Swiss clothing company
- Heidi (god), a deity in Chinese religion
- HeidiSQL, a free and open-source administration tool for a variety of databases

== See also ==
- Heide (disambiguation)
