= Hanselmann =

Hanselmann is a German surname. Notable people with the surname include:

- Élizabeth Teissier (née Germaine Élizabeth Hanselmann, born 1938), French astrologer and former model and actress
- Heidi Hanselmann (born 1961), Swiss politician
- Knut Hanselmann (1946–2022), Norwegian politician
- Rony Hanselmann (born 1991), Liechtenstein footballer
- Simon Hanselmann (born 1981), Australian cartoonist
- Simone Hanselmann (born 1979), German actress
- Thomas Hanselmann (born 1976), Liechtenstein footballer

== See also ==
- Hanselman
