= Heide (name) =

Heide is a surname and feminine given name. Heide is a German and Dutch word meaning 'heath'.

== Notable people with the surname ==
- Camden Heide (born 2003), American basketball player
- Ella Heide (1871–1956), Danish painter
- Frits Heide (1883–1957), Danish botanist
- Florence Parry Heide (1919–2011), American children's writer
- Gustavo Heide (born 2002), Brazilian tennis player
- Hermann auf der Heide (1911–1984), German field hockey player
- Marco Heide (born 1988), German politician
- Michael von der Heide (born 1971), Swiss musician, singer, and actor
- Oscar Louis Auf der Heide (1874–1945), American politician
- Ola Heide (born 1931), Norwegian botanist
- Raoul Heide (1888–1978), Norwegian fencer
- Ruud ter Heide (born 1982), Dutch association football player
- Tami Heide, American radio personality
- Wilma Scott Heide (1921–1985), American feminist author and social activist

== Notable people with the given name ==
- Heide Banks, psychotherapist, celebrity relationship expert
- Heide Boikat, West German slalom canoeist
- Heide-Elke Gaugel (born 1959), German sprinter
- Heide Hatry (born 1965), German artist, curator and editor
- Heide Orth (born 1942), German tennis player
- Heide Perlman (born 1951), American television script writer
- Heidemarie Rosendahl (born 1947), German track and field athlete
- Heide Rühle (born 1948), German politician
- Heide Schröter, West German slalom canoeist
- Heide Schmidt (born 1948), Austrian politician
- Heide Seyerling (born 1976), South African sprinter
- Heide Simonis (1943–2023), German politician
- Heide Wollert (born 1982), German judoka

== See also ==
- Heide (disambiguation)
- Van der Heide, Dutch toponymic surname
- Von der Heide, German toponymic surname
- Heidi (given name), similar but unrelated name
- Heyde, surname
