= Hanselman =

Hanselman is a surname. Notable people with the surname include:

- Hanselman sextuplets (born 2004)
- Richard W. Hanselman (1927–2021), American businessman
- W. Hanselman, Egyptian photographer

== See also ==
- Hanselmann
