= Heyde =

Heyde is a surname. Notable people with the surname include:

- Chris Heyde (1939–2008), Australian statistician
- Erich von der Heyde (1900–1984), German SS official acquitted of war crimes
- Gustav von der Heyde (1836–1891), New Zealand politician
- Lucina von der Heyde (born 1997), Argentine field hockey player
- Maria Heyde (1837–1917), Surinamese-born German missionary, writer and translator
- Nikolai van der Heyde (1935–2020), Dutch film director and screenwriter
- Werner Heyde (1902—1964), German Nazi psychiatrist involved in Action T4

== See also ==
- Heide (name)
- Heide (disambiguation)
- Heyd
