= Heyd =

Heyd is a surname. Notable people with this surname include:

- Heyd family of Nuremberg, 16th and 17th century German family of musicians, musical instrument makers, and copper merchants
- Charles Bernhard Heyd (1842–1929), Canadian politician
- Charles G. Heyd (1884–1970), American surgeon
- Christian Heyd (born 1878), Swiss football player
- Matthew Heyd, American Episcopal priest

== See also ==
- Heyde
