= Heidi Steltzer =

German born scientist of arctic and alpine ecology

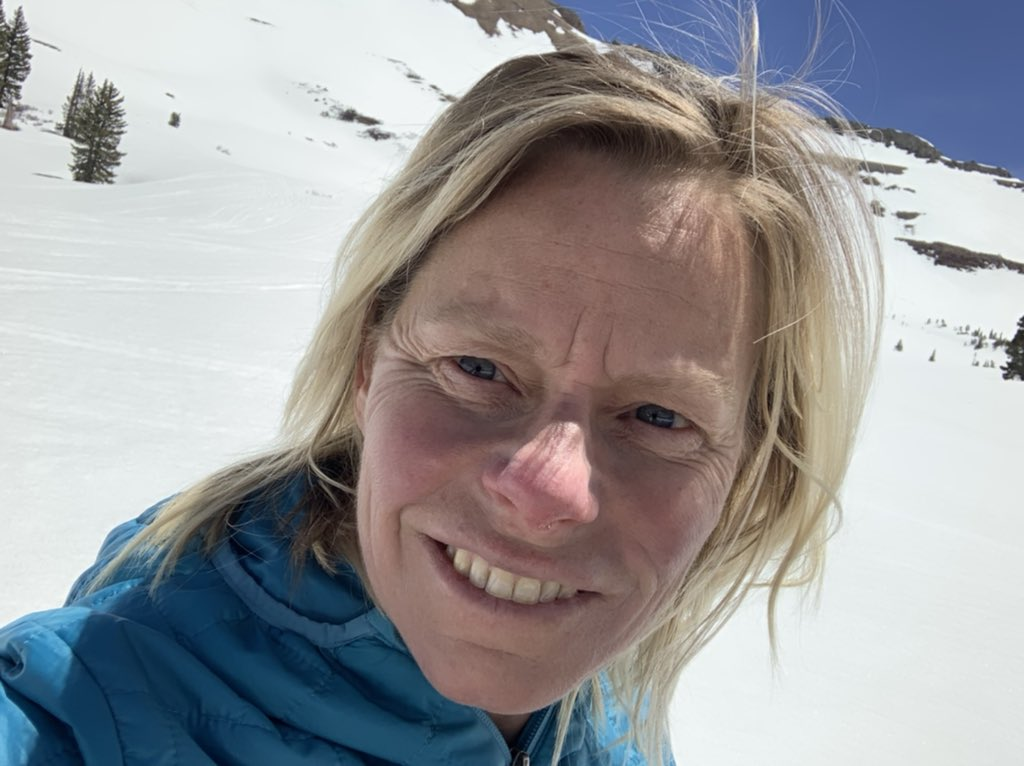
- Born: 1972 (age 53–54); Wuppertal, Germany
- Education: Duke University; University of Colorado Boulder
- Awards: 2019 – Stuart Allen "Stu" Roosa Honoree – Powerhouse Science Center 2013 – Sulzman Award for Excellence in Education and Mentoring – The American Geophysical Union
- Scientific career
- Fields: Ecology, biology, environmental science, sustainability
- Workplaces: Fort Lewis College, Durango, Colorado
- Website: heidisteltzer.com

Heidi Steltzer is a German-born American scientist of arctic and alpine ecology and professor at Fort Lewis College in Durango, Colorado teaching Biology and Environment and Sustainability. Steltzer is known for her work on snow melt and how it affects ecosystems in the surrounding areas.

== Early life and education ==
Steltzer fantasized when she was young about going into Marine Biology and spending her days in the tropics. She found out in early adulthood that the heat wasn't for her, and the mountains was where she belonged. Thus, when beginning her career, she found herself in Colorado. Steltzer attended Duke University for her undergraduate degree, earning a diploma for a Bachelor of Science in biology. She went on to receive a Ph.D. at the University of Colorado Boulder. She then began studying the Arctic through a postdoctoral research position at Colorado State University in Fort Collins, Colorado.

== Career and research ==
Steltzer is currently employed as a professor at Fort Lewis College where she has been teaching since 2009. She is currently a professor of biology, environment, and sustainability, and is coordinator for the program.

Steltzer's research revolves mostly around alpine and arctic ecology, looking at snow and how the changing climate affects water availability. Steltzer began her research in Gothic, Colorado at the Rocky Mountain Biology Laboratory. Her research led to her be nominated as a writer for the 2019 IPCC report called "The Ocean and Cryosphere in a Changing Climate." Steltzer lead-authored the chapter regarding alpine ecosystems. The IPCC, or Intergovernmental Panel on Climate Change, is an extension of the United Nations that works to understand how the earth and its inhabitants are affected by a changing climate. Steltzer's team looked specifically at how warming temperatures affect the supplies of Earth's water, particularly recession of glacial ice, permafrost thaw, and changes in snow melt. Evidence was compiled from many peer-reviewed studies of various regions, showing consistency in the results. They found that snowfall was in fact decreasing and was resulting in a shorter seasons. The report then suggests action to be taken.

She was also part of a study which simulated the effects of early snow melting and the implications it has for water traveling and the ecosystem in which it takes place. This project is part of a massive project funded by the U.S. Department of Energy which attempts to explain the hydrology of the area and the impacts climate change is having on it. Steltzer's work also examines how much water plants affected by run off are taking in and giving off into the atmosphere depending on snow melt conditions. Steltzer stresses the importance of the property of snow to "seep". This allows for gradual distribution of water, which is more valuable than the sudden arrival of rain waters.

Steltzer's has also done a significant amount of work on decomposition in soil. One of her most cited works is a peer reviewed article entitled "Home-field advantage accelerates leaf litter decomposition in forests" which aimed to find if there was a difference in decomposition speeds depending on what type of plant litter leaves were deposited in. Through multiple transplant experiments, they found that lying in the litter of a leaf's own species accelerated the rate at which the leaves decompose, which they referred to as the home-field advantage. It also discussed that there was a potential for climate change to interrupt this process as migration patterns of plants and animals shift.

Steltzer transitioned from working on decomposition to studying snow when an opportunity with the Center for Snow and Avalanche Studies arose, providing her with the means to research as a board member. She found that her passion lied in that work.

== Honors and awards ==
2019 – Steltzer was named the Stuart Allen "Stu" Roosa Honoree, awarded by the Powerhouse Science Center.

2013 – The American Geophysical Union, a group aimed at facilitating scientific exploration, honored Steltzer with Sulzman Award for Excellence in Education and Mentoring.

== Public engagement ==
Steltzer serves on the board for various environmental research groups, such as the Center for Snow and Avalanche Studies. The CSAS conducts studies by connecting researchers of different backgrounds in order to obtain and analyze data that could have impacts on high mountain regions. The CSAS gained Steltzer's support while attempting to diversify their board. This opportunity gave her the chance to work with Chris Landry, the director at the time, on a project studying snow melt rates in the San Juan Mountains. She also works with the Western Alliance for Restoration Management, whose goal is to protect headwaters which are under threat due to contamination from Colorado's many mines. She also serves the Watershed Function Scientific Focus Area as a co-principal investigator. The Watershed Function SFA attempts to make predictive models about how a warming climate will affect water availability.

In early 2020, Steltzer spoke on how climate change is having drastic impacts on the cryosphere before the US House Committee on Science, Space, and Technology. She addressed the House as a witness for the official hearing which called for an update on the climate crisis. Steltzer was one of five experts called in to speak about this environmental issue. The other scientists called were Pamela McElwee, Richard Murray, Michael Shellenberger, and Taryn Fransen. Steltzer stressed the importance of untouched or unaltered land in the fight against climate change. She stressed also that funding is imperative for the fight to preserve and restore land.

== Publications ==
- Ayres, E., Steltzer, H. et al. (2009). Home-field advantage accelerates leaf litter decomposition in forests. Soil Biology and Biochemistry.
- Ayres, E., Steltzer, H. et al. (2009). Soil biota accelerate decomposition in high‐elevation forests by specializing in the breakdown of litter produced by the plant species above them. Journal of Ecology.
- Lau, J. A., Puliafico, K. P., Kopshever, J. A., Steltzer, H. et al. (2008). Inference of allelopathy is complicated by effects of activated carbon on plant growth. New Phytologist.
- Reyes-Fox, M., Steltzer, H. et al. (2014). Elevated CO 2 further lengthens growing season under warming conditions. Nature.
