= Heidi Weisel =

American fashion designer (c.1961–2021)

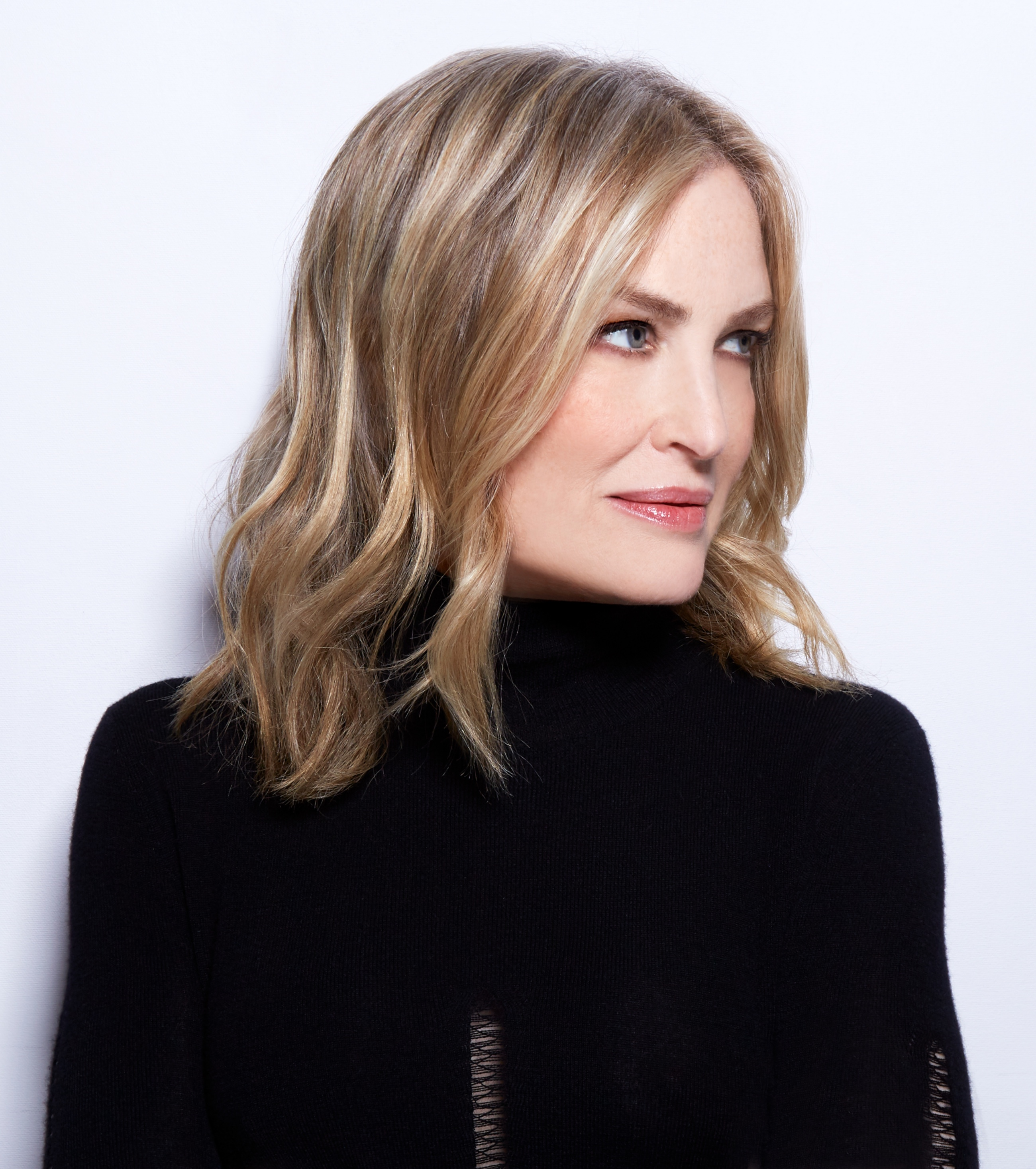
- Born: 1961 or 1962; San Francisco, California, U.S.
- Died: January 28, 2021 (aged 59); Los Angeles, California, U.S.
- Occupation: Fashion designer
- Years active: 1990–2021

Heidi Weisel (1961/1962 – January 28, 2021) was an American fashion designer. She was the founder and head of design for Heidi Weisel, a New York City-based women's luxury brand. Weisel's signature was creating modern, timeless evening wear with the simplicity and ease of sportswear. She was known for her unexpected mix of fabrics, often incorporating knitted cashmere, silk chiffon, silk satin, lace, tulle, and leather. A Heidi Weisel chiffon and lace design is in the permanent collection of the Metropolitan Museum of Art. Weisel was a member of the Council of Fashion Designers of America (CFDA).

== Early life and education ==
Weisel was born in San Francisco, California, and raised in Brooklyn, New York with her brother Jack. The daughter of Jewish immigrants from Hungary, Weisel credited her mother Rachel's simple, elegant style and her father David, who had a textile business, with instilling a love and appreciation of beautiful fabrics. At five years old she began using fabric swatches her father had given her to design a wardrobe for her Skipper doll. When she was ten years old her parents bought her a sewing machine. She attended the Fashion Institute of Technology where she received an Associate of Applied Science Degree in Fashion Design.

== Career ==
Weisel debuted her collection in 1990 with six black evening pieces. Her initial concept was inspired by the movement and diaphanous costumes of dancers as well as by her own personal search for youthful, elegant designs that were modern and unstructured. The dress that launched her career featured a knitted cashmere bodice and silk chiffon skirt, simply held together by a satin ribbon. Weisel's effortlessly chic gowns and dresses were a sharp contrast to the more complex and heavily structured evening dresses of the time.

The collection was soon carried at national retailers Neiman Marcus, Barneys New York, Bergdorf Goodman, Saks Fifth Avenue, Bloomingdale's, and Marshall Field's; United Kingdom-based Harrods and Harvey Nichols; as well as the United States specialty stores Stanley Korshak, Mitchells, Richards, and Linda Dresner. Weisel launched her bridal collection in 1996, which became a Bergdorf Goodman exclusive a few seasons later. In 1999, Weisel launched a line of wraps in cashmere, silk, and velvet. As part of the debut collection, Weisel created a wrap for the Susan G. Komen Breast Cancer Foundation, for which a portion of proceeds benefited the organization.

=== Media ===
Weisel has appeared on CBS This Morning, Extra (American TV program), CNN, E! and Fashion File. She has also been profiled in Women's Wear Daily, People (magazine), InStyle, House Beautiful, and Travel + Leisure. Her designs have been featured in major print media, including Vogue (magazine), Harper's Bazaar, People (magazine), The New York Times, New York Daily News, New York Post, Chicago Tribune, Town & Country (magazine), O, The Oprah Magazine, Martha Stewart Living, New York (magazine), The Washington Post, Chicago Tribune, and Los Angeles (magazine).

Weisel also appeared with award-winning pastry chef Dominique Ansel on Martha The Martha Stewart Show, where the two collaborated on a winter white chocolate and crystal decorated wedding dress.

Weisel has also been featured in books, including Elements of Style by Phillip Bloch, New York Fashion Week by Eila Mell, Impact: 50 Years of the CFDA by Patricia Mears, and Bobbi Brown - Beauty Evolution by Bobbi Brown.

=== Movie credits ===
Weisel's work has been featured in major motion pictures, including:

- Austin Powers: International Man of Mystery: Elizabeth Hurley
- Intolerable Cruelty: Catherine Zeta-Jones
- The Beautician and the Beast: Fran Drescher

=== Celebrity dressing ===
Celebrities Brooke Shields, Faith Hill, Sandra Bullock, Vanessa Williams, Oprah Winfrey, Catherine Zeta-Jones, Elizabeth Hurley, Salma Hayek, Debra Messing, Sharon Stone, Joan Allen, Lisa Kudrow, and Sofía Vergara have all worn Heidi Weisel; as have fashion industry icons Kate Spade and Bobbi Brown. Drew Barrymore wore a Heidi Weisel dress for her first InStyle magazine cover in March 1999.

Vanessa Williams wore Heidi Weisel for two appearances on Saturday Night Live, including one where she performed with Luciano Pavarotti, as well as for “Vanessa Williams & Friends – Christmas in New York,” airing December 1, 1996.

Actress and model Brooke Shields chose to wear a Heidi Weisel gown for her wedding to tennis player Andre Agassi; and also chose Weisel designs for her bridesmaids. American singer and producer Faith Hill also wore a Weisel wedding dress, which was later included in an exhibition about the singer and her husband, country singer and actor Tim McGraw, at the Country Music Hall of Fame and Museum.

Weisel's designs have also been worn on the red carpet for the Academy Awards, People's Choice Awards, Golden Globe Awards, and the Emmy Award.

=== Awards and honors ===
- Metropolitan Museum of Art, Costume Institute, Heidi Weisel design chosen for Infra-Apparel exhibition, 1993; added to permanent collection in 1994.
- Cotton, Inc. Fashion Show, 1994
- Vidal Sassoon Excellence in New Design, 1994
- Council of Fashion Designers of America member, 1995
- Award for Excellence in American Design, Washington, D.C., 1995
- Gold Coast Fashion Award for Excellence in Design, 2000

=== Collaborations ===
Weisel has collaborated with several retailers and global brands, including HSN, Standard Textile, and Dressbarn.

== Death ==
Weisel died on January 28, 2021, aged 59, in Los Angeles.
