= Heidi Hadsell =

American academic

Heidi Hadsell do Nascimento was the president of Hartford Seminary until April 2018.

She received a bachelor's degree from University of California, Berkeley, a master's degree from Union Theological Seminary at Columbia University, and a Ph.D. from the University of Southern California. She also did post-doctoral work at the Ecole des Hautes Etudes en Sciences Sociales in Paris.

She was director of the Ecumenical Institute of the World Council of Churches, Bossey, Switzerland from 1997-2001.

She has also taught at the Federal University of Santa Catarina, Florianópolis, Brazil; the University of Southern California; and the Ecumenical Institute in Switzerland. She joined the faculty of McCormick Theological Seminary in Chicago, as Assistant Professor of Social Ethics in 1989. At McCormick, she became Dean in 1993 and Professor of Social Ethics in 1994.

She served at Hartford Seminary from 2000 to 2018, as president and professor of social ethics.

She was a member of the Board of Foundation of Globethics.net from 2009 to 2016 and since then she is Senior Advisor of Globethics.net for global ethics. One of her main topics in the research and teaching is political ethics and global ethics. She is co-editor of the book "Overcoming Fundamentalism, Ethical Responses from Five Continents"
