= Heidi Zimmer =

American deaf mountaineer (born c. 2013)

- Born: Heidi Zimmer; Southern California, United States

Heidi Zimmer is an American deaf mountaineer who has accomplished several notable firsts in mountaineering. She was born deaf, and became the first deaf woman in history to reach the top of Mount McKinley on June 13, 1991. At the top, she unfolded a banner reading "DEAF WOMAN, A PARADE THROUGH THE DECADES". On August 15, 1992, Zimmer became the first deaf person to summit Mount Elbrus. On September 22, 1994, Zimmer became the first deaf woman to summit Kilimanjaro. She has also won a bronze medal in the Deaf Olympics. She graduated from Gallaudet University in 1978.

In 1996, Zimmer was diagnosed with Usher's syndrome.

She hopes to climb all the Seven Summits, the highest mountains of each of the seven continents.
