= Huis ter Heide =

Huis ter Heide may refer to the following places in the Netherlands:

- Huis ter Heide, Utrecht
- Huis ter Heide, Drenthe
