= Heidi Abel =

Swiss television presenter

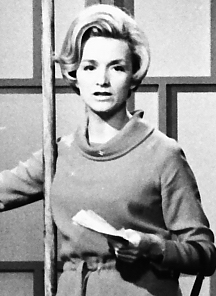
- Born: 21 February 1929; Switzerland
- Died: 23 December 1986 (aged 57)
- Education: Basel School for Applied Art
- Occupations: television presenter, model, radio host

Heidi Abel (21 February 1929 – 23 December 1986) was a popular Swiss television presenter.

After attending the Basel School for Applied Art, she worked as a model and as a radio host with the Basel station Radibus. In 1954, she joined Swiss television, initially as a news presenter, and then as the host of a great number of educational and entertainment shows. She also hosted talk shows and musical programs for Swiss radio.

As the most popular TV personality in German-speaking Switzerland in the 1950s and 60s, she embodied the new medium of television for the Swiss public. She received multiple awards for her work, and a street near the Zürich headquarters of Swiss television is named for her.
