= Heidi Saadiya =

First transgender journalist from Kerala, India

- Born: Chavakkad, Guruvayoor, India
- Education: Institute of Journalism
- Occupation: Journalist
- Notable credit: Kairali TV

Heidi Saadiya is a journalist, transgender rights activist and a YouTuber. She is known for being Kerala's first transgender national television newsreader on Kairali TV. Saadiya is the first trans woman journalism student in the state.

== Early life ==
Saadiya was born into an orthodox Muslim family at Chavakkad in Thrissur district of Kerala and she grew up in Ponnani, Malappuram. At the age of ten, she realised that her sexual identity. She told The News Minute that "I had a condition called gynecomastia". She was disowned by her family who rejected her gender identity, at the age of 18. She left her home, and has not been in contact with her family since then.

== Career ==
Saadiya started her career as a trainee journalist on Kairali TV in August 2019. On 2 September 2019 her first live broadcast was about the Chandrayaan-2 moon lander.

== Personal life ==
In 2019, Saadiya began a romantic relationship with Atharv and he proposed marriage. On 26 January 2020, Saadiya married Atharv at TDM Hall in Ernakulam on the 71st Republic Day under the Special Marriage Act. The wedding was jointly organised by Sri Sathya Sai Orphanage Trust and Ernakulam NSS Karayogam.

In July 2022, Saadiya declared that the couple had divorced through her official YouTube channel.
