= Heidi (song) =

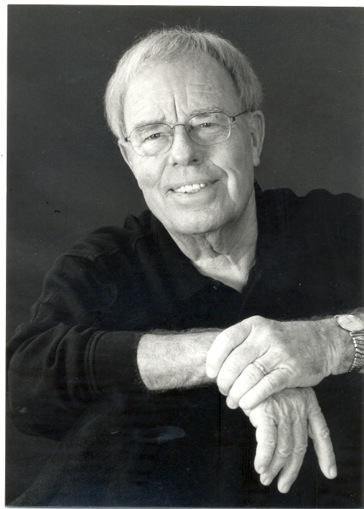
- Christian Bruhn, the German version composer

Single by Gitti und Erika

from the album Heidi, Original German Soundtrack animation series
- B-side: "Sonne Im Herzen"
- Released: 15 September 1977
- Genre: Schlager
- Length: 2:50
- Label: Telefunken
- Composer: Christian Bruhn
- Lyricists: Andrea Wagner; Wolfgang Weinzierl
- Producer: Christian Bruhn

Music video
- "Heidi" on YouTube

"Heidi" is an anime theme song by German schlager duo Gitti und Erika, released in 1977 on Telefunken. It is one of the most widely recognized and famous German-language songs of all time.

== History ==
Song was written specially for the German dub version of Heidi, Girl of the Alps, three years after original Japanese anime (1974). An entirely new soundtrack was composed; all the music except from theme song was written by German composer Gert Wilden. The theme song music, simply called "Heidi" was written by German composer Christian Bruhn, with the lyrics contributed by Andrea Wagner and Wolfgang Weinzierl.

The song was performed by sisters Brigitte Goetz and Erika Bruhn (née Goetz), called Gitti und Erika who started their career in 1970s. Erika was married to the composer Christian Bruhn.

The German-language version of the series was originally broadcast on ZDF, German national TV channel, from 18 September 1977 to 14 September 1978.

== Charts ==
=== Weekly charts ===
Chart (1977–78)	Peak position
Austria (Ö3 Austria Top 40)	18
Germany (Official German Charts)	4
Netherlands (Dutch Top 40)	14
Netherlands (Single Top 100)	8
