= Heidi.com =

Swiss clothing company

heidi.com
- Type: Société Anonyme
- Founded: Saint-Blaise, Switzerland (2002)
- Founder: Andreas Doering, Willy Fantin
- Defunct: 2021
- Headquarters: Neuchâtel, Switzerland
- Products: Apparel

heidi.com was a Neuchâtel, Switzerland-based company specialized in ready-to-wear apparel. Its name and logo are directly inspired from Heidi, the main character in Johanna Spyri's 1880 novel. The brand officially equipped all members of the Swiss pavilion at the Expo 2015 in Milan.

Following the company's subsequent liquidation in 2021, the www.heidi.com domain name was bought by the UK-based ski holiday operator, Heidi.

== History ==
The company was founded in 2002 by Andreas Doering and Willy Fantin in Saint-Blaise, Switzerland, and quickly built its image around various guerilla marketing stunts around the world. Its quick growth led it to become a full Société Anonyme company on 27 June 2012. Moving its headquarters to Neuchâtel in January 2014, its capital base increased fourfold over the same year, with several investors joining the founders. Willy Fantin then left the company's board to work directly at the management level. It went bankrupt at the end of 2020 and into liquidation in the spring of 2021. In 2023 it ceased to exist in the registry.

== Brand ambassadors ==
The brand was selected by Presence Switzerland to equip the staff at the Shanghai and Milan World's Fairs.

Heidi remained a web retailer for its first ten years of existence, finally opened its flagship store in December 2013 located in the former Neuchâtel Fire Station. It was designed by iraqi-british architect Zaha Hadid. This project, called Retail of Tomorrow, was developed in partnership with Samsung and included a variety of interactive signage, most notably through near field communication.

In the Fall of 2014, heidi announced a partnership with Swiss pop-star Bastian Baker whereby the artist, beyond sporting branded goods, also participated in the design of limited edition clothing.

=== Notable guerilla marketing events ===
2012

Two weeks in an igloo on the Thyon slopes for the winner of a contest;

2010

Election posters during the 2010 Australian federal election;

2008

A "raffle cab" at the Nendaz ski resort.
