= Marco Heide =

German politician (born 1988)

Member of the Landtag of Saxony-Anhalt
- Incumbent
- Assumed office 18 February 2026
- Preceded by: Nicole Anger

Personal details
- Born: 12 December 1988 (age 37) Berlin-Friedrichshain
- Party: Die Linke

Marco Heide (born 12 December 1988 in Berlin-Friedrichshain) is a German politician serving as a member of the Landtag of Saxony-Anhalt since 2026. From 2019 to 2023, he was a city councillor of Salzwedel.
