= Hedy Klineman =

American painter

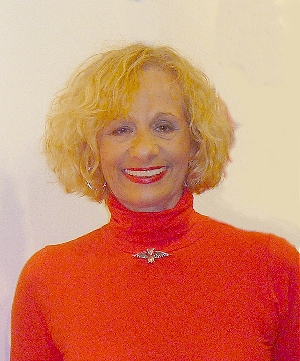
- Hedy Klineman 2012
- Born: Hamburg, Germany
- Education: Cooper Union, New York
- Known for: Painting
- Movement: Neo-expressionism, POP

Hedy Klineman is a German-born American painter living in New York City. She has been painting for over 40 years and is known for portraits of New York celebrities and colorful works based on Asian Buddha's and deities created with silkscreen on canvas done in a manner influenced by her friend Andy Warhol. Her paintings have been shown at Tibet House US, Patterson Museum of Contemporary Art and The New England Museum of Contemporary Art.

== Early life ==
Hedy Klineman grew up in Williamsburg Brooklyn. After attending F.I.T and Pratt Institute, she graduated from Cooper Union in 1962 where she came under the influence of the Abstract Expressionists such as Willem de Kooning and Franz Kline. After working for Charles Jourdan shoes and creating their American division, she focused on painting in the 1970s.

== Art ==
During the 1970s, Hedy Klineman painted brushy abstractions and splashy Color Field drip paintings influenced by Hans Hofmann, Helen Frankenthaler and Larry Poons.

== 1980s ==
Klineman developed, in the early 1980s, a very personal style of portraiture called "Fashion Portraits." She became known as a chronicler of the downtown art scene and of uptown socialite personalities, using an unusual collage-assemblage technique. Sitters were asked to contribute pieces of clothing that represented them. Then Klineman would adhere the clothing to the canvas along with painted elements and objects to create a mixed media portrait. Andy Warhol donated a pair of glasses, Henry Geldzahler gave her a hat and Julian Schnabel gave her the clothes he painted in. Keith Haring, Mary McFadden, Bret Easton Ellis, Larry Rivers, Betsey Johnson and Jane Holzer all donated items that were used in their portraits. These were shown at Harm Bouckaert Gallery in 1984 and Sensory Evolution Gallery in 1986. During this period, she also painted day glow nudes and figures. Latter in the 1980s as the Cold War ended, she turned to political content using silkscreened newspaper images of current events. These were shown at Rempire Gallery in Soho in 1991 along with some of the first Buddhas.

== 1990s ==
In the 1990s Klineman embarked on a spiritual journey studying meditation and yoga. She then began using deities from India, China and Indonesia. Using multiple silk-screens, Klineman overlapped Hindu and Buddhist imagery over textured backgrounds that sometimes included gold leaf. A major show of this work was held at Bridgewater Lustberg Gallery in 1996.

== 2000s ==
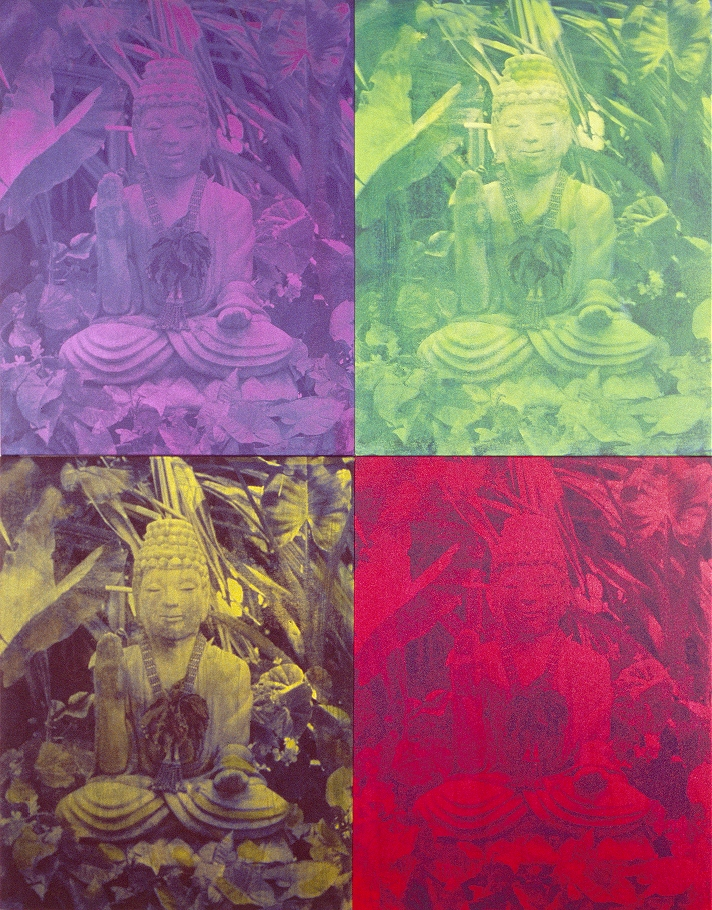
Pool Buddha 72" x 56" Acrylic Silkscreen on Canvas 2011

Through the 2000s Klineman focused on the Buddha as subject matter and produced series of large multi paneled silkscreen paintings where the Buddha is repeated in bright Pop colors called "Buddha's in the Garden." Concurrently she continued to make hand painted Buddha's, still lives, landscapes and abstracts.

== Currently ==
Recently Klineman has continued portrait painting with a series called "African American Portraits" depicting prominent African Americans using African masks in silkscreen collage. Some of her subjects are Russell Simmons, Mary Schmidt Campbell and Jessye Norman. Paintings from this series were exhibited at Benrimon Contemporary in 2012.

In 2013, Tibet House US presented "Buddhas in the Garden," an exhibit of Klineman's work from the previous 10 years.

== Museum collections ==
- The Hood Museum, Dartmouth College, Hanover, NH
- Patterson Museum of Contemporary Art, Patterson, NJ
- New England Museum of Contemporary Art, Brooklyn, CT
- The Foundation for God Realization, Ashland, OR
- Sun Bank, Fort Lauderdale, FL
- EIS, Stamford, CT
- The Rubin Museum, NY
