= Heidi Miller =

American bodybuilder

Heidi Miller (born c. 1958 in Santa Monica, California) is an American female bodybuilder who held the title Ms. Natural America in 1981. She is also a former National Gymnastics Champion.

Her other bodybuilding awards include Ms. Natural Universe - NBA, 2nd place 1982; Western America Championships - NPC, LightWeight, 5th place 1983; and Western America Championships - NPC, LightWeight, 1st place 1984. She retired from competitive bodybuilding in 1984.

Miller is currently on the board of the American Heart Association, the Children's Bureau Foundation, and Pat McCormick's Educational Foundation. She is a public speaker and entrepreneur. Her book and video are titled Bodysculpting. She currently resides in California.

== Books and Videos ==
- Heidi Miller's Body Sculpting: Sculpt Tone and Firm Your Body to Its Most Perfect Proportions, Miller, Heidi, Hdl Publishing 1988, ISBN 0-937359-32-7
