= W. Hanselman =

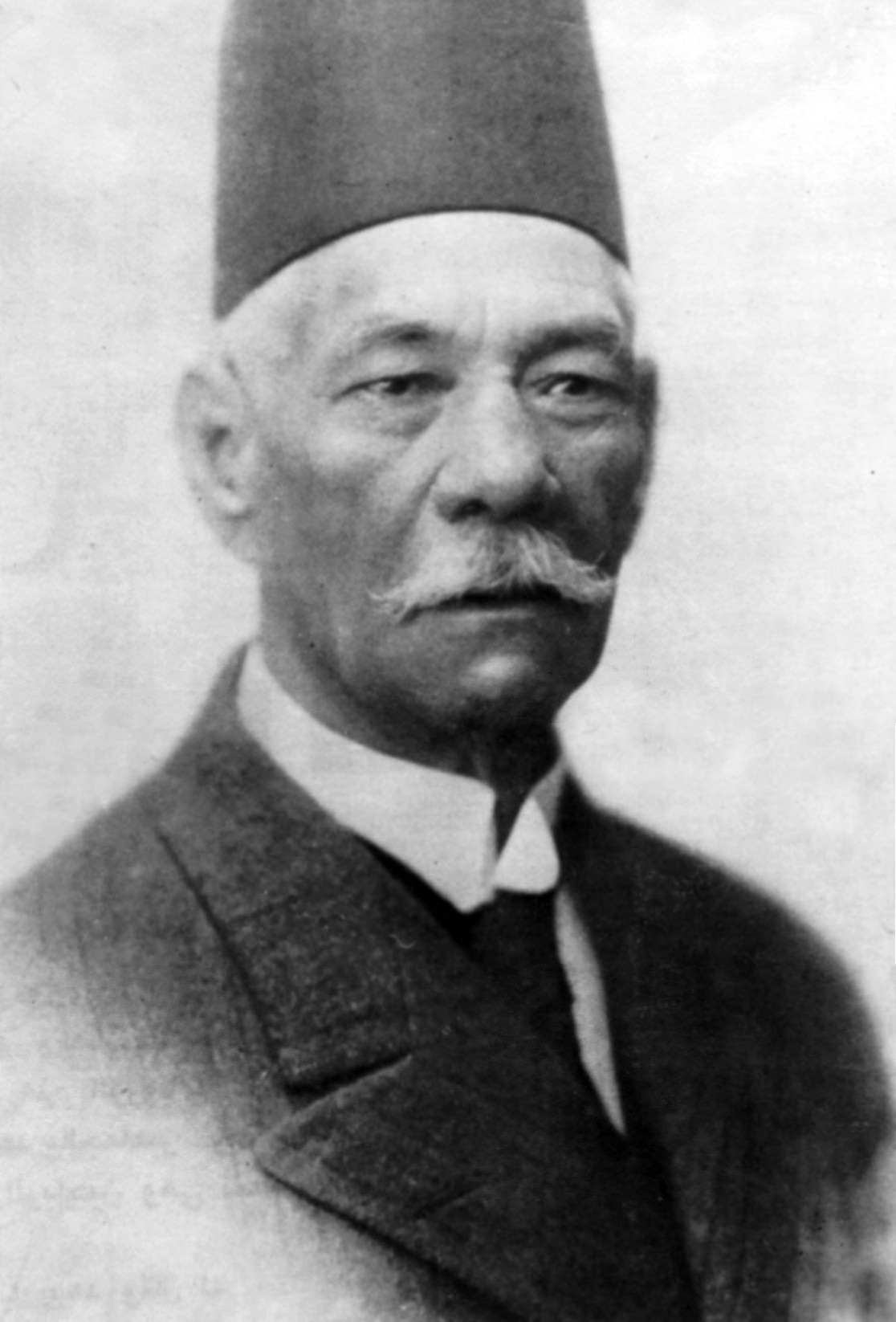
Famous portrait of Saad Zaghloul by Hanselman

W. Hanselman was a photographer of Jewish origin established in Egypt. Working for Cairo's Anglo-Swiss Studio, he was renowned for his images of King Fuad I, Queen Farida and other Egyptian royalty. According to American photographer Barry Iverson (born in 1956), Hanselman was the great genius of court photography at the time and very much the favorite, particularly in the late 1920s. One of his most recognizable works is a black-and-white photographic portrait of Egyptian nationalist leader and prime minister Saad Zaghloul.
