= Thomas Hanselmann =

Liechtenstein footballer

Personal information
- Date of birth: 21 April 1976 (age 50)
- Place of birth: Liechtenstein
- Position: Defender

Senior career*
Years	Team	Apps	(Gls)
1993–1995	FC Balzers		
1995–1996	FC Vaduz		
1996–2000	FC Balzers		
2000–2003	FC Chur 97		

International career
1996–2001	Liechtenstein	25	(0)
- * Club domestic league appearances and goals

Thomas Hanselmann (born 21 April 1976) is a former Liechtenstein football defender.

Making his debut against Macedonia in 1996, Hanselmann would go on to win 25 caps and score one goal for his country. He last played at the club level for FC Chur 97.
