= Von der Heide =

Von der Heide is a surname. Notable people with the name include:

- Michael von der Heide (born 1971), Swiss musician, singer and actor
- Tobias von der Heide (born 1984), German politician
- Nancy Vonderheide (born c. 1939), American archer
