= Powerhouse Science Center =

The Powerhouse
- Established: 2011
- Location: 1333 Camino del Rio; Durango, Colorado
- Coordinates: 37.2788°N 107.87997°W
- Type: Science museum
- Website: powsci.org

The Powerhouse, formerly The Durango Discovery Museum, is an interactive science focused children's museum located in Durango, Colorado. The museum opened on February 23, 2011, in what was once a power plant.

The museum is located in the Durango Light and Power Company building, built in 1892. The plant was a very early alternating current power plant, the power we use today, meaning the town of Durango had AC powered street lights before many large cities in the East. In honor of its past, the museum focuses on energy-related themes throughout its exhibit spaces and in its outreach programs. The renovated Mission-style powerhouse is a state and national historic place. Today, the original boiler room remains intact and serves as the science center's theater.

Located on the bank of the Animas River, along the Animas River Trail, the museum is part of the City of Durango's initiative to revitalize the riverfront to improve Colorado tourism. The Museum is located at 1333 Camino Del Rio, Durango, Colorado.

== Events and Activities ==
The Four Corners FIRST LEGO League, a regional Lego Robotics competition, was coordinated by the museum in 2014.

== Reboot ==
The Durango Discovery Museum closed in May 2015 due to financial troubles. Community organizations then began reorganizing and reopened the museum as the Powerhouse Science Center.
