= Heide (disambiguation) =

Heide is a town in Schleswig-Holstein, Germany.

Heide may also refer to:

== Places ==
- Heide, Venray, Netherlands
- Heide, Kalmthout, Belgium
- Heide Park, a theme park in Lower Saxony, Germany
- Heide–Büsum Airport, Heide, Germany
- Romincka Forest, Rominter Heide (Ostpreußen), Russia

== Other uses ==
- Heide (name), a given name and surname, including a list of people with the name
- Heide Candy Company, an American company
- Heide Circle, grouping of Australian artists
- Heide Museum of Modern Art in Bulleen, Victoria, Australia

== See also ==
- Heiden
- Heidi (disambiguation)
- Huis ter Heide (disambiguation)
