= Hedy Frank-Autheried =

Austrian composer (1902–1979)

Hedy Frank-Autheried (22 January 1902 – 24 March 1979) was an Austrian composer. She studied music at the Vienna Academy, but was unable to further her education at that time. She married Ferdinand Frank and later studied composition with Camillo Horn. After completing her studies, she worked as a composer. She died in Vienna.
