= Heidi, Girl of the Alps =

1974 Japanese animated TV series

- アルプスの少女ハイジ
- Genre: Drama, historical
- Based on: Heidi by Johanna Spyri
- Developed by: Isao Matsuki
- Directed by: Isao Takahata
- Music by: Takeo Watanabe
- Country of origin: Japan
- Original language: Japanese
- No. of episodes: 52 (list of episodes)

Production
- Producer: Shigehito Takahashi
- Production companies: Fuji Television; Zuiyo Eizo

Original release
- Network: FNS (Fuji TV)
- Release: January 6 – December 29, 1974

Related
- Anime film

Arupusu no Shōjo Haiji
- Directed by: Sumiko Nakao; Isao Takahata
- Produced by: Shigehito Takahashi
- Music by: Takeo Watanabe
- Studio: Zuiyo
- Released: March 17, 1979
- Runtime: 107 minutes
- Original video animation

Arupusu no Shōjo Haiji: Arumu no Yama-hen
- Music by: Takeo Watanabe
- Studio: Zuiyo
- Released: April 21, 1993
- Runtime: 89 minutes
- Original video animation

Arupusu no Shōjo Haiji: Haiji to Kurara-hen
- Music by: Takeo Watanabe
- Studio: Zuiyo
- Released: April 21, 1993
- Runtime: 91 minutes

Heidi, Girl of the Alps (Japanese: アルプスの少女ハイジ, Hepburn: Arupusu no Shōjo Haiji) is a Japanese animated television series produced by Zuiyo Eizo and is based on the novel Heidi by Johanna Spyri. It was directed by Isao Takahata and features contributions by numerous other anime filmmakers, including Yōichi Kotabe (character design, animation director), Toyoo Ashida (co-character design, animation director), Yoshiyuki Tomino (storyboard, screenplay), and Hayao Miyazaki (scene design, layout, screenplay).

Heidi is the 6th and final entry in Calpis Comic Theater, a precursor of the World Masterpiece Theater series, based on classic tales from the Western world. The animation studio responsible for Heidi, Zuiyo Enterprise, would split in 1975 into Nippon Animation (which employed the anime's production staff and continued with the World Masterpiece Theater franchise) with Zuiyo retaining the rights (and debt) to the Heidi TV series. The feature-length film edit of the TV series, released in March 1979, was engineered completely by Zuiyo, with no additional involvement from Nippon Animation, Takahata or Miyazaki. Zuiyo also re-edited the series in two OVA released in 1993.

== Plot ==
Heidi is five years old when her aunt Dete, who has raised Heidi since her parents' deaths four years earlier, takes the orphaned Heidi to live with her formidable grandfather in the Swiss Alps. Dete has found a promising job in Frankfurt, but cannot leave while still Heidi's legal guardian, nor can she take Heidi with her. The only closest relative left is Heidi's grandfather, and in Dete's opinion, he should take some responsibility and do his share since she is the daughter of his deceased son. Alm-Onji (the Old Man of the Alps), as Heidi's grandfather is commonly known, has a fearsome reputation with the villagers of Dörfli, as rumors claim that in his youth he killed a man. He lives a solitary life with his dog Josef in a cabin halfway up the mountain. Heidi quickly wins her way into his heart with her enthusiasm and intelligence, firmly establishing herself in his life. She spends her days on the mountain top with the rebellious goatherd Peter, whose responsibility is to take the villagers' goats to the high mountains for pasture, and her winters occasionally visiting Peter's grandmother, a blind old woman whose dream is to one day hear her cherished book of psalms read to her (which Peter cannot do since he failed to learn to read). Alm-Onji's misanthropy and seclusion prevents Heidi from going to school, of which she has no experience anyway, ultimately leaving her illiterate like Peter.

Heidi continues to live happily in the mountains until Aunt Dete returns from the city, excited about a good opportunity for Heidi. A wealthy German businessman, Mr. Sesemann, is searching for a companion for his wheelchair-using daughter Clara, who is disabled due to rickets. Thwarted by Alm-Onji, Dete tricks Heidi into accompanying her, ostensibly to get a present for Peter and her grandfather. Although at first promised that she can return at any time, Heidi quickly learns of the ruse and tries to convince Dete to let her stay but is instead dragged to Frankfurt by force. While on a train headed to Frankfurt, Heidi screamed and cried for her grandfather, when she tries to leave the train, she realizes too late as the train is moving away. When they finally arrive at the Sesemann mansion, Dete abandons her under the authority of Miss Rottenmeier, the strict, no-nonsense governess in charge of Clara's welfare. Heidi and Clara immediately become friends, and Heidi quickly turns the household topsy-turvy with her escapades and well-meaning faux pas. Clara is enchanted by Heidi's stories of the Alps, which paints a picture of a life completely different from the sheltered and lonely one she is normally accustomed to. Her widowed father is mostly away on business, and Clara's only constant companions until now are the servants and her pet canary.

Heidi's longing to return home and occasional attempts to escape are punctuated by the occasional distractions of new friends. She smuggles a small kitten into the house, and she and Clara care for it until Miss Rottenmeier discovers it and has it thrown out, until Sebastian, the kindly butler, is able to leave the kitten with a friend. Clara's doctor befriends her, and occasionally keeps a benevolent eye on her, but it is Clara's grandmother that has the most impact. On one of her rare visits to Frankfurt, she and Heidi become fast friends. Under her kindly tutelage, Heidi finally learns how to read and write, to the astonishment of the tutor who has struggled for months to do the same, but the old woman's departure proves a turning point for Heidi. Forbidden by Miss Rottenmeier to ever mention or even think of the Alps again, Heidi rapidly goes into a decline, eventually becoming a sleep-walker, whose passage through the hallways is mistaken for that of a ghost, terrorizing the household.

Summoned home to deal with the haunting, Mr. Sesemann, with the aid of the doctor, catch Heidi in the middle of the night. The doctor diagnoses Heidi's condition as a serious case of homesickness and persuades Mr. Sesemann to send the girl back to the Alps before she dies of her condition. Clara is only reconciled by the promise that she will be allowed to visit Heidi in the mountains. Under the care of Sebastian, Heidi embarks on the long trip home, finally returning to her grandfather, Peter and his family.

Heidi's return and her newfound enjoyment of reading prompt Alm-Onji to partially restore a ruined house down in the village, where they retire the following winter so that Heidi and Peter can start going to school. Over the course of the season, Heidi and Alm-Onji become friendly with the villagers, and Peter builds his own sled and wins a local race. The subsequent spring, they return to the mountain in the Alps, bidding farewell to their new friends. In Frankfurt, Clara, who has been longing to see her friend again, reminds her father of his promise to her, but he reminds her that the conditions in the Swiss Alps may be too harsh for her to handle. The doctor is sent to the Alps in her place, to inspect the area and determine whether it is an appropriate environment for a disabled, sick young child. Heidi, Peter, Alm-Onji, and the limitations of the terrain convince the doctor that this may be just the place for Clara to try out her legs again.

In due course, Clara comes to the Alps with Miss Rottenmeier, who shows a clear disapproval of the rustic conditions, an open fear of animals, and distress at the potential for accidents on the mountain. Clara's grandmother soon arrives, and after seeing first-hand the vast improvement in Clara's condition, sends Miss Rottenmeier home, commending Clara to the Alm-Onji's care before departing herself. After having established that Clara's legs are capable of functioning, the children and Alm-Onji begin to work on Clara's physical therapy. Eventually, Clara is able to walk without assistance and returns home with her father and grandmother, promising that she will return the following spring to be with her friends again.

== Cast ==
| Character | Japanese | English |
|---|---|---|
| Heidi (ハイジ, Haiji) | Kazuko Sugiyama (杉山佳寿子) | Randi Kiger |
| Alm-Ohi (アルムおんじ, Arumu onji) | Kohei Miyauchi | Vic Perrin |
| The Doctor | Yoshiaki Nemoto | Vic Perrin |
| Peter (ペーター, Pētā) | Noriko Ohara; Hiroko Maruyama (film version) | Billy Whitaker |
| Großmutter (おばあさん, Obasan) | Miyako Shima; Terue Nunami | Irene Tedrow |
| Aunt Dete | Taeko Nakanishi | Janet Waldo |
| Clara Sesemann (クララ・ゼーゼマン, Kurara Zēzeman) | Rihoko Yoshida; Keiko Han (film version) | Michele Laurita |
| Miss Rottenmeier (ロッテンマイヤー, Rottenmaiyā) | Miyoko Asō; Hisako Kyouda (film version) | Jacquelyn Hyde |
| Sebastian (セバスチャン, Sebaschan) | Kaneta Kimotsuki | Alan Reed |
| Mr. Sesemann (ゼーゼマン, Zēzeman) | Taimei Suzuki | Barney Phillips |
| Grandmamma | Natsuko Kawaji; Miyoko Asō (film version) | Lurene Tuttle |
| Brigette | Akiko Tsuboi; Takako Kondo | Julie McWhirter |
| Johann (ヨハン, Johann) | Yoshiaki Nemoto; Mitsuo Senda (film version) | Unknown |

=== Additional English voices ===
- Vic Perrin (Postman)
- Alan Reed (Mr. Usher)
- Barney Phillips (Mr. Kaehlin)
- Julie McWhirter (Neighbor Lady)

== Characters ==
=== Main characters ===
Heidi (ハイジ, Haiji)
Heidi, christened Adelheid, is 5 years old and an orphan at the time the story begins. The story eventually ends some three years later. Heidi's curiosity, enthusiasm, and intelligence charm most people and animals into friendship, with one notable exception being Ms. Rottenmeier, the governess of the Sesemann family. Heidi's only relatives are her Aunt Dete, from her mother's side, and her paternal grandfather, the Alm-Onji, from her father's side.

Alm-Onji (アルムおんじ, Arumu onji)
The Alm-Onji, or Onji (Alm-Öhi in German), is never identified by any proper name; he is Heidi's estranged grandfather, whose deceased son was Heidi's father. He is an old man, but still physically formidable, with a deep well of wisdom and mountain knowledge that he uses to survive the harsh conditions of the Swiss Alps. He is rumored to have killed a man in his youth, and is considered unapproachably stern and grouchy, but he gradually comes out of his shell once Heidi is in his care. He is a skilled woodworker, creating bowls and assorted utensils out of wood, and provides cheese for trade with the villagers.

Peter (ペーター, Pētā)
Peter is a 9-year-old goatherd who is responsible for caring for the village goats during the summer; he and Heidi quickly befriend each other during their introduction. He later becomes Heidi's love interest. He lives with his mother and his blind grandmother in a shack some distance from the village. His father was a goatherd as well, until he died. Peter's family is not wealthy, since neither him nor his mother can read, and he was used to going hungry until he befriended Heidi. He is an indifferent student, and is somewhat notorious for his appetite and academic incompetence, but towards the end of the series he discovers a natural talent at carpentry.

Clara Sesemann (クララ・ゼーゼマン, Kurara Zēzeman)
Clara is the 12-year-old daughter of a wealthy wine merchant who due to professional and personal reasons spends most of his time away from his home in Frankfurt since his wife's death. Because her legs are paralyzed (the exact cause is left unknown, but it is hinted to be due to a long-term illness), Clara has spent a lonely life in her home; therefore the Sesemann family governess, Miss Rottenmeier, has publicized a request for a playmate, which Heidi's aunt Dete answered. Despite their age difference, and because they have only each other to turn to, Heidi and Clara become very close, which occasionally makes Peter jealous of Clara, although he still also cares greatly for Clara and goes to great lengths to help her. While in the original story it is Peter who destroys Clara's wheelchair, in the anime series it is Clara who accidentally wrecks it when she begins to have doubts about wanting to walk.

=== Others ===
Joseph
Heidi's grandfather's dog, a St. Bernard. Mostly lazying around the alm hut, he is nevertheless stout and reliable in an emergency, and has a habit of gobbling up any snail he encounters. This character was created exclusively for the series, and does not appear in Johanna Spyri's original story.
Yuki
Yuki ("Snow"; English name "Snowflake") is a kid among the flock Peter cares for. She had taken an instant liking to Heidi upon first meeting her. She is based on a kid goat named "Schneehöppli" from the book.
Brigette
Peter's mother.
Peter's Grandmother
Peter's grandmother who lives with him and her daughter, Brigette. Blind for several years, her greatest dream is to have someone read her favorite songs from an old book in her possession, but neither Brigette nor Peter can read.
Aunt Dete (デーテおばさん, Dete-obasan)
Aunt Dete is the sister of Heidi's mother, Adelheid. In the novel and the series, she is portrayed as a rather self-centered person, considering her own interests first and neglecting the opinions of others. She especially clashes with the Alm-Onji, first expecting him to take Heidi against his will, then taking her away from him.
Fräulein Rottenmeier (ロッテンマイヤーさん, Rottenmeier-san)
Miss Rottenmeier is the governess and housekeeper of the Sesemann family. She cares a lot about Clara, but cannot stand Heidi. She is strict and believes Heidi is "wild" and needs to be disciplined.
Sebastian
The butler of the Sesemann family, he is getting along well with Heidi and brings her back to Dörfli.
Tinette
The maid of the Sesemann family.
Johan
The carriage driver for the Sesemann family.
Mr. Sesemann (ゼーゼマンさん, Sesemann-san)
Mr. Sesemann is Clara's father and the head of the Sesemann household. Absent from his house most of the time, he leaves the daily proceedings to Fräulein Rottenmeier, though he occasionally returns home when pressing concerns are brought to his attention. He cares a lot about Heidi.
The Doctor (お医者さん, Oisha-san)
Clara's attending physician and an old friend of the Sesemann household, who also befriends Heidi when she first encounters him on an errand for Herr Sesemann. In the German version of the series, he is usually called "Herr Geheimrat" (in place of his actual "Medizinalrat" title).
Frau Sesemann
Clara's grandmother and Mr. Sesemann's mother, who lives in Holstein and visits her son's household only infrequently. She is a lively and informal person despite her age, full of humor and fun, who strongly contrasts (and silently clashes) with Fräulein Rottenmeier and her strict adherence to discipline. She helps Heidi to learn to read through Grimms' Fairy Tales.

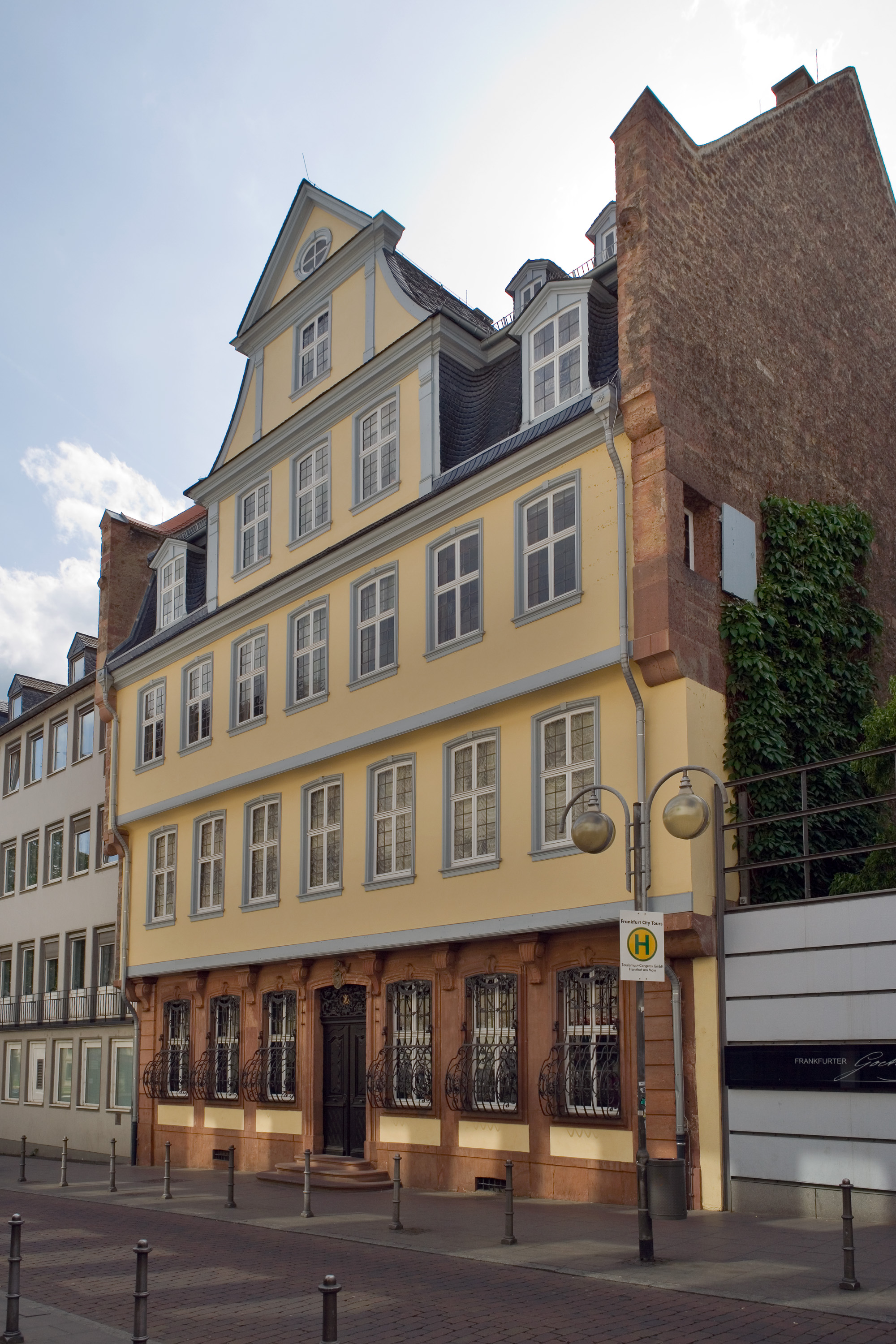
Goethe's house in Frankfurt, on which Clara's house is based in the 1974 anime and in the 2015 remake

== Production ==
In 1967, future Zuiyo founder Shigeto Takahashi, manager of TCJ at the time, produced a 5-minute pilot short for a series based on Johanna Spyri's novel, but the project was shelved until the new studio was founded. The series finally went into production in 1973, when a new pilot with character design by Yasuji Mori was produced as a test. This work however was never shown publicly and what remain of it are only a few cels and concept arts.

For an accurate depiction of the settings, Takahashi asked his staff to make a scout trip to Switzerland, so that they could carefully study the locations for the series. In summer of 1973, Isao Takahata, Hayao Miyazaki and new character designer (and animation director) Yōichi Kotabe made a two-day visit to Maienfeld and later they also traveled to Frankfurt in Germany. The results of their research were used as a reference in the design of the settings and backgrounds, and in the characters designs. The group stayed at the Heidialp hut which served as an inspiration for the grandfather's cottage. Before his trip to Switzerland, Kotabe had drawn Heidi with two pigtails based on Mori's previous design, but he removed them after a Swiss librarian told him that a 5-year-old girl who lives in the mountains wouldn't be able to tie one. For the grandfather's design, Kotabe took inspiration from a wooden carved figure in a local souvenir shop, which he quickly sketched without being noticed by the shopkeeper.

Many new episodic adventures were added to the narration to pad the story, especially in the first part of the series. One of the most notable changes is in the character of Peter, made considerably less hostile, when in the original novel he even breaks Clara's wheelchair out of jealousy.

== International broadcast ==
The Heidi, Girl of the Alps anime has been dubbed into about twenty languages. The TV series was able to reach major stardom in Asia, Europe, Latin America, the Arab world and South Africa.

Despite its success, the series was never officially broadcast in the home country of the original novel, Switzerland. There are various theories as to why this happened. A spokesperson for the German-language branch of the Swiss Broadcasting Corporation suggested that it may have been due to the overlap with the broadcast of the internationally co-produced live-action Heidi series in 1978. Another theory is that animation was considered vulgar in Switzerland at the time, but since television broadcasts from neighboring countries such as Germany, France and Italy were also available in Switzerland, Swiss viewers were able to watch Heidi through those networks.

=== Spanish versions ===
In Spain, the series debuted on TVE on May 2, 1975, simply titled Heidi. The show became one of the most popular anime of all time in Spain, enough to have its own Spanish merchandise, including toys and a comic book adaptation-turned-continuation of the series, published bi-weekly by Ediciones Recreativas and consisting of over an hundred issues in total from 1975 to 1981. Even though the theme songs and insert songs were kept in Japanese for the broadcast, they were recorded in Spanish by RCA for the soundtrack releases by uncredited singers, and in a series of albums that summarized the episodes. "Abuelito, dime tú" (Oshiete) became one of the best known children's songs in Spain and Heidi herself became one of both Sélica Torcal and Marisa Marco's most famous roles. The name "Rottenmeier" became synonymous with "uptight, straight-laced hag" among Spaniards and has subsequently been used to describe multiple female politicians and the Spanish parliament, among others in Spain. The woman was used as a bad type of 'potential' single, the suggestion coming from her first reference name "Fräulein" which means "unmarried woman".

A Latin Spanish dub was produced in 1978 in Mexico, with Heidi voiced by Cristina Camargo. This version, produced by Carlos Amador, reused for the broadcast the theme songs and insert songs recorded in Spain, which were also released on sound recordings. The series proved popular in all of Latin America, and the theme song Dime abuelito (credited to "Heidi") entered the Mexican charts in 1978, peaking at #5 on the 4 August 1978 chart.

=== Portuguese versions ===
In Portugal, the series was first broadcast from February 22, 1976, to May 22, 1977, on RTP1 in Japanese with Portuguese subtitles, but due to its success, it was later rebroadcast dubbed in Portuguese.

The Brazilian Portuguese dub was broadcast starting from 1980 by Rede Tupi, Rede Record, and later by SBT. The Brazilian version featured all the songs in Portuguese, which were released on an album during the broadcast. These songs were recorded by RCA Spain for the Portuguese market, although only the opening and ending themes had been released in Portugal in 1976.

=== German version ===
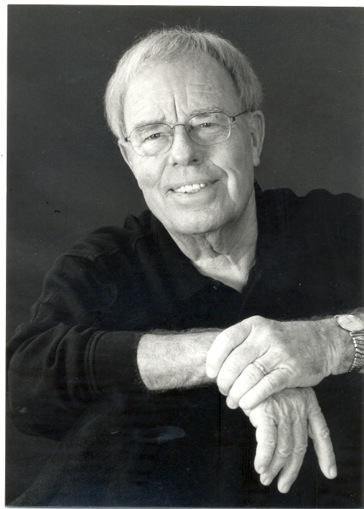
Christian Bruhn, the composer of "Heidi", famous German theme song version

The German-language version of the series was first broadcast in Austria on ORF, from May 28, 1977, to June 10, 1978, and later in Germany on ZDF, from September 18, 1977, to September 24, 1978. For the German broadcast, the licensing of the work was managed by German companies (Taurus Film and ZDF), which also carried out their own merchandising.

For the series' German dub, an entirely new soundtrack was composed; the in-episode compositions were created by Gert Wilden and the title song's music by Christian Bruhn and performed by the Schlager folk duo Gitti und Erika. The lyrics for the title song, which was simply titled "Heidi" were written by Andrea Wagner and Wolfgang Weinzierl, the last one who also made the script translations and dubbing direction. This German version of the theme song was also used in many other countries, with vocals performed in the respective languages. Apart from the title song, the German soundtrack does not include any other insert songs, but there are several small moments in the series where Heidi, Peter and Clara sing, and the recordings were kept in German in other countries as well. The background music makes frequent use of instruments associated with Switzerland, such as the alphorn, zither, and cowbells. Most of the musical pieces are variations on the same theme. The dub was produced in Munich by Beta-Technik, with 12-year-old actress Kristin Fiedler as Heidi.

=== French version ===
The series was dubbed in French in Quebec, where it was broadcast by Ici Radio-Canada Télé from September 24, 1977. The same dubbing was broadcast in Luxembourg on Télé Luxembourg from May 4, 1978, and in France on TF1 from December 26, 1979, to January 1, 1982. The French version was partly derived from the German one, from which it retained the opening theme, re-recorded in French. The French broadcast received a different opening theme from the one used in Quebec and Luxembourg, with slightly different lyrics, performed by Danielle Licari. The Japanese soundtrack by Takeo Watanabe was preserved, but later in the series, the German score by Gert Wilden was inserted into some scenes, particularly where songs had originally been featured.

=== Italian version ===
Heidi, Girl of the Alps was also a success in Italy. Its first broadcast was from February 7 to June 2, 1978, on Rai 1, and it had successful yearly re-runs. The title song of the Italian version was sung by Elisabetta Viviani. The Italian dub was produced by Rome-based company C.D., with Heidi voiced by 10-year-old actress Francesca Guadagno. The dub was made from the German one, so it features the same soundtrack and dialogue adaptation.

In Italy, also, the series was summed up and reassembled in three feature films, released in cinemas from 1978 through to 1979. The first of the three, Heidi in città ("Heidi in town"), released in 1978, summarizes the episodes in which the protagonist is brought to Frankfurt and befriends Clara, although the longing for her grandfather makes Heidi understand after many vicissitudes that she should go back to live in the mountains. The second, Heidi torna tra i monti ("Heidi goes back to the mountains"), also released in 1978, summarizes the latest episodes of the television series. Heidi, finally back with her grandfather, continues to maintain the friendship at a distance with Clara, who, precisely during a visit to the girl initially hampered by Mrs. Rottenmeier, will resume the use of her legs. The third feature to be released, Heidi a scuola ("Heidi at school"), released in 1979, sums up the first part of the series, which includes the arrival of Heidi in the mountains and the meeting with her grandfather. All three titles were officially distributed in 16mm by Sampaolo Film.

=== Arabic version ===
The series was dubbed and aired in the Arab world, and premiered in 1984. This dub was one of the first produced in the Persian Gulf, being a collaborative production between Kuwait and the United States. At that time, it was common for actors of various nationalities to participate in the first dubs in the Gulf area, so the same thing happened in this dub, which was made up of two casts of actors: the first, who worked from Kuwait, made up of actors from Lebanon and Jordan; and a second cast, made up of Arab actors residing in the USA, from Egypt and Jordan. Credited as production studios were United Studios Company (USC), from Kuwait; and to an American studio named Middle East Media Center, which according to the dub credits, is located in Hollywood. Said American studio was probably close to, or at least known to, the Egyptian-born American businessman Frank Agrama (Harmony Gold founder), who at that time worked, among other things, producing Arabic dubs of anime series with a cast of actors of Arab origin, but who lived in the USA, several of whom would participate both in the Arabic dub of Little Lulu and Her Little Friends, which was recorded entirely in the USA, and in this collaborative dub by Heidi, with the American staff. This dub was released in Saudi Arabia on KSA TV in 1984, and on Kuwait TV in 1986, with great success, to the point that in these two countries the series has been broadcast several times in recent years. Also, the series has been shown in numerous Arab countries, such as Bahrain, Jordan, Lebanon, Oman, Palestine, Qatar, Syria and the UAE.

The dub included the participation of Nahed Fahim (Heidi, Narrator, Additional Voices), Gashan Al-Mashini (Alm-Onji, Additional Voices), Zuhair Awadh (Peter, Additional Voices), Samira Shamiya (Clara, Dete, Additional Voices), Feryal Qassem (Miss Rottenmeier, Peter's Mom, Additional Voices), and Zuhair Haddad. The dub director was Ghassan Al-Mashini. The translation was done by Afaf and Saba Bader.

It had an original Arabic opening theme, which was different from the original Japanese opening theme. The musical theme was composed by the Egyptian Adel Asfour, and was sung by the Jordanian interpreter Sameera Nimri, who would also interpret the Arabic ending, and other additional songs. For the dub, an own soundtrack was composed, replacing the original Japanese soundtrack, but it was not dispensed with, since the Arabic soundtrack is mixed with the Japanese one in several scenes, and even many songs from the Japanese version are reinterpreted, such as the original Japanese opening. All these compositions and arrangements were also made by Adel Asfour, and were recorded in the USA, the same country where the final mixing and editing would be done.

=== Afrikaans version and South African English theme single ===
The German version was re-dubbed for the South African Broadcasting Corporation (SABC) by Leephy Studios, and was popular in South Africa during the late 1970s and early 1980s with a number of re-runs. While the (German) theme song was not initially dubbed into Afrikaans, multiple covers of it in the language exist, including by Carike Keuzenkamp and Kurt Darren, the latter released in 2012 and which makes brand new verses for the song. They describe his childhood memories of Heidi herself and current thoughts of her, including of potentially contacting her by phone, as well as inviting her somewhere. Later, updated versions of the animated TV series contained the theme song in Afrikaans for the South African audience. At the time the original animated TV series was released in South Africa in 1978, "Heidi" had also been sung in English by artist Peter Lotis, and was released as a single. It attained the Number 2 position on the Springbok Charts on 16 June 1978, and remained on the charts for 13 weeks.

=== English versions ===
An English dub was made possibly in Philippines, and was broadcast on Cartoon Network India in 2001. The dub has never been released on home media and is hard to find. This dub, about which there is almost no information, is the only known dub of the complete series in English, and which has been proven a real dub.

Despite this series' international popularity, the full series is less well known in the US and UK. The only version of this anime to have been commercially released in the United States and United Kingdom is a feature-length film version of the TV series, created in 1975 according to the copyright, but was only released on May 7, 1980. It was later released to home video in both continents in 1985 by Pacific Arts Corporation under the title The Story of Heidi. This version was produced by Claudio Guzman and Charles Ver Halen, with the English translation and dialogue by Dick Strome and featured a voice cast including Randi Kiger as Heidi, Billy Whitaker as Peter, Michelle Laurita as Clara, Vic Perrin as the Alm Uncle, the Doctor and Postman, Alan Reed (who died in 1977) as Sebastian and Mr. Usher, and Janet Waldo as Aunt Dete. The version is distilled to only a small number of central episodes, as well as so two of the sub-plots (of the adopted Pichi and Meow, respectively) were part of the main plot instead, as well as cutting many other scenes of the episodes, either by shortening them or, most often, removing them entirely. The film features excerpt of Takeo Watanabe soundtrack, but used in different sequences than the series. This dub also changes the name of the dog Josef to Bernard, ostensibly because he is a St. Bernard, as well as Pichi to Binky Bird. It aired on Nickelodeon's Special Delivery anthology series in 1988 and HBO in the 1980s.

== Reception ==
Heidi, Girl of the Alps is still popular in Japan today—the love for Heidi has drawn thousands of Japanese tourists to the Swiss Alps. Stamps featuring Heidi have been issued by Japan Post. Japanese heavy metal rock band Animetal made a cover of the show's original theme song. In the documentary about Studio Ghibli, The Kingdom of Dreams and Madness, Miyazaki refers to Heidi as Takahata's "masterpiece".

== Episode list ==
| No. | Title | Directed by | Written by | Original release date |
|---|---|---|---|---|
| 1 | "To the Mountain"; Transliteration: "Arumu no Yama e" (アルムの山へ) | Keiji Hayakawa | Yoshihiro Yoshida | January 6, 1974 |
Heidi is taken to her grandfather's house by her Aunt Dete.
| 2 | "In Grandfather's House"; Transliteration: "Ojiisan no Yamagoya" (おじいさんの山小屋) | Keiji Hayakawa | Kazuyoshi Yokota | January 13, 1974 |
Heidi joyfully gets accustomed to her new surroundings.
| 3 | "To the Pastures"; Transliteration: "Bokujou de" (牧場で) | Keiji Hayakawa | Yoshihiro Yoshida | January 20, 1974 |
Heidi goes with Peter, the local goatherd, to the pastures and enjoys a day of fun-filled picnic there.
| 4 | "One More in the Family"; Transliteration: "Mou Hitori no Kazoku" (もう一人の家族) | Kazuyoshi Yokota | Yoshiyuki Tomino | January 27, 1974 |
While out on the pastures one day, Heidi encounters a storm. After braving it, she finds a nestling and decides to raise it.
| 5 | "The Burnt Letter"; Transliteration: "Moeta Tegami" (燃えた手紙) | Keiji Hayakawa | Masao Kuroda | February 3, 1974 |
Pichi is taken by Heidi to the mountain pastures and has another thrillingly exciting day filled with dangers. Meanwhile, through Peter, Alm-Uncle receives a letter from Aunt Dete, intending to take Heidi to Frankfurt, which he destroys, acting as if it does not concern him.
| 6 | "Whistle Louder"; Transliteration: "Hibike Kuchibue" (ひびけ口笛) | Tsunehisa Kozonoi | Shuji Yamazaki | February 10, 1974 |
One day, in her attempts to learn how to be a goatherd, Heidi tries milking a goat and whistling, eventually succeeding.
| 7 | "The Fir's Whisper"; Transliteration: "Momi no Ki no Oto" (樅の木の音) | Yoshiyuki Tomino | Hisao Okawa | February 17, 1974 |
With high winds in the mountain pastures, Alm-Uncle decides not to let Heidi go to the mountains. Instead, she helps her grandfather make cheese, but Snowflake, a baby goat, comes to her anyway, leading her to unintentionally ruin the cheese.
| 8 | "Where Has Pichi Gone?"; Transliteration: "Pitchi yo Doko e" (ピッチーよどこへ) | Keiji Hayakawa | Shuji Yamazaki | February 24, 1974 |
Pichi follows the seasonal birds, and Heidi finds it hard to calm down. Alm-Uncle takes her to collect chestnuts and grapes. Meanwhile, to make up for a previous quarrel, Peter captures a Pichi-looking bird and gives it to Heidi. Heidi releases it and gives chestnuts and grapes to Peter to make up.
| 9 | "The Snowy Alps"; Transliteration: "Hakugin no Arumu" (白銀のアルム) | Tsunehisa Kozonoi | Masao Kuroda | March 3, 1974 |
Winter arrives, bringing long hours indoors. Heidi arranges food under the cover of the three fir trees for herbivores and tries to befriend the animals.
| 10 | "A Visit to Grandmother's House"; Transliteration: "Obaasan no Ie e" (おばあさんの家へ) | Kazuyoshi Yokota | Yoshiyuki Tomino | March 10, 1974 |
After the snowfall ceases, Heidi is taken by her grandfather on a sled to Peter's grandmother, as per her invitation. There, Heidi learns of the grandmother's blindness and cries. She asks her grandfather to repair Peter's dilapidated home so the blind grandmother can find comfort.
| 11 | "Snowstorm"; Transliteration: "Fubuki no Hi ni" (吹雪の日に) | Keiji Hayakawa | Hiroshi Saito | March 17, 1974 |
Hunters try to get the herbivores Heidi feeds but are stopped. Later, Heidi sends Alm-Uncle to rescue the hunters after they venture out again. After much worry, Grandpa returns with them safely.
| 12 | "Sounds of Spring"; Transliteration: "Haru no Oto" (春の音) | Masao Kuroda | Yoshihiro Yoshida | March 24, 1974 |
With spring arriving in the mountains, there are dangers of sudden avalanches. On returning from a sled race after giving Peter's grandmother a spring flower, they encounter an avalanche. Thanks to Alm-Uncle's quick action, they are saved instantly.
| 13 | "Return to the Meadows"; Transliteration: "Futatabi Bokujou e" (再び牧場へ) | Keiji Hayakawa | Yoshiyuki Tomino | March 31, 1974 |
With spring officially back, Peter and Heidi return to the meadows with their flock. Peter gets into a fight with another herder who accuses him of trying to steal his stranded goat. Joseph's intimidating presence scares the individual off.
| 14 | "Sad News"; Transliteration: "Kanashii Shirase" (悲しいしらせ) | Tsunehisa Kozonoi | Tsunehisa Kozonoi | April 7, 1974 |
Heidi's favorite goat, Snowflake, is about to be sent to the slaughterhouse because it stopped giving milk. Heidi attempts to prevent this by gathering nutritional herbs from mountain crevices.
| 15 | "Snowflake"; Transliteration: "Yuki-chan" (ユキちゃん) | Kazuyoshi Yokota | Hiroshi Saito | April 14, 1974 |
Mr. Strahl, the owner of Snowflake, is convinced not to slaughter the goat after Heidi demonstrates its increased milk yield.
| 16 | "Dorfli"; Transliteration: "Derufi Mura" (デルフリ村) | Masao Kuroda | Hisao Okawa | April 21, 1974 |
Heidi visits Dorfli to check on Snowflake. On returning, she talks to Alm-Uncle about going to school, but he flatly refuses.
| 17 | "Unexpected Visitors"; Transliteration: "Futari no Okyakusama" (二人のお客さま) | Tsunehisa Kozonoi | Fumio Ikeno | April 28, 1974 |
The local church pastor tries to convince Alm-Uncle to let Heidi attend school but is refused. Then Aunt Dete arrives, unwilling to accept no for an answer.
| 18 | "The Departure"; Transliteration: "Hanarebanare ni" (離ればなれに) | Kazuyoshi Yokota | Yoshiyuki Tomino | May 5, 1974 |
After threatening legal action, Alm-Uncle angrily allows Heidi to go with Dete to Frankfurt, despite protests from Peter and her grandmother. Heidi goes, unaware that Dete lied about it being a day trip.
| 19 | "On the Road to Frankfurt"; Transliteration: "Furankufuruto e" (フランクフルトへ) | Keiji Hayakawa | Shuji Yamazaki | May 12, 1974 |
Through coaxing, forcing, and lying, Dete takes Heidi to Frankfurt, where she becomes the playmate of an invalid child, Clara. Upon arrival, she is introduced to the governess Rottenmeier, who is strict, and Dete leaves.
| 20 | "A New Life"; Transliteration: "Atarashii Seikatsu" (新らしい生活) | Masao Kuroda | Mamoru Sasaki | May 19, 1974 |
After a sleepy dinner, Heidi's life in Frankfurt begins. She is constantly nagged by Rottenmeier and disappointed when she sees that the window blinds do not show the mountains. She endures it to bring tobacco and white bread to her grandmother and grandfather.
| 21 | "I Want to Fly"; Transliteration: "Jiyuu ni Tobitai" (自由に飛びたい) | Kazuyoshi Yokota | Yoshiyuki Tomino | May 26, 1974 |
During lessons and punishments, Heidi empathizes with Clara's condition through her pet caged bird, which Clara also owns.
| 22 | "Where Are the Mountains?"; Transliteration: "Tooi Arumu" (遠いアルム) | Keiji Hayakawa | Hiroshi Saito | June 2, 1974 |
Heidi, avoiding Rottenmeier's gaze, explores the city but finds only a dreary urban landscape.
| 23 | "The Great Commotion"; Transliteration: "Oosawagoto" (大騒動) | Yoshiyuki Tomino | Yoshihiro Yoshida | June 9, 1974 |
Heidi receives a kitten from the kind church tower maintainer and hides it in the attic with the help of the manservant Sebastian. Other kittens sent to her are promptly returned because Rottenmeier cannot handle them, along with a turtle that came from a street musician boy.
| 24 | "The Stray Cat"; Transliteration: "Suterareta Mii-chan" (捨てられたミーちゃん) | Kazuyoshi Yokota | Masao Kuroda | June 16, 1974 |
Rottenmeier discovers the hidden kitten and throws it away. Heidi leaves, but Sebastian assures her that the kitten is safe at a friend's house.
| 25 | "The White Breads"; Transliteration: "Shiro Pan" (白パン) | Keiji Hayakawa | Hiroshi Saito | June 23, 1974 |
On a routine inspection, Rottenmeier finds all the white bread Heidi stored for Peter's grandmother and confiscates it. Heidi wails, but Clara consoles her by saying the bread was already molded and cheering her up with a fairy tale.
| 26 | "The Return of Herr Sesemann"; Transliteration: "Zezeman-san no Okaeri" (ゼーゼマンさんのお帰り) | Tsunehisa Kozonoi | Hisao Okawa | June 30, 1974 |
Mr. Sesemann returns to visit Clara and is impressed with Heidi's companionship with her. He later informs Clara's grandmother, which annoys Rottenmeier but delights Heidi.
| 27 | "Another Grandmother"; Transliteration: "Obaasama" (おばあさま) | Yoshiyuki Tomino | Mamoru Sasaki | July 7, 1974 |
Clara's grandmother becomes an instant favorite of both girls and spends a fun-filled day with them. For once, Heidi does not think about the mountains.
| 28 | "A Tour to the Woods"; Transliteration: "Mori e Ikou" (森へ行こう) | Keiji Hayakawa | Shuji Yamazaki | July 14, 1974 |
After seeing Heidi cry over a picture of the mountains, the grandmother takes both girls for a picnic in a state park, much to Rottenmeier's chagrin.
| 29 | "Two Hearts"; Transliteration: "Futatsu no Kokoro" (ふたつのこころ) | Tsunehisa Kozonoi | Yoshiyuki Tomino | July 21, 1974 |
After a day at the park, Clara falls ill.
| 30 | "I Want to Catch the Sun"; Transliteration: "Ohisama o Tsukamaetai" (お陽さまをつかまえたい) | Kazuyoshi Yokota | Hiroshi Saito | July 28, 1974 |
To cure Clara, Heidi returns to the park to gather sunshine, butterflies, and flowers, which improves her condition.
| 31 | "Goodbye, Grandmamma"; Transliteration: "Sayonara Obaasama" (さようならおばあさま) | Keiji Hayakawa | Seiichi Okuda | August 4, 1974 |
Grandma leaves after a mock wedding party, returning Heidi to her dreary city life.
| 32 | "A Rough Night"; Transliteration: "Arashi no Yoru" (あらしの夜) | Tsunehisa Kozonoi | Shuji Yamazaki | August 11, 1974 |
Heidi is torn between wanting to leave her confined situation and not abandoning lonely Clara, when a nightly ghost appears in the Sesemann mansion.
| 33 | "Ghost Commotion"; Transliteration: "Yuurei Sowado" (ゆうれい騒動) | Kazuyoshi Yokota | Yoshiyuki Tomino | August 18, 1974 |
Everyone is frightened by the ghost, but no one realizes it is Heidi sleepwalking, stressed and longing for the Alps. The doctor discovers this and convinces Mr. Sesemann and Clara, resolving the situation.
| 34 | "To My Dear Mountains"; Transliteration: "Natsukashi no Yama e" (なつかしの山へ) | Keiji Hayakawa | Kazuyoshi Yokota | August 25, 1974 |
Heidi returns to the Alps and is reunited with her grandfather, wearing the same clothes she had when she was five.
| 35 | "The Starry Sky of the Alps"; Transliteration: "Arumu no Hoshizora" (アルムの星空) | Masao Kuroda | Yoshihiro Yoshida | September 1, 1974 |
Heidi relives all the experiences she missed while in Frankfurt.
| 36 | "And To the Pastures"; Transliteration: "Soshite Bokujou e" (そして牧場へ) | Kazuyoshi Yokota | Keiji Hayakawa | September 8, 1974 |
Heidi spends an adventure-filled day with Peter and the goats, including discovering a new mountain-top lake.
| 37 | "Goat's Baby"; Transliteration: "Yagi no Akachan" (山羊のあかちゃん) | Yoshiyuki Tomino | Hisao Okawa | September 15, 1974 |
Heidi begins writing letters to Clara and reading hymn books to Peter's grandmother. Alm-Uncle decides to repair a rundown house in Dorfli so Heidi can conveniently attend school in winter.
| 38 | "In a New House"; Transliteration: "Atarashii Ie de" (新しい家で) | Kazuyoshi Yokota | Shuji Yamazaki | September 22, 1974 |
On the first day of winter school, Peter does not attend as he is running an errand for a Dorfli resident.
| 39 | "Don't Give Up, Peter!"; Transliteration: "Ganbare Peeta!" (がんばれペーター) | Keiji Hayakawa | Seiichi Okuda | September 29, 1974 |
During a sled race, Peter competes using his carpentry skills and finishes jointly in first place, splitting the prize.
| 40 | "I Want To Go To the Alps"; Transliteration: "Arumu e Ikitai" (アルムへ行きたい) | Kazuyoshi Yokota | Yoshiyuki Tomino | October 6, 1974 |
Clara insists on visiting the Alps to see Heidi. Mr. Sesemann arranges for a doctor to evaluate whether the Alps are suitable for Clara's health.
| 41 | "The Doctor's Promise"; Transliteration: "Oisha-sama no Yakusoku" (お医者さまの約束) | Shuji Yamazaki | Mamoru Sasaki | October 13, 1974 |
The doctor visits the Alps. Heidi shows him the mountains, and although he doubts the terrain is suitable for Clara, he is persuaded by her plea.
| 42 | "Reunion With Clara"; Transliteration: "Kurara to no Saikai" (クララとの再会) | Kazuyoshi Yokota | Yoshiyuki Tomino | October 20, 1974 |
Heidi prepares the Dorfli winter home for Clara, who receives a warm welcome.
| 43 | "Clara's Wish"; Transliteration: "Kurara no Negai" (クララの願い) | Keiji Hayakawa | Seiichi Okuda | October 27, 1974 |
Clara is enchanted by the mountainside and wishes to stay in Heidi's hut. Her wish is granted, much to Rottenmeier's annoyance.
| 44 | "A Little Plan"; Transliteration: "Chiisana Keikaku" (小さな計画) | Kazuyoshi Yokota | Yoshiyuki Tomino | November 3, 1974 |
After skipping lessons and enjoying the mountain soil, Clara asks Heidi for mountain flowers. Together, they plan a picnic on the mountain.
| 45 | "Children of the Mountain"; Transliteration: "Yama no Kodomotachi" (山の子たち) | Keiji Hayakawa | Seiichi Okuda | November 10, 1974 |
Peter tries to carry Clara up the mountain using his spare pants, but it is too strenuous for him, so he looks for alternatives.
| 46 | "Clara's Happiness"; Transliteration: "Kurara no Shiawase" (クララのしあわせ) | Kazuyoshi Yokota | Yoshiyuki Tomino | November 17, 1974 |
Clara enjoys her days in the mountains with Heidi and Peter, braving a mountain shower and reading to Peter's blind grandmother.
| 47 | "Hello, Grandmother!"; Transliteration: "Konnichiwa Obaasama" (こんにちわおばあさま) | Keiji Hayakawa | Shuji Yamazaki | November 24, 1974 |
Clara's grandmother visits and immediately sends Rottenmeier away, enjoying time with Heidi and Clara.
| 48 | "A Small Hope"; Transliteration: "Chiisana Kibou" (小さな希望) | Kazuyoshi Yokota | Seiichi Okuda | December 1, 1974 |
Clara shows promising signs of standing up, though not fully consciously. Her grandmother takes her to Heidi's lake to encourage her.
| 49 | "A Promise"; Transliteration: "Hitotsu no Chikai" (ひとつの誓い) | Keiji Hayakawa | Yoshiyuki Tomino | December 8, 1974 |
Clara practices standing with Heidi's help, though she remains uncertain. During the farewell party of Clara's grandmother, school friends join the celebration, motivating Clara.
| 50 | "Try to Stand"; Transliteration: "Tatte Goran" (立ってごらん) | Kazuyoshi Yokota | Seiichi Okuda | December 15, 1974 |
Clara attempts to stand using handrails, encouraged by Heidi.
| 51 | "Clara Walks"; Transliteration: "Kurara ga Aruita" (クララが歩いた) | Keiji Hayakawa | Yoshiyuki Tomino | December 22, 1974 |
Clara starts walking properly, surprising her father, Mr. Sesemann.
| 52 | "Until We Meet Again"; Transliteration: "Mata Au Hi Made" (また会う日まで) | Kazuyoshi Yokota | Seiichi Okuda | December 29, 1974 |
Clara leaves for treatment at Bad Ragaz. Heidi wonders when they will meet again to enjoy the Alps together.

== Music ==
All the songs in the series are written by Eriko Kishida, composed by Takeo Watanabe and arranged by Yuji Matsuyama. The album with the songs was first published in Japan in May 1974 by Nippon Columbia (Catalog# KKS-4098).

Opening theme:

"Tell me" (おしえて, Oshiete), sung by Kayoko Ishū with yodeling by Nelly Schwartz.

Ending theme:

"Wait and See" (まっててごらん, Mattete Goran), sung by Kumiko Ōsugi, with yodeling by Nelly Schwartz.

Insert songs:

- "Yuki and me" (ユキとわたし, Yuki to watashi), sung by Kumiko Ōsugi. Another rendition of the song is sung by Heidi's voice actress Kazuko Sugiyama.
- "Evening song" (夕方の歌, Yūgata no uta) sung by Kumiko Ōsugi.
- "Lullaby of the Alms" (アルムの子守唄, Arumu no komoriuta), sung by Nelly Schwartz. Another rendition of the song is sung by Kayoko Ishū.
- "Peter and me" (ペーターとわたし, Pētā to watashi), sung by Kumiko Ōsugi.

== Film ==
Episodes 4 and 45 of the series were theatrically released in Japan in blow-up format during Tōhō Champion Matsuri, on March 21, 1974, and March 12, 1975, respectively.

A feature-length film was edited from the series by Zuiyo (which by then was a separate entity from Nippon Animation, which employed many of the TV series' animation staff) and released in Japanese theaters by Toho on March 17, 1979. All cast were replaced excluding Heidi and the grandfather. The film was supervised by Sumiko Nakao, with no direct involvement from Isao Takahata and Hayao Miyazaki, since they had already left both Zuiyo and Nippon Animation by 1979.

== OVAs ==
The series was summarized in two OVAs, Heidi, Girl of the Alps: Alm Mountain Chapter (アルプスの少女ハイジ アルムの山編, Arupusu no shōjo Haiji Arumu no yama-hen), 89 minutes long, covering the first part, and Heidi, Girl of the Alps: Heidi and Clara Chapter (アルプスの少女ハイジ ハイジとクララ編, Arupusu no shōjo Haiji Haiji to Kurara-hen), 91 minutes long, covering the second part. The actors' voices were re-recorded in a new Hi-Fi stereo format. The two titles were released by Zuiyo on VHS and LaserDisc on April 21, 1993, and later on DVD.

== Remake ==
In 2015, an eponymous remake of the series has been produced by Belgian production house Studio 100. The series is an international co-production between various countries and consists of 39 episodes. A 26-episode second season featuring an entirely original plot was produced in 2019.

== Parodies ==
A parody also produced by Zuiyo, Arupusu no Shōjo Haiji? Chara Onji, has been broadcast by Fuji TV in the television show #Hi_Poul between 2016 and 2017. The series consists of 130 10-second shorts featuring Heidi's Grandfather.

Alps no Rōjin Heidi no Ojiisan is a spin-off short comedy anime streaming on the YouTube channel Sukima no Anime that started in December 2024. It is a crossover between Heidi, Girl of the Alps and the web anime Sorotani no Animecchi, where all the characters speak in Kansai dialect and engage in boke and tsukkomi banter.
