= Heidi Hanselmann =

Swiss politician

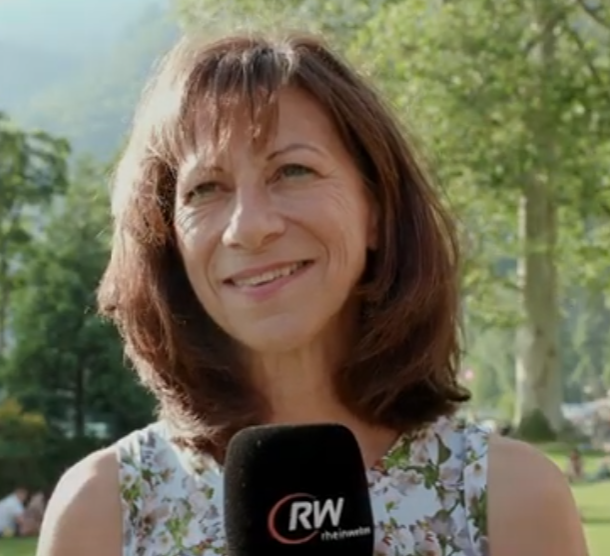
- In a 2019 interview
- Born: 12 April 1961 (age 65); Rorschacherberg, Switzerland
- Occupation: Politician
- Political party: Social Democratic

Heidi Hanselmann (born 12 April 1961) is a Swiss politician of the Social Democratic Party of Switzerland. She has been a member of the cantonal government of St. Gallen since 2004 and heads the Department of Health. She served as President of the Cantonal Government in 2008/09, 2014/2015, and 2019/2020. On 15 October 2019, she announced her resignation from the government at the end of May 2020.

== Political career ==
After joining the Social Democratic Party in 1996, Hanselmann was directly elected to the Cantonal Council of St. Gallen. As a teacher, Hanselmann focused on education issues in the Cantonal Council. In 2004, Hanselmann was elected to the government, of which she was president in 2008/09, 2014/2015 and 2019/2020. Her greatest political success was the referendum she won in November 2014, in which the people of St. Gallen overwhelmingly approved Hanselmann's hospital policy and the necessary funding of almost one billion francs. From 2016 to 2019, she was vice-president of the Conference of Cantonal Health Ministers (GDK), of which she took over the presidency on 1 May 2019. From 2020, Hanselmann chaired the Schweizer Paraplegiker-Stiftung.
