= Yours =

Yours may refer to:

== Music ==
=== Albums ===
- Yours (Nathaniel album), a 2015 album by Nathaniel Willemse
- Yours (Russell Dickerson album), a 2017 album by Russell Dickerson
- Yours (Sara Gazarek album), a 2005 album by Sara Gazarek

=== Songs ===
- "Yours" (Conan Gray song), 2022
- "Yours" (Ella Henderson song), 2014
- "Yours" (Post Malone song), 2024
- "Yours" (Raiden and Chanyeol song), 2020
- "Yours" (Russell Dickerson song), 2015
- "Yours" (Steven Curtis Chapman song), 2008
- "Yours" (Quiéreme mucho), a 1911 criolla-bolero by Gonzalo Roig
- "Yours", a 2021 song by King Gizzard & the Lizard Wizard from Butterfly 3000
- "Yours", a 2014 song by M.I from The Chairman
- "Yours", a 2002 song by Mariah Carey from Charmbracelet

== Other uses ==
- Yours, the possessive pronoun version of you
- "Yours", a form of valediction, especially at the end of a written communication
- "Yours", a 1943 commonly used name of the World War II poem "The Life That I Have"
- Yours (film), a 2010 Spanish fantasy drama film

== See also ==
- Yaws, a tropical infection of the skin, bones and joints
- you (disambiguation)
- Eternally Yours (disambiguation)
- Forever Yours (disambiguation)
- Sincerely Yours (disambiguation)
- Yours Sincerely (disambiguation)
- Yours truly (disambiguation)
