= Yours truly =

Yours truly may refer to:

- "Yours truly", a form of valediction, especially at the end of a written communication

== Music ==
- Yours Truly (band), an Australian pop-punk band formed in 2016
- Yours Truly (Air Supply album) or the title song, 2001
- Yours Truly (Ariana Grande album), 2013
- Yours Truly (Cromok album), 1996
- Yours Truly (Earl Thomas Conley album), 1991
- Yours Truly (Rick Braun album), 2005
- Yours Truly (Sick of It All album), 2000
- Yours Truly (Sublime with Rome album), 2011
- Yours Truly, an album by Bent Van Looy, 2018
- Yours Truly: The I'm Yours Collection, an EP by Jason Mraz, 2009
- "Yours Truly" (song), by Blindspott, 2005

== Other uses ==
- Yours Truly (2018 film), an Indian romantic drama film
- Yours Truly, a character in the 1992 novel Snow Crash by Neal Stephenson

== See also ==
- Ai Weiwei: Yours Truly, a 2019 American documentary film
- Yours Truly Theatre, Bangalore, a theatre group in India
- Sincerely Yours (disambiguation)
- Yours Sincerely (disambiguation)
- Yours (disambiguation)
- Truly (disambiguation)
