= Sincerely Yours =

Sincerely Yours may refer to:

- "Sincerely Yours", a valediction in written correspondence

== Film ==
- Sincerely Yours (film), a 1955 American romantic music comedy featuring Liberace
- Sincerely Yours..., a 1985 Soviet comedy
- "I need you", known in Japan as "Sincerely Yours", the second half of the 1997 anime film The End of Evangelion

== Music ==
- Sincerely Yours (record label), a Swedish record label

=== Albums ===
- Sincerely Yours (Iamsu! album) or the title song, 2014
- Sincerely Yours (Jo Stafford album), 2006
- Sincerely Yours... (Robert Goulet album), 1962
- Sincerely Yours (Luv' album) or the title song, 1991
- Sincerely Yours (One Voice album), 2001
- Sincerely Yours (Bomb Zombies EP) or the title song, 2010
- Sincerely Yours, an EP by Teairra Marí, 2010

=== Songs ===
- "Sincerely Yours" (Kylie Minogue song), 2018
- "Sincerely Yours"/"Can You Feel the Power of Words", a double A-side single by Rina Aiuchi, 2002
- "Sincerely Yours", by Sweet Sensation from Take It While It's Hot, 1988

== See also ==
- Valediction
- Yours Sincerely (disambiguation)
- Yours truly (disambiguation)
- Yours (disambiguation)
- Sincerely (disambiguation)
