= Olivia Trappeniers =

Belgian singer

Olivia Trappeniers (OT) (Olivia)
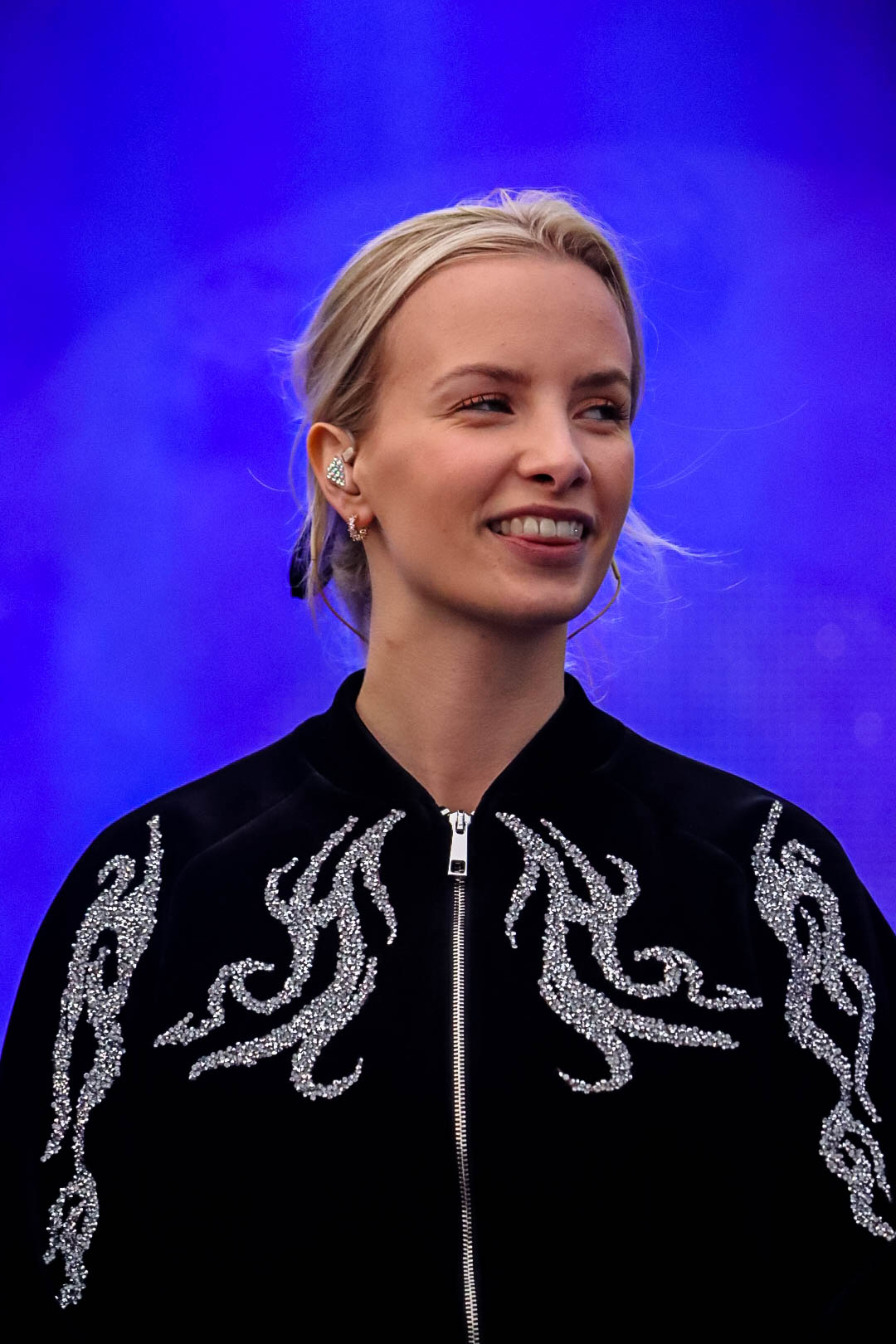
- Trappeniers in 2021

Background information
- Born: Olivia Trappeniers; 12 August 1997 (age 29)
- Origin: Deurne, Antwerp, Belgium
- Genre: Pop
- Occupation: Singer

Olivia Trappeniers (born in Deurne, on 12 August 1997), better known by the acronym and stage name OT (to 2021) and by her mononym Olivia (since 2021), is a Belgian Flemish singer.

Trappeniers was born in Deurne, a suburb of Antwerp. She took part in The Voice van Vlaanderen the Belgian Flemish version of the television contest The Voice in 2016, auditioning with Taylor Swift song "Blank Space" and defaulted to Bent Van Looy's team. She only made to the first live show before being eliminated. Trappeniers gained some fame after winning the first edition of Belgian MNM radio station's Rising Star competition, with a cover of Martin Garrix's song "There for You". In 2017, she released the song "You Have a Heart" with Belgian Flemish DJ and producer Regi. The single was certified gold record. That was followed with two more hits "Where Is My Love?" and "Bad Advice". In June 2019, DJ Regi released "Summer Life" featuring her as OT with Jaap Reesema credited by his stage name Jake Reese. The release was certified platinum.

On November 1, 2019, Trappeniers released her debut EP Confessions with six solo songs. In 2020, she took part in the television program Liefde voor muziek (meaning For the love of music) on the TV channel VTM. Her song "Come a Little Closer" sung by her with Jake Reese won the Belgian Radio 2 Zomerhit (summerhit) award.

== Discography ==
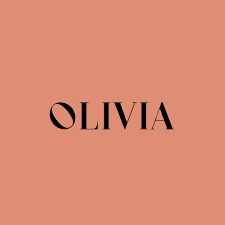
Logo of Olivia since 2021

=== EPs ===
- 2019: Confessions EP

=== Singles ===
(Singles from 2017 to 2020 credited to OT. 2021 singles onward, credited to Olivia)

List of singles as lead artist, with selected chart positions and certifications
| Title | Year | Peak chart positions | Album |
| Title | Year | BEL (FL) | Album |
|---|---|---|---|
| "There For You" (Acoustic) | 2017 | 3* (Ultratip) | Non-album single |
| "Half the World Away" | 2017 | Tip | Non-album single |
| "You Have a Heart" (with Regi) | 2017 | 3 | MNM Big Hits 2018 Vol. 1' |
| "Let You Go" (with BVD Kult) | 2018 | 45 | Non-album single |
| "Where Is My Love" | 2018 | 18 | Confessions |
| "Bad Advice" | 2019 | 20* (Ultratip) | Confessions |
| "Bad Boys" | 2019 | 2* (Ultratip) | Confessions |
| "Can't Break a Broken Heart" | 2021 | 17 | TBA |
| "La Di Da" | 2021 | 18 | TBA |
| "Unforgettable Night" | 2021 | 30 | TBA |
| "Don't Need It" | 2022 | 36 | TBA |
| "Elektriciteit" (with Paul Sinha) | 2022 | 21 | TBA |

=== Songs featured in ===
List of singles as lead artist, with selected chart positions and certifications
| Title | Year | Peak chart positions | Album |
| Title | Year | BEL (FL) | Album |
|---|---|---|---|
| "Summer Life" (Regi feat. Jake Reese & OT) | 2017 | 5 | Vergeet de tijd |
| "Moi Lolita" (Palm Trees feat. OT) | 2017 | Tip | MNM Big Hits 2019 Vol. 4 |
| "Kom wat dichterbij" (Regi feat. Jake Reese & OT) | 2020 | 1 | Liefde voor muziek (2020) |
| "Zo ver weg ()" (Regi feat. Jake Reese & OT) | 2020 | 26 | Liefde voor muziek (2020) |
| "They Don't Know" (Regi feat. OT) | 2020 | 4* (Ultratip) | Liefde voor muziek (2020) |
