= The Voice van Vlaanderen =

Belgian reality singing competition

- Genre: Reality competition
- Created by: John de Mol Jr. Roel van Velzen
- Presented by: An Lemmens; Sean Dhondt; Sam De Bruyn; Aaron Blommaert; Gloria Monserez; Aster Nzeyimana
- Judges: Natalia Druyts; Koen Wauters; Jasper Steverlinck; Alex Callier; Axelle Red; Regi Penxten; Bent Van Looy; Bart Peeters; Tourist LeMC; Niels Destadsbader; Laura Tesoro; Mathieu Terryn; Jan Paternoster; Joost Klein
- Composer: Martijn Schimmer
- Country of origin: Belgium
- Original language: Dutch
- No. of series: 10

Production
- Producers: Talpa Media Group (2011–2019); ITV Studios (2021–present)

Original release
- Network: vtm
- Release: November 25, 2011 – present

Promotional photograph of the Coaches of The Voice van Vlaanderen

The Voice van Vlaanderen is a Belgian reality talent show for the Flemish region of Belgium. It premiered on 25 November 2011 on VTM. The show is based on the original The Voice of Holland, created by John de Mol, and is part of The Voice (franchise). To date, it has aired a total of ten seasons.

The show consists of four stages: producers' auditions, blind auditions, battle rounds, and live shows. So far, ten winners have been crowned: Glenn Claes, Paulien Mathues, Tom De Man, Lola Obasuyi, Luka Cruysberghs, Ibe Wuyts, Grace Khuabi, Louise Goedefroy, Christophe Verholle and the most recent, Bas Serra.

The coaches for the current tenth season are Koen Wauters, Mathieu Terryn, Laura Tesoro, Joost Klein and Maarten & Dorothee for the Comeback Stage. Previous coaches have included Natalia Druyts, Alex Callier, Jasper Steverlinck, Regi Penxten, Axelle Red, Bent Van Looy, Bart Peeters, Tourist LeMC, Niels Destadsbader and Jan Paternoster.

In the seventh season, Tesoro served as a fifth coach for the Comeback Stage, where eliminated contestants were given a chance to return to the competition and join the live shows. She stepped down after the ninth season and returned as a main coach in season 10, with Maarten & Dorothee taking over the Comeback Stage role.

The success of The Voice van Vlaanderen has led to the creation of spin-off shows based on its format, including The Voice Kids and The Voice Senior.

== Format ==
The original format features four different stages: Producers' auditions, Blind auditions, Battles, and Live shows.

=== Producers' Auditions and Blind Auditions ===
The first stage is the producers' auditions, a pre-selection which is not shown on television.

Each season begins with the "Blind Auditions", where the coaches form their teams of artists to mentor throughout the competition. During the auditions, the coaches’ chairs face away from the stage. If a coach is interested in an artist, they press their button, turning their chair and revealing the phrase "I want you." At the end of the performance, the artist either joins the only coach who turned or chooses between multiple coaches.

In the sixth season, the "Block" was introduced, allowing a coach to prevent another coach from selecting an artist. It was removed the following season, but returned in season nine with a modification: it could only be used after the audition had ended, causing the blocked coach’s chair to turn towards the audience. In the tenth season, the "Block" was replaced by the "Ultimate Block", which prevents all other coaches from securing the artist.

The seventh season introduced the Comeback Stage, featuring Laura Tesoro as the original Comeback Coach. In this format, she selected eliminated artists from each round (up to the live shows) and mentored them through a separate competition. At the end of these rounds, selected artists were given the opportunity to re-enter the main competition as part of her team.

=== Knockouts ===
The Knockouts stage, first introduced in season 6 follows the Blind Auditions. During this round, coaches divide their artists into groups of three (in season 6) or pairs (from season 7 onward), with each contestant performing a solo song. After all performances, the coach selects one artist from each group to advance to the live shows.

Coaches can "steal" one artist eliminated from another team during the Knockouts.

==== Knockouts Redzone ====
In season 8, the Knockouts were dubbed to the "Knockouts Redzone". Instead of immediately eliminating artists, coaches could place contestants in the "Redzone". Each coach was permitted to place up to three artists in the Redzone, from which one contestant per team was selected to advance at the end of the round.

=== Battles ===
The battles follows usually follows the knockouts and serves as the final elimination round before the live shows. In this phase, each coach pairs two artists from their own team to perform a duet. After the performance, the coach selects one artist to advance to the next round, while the other is eliminated.

In the tenth season, the round was dubbed to Big Battles. In this variation, artists competed in larger group performances rather than traditional one-on-one duets. Coaches were required to evaluate multiple contestants at once and select a reduced number of artists to advance. Coaches can also send artists backstage and make their decision at the end of the round.

=== Cross Battles ===
From season nine onwards, the Knockouts were replaced by the Cross Battles and serves as the final elimination round before the live shows. Using the format similar to that used in the US version of the show in season 16. In this round, coaches select artists to compete head-to-head against contestants from other teams.

Each Cross-Battle features two artists performing individually, after which one is declared the winner and advances to the next stage. The winner is decided by a Flemish voting jury, which may include individuals from within or outside the music industry.

=== Live shows ===
In the final live performance phase of the competition, elimination rounds, artists perform in weekly shows, where public voting narrows to a final group of artists and eventually declares a winner.

== Coaches and hosts ==
=== Coaches ===
On 25 November 2011, VTM premiered the first season, featuring Koen Wauters, Natalia Druyts, Jasper Steverlinck, and Alex Callier as the original coaches. All four returned for the second season in 2013. On 14 August 2013, HLN announced that Regi Penxten and Bent Van Looy would join the show for the third season, replacing Callier and Steverlinck. On 11 September 2013, it was announced that Axelle Red would replace Druyts as a coach. Penxten and Red departed after one season, while Druyts returned and Bart Peeters joined as a new coach. Van Looy left after the fourth season and was replaced by Callier, who returned after a two-season hiatus. The four, Wauters, Druyts, Callier and Peeters, returned for the sixth season.

On October 6, 2019, HLN announced that Tourist LeMC would join the show, replacing Callier. On 5 November 2019, Qmusic announced that Niels Destadsbader would replace Bart Peeters, coaching alongside LeMC, Druyts and Wauters. The Voice Kids coach Laura Tesoro served as the fifth coach for the Comeback Stage. On 10 December, 2021, LeMC and Destadsbader's both were announced to leave the show, being replaced by Mathieu Terryn and Jan Paternoster, who join Wauters, Druyts and Tesoro. All five returned for the ninth season.

On 31 March 2025, it was announced that Druyts would leave the show after six seasons, stating that it was "time for a change". On 12 November 2025, Joost Klein was announced as a new coach for the tenth season, replacing Paternoster and joining Wauters, Terryn, and Tesoro, the latter becoming a main coach after previously serving as Comeback Stage coach. It was also confirmed that Maarten & Dorothee would replace Tesoro as coaches for the Comeback Stage.

=== Gallery ===
Coaches gallery

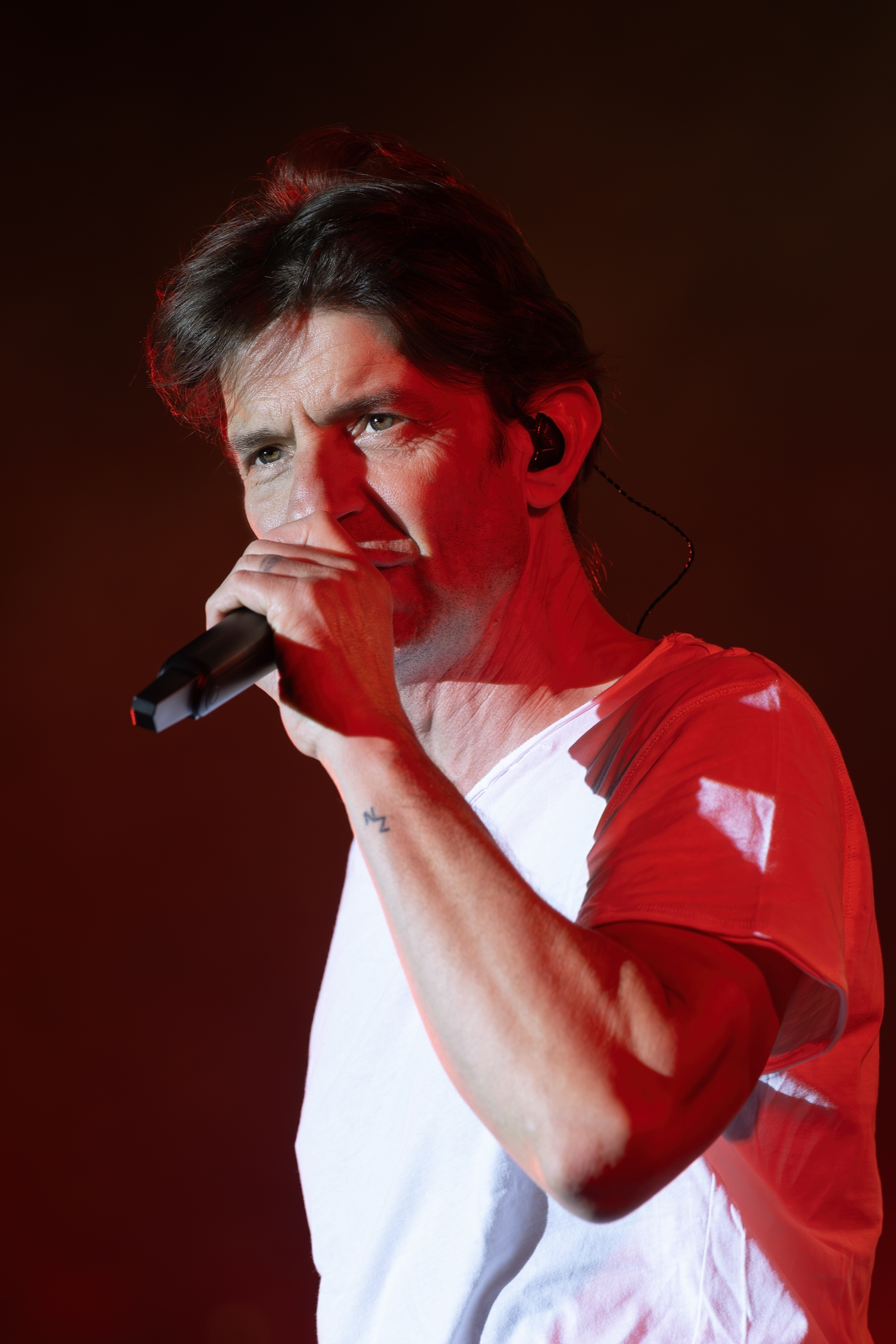
Koen Wauters (1–)

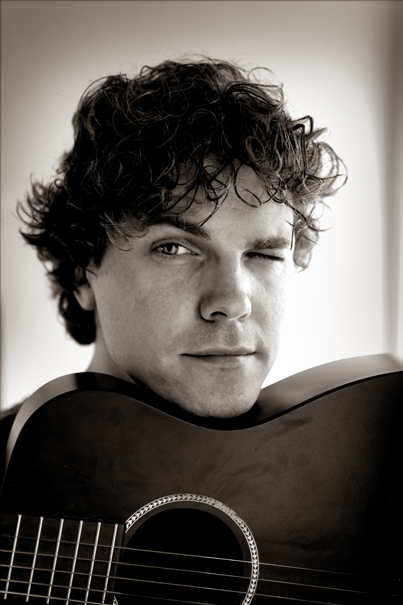
Jasper Steverlinck (1–2)

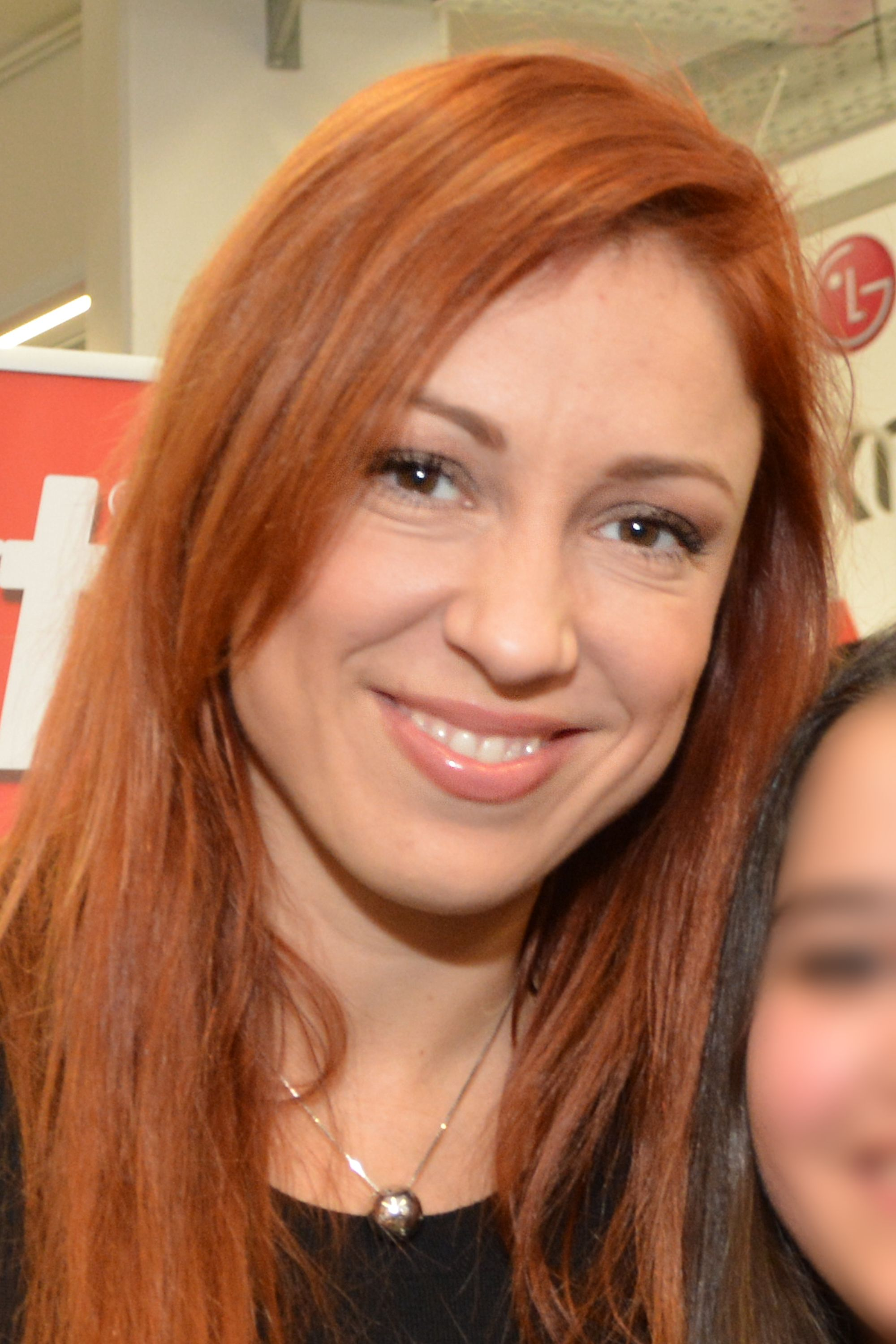
Natalia Druyts (1–2, 4–9)

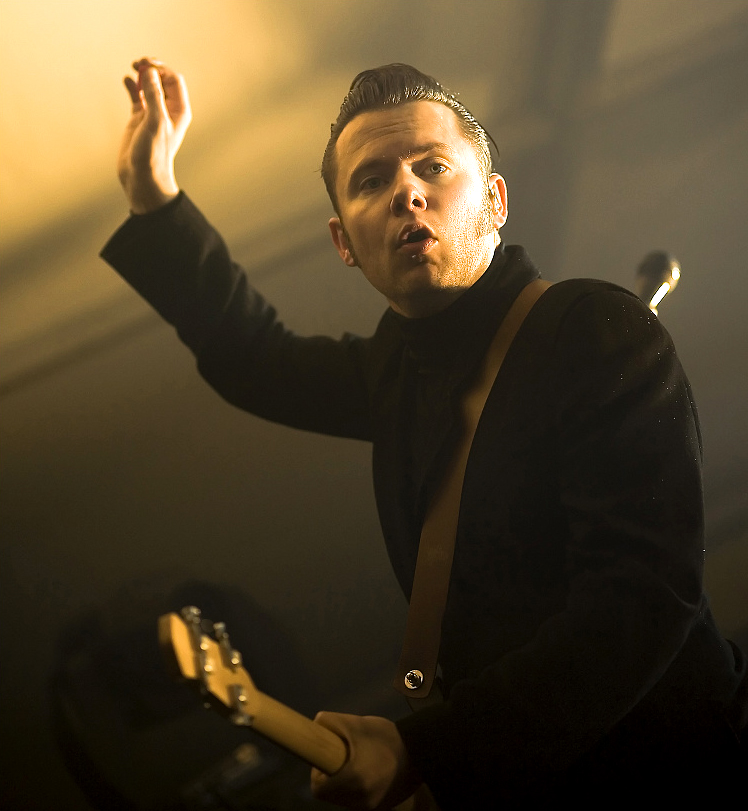
Alex Callier (1–2, 5–6)

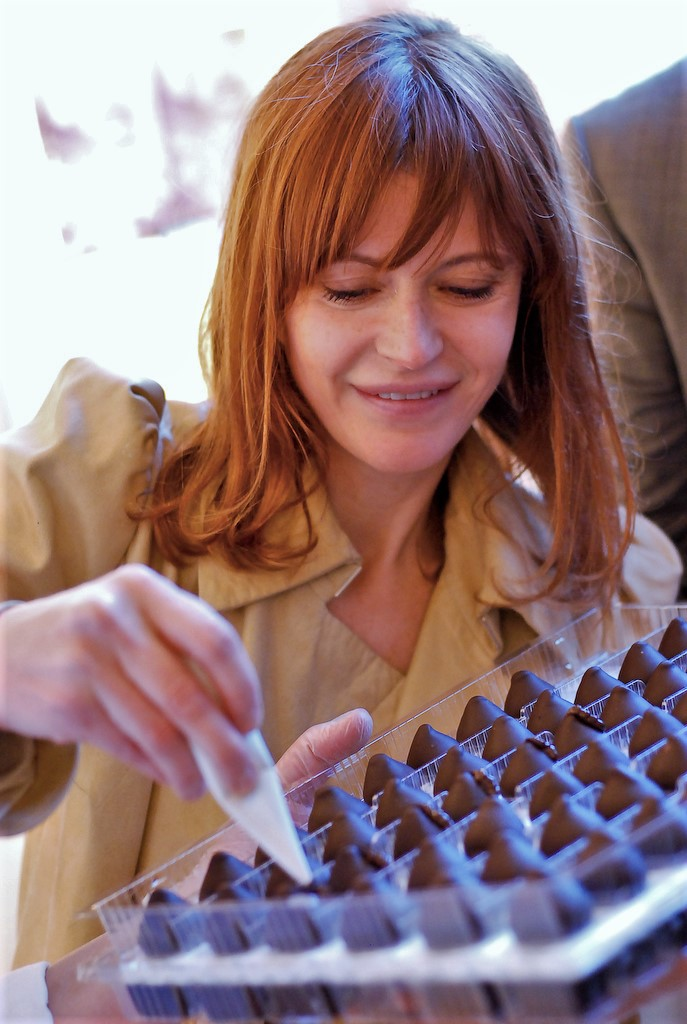
Axelle Red (3)

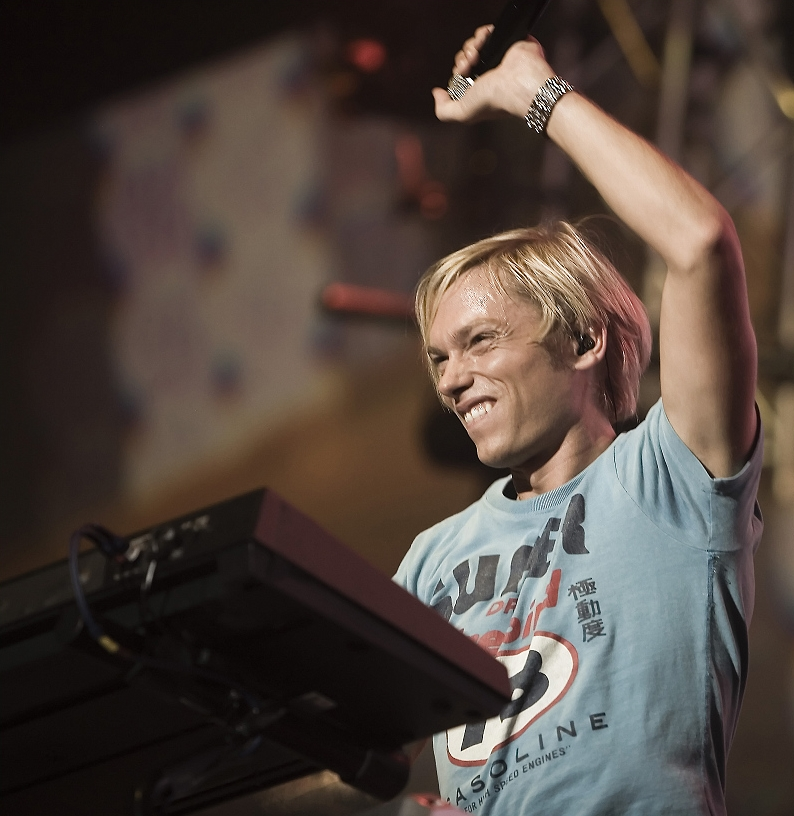
Regi Penxten (3)

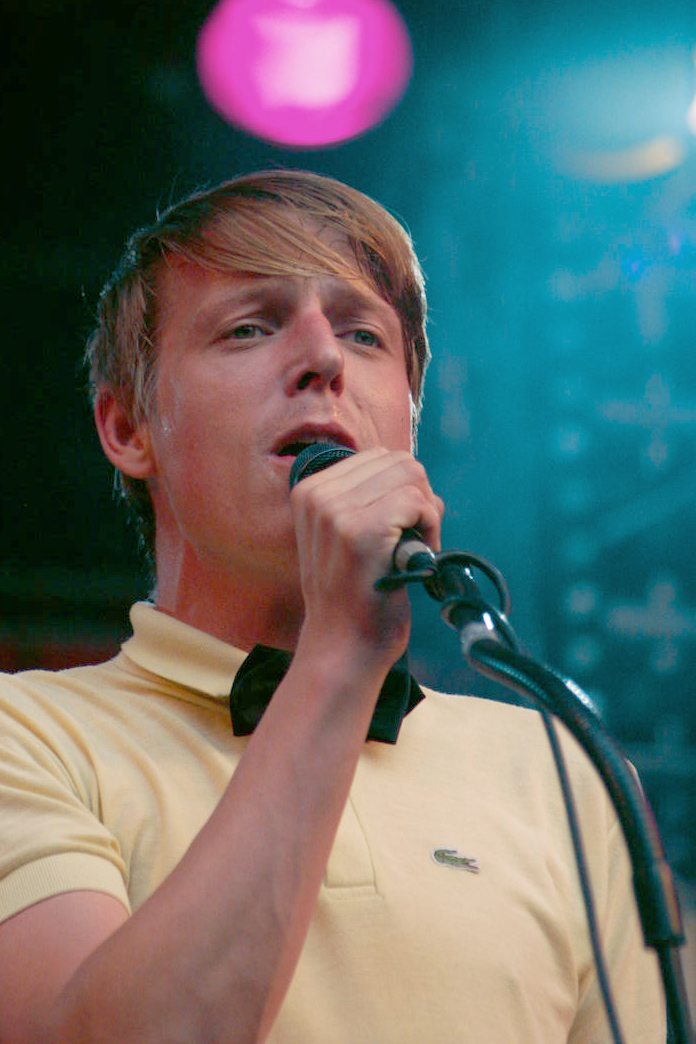
Bent Van Looy (3–4)

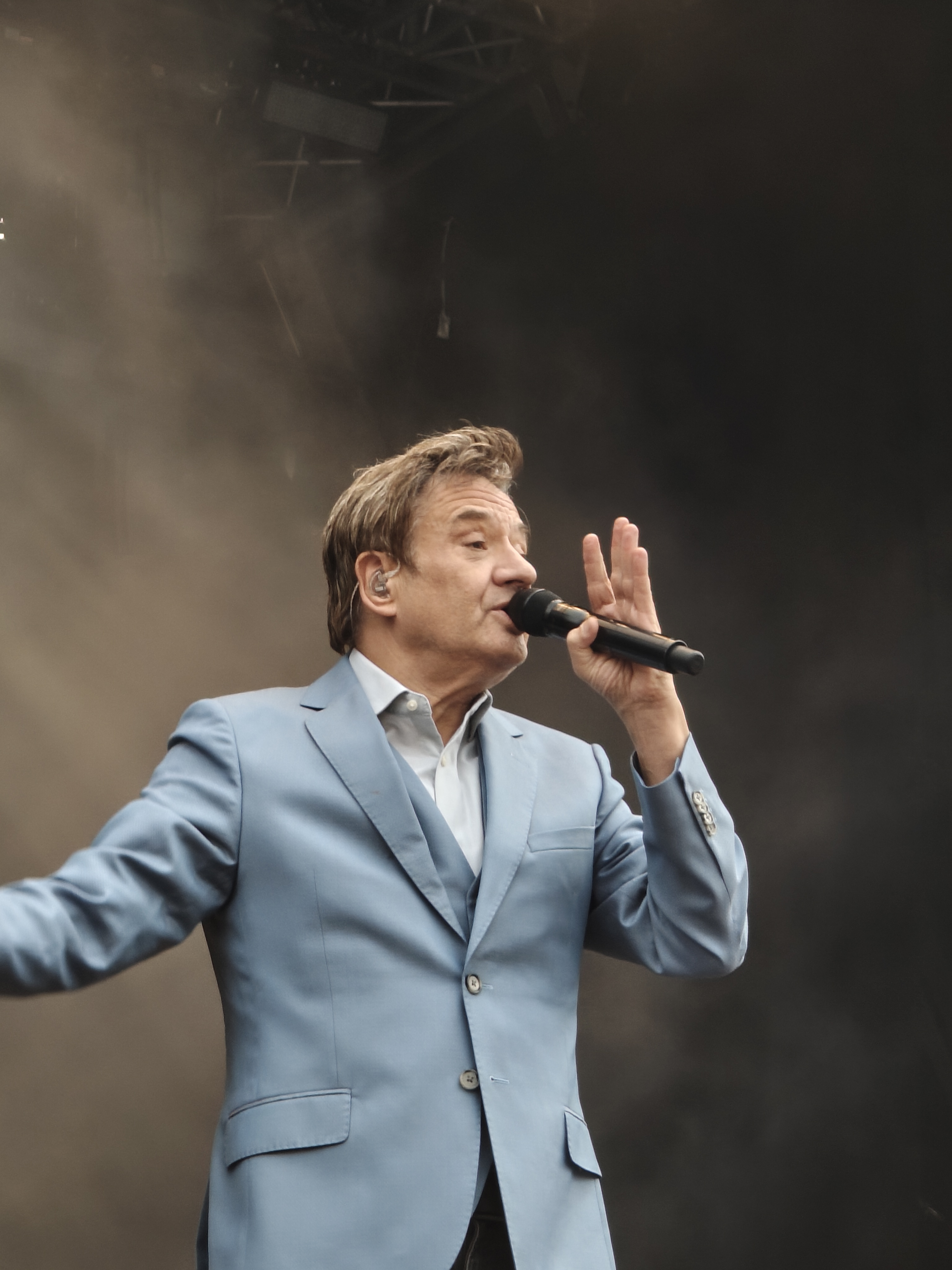
Bart Peeters (4–6)

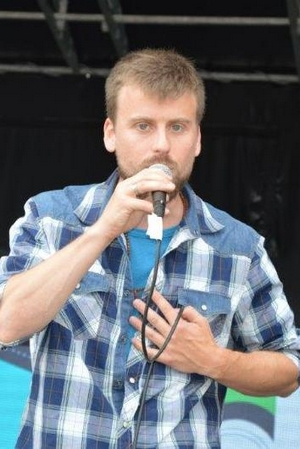
Tourist LeMC (7)

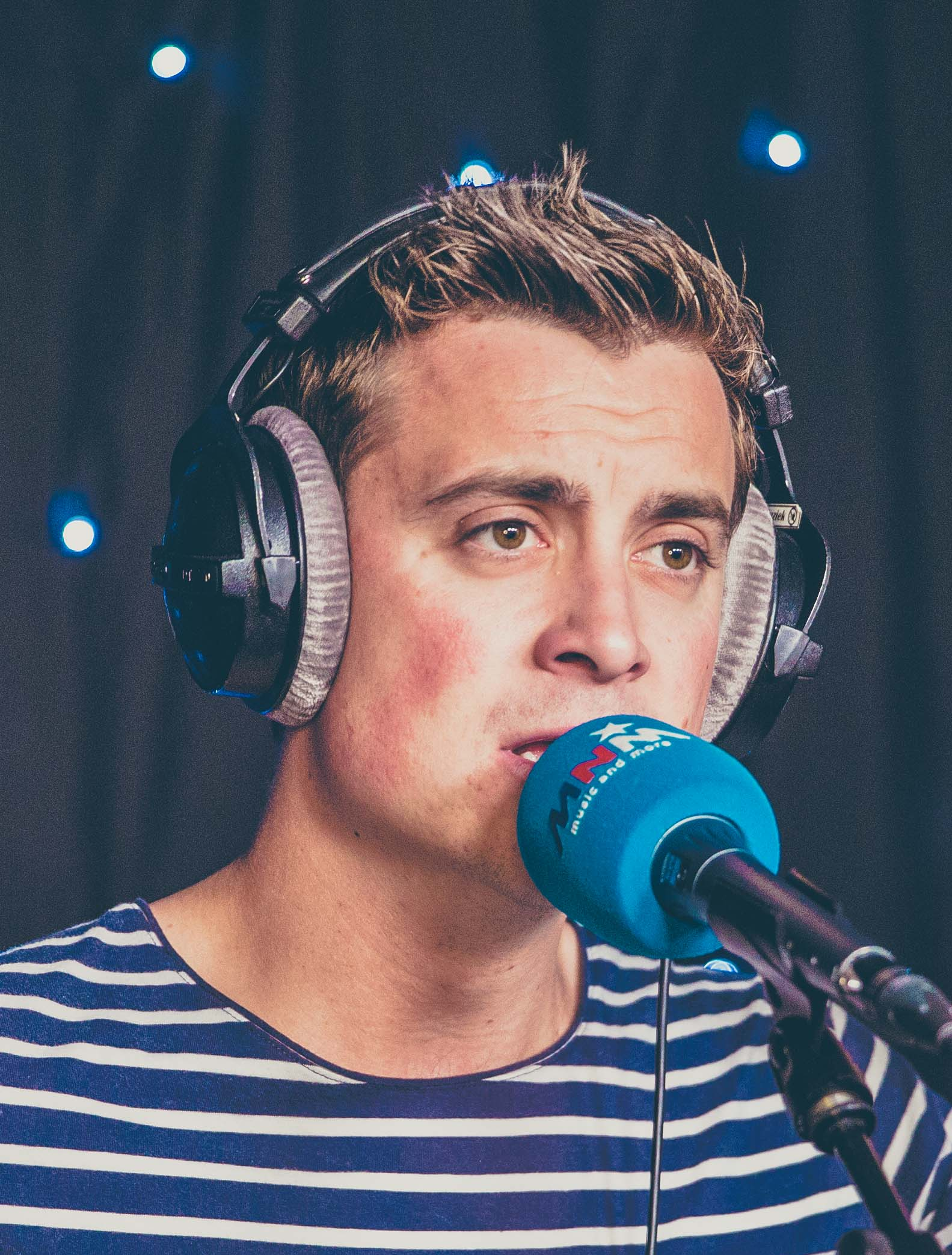
Niels Destadsbader (7)

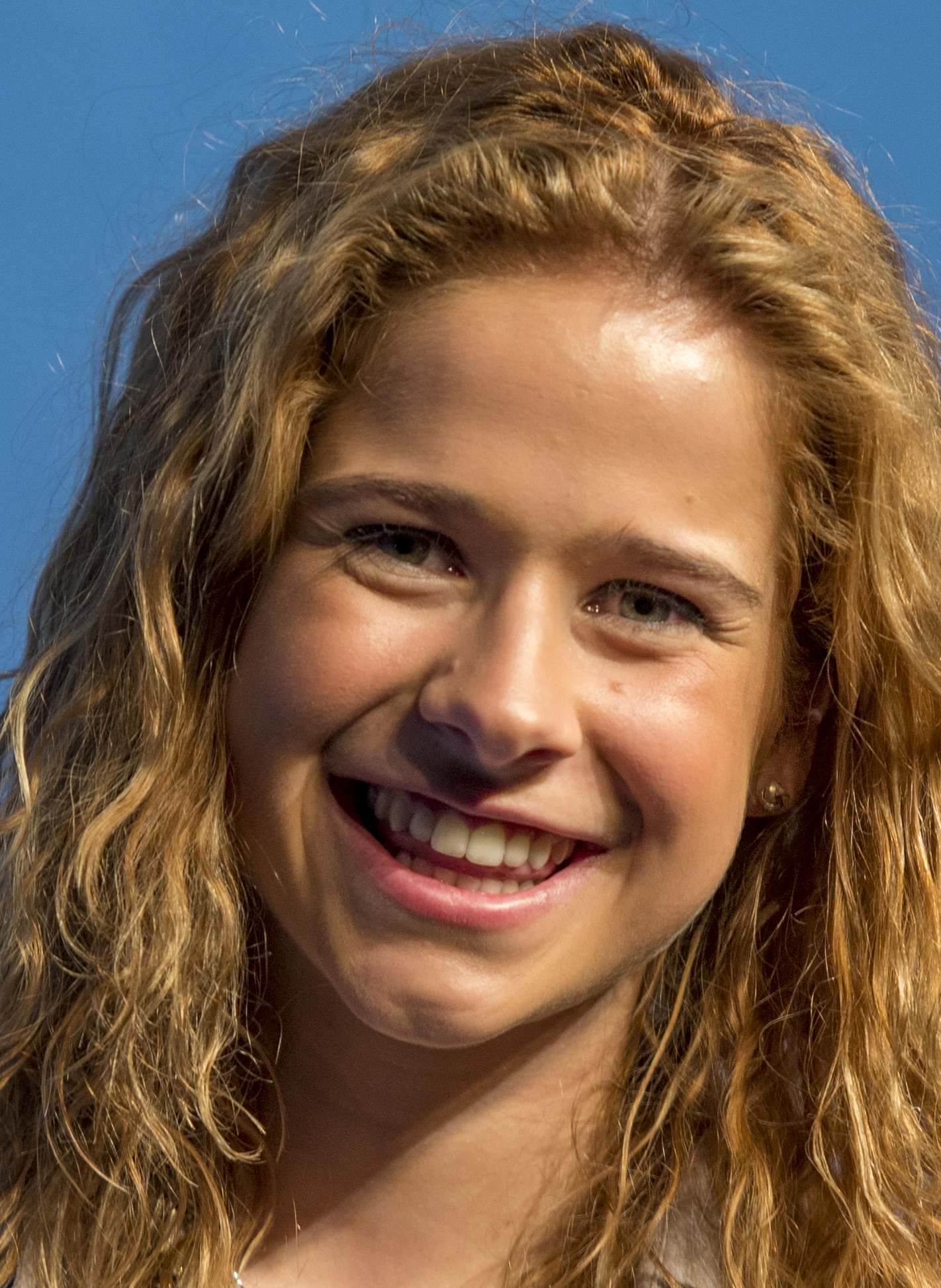
Laura Tesoro (Comeback Stage, 7–9; main 10–)

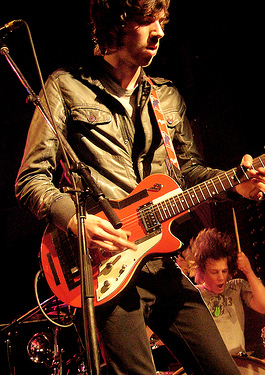
Jan Paternoster (8–9)

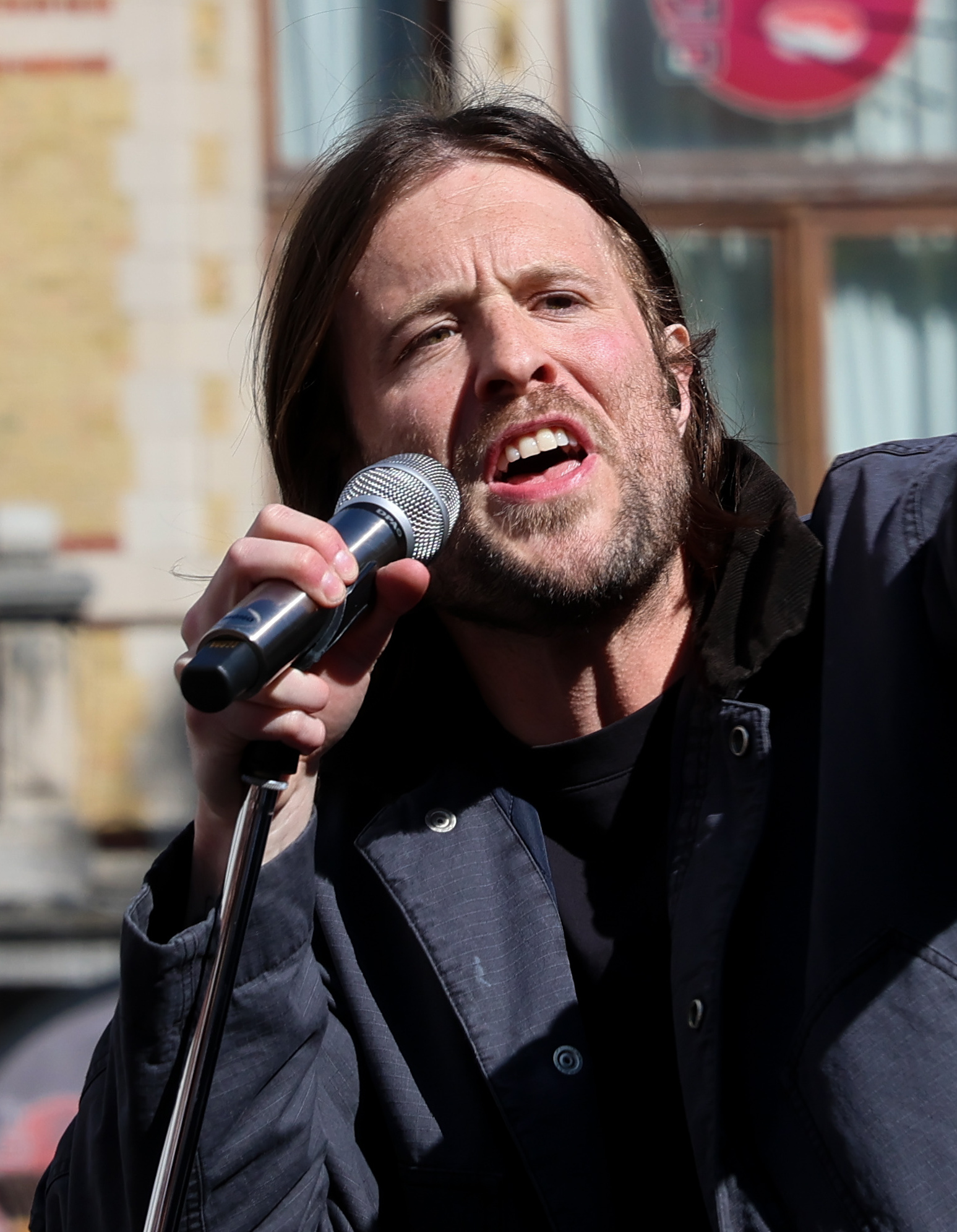
Mathieu Terryn (8–)

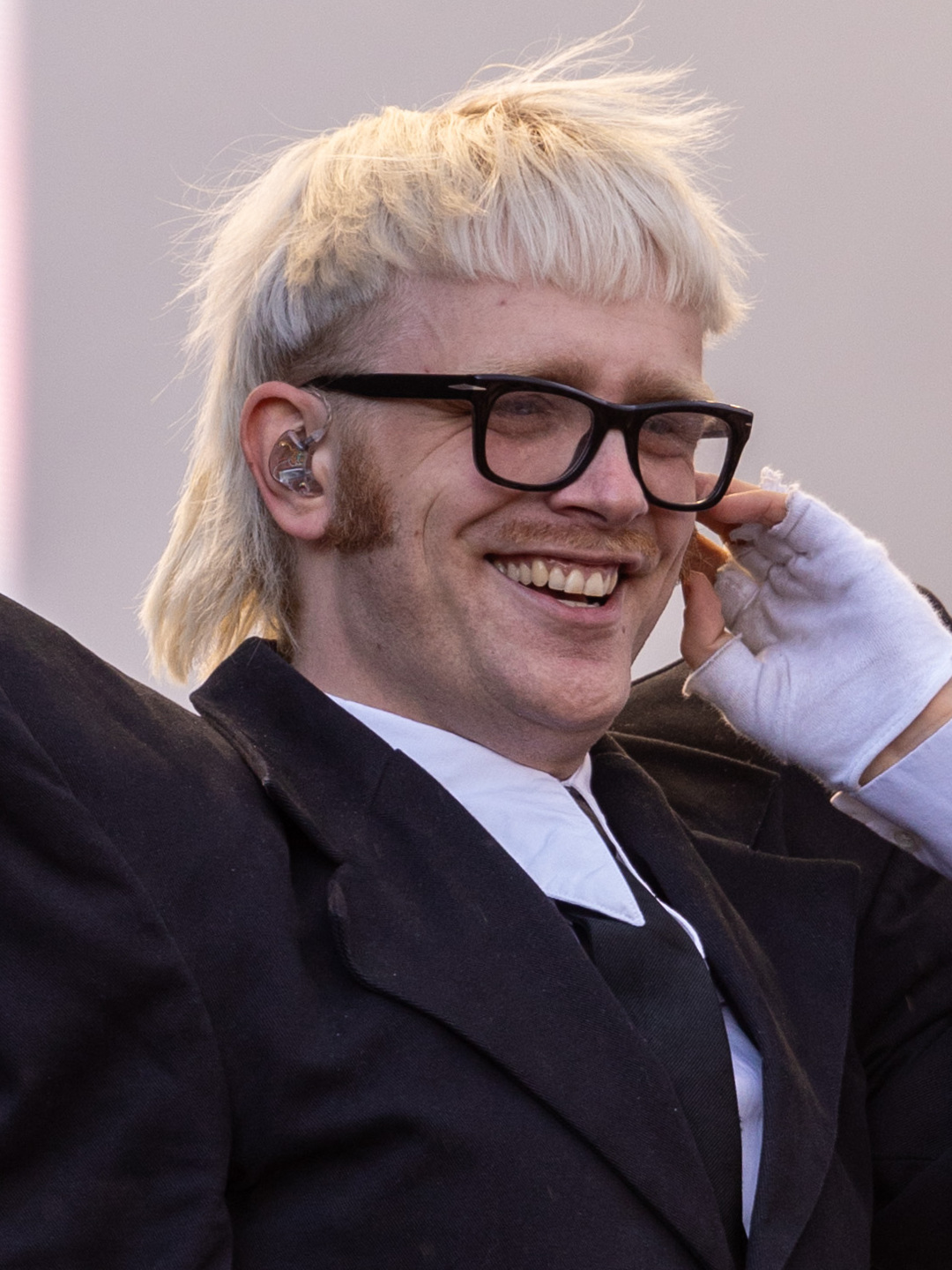
Joost Klein (10–)

=== Lineup of coaches ===
Coaches' line-up by chairs order
Season	Year	Coaches				
Season	Year	1	2	3	4	C.S.
1	2011	Jasper	Natalia	Koen	Alex	—N/a
2	2013	Alex	Natalia	Jasper	Koen	—N/a
3	2014	Regi	Koen	Axelle	Bent	—N/a
4	2016	Bent	Natalia	Bart	Koen	—N/a
5	2017	Koen	Alex	Natalia	Bart	—N/a
6	2019	Natalia	Bart	Koen	Alex	—N/a
7	2021	Niels	Natalia	Tourist	Koen	Laura
8	2022	Koen	Jan	Natalia	Mathieu	Laura
9	2024	Jan	Natalia	Mathieu	Koen	Laura
10	2026	Koen	Joost	Laura	Mathieu	Maarten & Dorothee

=== Timeline ===
The Voice van Vlaanderen coaches
Coach	Seasons									
Coach	1	2	3	4	5	6	7	8	9	10
Koen Wauters										
Natalia Druyts										
Alex Callier										
Jasper Steverlinck										
Regi Penxten										
Axelle Red										
Bent Van Looy										
Bart Peeters										
Tourist LeMC										
Niels Destadsbader										
Laura Tesoro (Note: Laura Tesoro was featured as "Comeback Stage" coach for seasons 7–9. In the live shows, she joined the other coaches on the main chairs. In season 10, she joined the panel as a main coach.)							C.S.			
Jan Paternoster										
Mathieu Terryn										
Joost Klein										
Maarten & Dorothee (Note: Maarten & Dorothee were featured as "Comeback Stage" coach for season 10. In the live shows, they joined the other coaches on the main chairs.)										C.S.

=== Hosts ===
The show has been hosted by An Lemmens and Sean Dhondt. In 2016, Dhondt was replaced by Sam De Bruyn. He left after one season, with Dhondt returning for the 2017 series. In 2022, Lemmens returned and Dhondt left with Aaron Blommaert replacing him. During the Knockouts and Battles, Gloria Monserez temporarily replaced Lemmens while she was on maternity leave. Both Blommaert and Monserez were later replaced by Aster Nzeyimana in 2024. Both Lemmens and Nzeyimana returned for the tenth season.

Colour key
Featured as a full-time host.
Featured as a part-time host.

The Voice van Vlaanderen hosts
Host	Seasons									
Host	1	2	3	4	5	6	7	8	9	10
An Lemmens										
Sean Dhondt										
Sam De Bruyn										
Aaron Blommaert										
Gloria Monserez										
Aster Nzeyimana										

Hosts gallery

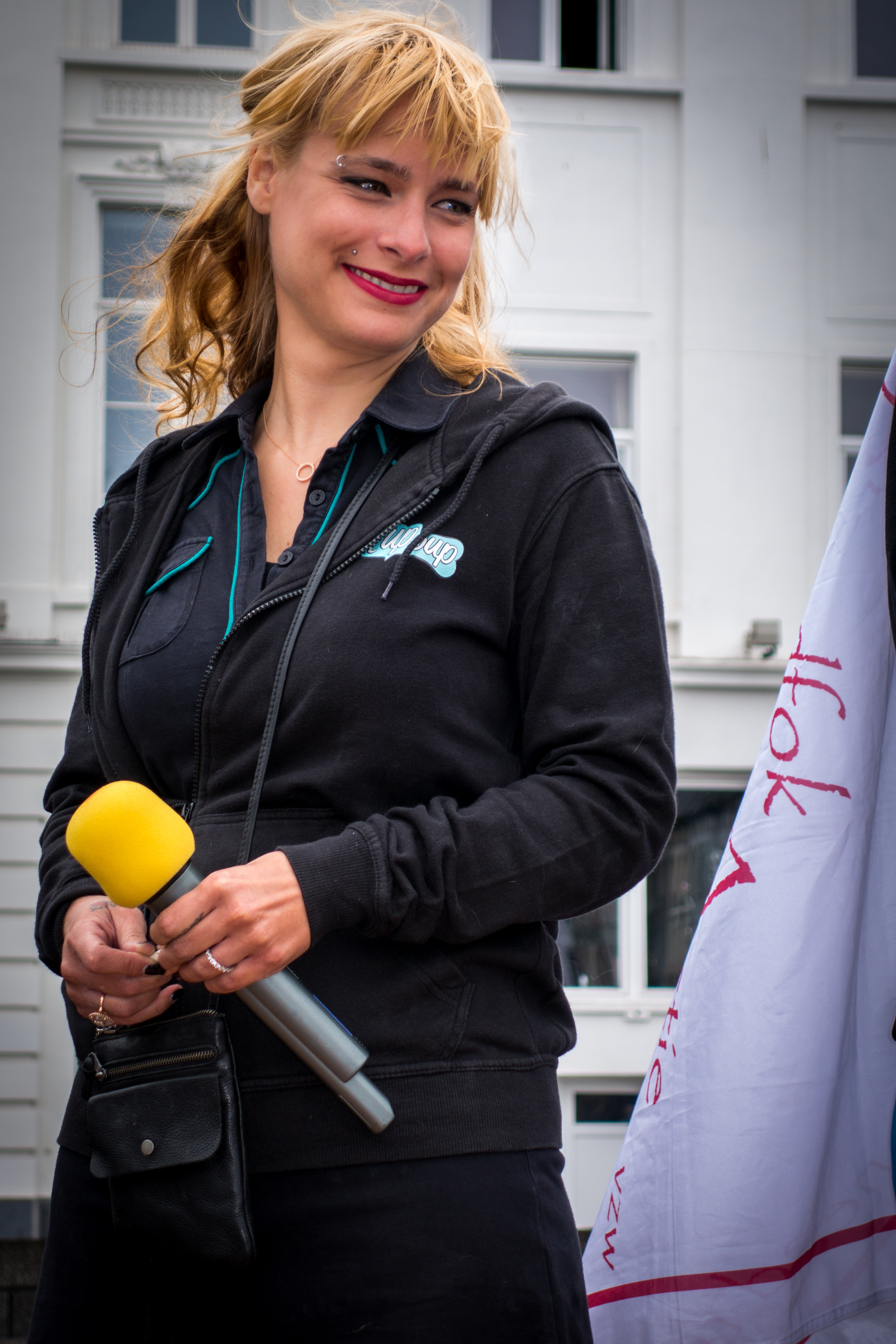
An Lemmens (1–)

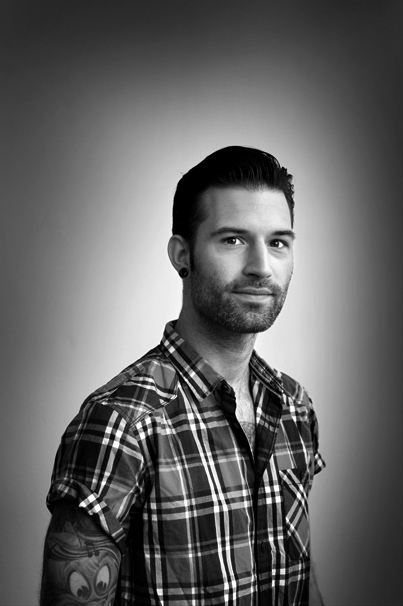
Sean Dhondt (1–3, 5–7)

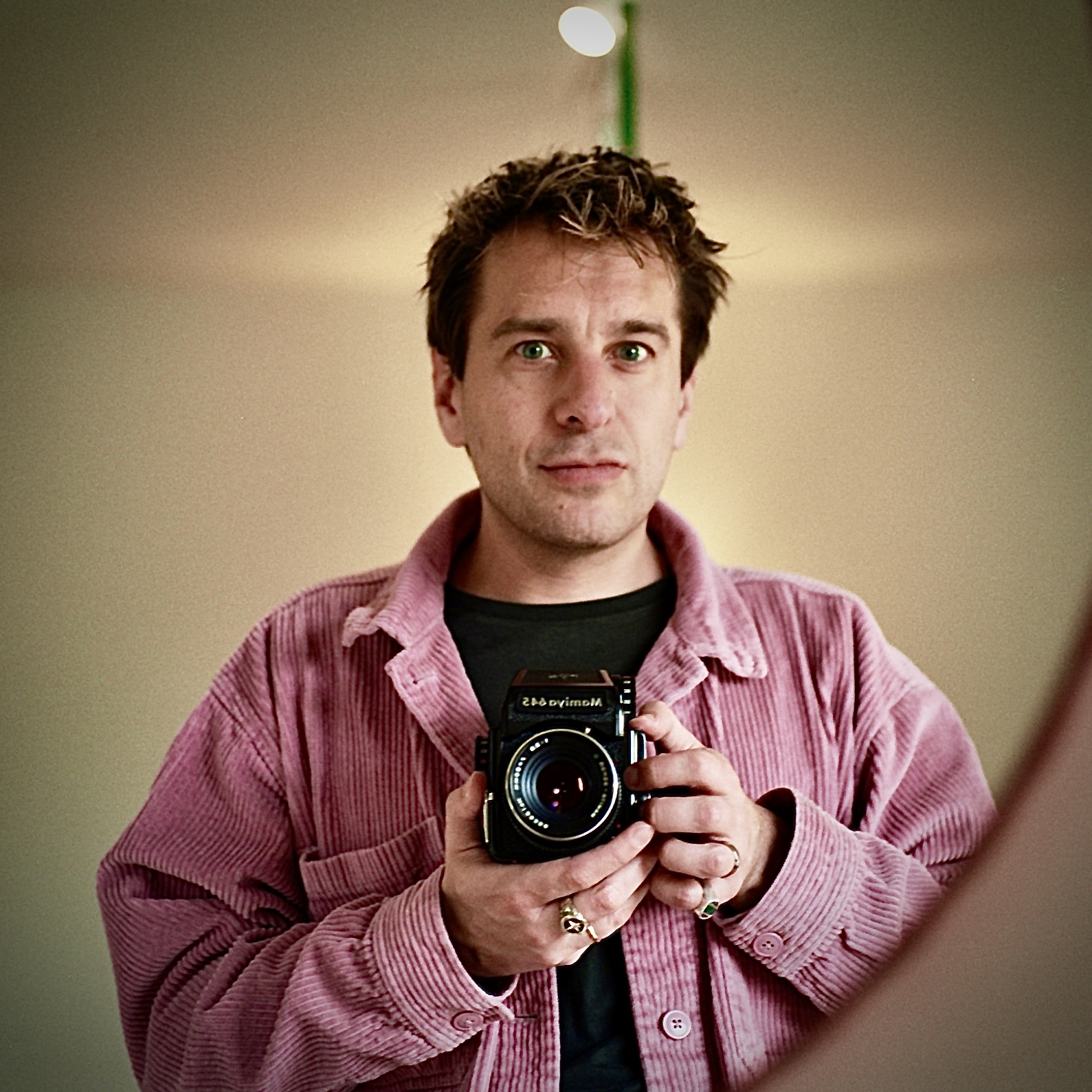
Sam De Bruyn (4)

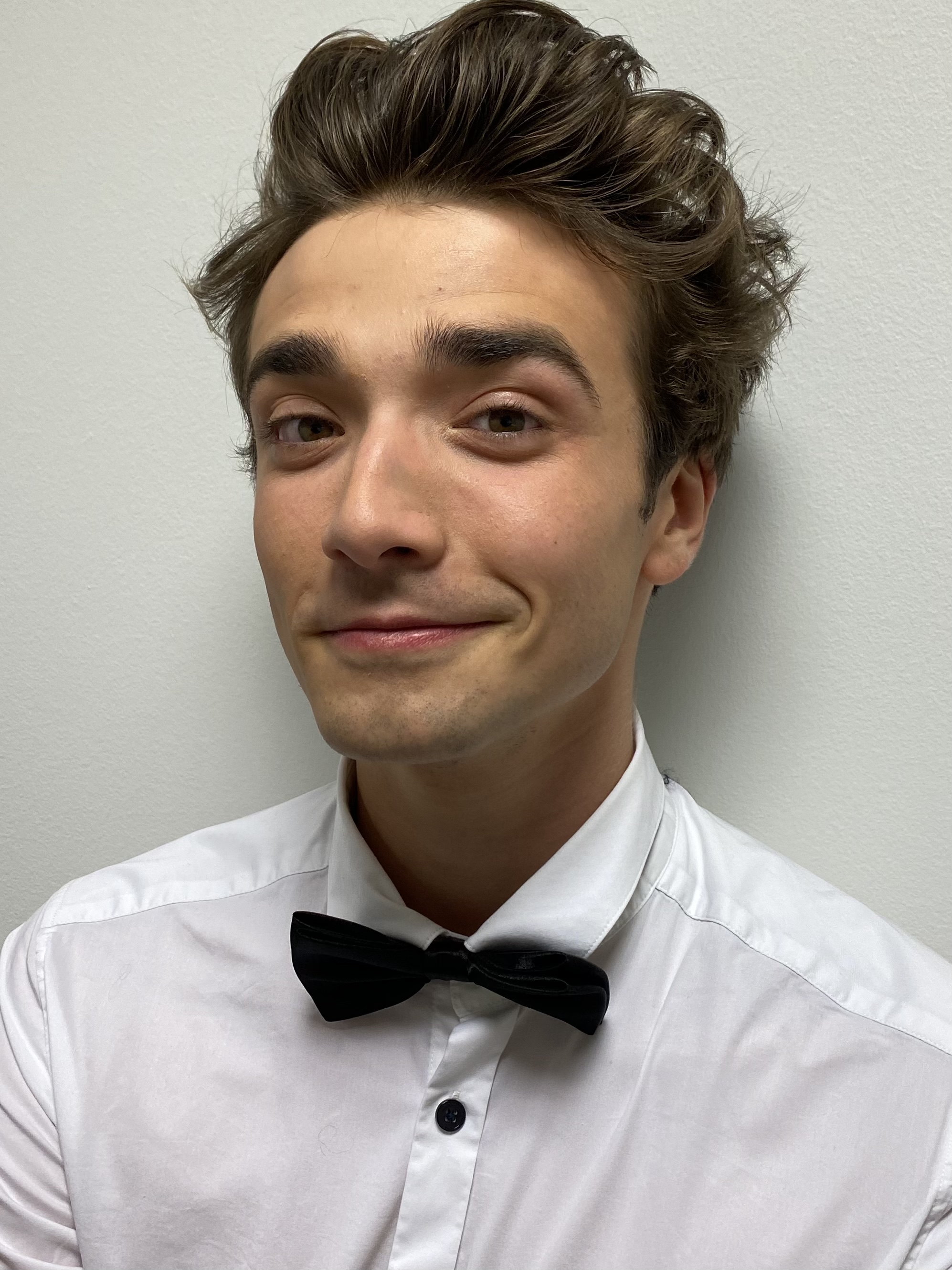
Aaron Blommaert (8)

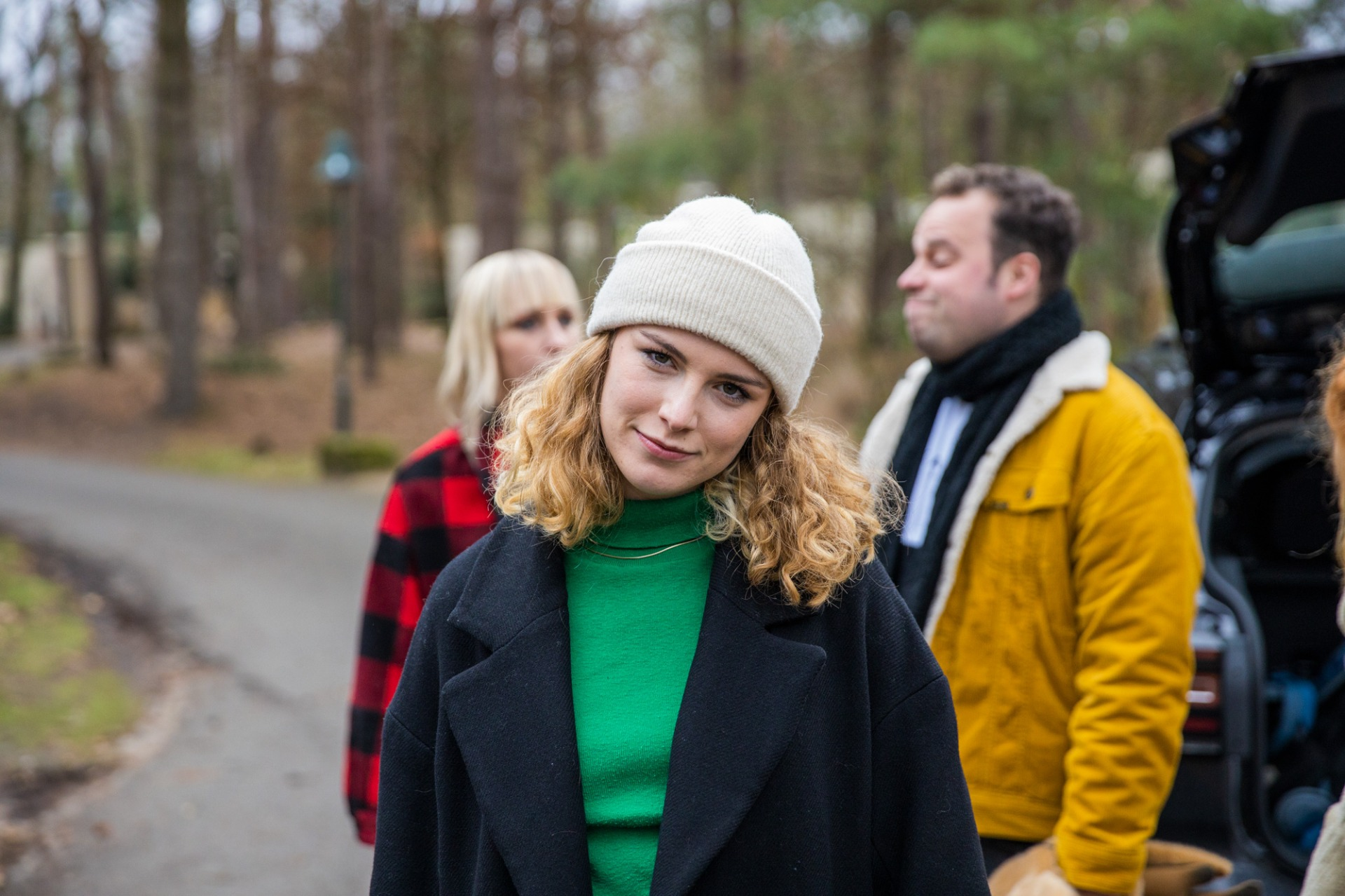
Gloria Monserez (8; battles & knockouts)

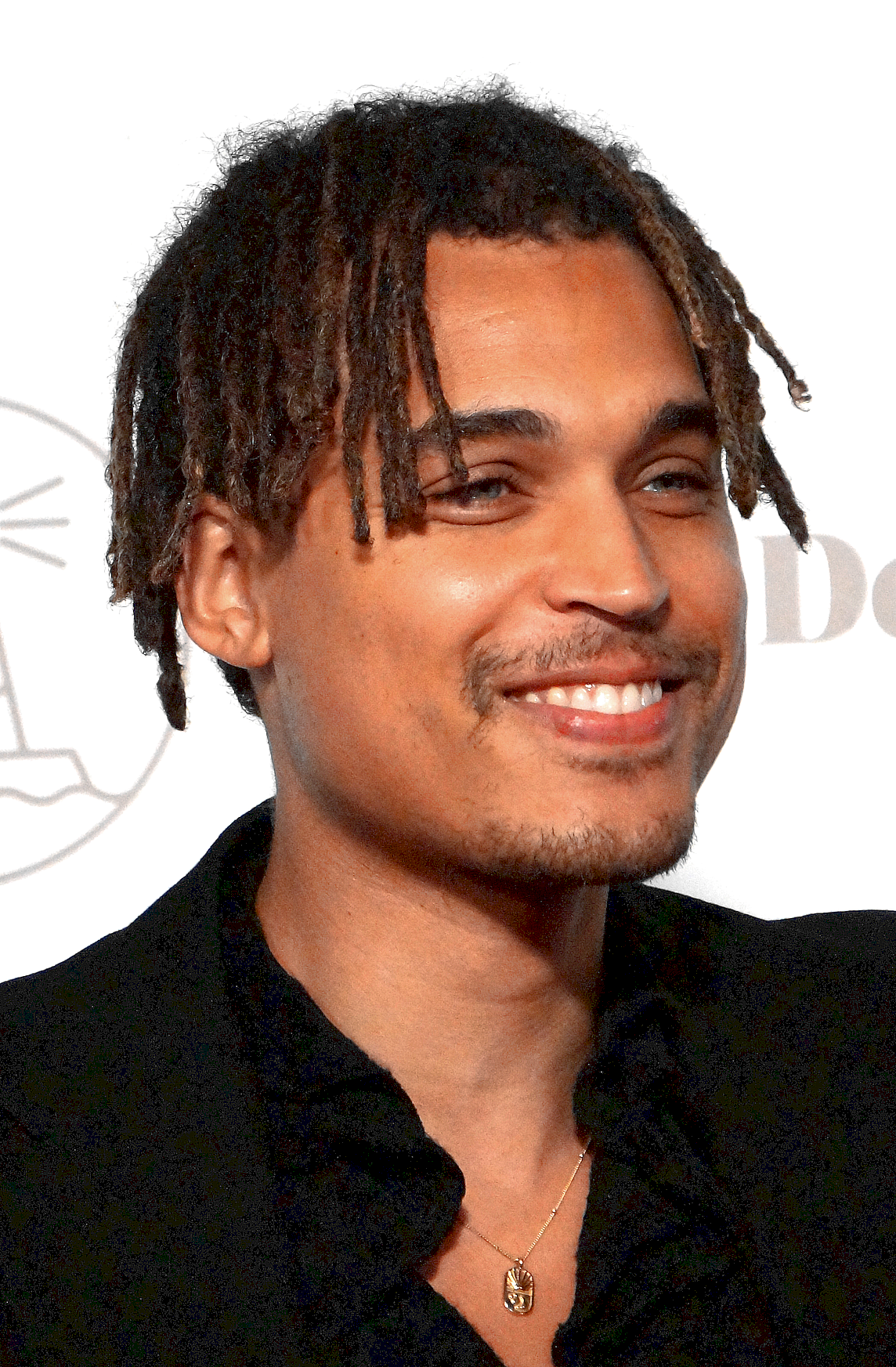
Aster Nzeyimana (9–)

== Coaches and finalists ==
Color key
Winner
Runner-up
Third place
Fourth place
Fifth place

- Warning: the following table presents a significant amount of different colors.
- Winners are in bold, the finalists in the finale are in italicized font, and the eliminated artists are in small font.

Season	Coaches and Artists				
1	Jasper Steverlinck	Natalia Druyts	Koen Wauters	Alex Callier	No fifth coach
1	**Glenn Claes**; Maxine Eeckeloo; Mayken Hoessen; De zusjes Vinken; Wim Vandenberghe; Charlotte Buyl	Silke Mastbooms; Yass Smaali; Ludovic Nyamabo; Kris Struyven & Harry Hendrickx; Axelle Aerts; Sarah Mulowayi	Bert Voordeckers; Stephanie Oclin; Dirk Cassiers; Pristice Yoka Mpela; Els De Martelaere; Eley Van Hemelrijck	Iris Van Straten; Joke Vincke; Eveline Billiau; Jodie Blommaert; Tanguy Van Dooren; Willem Storms	No fifth coach
2	**Paulien Mathues**; Matthijs Vanstaen; Domien Cnockaert; Sarah Godard; Lisa Castelli; Lori Eestermans; Eva & Elias Storme; Bert Van Renne	Robby Longo; Jana De Valck; Daniel López Montejo; Chris Medaer; Julie Barbé; Jens Oomes; Lucas Peeters; Bjorn & Joeri Rotthier	Theo Dewitte; Maria Theresa Morales; Eva Van Puyvelde; Niels Cockx; Els Artois; Patricia Lalomia; Freija D'Hondt; Jeroen Van Troyen	Olivier De Laet; Jaouad Alloul; Jelle Degens; Kaat Verschueren; Toni Verlinden; Arnd Van Vlierden; Lauren Zweegers; Kaat Verschueren; Timna Vanhecke	No fifth coach
3	Regi Penxten	Koen Wauters	Axelle Red	Bent Van Looy	No fifth coach
3	Dunja Mees; Cas Vandecruys; Jamilla Baidou; Johan Van Royen; Joke Herremy; Lisa Gilissen; Melanie De Saedeleer; Mikaël Ophoff	Laura Tesoro; Agnes De Raeve; Belinda De Bruyn; Eva De Geyter; Eva Hendriks; Lindsey De Bolster; Seppe De Rooij; Steph Van Uytvanck	Koen en Jo Smets; Aurélie Van Rompay; Dwayne Daeseleire; Emma Lauwers; Jessica Ndimubandi; Laure Mot; Peter Boone; Steven Van den Panhuyzen	**Tom De Man**; Camille Van Wambeke; Chloé Ditlefsen; Cristina Sapalo; Demi Eestermans; Elie De Prijcker; Jolan Standaert; Mandy Nijssen	No fifth coach
4	Bent Van Looy	Natalia Druyts	Bart Peeters	Koen Wauters	No fifth coach
4	Gilles Muylle; Sophie Speck; Janna Salhoume; Laura Martens; Jens De Laet; Olivia Trappeniers; Jolan Renson; Shauni Rau	Jimmy Colman; Camille Ooghe; David Maliyamungu; Kim Leyers; Julie Daems; Yael Adikou; Jessie Thijs; Naomy Laure	Jan Van De Ven; Robin Desmet; Lisa Van Rossem; Yana De Saedeleer; Lina Lahbiri; Sigi Hendrix; Gergana Velikova; Nick Rosseel	**Lola Obasuyi**; Leen Verstraete; Sandra Bakuku; Sepp Hendrix; Kjell Baghein; Nicola De Cock; Simon Vaernewyck; Sofia Anessiadis	No fifth coach
5	Koen Wauters	Alex Callier	Natalia Druyts	Bart Peeters	No fifth coach
5	Bonni Van Ounsen; Amber Dhert; Mike Wolfs; Lisa Okoh; Melanie Mertens-Polak; Tom Verhaeghe; Jérémie Vrielynck; Magalie Van Rompay	**Luka Cruysberghs**; Dieter Guldemont; Louis De Roo; Cherine Mroue; Joséphine Rioda; Xavier Bascho-George; Jessica Fernandes Amorim; Joyce Vanderhoydonck	Bert Lievens; Sima Heyrati; Nelson Pereira; Sitse Brems; Jolyne Vanquaethoven; Tomisin Temidara; Adele Monheim; Idriss Ly	Dries De Vleminck; Yoeri Mellaerts; Sebastiaan Carron; Jan Hulsmans; Nabil Khemir; Robin Dhoore; Ellen Van Gool; Guillaume Vangu	No fifth coach
6	**Ibe Wuyts**; Wannes Lacroix; Rune Van Den Notenlaer	Margarita Spirina; Christophe Leenknecht; Charlotte Nuytkens	Fee Loobuyck; Jazz-Lynn Vanhemelrijck; Miroslav Gabor	Bram De Mets; Petra Hessing; Karim Lequenne	No fifth coach
7	Niels Destadsbader	Natalia Druyts	Tourist LeMC	Koen Wauters	Laura Tesoro
7	Nanou Nys; Tobe Vandekerckhove; Sinay Bavurhe	**Grace Khuabi**; Simon Van Cant; Annelies Fraeye	Ilias Addi; Nisrine Rabhioui Simon; Thomas Vankriekelsvenne	Robin Crauwels; Joke Verhulst; Jill Van Vooren	Edison Sahiti; Mats Tuerlinckx; Yvette Boatemaa
8	Koen Wauters	Jan Paternoster	Natalia Druyts	Mathieu Terryn	Laura Tesoro
8	Johan Callaers; Rosann Kerckhaert; Louise Desmet	Wesley Ngoto; Marilou Caudron; Ilaria Coppens	**Louise Goedefroy**; Ruben Katshiame; Julót Van Der Pol	Evert Dirckx; Yente De Saedeleer; Kaat Neefs	Néhémie Katshiame; Tessa Cornelis; Ashley Feytons
9
9	Kobe Simoens; Peter Steyaert; Wout Eggermont	Xerxes Wouters; Kevin Heye	Sandy Meeus; Selina Baron	Laurens Maes; Mette-Marie Maes; Liene Cuyx; Marthe De Leeneer; Paak Kormongkolkul	**Christophe Verholle**; Lucas Geldof; Nicole Verbraeken
10	Koen Wauters	Joost Klein	Laura Tesoro	Mathieu Terryn	Maarten & Dorothee
10	**Bas Serra**	Maëlle Moquet; Rebecca Haffner; Silke Hamers; Sea Munyaneza; Maarten Persoons	Joris Roosen; Hafsa Senhadji; Aïcha Bangura	Naz Cavusoglu; Mike de Bock; Karry	Finn van Damme; Timon Jansegers; Amélie Rollé

== Series overview ==
Teams colour key
Artist from Team Koen	Artist from Team Regi	Artist from Team Mathieu
Artist from Team Natalia	Artist from Team Bent	Artist from Team Laura
Artist from Team Alex	Artist from Team Bart	Artist from Team Joost
Artist from Team Jasper	Artist from Team Niels	Artist from Team Maarten & Dorothee
Artist from Team Axelle	Artist from Team Jan

The Voice van Vlaanderen series overview
Season	Aired	Winner	Runner-up	Third place	Fourth place	Fifth place	Winning coach	Presenter(s)
1	2011–2012	Glenn Claes	Silke Mastbooms	Iris Van Straten	Bert Voordeckers	—N/a	Jasper Steverlinck	An Lemmens, Sean Dhondt
2	2013	Paulien Mathues	Robby Longo	Theo Dewitte	Olivier De Laet	—N/a	Jasper Steverlinck	An Lemmens, Sean Dhondt
3	2014	Tom De Man	Laura Tesoro	Koen en Jo Smets	Dunja Mees	—N/a	Bent Van Looy	An Lemmens, Sean Dhondt
4	2016	Lola Obasuyi	Jan Van De Ven	Gilles Muylle	Jimmy Colman	—N/a	Koen Wauters	Lemmens, Sam De Bruyn
5	2017	Luka Cruysberghs	Dries De Vleminck	Bert Lievens	Bonni Van Ounsen	—N/a	Alex Callier	Lemmens, Dhondt
6	2019	Ibe Wuyts	Wannes Lacroix	Bram De Mets	Fee Loobuyck	—N/a	Koen Wauters	Lemmens, Dhondt
7	2021	Grace Khuabi	Robin Crauwels	Simon Van Cant	Joke Verhulst	Nanou Nys	Natalia Druyts	Lemmens, Dhondt
8	2022	Louise Goedefroy	Johan Callaers	Evert Dirckx	Wesley Ngoto	Yente De Saedeleer	Natalia Druyts	Lemmens, Aaron Blommaert, Gloria Monserez
9	2024	Christophe Verholle	Kobe Simoens	Lucas Geldof	Laurens Maes	—N/a	Laura Tesoro	Lemmens, Aster Nzeyimana
10	2026	Bas Serra	Maëlle Moquet	Joris Roosen	Finn van Damme	—N/a	Koen Wauters	Lemmens, Aster Nzeyimana

=== Season 1 (2011–2012) ===
The first season of The Voice van Vlaanderen aired from 25 November 2011 to 17 March 2012. An Lemmens was the main presenter, while Sean Dhondt co-hosted during the live shows. The coaches were a Belgian singer and television presenter, Koen Wauters; pop singer Natalia Druyts; musician and producer and member of Hooverphonic, Alex Callier; and rock vocalist and frontman of Arid, Jasper Steverlinck. At the conclusion of the season, Glenn Claes from Team Jasper was named the winner.

=== Season 2 (2013) ===
The second season premiered on 18 January and concluded on 3 May 2013. Both presenters and all four coaches returned from the previous season. Paulien Mathues from Team Jasper won the season.

=== Season 3 (2014) ===
The third season aired from 7 February to 23 May 2014. The season was again presented by An Lemmens and Sean Dhondt. The coaches were Koen Wauters, Regi Penxten, Bent Van Looy, and Axelle Red. Tom De Man was the winner of the season, representing Team Bent.

The runner-up, Laura Tesoro, later participated in the Eurovision Song Contest 2016 with the song "What's the Pressure", finishing tenth with 181 points.

=== Season 4 (2016) ===
The fourth season aired from 19 February to 3 June 2016. Sean Dhondt did not return and was replaced by Sam De Bruyn, who presented alongside An Lemmens. The coaches were Koen Wauters, Bent Van Looy, Natalia Druyts, and new coach Bart Peeters. The winner was Lola Obasuyi from Team Koen.

=== Season 5 (2017) ===
The fifth season aired from 8 September to 15 December 2017. Sam De Bruyn left the show and Sean Dhondt returned as co-presenter alongside An Lemmens. Koen Wauters, Bart Peeters, and Natalia Druyts returned, while Alex Callier replaced Bent Van Looy. Luka Cruysberghs from Team Alex won the season.

=== Season 6 (2019) ===
The sixth season aired from 8 February to 31 March 2019. Both presenters and all four coaches from the previous season returned. Ibe Wuyts from Team Koen won the season.

=== Season 7 (2021) ===
The seventh season aired from 5 February to 28 May 2021. The presenters returned from the previous season. Koen Wauters and Natalia Druyts returned as coaches, joined by new coaches Tourist LeMC and Niels Destadsbader. Additionally, season 3 runner-up and The Voice Kids coach Laura Tesoro served as the fifth coach for the Comeback Stage. Grace Khuabi from Team Natalia won the season.

=== Season 8 (2022) ===
The eighth season aired from 30 September to 23 December 2022. An Lemmens returned as presenter, while Sean Dhondt was replaced by Aaron Blommaert. During the Knockouts and Battles, Lemmens was on maternity leave and was temporarily replaced by Gloria Monserez before returning for the live shows. The coaches were Koen Wauters, Natalia Druyts, and returning Comeback coach Laura Tesoro, joined by new coaches Mathieu Terryn and Jan Paternoster. Louise Goedefroy from Team Natalia won the season.

=== Season 9 (2024) ===
VTM originally did not renew the show for a ninth season. The ninth season aired from 26 January to 26 April 2024. Aster Nzeyimana replaced Aaron Blommaert and Gloria Monserez as presenter alongside An Lemmens. All five coaches returned from the previous season. Christophe Verholle from Team Laura won the season.

=== Season 10 (2026) ===
The tenth season premiered on 13 February 2026. The presenters returned from the previous season. Joost Klein joined as a new coach, replacing Jan Paternoster. Laura Tesoro became a main coach, while Maarten & Dorothee became the new Comeback Stage coaches. Mathieu Terryn and Koen Wauters returned. Bas Serra from Team Koen won the season.
