= Truthfulness =

Truthfulness may refer to:

- Honesty—a moral character of a human being, related to telling the truth
- Accuracy—the propensity of information to be correct
- Incentive compatibility—a property of some strategic games that encourages participants to be honest about their preferences

See also:

- Truth - a concept most often used to mean in accord with fact or reality.
- Truthiness - a quality characterizing a "truth" that a person making an argument or assertion claims to know intuitively.
- Truthlikeness - a philosophical concept that distinguishes between the relative and apparent truth and falsity of assertions and hypotheses.

== See also ==
- Truth (disambiguation)
- Truthfully (disambiguation)
- Truly (disambiguation)
