= Eternally Yours =

Eternally Yours may refer to:

- Eternally Yours (film), a 1939 American film directed by Tay Garnett
- Eternally Yours, a 2006 short film by Atsushi Ogata
- Eternally Yours (album), by the Saints, 1978
- "Eternally Yours" (song), by 2 Unlimited, 1991
- Eternally Yours (TV series), an American sitcom
- "Eternally Yours", a form of valediction at the end of written correspondence
- "Eternally Yours" a song by American metalcore band Motionless in White

== See also ==
- Eternamente tuya (lit. Eternally Yours), a 2009 Mexican telenovela
- Forever Yours (disambiguation)
- Eternally (disambiguation)
- Yours (disambiguation)
