= Paulien =

Paulien is a Dutch feminine given name cognate to Pauline. People with the name include:

- Paulien Cornelisse (born 1976), Dutch writer, columnist and cabaret performer
- Paulien van Deutekom (1981–2019), Dutch speed skater
- Paulien van Dooremalen (born 1985) Dutch badminton player
- Paulien Hogeweg (born 1943), Dutch theoretical biologist
- Paulien Mathues (born 1994), Flemish singer
- Paulien van Schaik (born 1967), Dutch jazz singer and composer

== See also ==
- Jon Paulien (born 1949), a Seventh-day Adventist theologian
- Pauliena Rooijakkers (born 1993), Dutch road cyclist
- Saint-Paulien. a commune in south-central France
