= Truly =

Truly may refer to:

== Music ==
- Truly (band), an American rock band
- "Truly" (Lionel Richie song), a debut song by Lionel Richie
- "Truly" (Delerium song), a song by Delerium
- Truly: The Love Songs, a 1997 compilation album by Lionel Richie
- "Truly", a song by Cigarettes After Sex from their self-titled album
- Truly, an album by Melanie Amaro

== People ==
- Jeff Truly (1861–1946), Mississippi legislator and judge
- Richard H. Truly (1937–2024), U.S. Navy vice admiral and NASA administrator
- Truly Shattuck (1875–1954), American vaudeville performer and actress

== Other uses ==
- Truly (brand), a hard seltzer and vodka brand
- "Truly", a valediction in written correspondence

== See also ==
- Yours truly (disambiguation)
- Truthfully (disambiguation)
- Truthfulness (disambiguation)
