= Sincerely =

Sincerely may refer to:

- Sincerity, the virtue of speaking truly about one's feelings, thoughts, desires

== Music ==
- Sincerely (Cliff Richard album), 1969
- Sincerely (Dwight Twilley Band album) or the title song, 1976
- Sincerely (The Emotions album) or the title song, 1984
- Sincerely (The Forester Sisters album), 1988
- Sincerely (Mari Hamada album)
- Sincerely (Melody album) or the title song, 2004
- Sincerely (Stephen album) or the title song, 2016
- Sincerely (Kali Uchis album), 2025
- Sincerely, an album by the Clark Sisters, 1982
- Sincerely, an album by Deb Talan, 2001
- Sincerely, an album by End of a Year, 2006
- "Sincerely" (song), a song written by Harvey Fuqua and Alan Freed, 1954
- "Sincerely", a song by Nessa Barrett from Pretty Poison
- "Sincerely", a song by YoungBoy Never Broke Again from Sincerely, Kentrell

== Other uses ==
- "Sincerely", a valediction in written correspondence

== See also ==
- Sincerely Yours (disambiguation)
- Yours Sincerely (disambiguation)
