= The Voice van Vlaanderen season 3 =

The Voice van Vlaanderen is a Belgian reality talent show. The third season of the Flemish version premiered on 7 February 2014 on the vtm television network. The season's finale was on 23 May 2014

Only one of the four coaches for seasons 1 and 2 Koen Wauters remained this season. The other three judges for seasons 1 and 2, Alex Callier, Jasper Steverlinck (winning coach of both seasons) and Natalia Druyts were replaced by Belgian DJ and record producer Regi Penxten, singer Axelle Red and musician, singer and songwriter Bent Van Looy. The title was won by Tom De Man from Team Bent Van Looy.

== Contestants ==
Contestants for the live shows were:

Team Regi

- Cas Vandecruys
- Dunja Mees
- Jamilla Baidou
- Johan Van Royen
- Joke Herremy
- Lisa Gilissen
- Melanie De Saedeleer
- Mikaël Ophoff

Team Koen

- Agnes De Raeve
- Belinda De Bruyn
- Eva De Geyter
- Eva Hendriks
- Laura Tesoro
- Lindsey De Bolster
- Seppe De Rooij
- Steph Van Uytvanck

Team Axelle

- Aurélie Van Rompay
- Dwayne Daeseleire
- Emma Lauwers
- Jessica Ndimubandi
- Koen en Jo Smets
- Laure Mot
- Peter Boone
- Steven Van den Panhuyzen

Team Bent

- Camille Van Wambeke
- Chloé Ditlefsen
- Cristina Sapalo
- Demi Eestermans
- Elie De Prijcker
- Jolan Standaert
- Mandy Nijssen
- Tom De Man
