= Yours Sincerely =

Yours Sincerely may refer to:

- "Yours sincerely", a valediction in a business letter
- Yours Sincerely (The Pasadenas album), 1992
- Yours Sincerely (Anna Bergendahl album), 2010
- Yours Sincerely (Haroumi Hosono album), 2026
- Yours Sincerely (film), a 1933 musical short starring Lanny Ross and Nancy Welford
- Yours Sincerely, Jim Reeves, a posthumous album by Jim Reeves, 1966

== See also ==
- Sincerely Yours (disambiguation)
- Yours truly (disambiguation)
- Yours (disambiguation)
- Sincerely (disambiguation)
