= Sincerity =

Virtue of honest and genuine communication

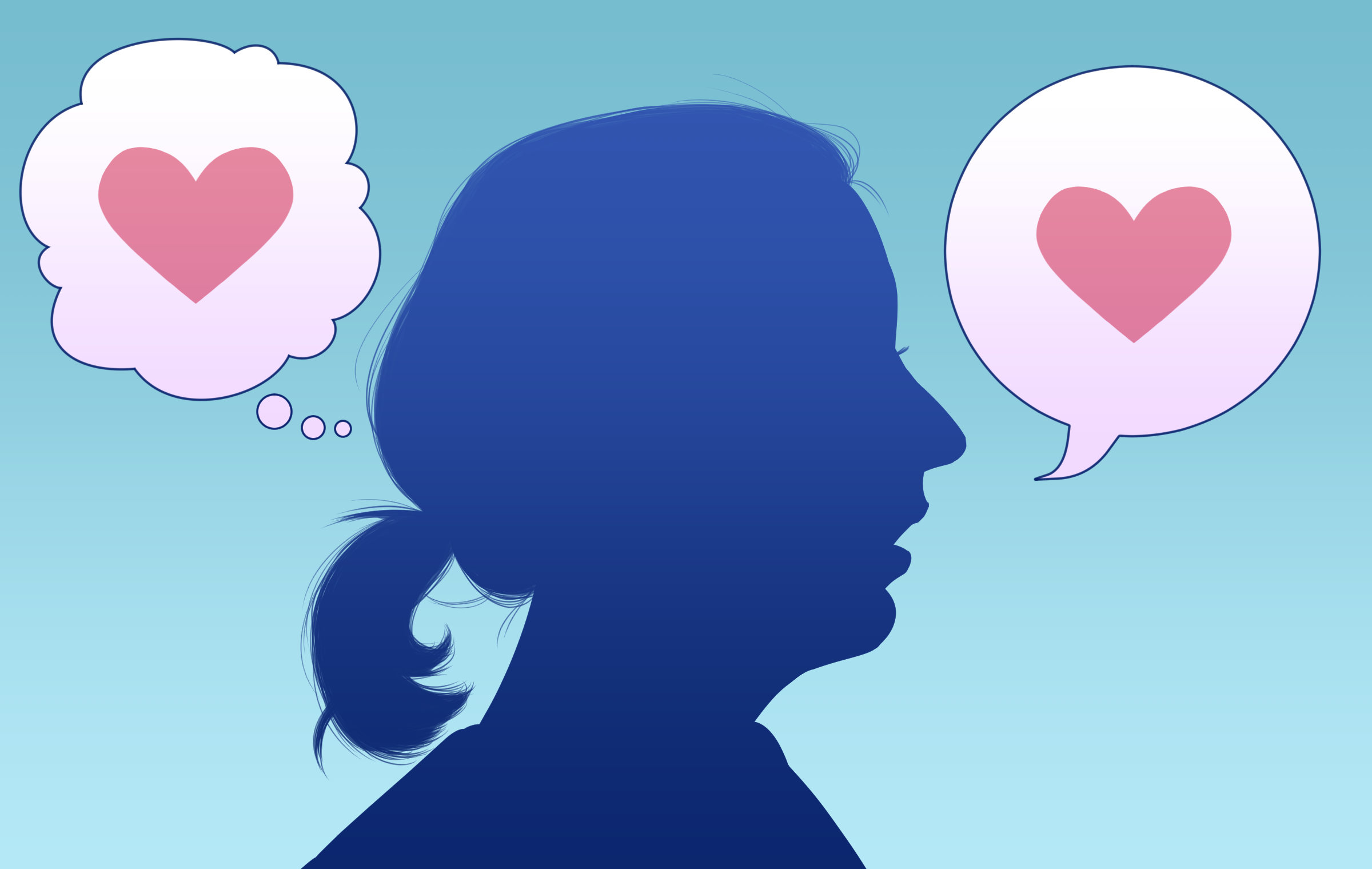
A person is sincere when their spoken words match their thoughts.

Sincerity is the virtue of one who communicates and acts in accordance with the entirety of their feelings, beliefs, thoughts, and desires in a manner that is honest and genuine. Sincerity in one's actions (as opposed to one's communications) may be called "earnestness".

== Etymology ==
The Oxford English Dictionary and most scholars state that sincerity from sincere is derived from the Latin sincerus meaning clean, pure, sound. Sincerus may have once meant "one growth" (not mixed), from sin- (one) and crescere (to grow). Crescere is cognate with "Ceres," the goddess of grain, as in "cereal".

According to the American Heritage Dictionary, the Latin word sincerus is derived from the Indo-European root *sm̥kēros, itself derived from the zero-grade of *sem (one) and the suffixed, lengthened e-grade of *ker (grow), generating the underlying meaning of one growth, hence pure, clean.

=== Controversy ===
An often repeated folk etymology proposes that sincere is derived from the Latin sine "without" and cera "wax". According to one popular explanation, dishonest sculptors in Rome or Greece would cover flaws in their work with wax to deceive the viewer; therefore, a sculpture "without wax" would be one that was honestly represented. It has been said, "One spoke of sincere wine... simply to mean that it had not been adulterated, or, as was once said, sophisticated." Another explanation is that this etymology "is derived from a Greeks-bearing-gifts story of deceit and betrayal. For the feat of victory, the Romans demanded the handing over of obligatory tributes. Following bad advice, the Greeks resorted to some faux-marble statues made of wax, which they offered as tribute. These promptly melted in the warm Greek sun." The Oxford English Dictionary states, however, that "there is no probability in the old explanation from sine cera 'without wax'".

The popularity of the without wax etymology is reflected in its use as a minor subplot in Dan Brown's 1998 thriller novel Digital Fortress, though Brown attributes it to the Spanish language, not Latin. Reference to the same etymology, this time attributed to Latin, later appears in his 2009 novel, The Lost Symbol.

== In Western societies ==
Sincerity was discussed by Aristotle in his Nicomachean Ethics. It resurfaced to become an ideal (virtue) in Europe and North America in the 17th century. It gained considerable momentum during the Romantic movement, when sincerity was first celebrated as an artistic and social ideal, exemplified in the writings of Thomas Carlyle and John Henry Newman. In middle to late nineteenth century America, sincerity was reflected in mannerisms, hairstyles, women's dress, and the literature of the time.

Literary critic Lionel Trilling dealt with the subject of sincerity, its roots, its evolution, its moral quotient, and its relationship to authenticity in a series of lectures published as Sincerity and Authenticity.

=== Aristotle's views ===
According to Aristotle "truthfulness or sincerity is a desirable mean state between the deficiency of irony or self-deprecation and the excess of boastfulness."

== In Islam ==
In the Islamic context, sincerity means: being free from worldly motives and not being a hypocrite. In the Qur'an, all acts of worship and human life should be motivated by the pleasure of God, and the prophets of God have called man to sincere servitude in all aspects of life. Sincerity in Islam is divided into sincerity in belief and sincerity in action. Sincerity in belief means monotheism—in other words not associating partners with God—and sincerity in action means performing sincere worship only for God.

== In East Asian societies ==
Sincerity is developed as a virtue in East Asian societies (e.g. China, Korea, and Japan). The concept of chéng (誠、诚)—as expounded in two of the Confucian classics, the Da Xue and the Zhong Yong—is generally translated as sincerity. As in the West, the term implies a congruence of avowal and inner feeling, but inner feeling is in turn ideally responsive to ritual propriety and social hierarchy. Specifically, Confucius's Analects contains the following statement in Chapter I: (主忠信。毋友不如己者。過，則勿憚改。) "Hold faithfulness and sincerity as first principles. Then no friends would not be like yourself (all friends would be as loyal as yourself). If you make a mistake, do not be afraid to correct it."

Thus, even today, a powerful leader will praise leaders of other realms as "sincere" to the extent that they know their place in the sense of fulfilling a role in the drama of life. In Japanese the character for chéng may be pronounced makoto, which carries still more strongly the sense of loyal avowal and belief.

== See also ==
- Honesty
- Insincere charm
- Parrhesia
- Radical Honesty
- Sincerely (disambiguation)
- New Sincerity
