= Eternally =

Eternally refers to the state of existing for eternity. It may also refer to:

== Music ==
=== Songs ===
- Eternally (1952 song), a song with music by Charlie Chaplin and lyrics by Geoff Parsons that has been covered by many artists
- "Eternally (Wanting You, Needing You)" Jackie Walker (singer), 1958
- "Eternally", a rockabilly song by Jane Bowman, 1961
- "Eternally", a song by The Chantels, 1963
- Eternally (Hikaru Utada song)

== Other ==
- Eternally (film), a 1957 film produced by Sampaguita Pictures
