= The Voice van Vlaanderen season 2 =

The Voice van Vlaanderen is a Belgian reality talent show. The second season of the Flemish version premiered on January 18, 2013 on the vtm television network.

The coaches for this season were Natalia Druyts, one of the most popular recording artists of Flanders and close runner-up of the first season of Idool; Koen Wauters, host and judge of several casting shows and band member of Clouseau; Jasper Steverlinck, who was topping the Flemish single charts with a cover of "Life on Mars"; and Alex Callier from Flemish band Hooverphonic.

The winner of the second season was Paulien Mathues. Because she belonged to Jasper Steverlink's team, Steverlink became the winning coach of The Voice for the second time.

== Contestants ==
Contestants for the live shows were:

Team Alex

- Olivier De Laet
- Jaouad Alloul
- Jelle Degens
- Kaat Verschueren
- Toni Verlinden
- Arnd Van Vlierden
- Lauren Zweegers
- Kaat Verschueren
- Timna Vanhecke

Team Koen

- Theo Dewitte
- Maria Theresa Morales
- Eva Van Puyvelde
- Niels Cockx
- Els Artois
- Patricia Lalomia
- Freija D'Hondt
- Jeroen Van Troyen

Team Jasper

- Paulien Mathues
- Matthijs Vanstaen
- Domien Cnockaert
- Sarah Godard
- Lisa Castelli
- Lori Eestermans
- Eva & Elias Storme
- Bert Van Renne

Team Natalia

- Robby Longo
- Jana De Valck
- Daniel López Montejo
- Chris Medaer
- Julie Barbé
- Jens Oomes
- Lucas Peeters
- Bjorn & Joeri Rotthier

== Blind auditions ==
Key	Coach hit his or her "I WANT YOU" button	Contestant eliminated with no coach pressing his or her "I WANT YOU" button	Contestant defaulted to this coach's team	Contestant elected to join this coach's team

=== Episode 1 (18 January 2013) ===
Order	Contestant	Song	Coaches' and Contestants' Choices			
Order	Contestant	Song	Alex Callier	Jasper Steverlinck	Koen Wauters	Natalia Druyts
1	Lucas Peeters	"Grenade" - Bruno Mars	—			
2	Domien Cnockaert	"Don't Look Back in Anger" - Oasis			—	—
3	Arnd Van Vlierden	"Rolling in the Deep" - Adele				
4	Elke Rammant	"Skinny Love" - Birdy	—	—	—	—
5	Jeroen Van Troyen	"Best of You" - Foo Fighters	—	—		
6	Timna Vanhecke	"No Woman, No Cry" - Bob Marley & the Wailers				
7	Bart Dhooge	"Tell Me It's Not Over" - Starsailor	—	—	—	—
8	Maria Theresa Morales	"If I Ain't Got You" - Alicia Keys	—	—		—
9	Julie Barbé	"Single Ladies (Put a Ring on It)" - Beyoncé	—	—	—	
10	Jasper Lauwers	"Boyfriend" - Justin Bieber	—	—	—	—
11	Robby Longo	"Bad Moon Rising" - John Fogerty	—	—	—	
12	Sarah Godard	"The A Team" - Ed Sheeran				

=== Episode 2 (25 January 2013) ===
Order	Contestant	Song	Coaches' and Contestants' Choices			
Order	Contestant	Song	Alex Callier	Jasper Steverlinck	Koen Wauters	Natalia Druyts
1	Jaouad Alloul	"My Kind of Love" - Emeli Sandé	—	—	—	
2	Kaat Verschueren	"Hometown Glory" - Adele			—	—
3	Chris Medaer	"Angie" - The Rolling Stones			—	
4	Stephanie Peeters	"Come Alive" - Netsky	—	—	—	—
5	Toni Verlinden	"Papillon" - Editors			—	—
6	Freija D'Hondt	"Uninvited" - Alanis Morissette				
7	Krystina Salcedo	"Come Together" - The Beatles	—	—		—
8	Elke Vandebroek	"Run" - Snow Patrol	—	—	—	
9	Matthijs Vanstaen	"The Blower's Daughter" - Damien Rice				
10	Karlien De Schutter	"Little Talks" - Of Monsters and Men	—	—	—	—
11	Bernd Wijnants	"Van God Los" - Monza	—	—	—	—
12	Tchiah Ommar	"Free Fallin'" - Tom Petty	—		—	—

=== Episode 3 (1 February 2013) ===
Order	Contestant	Song	Coaches' and Contestants' Choices			
Order	Contestant	Song	Alex Callier	Jasper Steverlinck	Koen Wauters	Natalia Druyts
1	Loredana De Amicis	"Nobody's Perfect" - Jessie J	—	—	—	
2	Niels Cockx	"Mia" - Gorky	—		—	—
3	Daniel López Montejo	"Chan Chan" - Buena Vista Social Club	—			
4	Kimberley Gibbs	"Mesmerized" - Faith Evans	—	—	—	—
5	Donna Van Dijck	"We Found Love" - Rihanna feat. Calvin Harris	—	—	—	—
6	Hermès Amerlinck	"All Along the Watchtower" - Bob Dylan		—	—	
7	Marijke De Roover	"Big Spender" - Shirley Bassey	—	—		—
8	Maxim Libbrecht	"Heart of Gold" - Neil Young	—	—	—	—
9	Jana De Valck	"Wherever You Will Go" - The Calling				
10	Gilles Thiry	"Jolene" - The White Stripes			—	—
11	Oriane De Carvalho	"Empire State of Mind" - Alicia Keys feat. Jay-Z	—	—	—	—
12	Eva en Elias Storme	"Fix You" - Coldplay		—		—

=== Episode 4 (8 February 2013) ===
Order	Contestant	Song	Coaches' and Contestants' Choices			
Order	Contestant	Song	Alex Callier	Jasper Steverlinck	Koen Wauters	Natalia Druyts
1	Lisa Castelli	"Lego House" - Ed Sheeran	—		—	—
2	Jens Oomes	"Jealous Guy" - Roxy Music	—	—	—	
3	Alden Muanza Dolomingo	"Georgia On My Mind" - Ray Charles	—	—	—	—
4	Lauren Zweegers	"I'd Rather Go Blind" - Trixie Whitley				
5	Victoria Popkova	"Songbird" - Fleetwood Mac	—	—	—	—
6	Mo Talib	"At Last" - Ella Fitzgerald	—	—		—
7	Nathalie Moers	"Love Me Like a Man" - Bonnie Raitt	—	—	—	
8	Davo Toma	"Afscheid Nemen Bestaat Niet" - Marco Borsato	—	—	—	—
9	Els Artois	"My Funny Valentine" - Ella Fitzgerald	—			
10	Gert Maex	"The Fear" - Ben Howard		—	—	—
11	Karin Alice Santos	"Give Your Heart a Break" - Demi Lovato	—	—	—	—
12	Patricia Lalomia	"Always" - Bon Jovi	—	—		—

=== Episode 5 (15 February 2013) ===
Order	Contestant	Song	Coaches' and Contestants' Choices			
Order	Contestant	Song	Alex Callier	Jasper Steverlinck	Koen Wauters	Natalia Druyts
1	Barbara Claerhout	"Me and Mrs. Jones" - Billy Paul	—	—		—
2	David Van den Hende	"So Sick" - Ne-Yo	—	—	—	—
3	Paulien Mathues	"Smile" - Lily Allen	—			—
4	Jessica Lamote	"Wildest Moments" - Jessie Ware		—	—	—
5	Jennifer Huyghe	"Price Tag" - Jessie J	—	—	—	
6	Jelle Degens	"Mad World" - Gary Jules				
7	Julie Van Tongerloo	"Love the Way You Lie" - Eminem feat. Rihanna	—	—	—	—
8	Eva Van Puyvelde	"To Love Somebody" - Bee Gees	—		—	—
9	Demi Eestermans	"So Sick" - Ne-Yo	—	—	—	—
10	Lori Eestermans	"Can't Take My Eyes Off You" - Frankie Valli	—		—	—
11	Bram Knockaert	"The A Team" - Ed Sheeran	—	—	—	—
12	Olivier De Laet	"Over My Head (Cable Car)" - The Fray		—	—	—

=== Episode 6 (22 February 2013) ===
Ordre	Candidat	Chanson	Choix des coachs et des candidats			
Ordre	Candidat	Chanson	Alex Callier	Jasper Steverlinck	Koen Wauters	Natalia Druyts
1	Lana Mardaga	"Your Song" - Elton John			—	—
2	Bert Van Renne	"Wildest Moments" - Jessie Ware	—		—	—
3	Sylvia Molleman	"When You're Good to Mama" - Chicago	—	—	—	—
4	Theo Dewitte	"Come Home" - Amatorski	—	—		—
5	Danny Wuyts	"Waiting for a Girl Like You" - Foreigner	—	—	—	—
6	Bjorn en Joeri Rotthier	"Creep" - Radiohead	—		—	
7	Sandy Miessi	"My Love is Your Love" - Whitney Houston	—		—	—
8	Brent Redant	"Rock This Town" - Stray Cats	—	—	—	

== Battles ==
Coaches begin narrowing down the playing field by training the contestants with the help of "trusted advisors". Each episode featured eight battles consisting two of pairings from within each team, and each battle concluding with the respective coach eliminating one of the two contestants; the six winners for each coach advanced to the live shows.

Coaches and assistant coaches

Alex Callier	Jasper Steverlinck	Koen Wauters	Natalia Druyts
Cathy Van Hoecke	David Poltrock	Vincent Pierins	Bert Gielen

— Battle winner
— Stolen by Alex
— Stolen by Jasper
— Stolen by Koen
— Stolen by Natalia

=== Episode 7 (1 March 2013) ===
Ordre	Coach	Candidat	Candidat	Chanson
1	Natalia Druyts	Jana De Valck	Jaouad Alloul	"Let Me Love You" - Ne-Yo
2	Alex Callier	Arnd Van Vlierden	Lana Mardaga	"Jackson" - Johnny Cash
3	Koen Wauters	Freija D'Hondt	Barbara Claerhout	"Price Tag" - Jessie J
4	Jasper Steverlinck	Tchiah Ommar	Bert Van Renne	"Under the Bridge" - Red Hot Chili Peppers
5	Natalia Druyts	Chris Medaer	Brent Redant	"A Little Less Conversation" - Elvis Presley
6	Alex Callier	Kaat Verschueren	Eva en Elias Storme	"Poison & Wine" - The Civil Wars

=== Episode 8 (8 March 2013) ===
Ordre	Coach	Candidat	Candidat	Chanson
1	Natalia Druyts	Daniel López Montejo	Jennifer Huyghe	"Rabiosa" - Shakira
2	Jasper Steverlinck	Lisa Castelli	Niels Cockx	"If I Needed You" - Townes Van Zandt
3	Alex Callier	Hermès Amerlinck	Timna Vanhecke	"Valerie" - The Zutons
4	Koen Wauters	Mo Talib	Els Artois	"Every Breath You Take" - The Police
5	Alex Callier	Lauren Zweegers	Gert Maex	"I Got You Babe" - Sonny & Cher
6	Jasper Steverlinck	Matthijs Vanstaen	Bjorn en Joeri Rotthier	"The Bitter End" - Placebo

=== Episode 9 (15 March 2013) ===
Order	Coach	Contestant	Contestant	Song
1	Jasper Steverlinck	Lori Eestermans	Sandy Miessi	"Coming Home" - Diddy-Dirty Money
2	Koen Wauters	Jeroen Van Troyen	Marijke De Roover	"Mercy" - Selah Sue & Triggerfinger
3	Natalia Druyts	Robby Longo	Nathalie Moers	"Islands In The Stream" - Kenny Rogers & Dolly Parton
4	Jasper Steverlinck	Gilles Thiry	Paulien Mathues	"Fascination" - Alphabeat
5	Alex Callier	Olivier De Laet	Domien Cnockaert	"You're Not Alone" - Mads Langer
6	Koen Wauters	Patricia Lalomia	Lucas Peeters	"Il Nous Faut" - Tom Dice & Elisa Tovati

=== Episode 10 (22 March 2013) ===
Order	Coach	Contestant	Contestant	Song
1	Natalia Druyts	Loredana De Amicis	Jens Oomes	"If I Never See Your Face Again" - Maroon 5 & Rihanna
2	Jasper Steverlinck	Sarah Godard	Eva Van Puyvelde	"Skyfall" - Adele
3	Alex Callier	Jessica Lamote	Toni Verlinden	"Candy" - Iggy Pop & Kate Pierson
4	Koen Wauters	Maria Theresa Morales	Krystina Salcedo	"Irreplaceable" - Beyoncé
5	Natalia Druyts	Elke Vandebroek	Julie Barbé	"Unwritten" - Natasha Bedingfield
6	Koen Wauters	Jelle Degens	Theo Dewitte	"Envoi" - Absynthe Minded

== Live shows ==
– Winner
– Kaat Verschueren quit after voice problems and was replaced by Lauren Zweegers

=== Episode 11 (29 March 2013) ===
Order	Coach	Contestant	Song	Result
1	Koen Wauters	Freija D'Hondt	"Crazy" - Gnarls Barkley	Eliminated
2	Koen Wauters	Jeroen Van Troyen	"Wicked Game" - Chris Isaak	Eliminated
3	Alex Callier	Kaat Verschueren	"Goodbye Kiss" - Kasabian	Eliminated
4	Alex Callier	Timna Vanhecke	"Kiss Me" - Sixpence None the Richer	Eliminated
5	Natalia Druyts	Robby Longo	"All Summer Long" - Kid Rock	Saved by the coach
6	Natalia Druyts	Lucas Peeters	"More" - Usher	Eliminated
7	Koen Wauters	Maria Theresa Morales	"Grenade" - Bruno Mars	Saved by the coach
8	Koen Wauters	Theo Dewitte	"Let Her Go" - Passenger	Saved by public vote
9	Jasper Steverlinck	Eva en Elias Storme	"Crucify" - Tori Amos	Eliminated
10	Jasper Steverlinck	Paulien Mathues	"You're the One That I Want" - John Travolta & Olivia Newton-John	Saved by the coach
11	Alex Callier	Jelle Degens	"Pumped Up Kicks" - Foster the People	Saved by public vote
12	Alex Callier	Jaouad Alloul	"Smells Like Teen Spirit" - Nirvana	Saved by the coach
13	Natalia Druyts	Bjorn en Joeri Rotthier	"Uprising" - Muse	Eliminated
14	Natalia Druyts	Jana De Valck	"Euphoria" - Loreen	Saved by public vote
15	Jasper Steverlinck	Bert Van Renne	"Baby Don't Worry" - Broken Glass Heroes	Eliminated
16	Jasper Steverlinck	Matthijs Vanstaen	"No Sound But The Wind" - Editors	Saved by public vote

=== Episode 12 (5 April) ===
Order	Coach	Contestant	Song	Result
1	Natalia Druyts	Julie Barbé	"Rich Girl" - Gwen Stefani	Eliminated
2	Natalia Druyts	Jens Oomes	"Build Me Up Buttercup" - The Foundations	Eliminated
3	Alex Callier	Lauren Zweegers	"Teardrops" - Womack & Womack	Saved by the coach
4	Alex Callier	Toni Verlinden	"Sweet Dreams" - Eurythmics	Eliminated
5	Jasper Steverlinck	Lisa Castelli	"Bulletproof" - La Roux	Eliminated
6	Jasper Steverlinck	Domien Cnockaert	"Sadness" - Stash	Saved by public vote
7	Natalia Druyts	Daniel López Montejo	"María" - Ricky Martin	Saved by the coach
8	Natalia Druyts	Chris Medaer	"House for Sale" - Lucifer	Saved by public vote
9	Koen Wauters	Eva Van Puyvelde	"Never Forget You" - Noisettes	Saved by the coach
10	Koen Wauters	Els Artois	"Melvin" - Arsenal	Eliminated
11	Alex Callier	Arnd Van Vlierden	"Breakfast In Vegas" - Praga Khan	Eliminated
12	Alex Callier	Olivier De Laet	"I Wanna Dance With Somebody" - Whitney Houston	Saved by public vote
13	Jasper Steverlinck	Sarah Godard	"Diamonds" - Rihanna	Saved by the coach
14	Jasper Steverlinck	Lori Eestermans	"Louisiana 1927" - Randy Newman	Eliminated
15	Koen Wauters	Niels Cockx	"Domino" - Clouseau	Saved by public vote
16	Koen Wauters	Patricia Lalomia	"Titanium" - David Guetta feat. Sia	Eliminated

=== Épisode 13 (12 avril) ===
Order	Coach	Contestant	Song	Result
1	Jasper Steverlinck	Matthijs Vanstaen	"Black and Gold" - Sam Sparro	Safe (coach's second choice)
2	Jasper Steverlinck	Domien Cnockaert	"How Can We Hang On To A Dream" - Tim Hardin	Saved by public vote
3	Alex Callier	Kaat Verschueren	"Take Another Little Piece of My Heart" - Dusty Springfield	Eliminated
4	Alex Callier	Jaouad Alloul	"All The Lovers" - Kylie Minogue	Safe (Coach's first choice)
5	Natalia Druyts	Chris Medaer	"Gimme All Your Lovin'" - ZZ Top	Eliminated
6	Natalia Druyts	Daniel López Montejo	"Burbujas de Amor" - Juan Luis Guerra	Safe (Coach's first choice)
7	Jasper Steverlinck	Paulien Mathues	"Delay" - Intergalactic Lovers	Safe (Coach's first choice)
8	Jasper Steverlinck	Sarah Godard	"Everybody Here Wants You" - Jeff Buckley	Eliminated
9	Koen Wauters	Niels Cockx	"Sinds 1 Dag of 2" - Doe Maar	Eliminated
10	Koen Wauters	Eva Van Puyvelde	"Limit to Your Love" - Leslie Feist	Safe (Coach's first choice)
11	Alex Callier	Olivier De Laet	"Sexy and I Know It" - LMFAO	Saved by public vote
12	Alex Callier	Jelle Degens	"Laura" - Bat for Lashes	Safe (Coach's second choice)
13	Natalia Druyts	Robby Longo	"American Pie" - Don McLean	Saved by public vote
14	Natalia Druyts	Jana De Valck	"Beneath Your Beautiful" - Emeli Sandé	Safe (Coach's second choice)
15	Koen Wauters	Theo Dewitte	"Don't You (Forget About Me)" - Simple Minds	Safe (Coach's second choice)
16	Koen Wauters	Maria Theresa Morales	"Eternal Flame" - The Bangles	Saved by public vote

=== Épisode 14 (19 April 2013) ===
Order	Coach	Contestant	Song	Result
1	Natalia Druyts	Daniel López Montejo	"Y Baila (En Dans)" - Clouseau	Eliminated
2	Natalia Druyts	Robby Longo	"Jessie" - Joshua Kadison	Saved by the coach
3	Jasper Steverlinck	Paulien Mathues	"Sweet Child o' Mine" - Guns N' Roses	Saved by public vote
4	Koen Wauters	Theo Dewitte	"That Look You Give That Guy" - Eels	Saved by the coach
5	Koen Wauters	Maria Theresa Morales	"Complicated" - Avril Lavigne	Saved by public vote
6	Alex Callier	Jaouad Alloul	"No Room for Doubt" - Lianne La Havas	Saved by the coach
7	Natalia Druyts	Jana De Valck	"...Baby One More Time" - Britney Spears	Saved by public vote
8	Koen Wauters	Eva Van Puyvelde	"Somebody That I Used to Know" - Gotye	Eliminated
9	Jasper Steverlinck	Domien Cnockaert	"I Promised Myself" - Nick Kamen	Eliminated
10	Jasper Steverlinck	Matthijs Vanstaen	"If You Could Read My Mind" - Gordon Lightfoot	Saved by the coach
11	Alex Callier	Jelle Degens	"Undercover Martyn" - Two Door Cinema Club	Eliminated
12	Alex Callier	Olivier De Laet	"Samson" - Regina Spektor	Saved by public vote

=== Episode 15 — Semi-final (26 April 2013) ===
Order	Coach	Contestant	Song	Result
1	Koen Wauters	Theo Dewitte	"Little Talks" - Of Monsters and Men	Finalist
2	Koen Wauters	Maria Theresa Morales	"Breakeven (Falling To Pieces)" - The Script	Eliminated
3	Alex Callier	Olivier De Laet	"Sweet Nothing" - Calvin Harris feat. Florence Welch	Finalist
4	Natalia Druyts	Robby Longo	"Pride" - U2	Finalist
5	Natalia Druyts	Jana De Valck	"Play" - Jennifer Lopez	Eliminated
6	Jasper Steverlinck	Matthijs Vanstaen	"Hollow Talk" - Choir of Young Believers	Eliminated
7	Koen Wauters	Maria Theresa Morales & Theo Dewitte	"Zanna" - Selah Sue & Tom Barman vs. The Subs	—
8	Natalia Druyts	Jana De Valck & Robby Longo	"Need You Now" - Lady Antebellum	—
9	Jasper Steverlinck	Paulien Mathues & Matthijs Vanstaen	"Trouble" - Coldplay	—
10	Alex Callier	Jaouad Alloul	"Get Out of Your Lazy Bed" - Matt Bianco	Eliminated
11	Jasper Steverlinck	Paulien Mathues	"Friday I'm in Love" - The Cure	Finalist
12	Alex Callier	Olivier De Laet & Jaouad Alloul	"To All The Girls I've Loved Before" - Willie Nelson & Julio Iglesias	—

==== Result ====
Coach	Contestant	Coach's points	Public's points	Total	Result	Song
Koen Wauters	Theo Dewitte	65	42	107	Finalist	"Vibrant Eyes"
Koen Wauters	Maria Theresa Morales	35	58	93	Eliminated	—
Natalia Druyts	Robby Longo	55	59	114	Finalist	"The World"
Natalia Druyts	Jana De Valck	45	41	86	Eliminated	—
Jasper Steverlinck	Paulien Mathues	45	61	106	Finalist	"There's Some Place I've Got To Be"
Jasper Steverlinck	Matthijs Vanstaen	55	39	94	Eliminated	—
Alex Callier	Olivier De Laet	50	77	127	Finalist	"Stay"
Alex Callier	Jaouad Alloul	50	23	73	Eliminated	—

=== Episode 16 — Final (3 May 2013) ===
Order	Coach	Contestant	Song
1	Natalia Druyts	Robby Longo	"All Summer Long" - Kid Rock
2	Alex Callier	Olivier De Laet & Alex Callier	"Nothing Compares 2 U" - Stereophonics
3	Koen Wauters	Theo Dewitte & Koen Wauters	"The Boxer" - Simon & Garfunkel - Mumford & Sons
4	Jasper Steverlinck	Paulien Mathues	"Smile" - Lily Allen
5	Alex Callier	Olivier De Laet	"Sexy and I Know It" - LMFAO
6	Jasper Steverlinck	Paulien Mathues & Jasper Steverlinck	"Love Is A Losing Game" - Amy Winehouse
7	Koen Wauters	Theo Dewitte	"Let Her Go" - Passenger
8	Natalia Druyts	Robby Longo & Natalia Druyts	"Don't It Make My Brown Eyes Blue" - Crystal Gayle

==== Result ====
Position	Contestant	Coach	Result
1	Paulien Mathues	Jasper Steverlinck	Winner
2	Robby Longo	Natalia Druyts	
—	Theo Dewitte; Olivier De Laet	Koen Wauters; Alex Callier	Eliminated
