= Sincerely Yours (Jo Stafford album) =

Compilation album by Jo Stafford
- Released: May 9, 2006
- Genre: Traditional pop
- Label: Sepia Records

Sincerely Yours is a 2006 compilation album of songs recorded by American singer Jo Stafford. It was released on May 9, 2006 on the Sepia Records label.

The "Hollywood House Party" included on the album was a special release of Columbia Records in 1955. It was recorded at a party Stafford and husband Paul Weston gave at their home. Columbia had produced several new phonographs in 1955; part of their sales promotion for them was to give buyers of units valued at $100 or more the Columbia House Party album, which was not available any other way. One side of the album featured the party with celebrities at the Weston's California home, while the other featured Mitch Miller's New York City party. Those who attended the Weston's Hollywood house party and are heard on this album include Liberace, Dave Brubeck and Frankie Laine.

== Track listing ==
1. "Travelling Salesman Polka"
2. "Prisoner of Love's Song"
3. "Love, Mystery and Adventure"
4. "Juanita"
5. "Sweet and Low"
6. "As You Desire Me"
7. "Blue Moon"
8. "Without My Lover (Bolero Gaucho)"
9. "Blue Skies"
10. "If It Takes Me All My Life"
11. "What Good Am I Without You"
12. "The Christmas Blues"
13. "Adi-Adios-Amigo (Il Passerotto)"
14. "Let Me Hear You Whisper"
15. "Nearer My Love to Me"
16. "Darling! Darling! Darling!"
17. "It Is Springtime"
18. "Each Step of the Way"
19. "The Lord Is My Shepherd"
20. "Please Don't Go So Soon (Wenn Die Liebe Will)"
21. "I Cover the Waterfront"
22. "Dancing on the Ceiling"
23. "Ain't Cha-Cha Comin' out Tonight?"
24. "Arriverderci, Darling"
25. "Cripple Creek/Goin' Down the Road"
26. "Mona Lisa (Sung in Italian)"
27. "Hey Ho, Anybody Home/Swing Low Sweet Chariot"
28. "Swanee River"
29. "Nice Work If You Can Get It"
30. "Camille"
