= Tourist LeMC =

Flemish singer

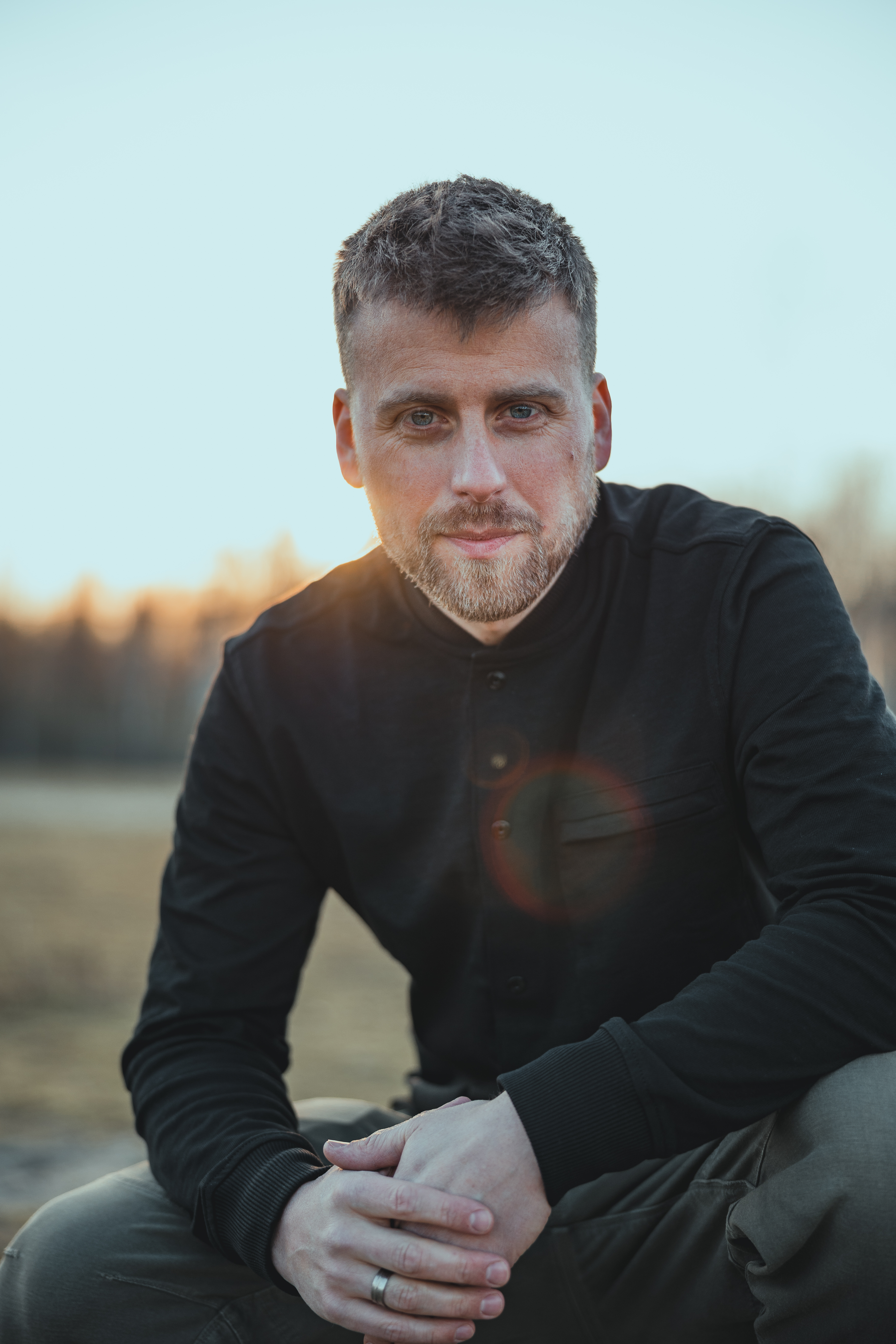

Background information
- Also known as: Tourist
- Born: Johannes Faes; October 9, 1984 (age 42); Schoten, Belgium
- Origin: Belgium
- Genres: Hip hop; cabaret; reggae; folk
- Occupations: Singer; composer
- Website: tourist-lemc.be

Tourist LeMC (born 1984, in Schoten) is the artist name of Flemish singer Johannes Faes. He sings in an adaptation of the local Antverpian dialect, altered with non-local sounds and emphases; his music is mainly influenced by French hip-hop, as well as reggae, cabaret, and folk.

== Biography ==
Johannes Faes was born the third of four sons in Schoten on October 9, 1984. His mother is a nurse, his father a teacher. He is married to his former Polish neighbour Marta, with whom he has three sons. He graduated from university as a social worker.

In December 2010, Faes' debut album Antwerps Testament appeared, and in 2012 he reached the finals of the Flemish music competition Humo's Rock Rally. Antwerp Testament was reissued in 2013 under the Dutch hip-hop label TopNotch. The album was completely remastered and two bonus songs were added: "Visa Paspor", featuring rapper Typhoon, and "Small Prayer", featuring Sticky Steez. Both songs were picked up as singles by different radio stations.

In 2014, he released two EPs during preparations for his new album, En Route, which came out in early 2015. Among other songs, one of the EPs includes a cover of a song by Wannes Van de Velde. Later that year, Faes earned a gold music certification for this album. In January 2016, he gained more fame and recognition by being nominated for five Music Industry Awards and winning two, as "best singer in Dutch" and "breakthrough of the year".

In November 2018, Faes' third album, We begrijpen mekaar (We understand each other), was released. Just like En Route, this record was produced by Youssef Chellak. A month later, the album went Gold.

On April 2, 2021, the fourth album Niemandsland was released at 1 in the chart of the Ultratop. This album features collaborations with Meskerem Mees, Bert Ostyn from Absynth Minded and Wally. The album consists of two parts; the long player Niemandsland on the one hand and the covers of Liefde voor Muziek on the other. The cover of the album is an oil painting made by Marta Mataczynska, wife of Tourist.

== Discography ==
Album(s) with hits in the Flemish Ultratop 50	Year of release	Highest position	Number of weeks	Remarks
Antwerps Testament	2010	-	-	
En Route	2015	2	238	BEA: 2× Platinum
We begrijpen mekaar	2018	1	50	
Niemandsland	2021	1	-	
Alles onder controle	2025	1	-	

EP(s)	Year of release	Highest position	Number of weeks	Remarks
Bilan	2014	-	-	
Deze Nacht	2014	-	-	

Single(s) with hits in the Flemish Ultratop 50	Year of release	Highest position	Number of weeks	Album
"Klein Gebedje"	2013	-	-	Antwerps Testament
"Visa Paspor"	2013	71	-	Antwerps Testament
"Bilan"	2014	99	-	En route
"Deze nacht"	2014	68	-	En route
"En Route"	2015	18	5	En route
"Koning Liefde"	2015	17	15	En route
"De troubadours" (with Flip Kowlier)	2015	35	9	En route
"Horizon" (with Wally )	2016	6	28	En route
"Meester kunstenaar" (with Bart Peeters)	2016	19	9	En route
"Spiegel" (with Raymond van het Groenewoud)	2018	2	18	We begrijpen mekaar
"We begrijpen mekaar"	2018	32	6	We begrijpen mekaar
"Oprechte leugens" (with Alice on the Roof)	2019	35	4	We begrijpen mekaar
"Tramontane"	2019	50	1	We begrijpen mekaar
"Ubuntu"	2019	26	5	Non-album single
"Welkom"	2020	Tip2		We begrijpen mekaar
"Bal aan de voet"	2021	41		Niemandsland
"De ander"	2024	34		Non-album single

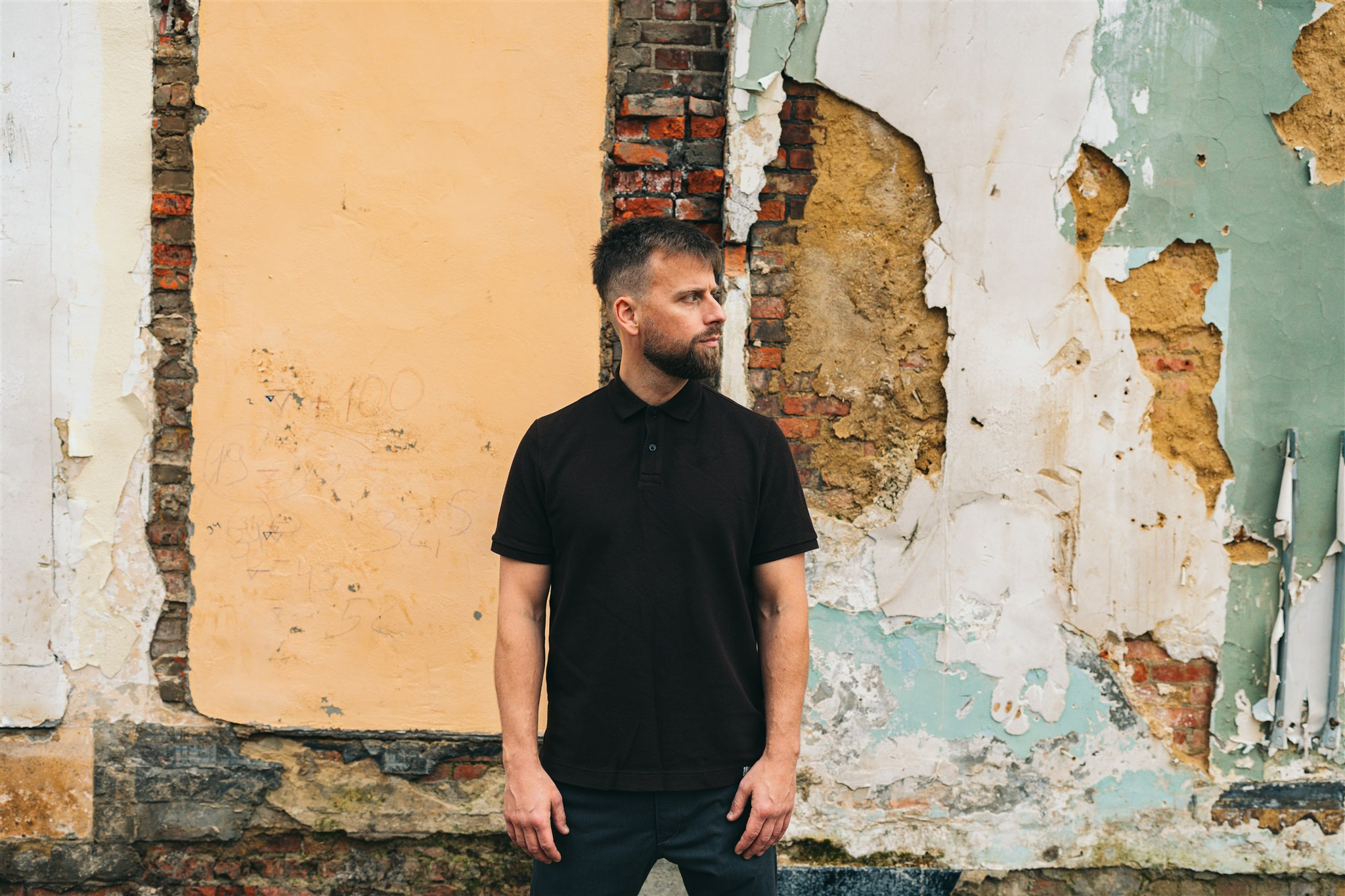
