= Truthfully =

Truthfully may refer to:

- "Truthfully", a 1997 song by Lisa Loeb from the album Firecracker
- "Truthfully", a 2013 song by Brymo from the album Merchants, Dealers & Slaves
- "Truthfully", a 1998 song by Brandy from the album Never Say Never
- "Truthfully", a 2016 song by DNCE from the album DNCE
- "Truthfully", a 2005 song by Corey Clark

== See also ==
- Truly (disambiguation)
