= Forever Yours =

Forever Yours may refer to:

== Film and television ==
- Forever Yours (1930 film), an unreleased film starring Mary Pickford
- Forever Yours (1936 film) or Forget Me Not, a British musical drama
- Forever Yours (1945 film), an American drama film
- Forever Yours (1952 film), a Mexican drama film
- Forever Yours (1959 film), an Egyptian film
- Forever Yours (2004 film), a Hong Kong film directed by Clifton Ko
- Forever Yours (telenovela) or Eternamente tuya, a 2009 Mexican telenovela

== Music ==
=== Albums ===
- Forever Yours (Dottie West album) or the title song, 1970
- Forever Yours (Luv' album), 1980
- Forever Yours (The Sylvers album) or the title song, 1978
- Forever Yours (Tony Terry album), or the title song, 1987

=== Songs ===
- "Forever Yours" (Alex Day song), 2011
- "Forever Yours" (Every Little Thing song), 1998
- "Forever Yours" (Tribute), by Kygo, with Avicii and Sandro Cavazza, 2020
- "Forever Yours", by Carl Perkins, B-side to "That's Right", 1957
- "Forever Yours", by Edward W. Hardy from the 2012 play The Woodsman
- "Forever Yours", by Five Star, B-side to "Whenever You're Ready", 1987
- "Forever Yours", by Janet Jackson, a B-side to "Come Give Your Love to Me", 1983
- "Forever Yours", by Nightwish from Century Child, 2002
- "Forever Yours", by the Romantics from National Breakout
- "Forever Yours", by Sunrise Avenue from On the Way to Wonderland, 2006

== Other ==
- Forever Yours (drug), a nickname for the psychoactive drug 2CT2-5-EtO
- Forever Yours (horse) (born 1933), an American Thoroughbred racehorse
- Forever Yours, a variant of the Milky Way chocolate bar
- Forever Yours, an imprint of Forever, an imprint of Grand Central Publishing
- "Forever yours", a form of valediction at the end of written correspondence

== See also ==
- Eternally Yours (disambiguation)
