= Bent Van Looy =

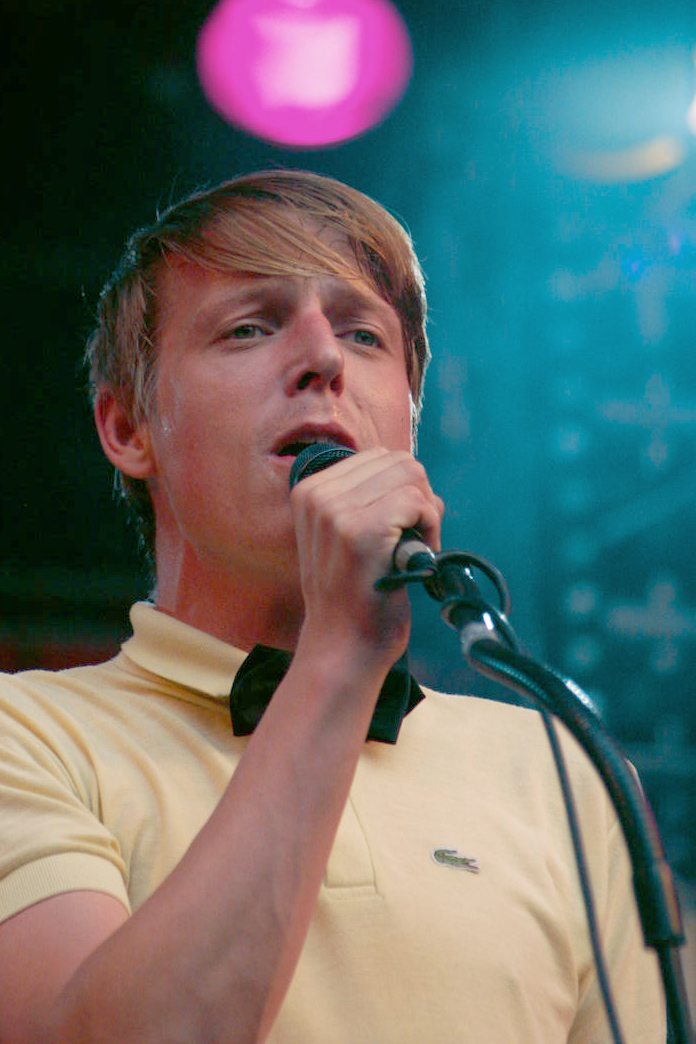
- Van Looy performing at the Booch Festival

Background information
- Born: 3 May 1976 (age 50); Ghent, Belgium
- Genre: Pop
- Occupations: Singer, drummer, mc
- Years active: 1994–present
- Labels: PIAS, Capitol, EMI
- Member of: Das Pop
- Website: www.bentvanlooy.com

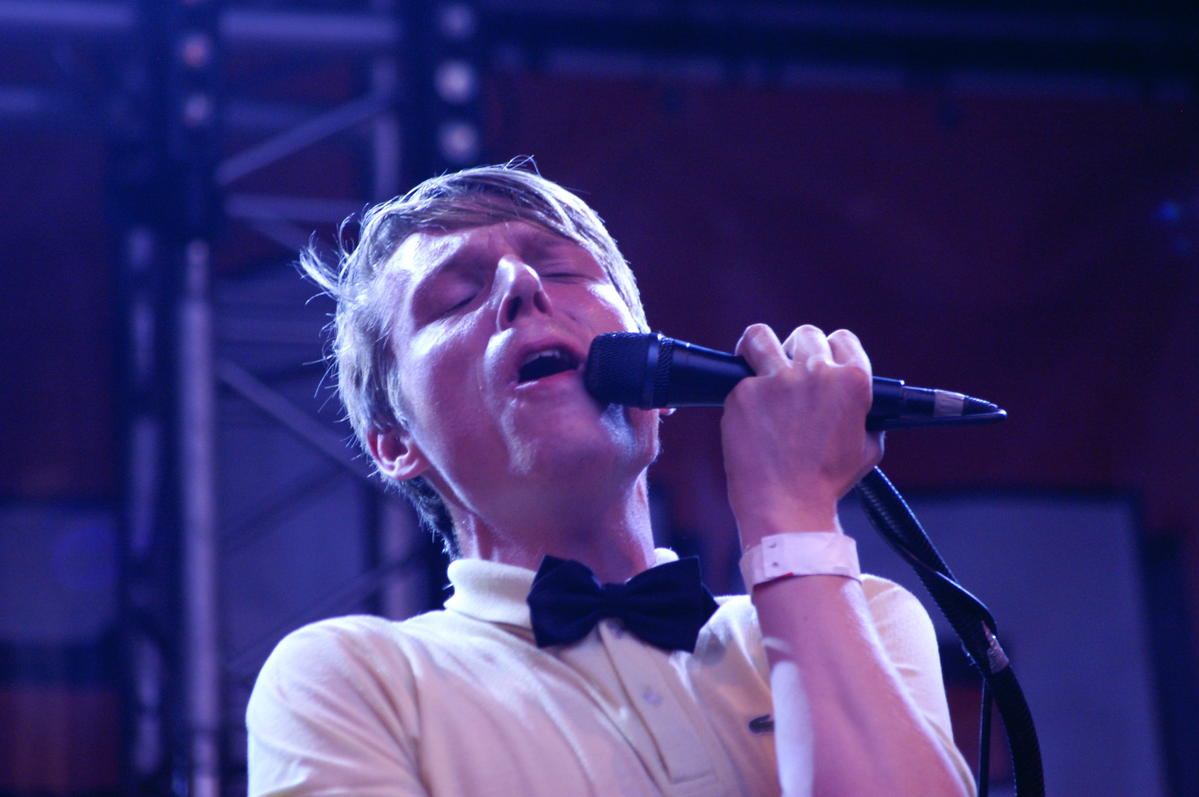
Bent Van Looy with DasPop in 2007

Bent Van Looy (born 3 May 1976) is a Belgian-Flemish musician, singer and songwriter. He has been the frontman and singer for Das Pop, the Belgian band he founded in Ghent in 1994 together with schoolfriends Reinhard Vanbergen, Niek Meul and Lieven Moors. He was also the drummer of Soulwax, a project of the Dewaele brothers. Van Looy recorded solo albums, presented on TV and radio, and is a painter.

== In Das Pop ==
Bent Van Looy's band Das Pop was initially called Things to Come, but the band later changed its name to Das Pop. The band has released four albums: I ♥ (2000), The Human Thing (2003), Das Pop (2009) and The Game (2011). In November 2012, the band announced a break and performed their last concert in December that year.

== Solo ==
Bent van Looy became drummer for Soulwax and he toured as MC throughout Europe along concert halls like Ethias Arena, Brixton Academy, Telefonica Open de Madrid, Palacio da bolsa and many others with Soulwaxmas, the Christmas party organised by Soulwax

In 2013, Bent Van Looy released his first solo album Round the Bend, produced in Los Angeles by Jason Falkner. Director Dimitri van Zeebroeck also shot a documentary with similar title to be distributed with the album.

His second solo album Pyjama days was released in 2016. Yours Truly was released in 2018. Both albums were recorded in Los Angeles with producer Jason Falkner.

Van Looy started painting again after a long break and held a solo exhibition The Vessel, the Jerk and the Edge of Reason in the summer of 2020 in gallery Super Dakota in Brussels. His works were exhibited in 2022 at Art Brussels, an international contemporary art fair.

== In popular culture ==
In 2008 he took part in exhibition organized by Centre for Fine Arts, Brussels known as Bozar under the title "It's not only Rock 'n' Roll baby" as one of twenty artists who expressed themselves with both music and art.

In 2010 he had his own Sunday afternoon program on Studio Brussel: Single Safari. He also designed clothing for the French fashion house Le Mont Saint Michel. Since 2012 he has his own clothing line on the market, The Jante Law and in 2012, designed the label of a French wine named 'Cuvée B.V.L.

Van Looy has been also active in reality television series appearing in a quiz De Slimste Mens ter Wereld in 2009–2010 finishing third losing to winner Linda De Win and runner-up Peter Vandermeersch.

He was also coach for the third season of the music competition The Voice van Vlaanderen. The season was broadcast from 7 February 2014 to 23 May 2014 on the vtm television network. Bent Van Looy became the winning coach with his contestant Tom De Man carrying the title. He returned in season 4 (2016), but he was replaced by musician Alex Callier in season 5.

In 2016 and 2017, he presented the cultural talk show Culture Club with Sofie Lemaire on Belgian TV-network Canvas. In 2019 he was an actor in the Flemish television series Fiskepark.

In 2021 he started presenting the Culture Club a Flemish radio program. Since 2022, he has been participating in the Voorproevers on Belgian Radio 1 where he discusses books, documentaries or podcasts.

== Discography ==
(For discography with Das Pop, see discography on that page)

=== Albums ===
Year	Album	Peak positions	Notes
Year	Album	BEL (Fl)	Notes
2013	Round the Bend	7	Track listing: 1. "Flowers and Balloons" (3:28); 2. "The Hard Part" (4:17); 3. "I Will Show You" (3:11); 4. "Round the Bend" (2:46); 5. "Friendly With the Fleas" (3:37); 6. "Words" (2:45); 7. "Home" (4:09); 8. "Shoulders" (3:11); 9. "Shadow of a Man" (3:16); 10. "Young Man" (3:27); 11. "First Boy From the Right" (3:46); 12. "Why I'm Leaving" (4:57)
2016	Pyjama Days	1	
2018	Yours Truly	73	

=== Singles ===
Year	Single	Peak positions		Albums
Year	Single	BEL (Fl) Ultratop	BEL (Fl) Ultratip	Albums
2013	"Shadow of a Man"	—	2	Round the Bend
2013	"Flowers and Balloons"	—	9	Round the Bend
2014	"Words"	—	23	Round the Bend
2016	"My Escape"	50	—	Pyjama Days
2016	"Downtown Train"	—	9	Pyjama Days
2017	"Wat een leven" (with VRT Big Band)	—	13	
2018	"The Open Road"	—	34	
