= Joost Klein discography =

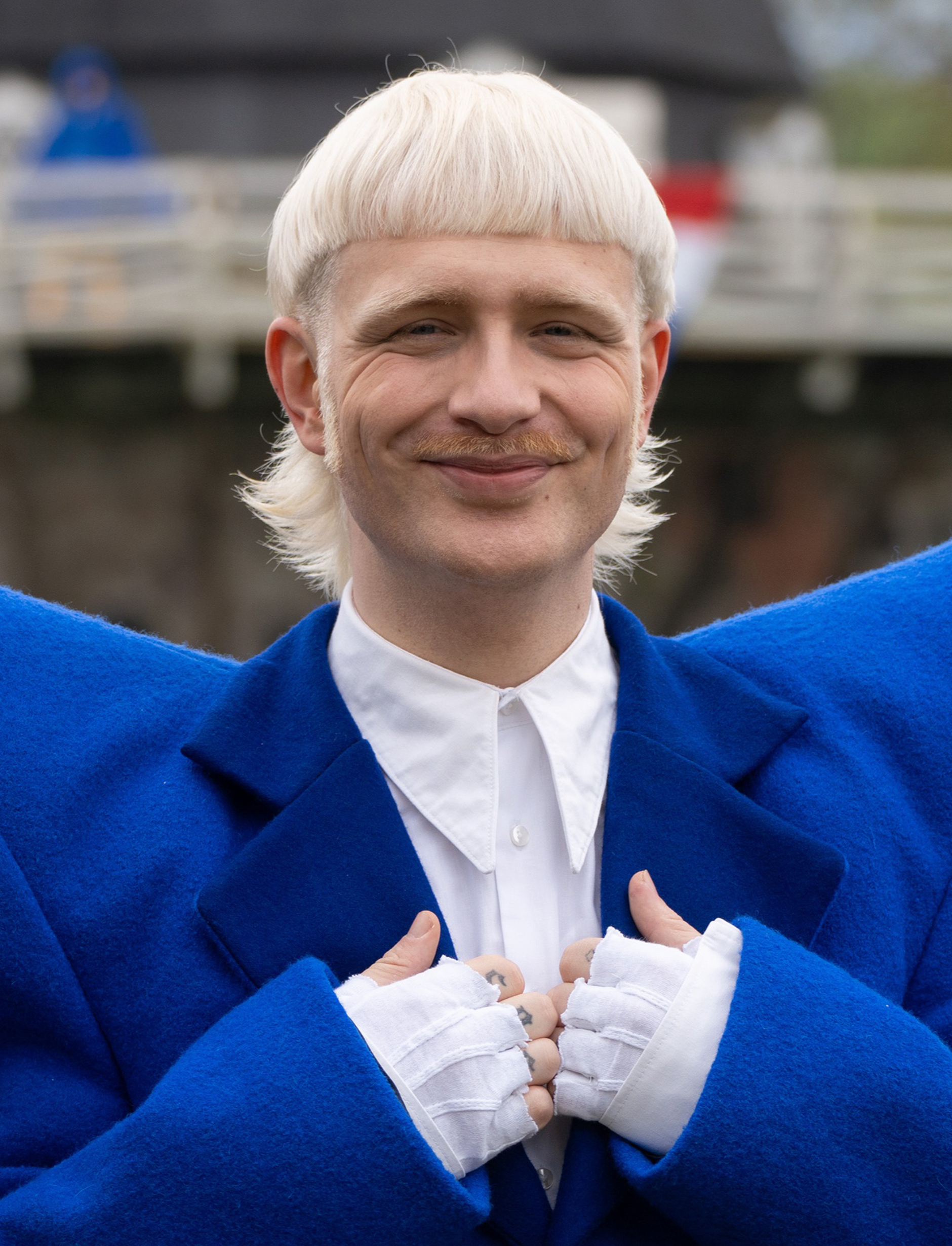
- Joost Klein in 2024
- Studio albums: 10
- EPs: 3
- Singles: 41
- Music videos: 30
- Demos: 5
- Featured appearances: 14

Dutch musician Joost Klein has released ten studio albums, three extended plays (EP), and 41 singles.

In 2016, he released his debut album Dakloos (transl. 'Homeless'), after which he began focusing on a career in music. "Bitches" was his first music video that would reach a million views on YouTube. He was briefly signed to TopNotch in 2017 and 2018, but eventually decided to set up his own record label, Albino Sports.

On 20 October 2017, Klein released the mixtape Scandinavian Boy, followed by the singles "Meeuw" (transl. 'Seagull') and "Ome Robert" (transl. 'Uncle Robert') in 2018. On 3 August 2018, Klein released the studio album M van Marketing together with Dutch rapper Donnie. To promote the album, the duo organised a one-time concert titled Viraal in Carré in the Carré theatre in Amsterdam.

Klein wrote a small book of poems titled Albino, which was published on 14 November 2018. Klein has mentioned that he wrote the book because of his father, who had also written a book and encouraged him to do the same. To promote his studio album of the same title, Klein organised the Het gaat niet zo goed (transl. 'It is not going too well') concert tour in 2019, during which he visited venues such as Paard, De Oosterpoort, Doornroosje and Paradiso. He concluded the tour in Paradiso on 3 March 2019. The following summer, Klein performed at major Benelux festivals such as Pukkelpop, Pinkpop, Lowlands, and Zwarte Cross.

On 15 November 2019, Klein released the album 1983, the title of which refers to the birth year of Klein's older brother. Klein collaborated with music producers Mick Spek, Kauwboy and Tantu Beats on the album. On 24 April 2020, Klein released the album Joost Klein 7, which consists of seven songs, including a collaboration with Canadian rapper bbno$. On 7 August of the same year, he released the single "Ik wil je" (transl. 'I want you'), a remix of the eponymous song by the Belgian band De Kreuners.

Klein released his eighth studio album on 13 September 2022, titled Fryslân after his home province of Friesland. The album features the singles "Florida 2009", "Wachtmuziek" and "Papa en mama", and was fully produced by producer Tantu Beats. Various samples can be heard on the album, such as samples of the Dutch ska band Doe Maar and Crazy Frog. In "Florida 2009", Klein reflects on the death of his parents.

In 2023, Klein scored his first hit in Germany with "Friesenjung", a collaboration with German rapper Ski Aggu and an adaptation of a song by East Frisian comedian Otto Waalkes. The song reached first place on the German Single Top 100. Later that year, he was chosen to represent the Netherlands in the Eurovision Song Contest 2024 with the song "Europapa", which was released on 29 February 2024. Klein performed in the second semi-final of the contest on 9 May, and having qualified, was scheduled to perform in position 5 in the final on 11 May. Due to a backstage incident, Klein was disqualified from the competition on the day of the final. Following the contest, Klein released the singles "Luchtballon", "The Bird Song", and "Fußball (World Cup 1998)", followed by a collaboration with Käärijä titled "Trafik!" on 12 July. On February 21, Klein released his ninth album Unity. The album features the pre-released singles "Europapa", "Friesenjung", "Luchtballon", as well as new singles "Filthy Dog" and "Why Not???". On January 1 2026, Klein released his tenth studio album Kleinkunst. The album features the pre-released single “Latin Gabber.” The album also features the following artists: horsegiirlL, MCR-T, Daan Koens, Vieze Asbak, gladde paling, internetcafe24/7, I’m DMA, jailbreak iphone now, Anouk, Mark Foster, ADF samaki, Mr. Polska, and DJ Lucas.

== Studio albums ==
List of studio albums, with selected chart positions and details
Title	Details	Peak chart positions				Certifications
Title	Details	NLD	BEL (FL)	FIN	LTU	Certifications
Dakloos	Released: 1 June 2016; Label: Made; Formats: Digital download, streaming	177	—	—	—	
Scandinavian Boy	Released: 20 October 2017; Label: Made; Formats: Digital download, streaming	12	121	—	—	NVPI: Gold
M van Marketing (with Donnie)	Released: 3 August 2018; Label: Made; Formats: Digital download, streaming	10	79	—	—	
Albino	Released: 18 January 2019; Label: Albino Sports; Formats: Digital download, streaming	5	43	—	10	
1983	Released: 15 November 2019; Label: Albino Sports; Formats: Digital download, streaming	18	25	—	—	
Joost Klein 7	Released: 24 April 2020; Label: Albino Sports; Formats: Digital download, streaming	—	14	—	—	
Albino Sports, Vol. 1 (with Brunzyn)	Released: 1 April 2021; Label: Albino Sports; Formats: Digital download, streaming	—	70	—	—	
Fryslân	Released: 30 September 2022; Label: Albino Sports; Formats: CD, digital download, streaming	4	5	—	7	
Unity	Released: 21 February 2025; Label: Self-released; Formats: Digital download, streaming	16	18	36	34	
Kleinkunst	Released: 1 January 2026; Label: Self-released; Formats: Digital download, streaming	20	55	—	—	
"—" denotes an album that did not chart or was not released in that territory.

== Extended plays ==
Title	Details	Peak chart positions	
Title	Details	NLD	BEL (FL)
Europapa: Greatest Hits	Released: 5 April 2024; Label: Self-released; Formats: Digital download, streaming	—	—
Boyband (with Käärijä and Tommy Cash)	Released: 11 May 2026; Label: Self-released; Formats: Digital download, streaming	—	—
Dutch Hardcore	Released: 31 July 2026; Label: Self-released; Formats: Digital download, streaming	29	27

== Singles ==
=== Charted and certified singles ===
List of charted and certified singles, with selected peak chart positions
Title	Year	Peak chart positions										Certifications	Album or EP
Title	Year	NLD	AUT	BEL (FL)	FIN	GER	LAT	LTU	SWE	SWI	WW	Certifications	Album or EP
"Meeuw" (with Stefano Keizers)	2018	— (Note: "Meeuw" did not enter the Dutch Single Top 100, but peaked at number seven on the Single Tip chart.)	—	—	—	—	—	—	—	—	—		Albino
"Ome Robert"	2018	— (Note: "Ome Robert" did not enter the Dutch Single Top 100, but peaked at number two on the Single Tip chart.)	—	—	—	—	—	21	—	—	—		Albino
"Parmezaan & Linkerbaan" (with Donnie)	2018	— (Note: "Parmezaan & Linkerbaan" did not enter the Dutch Single Top 100, but peaked at number seven on the Single Tip chart.)	—	—	—	—	—	—	—	—	—		M van Marketing
"Buurman"	2019	— (Note: "Buurman" did not enter the Dutch Single Top 100, but peaked at number 29 on the Single Tip chart.)	—	— (Note: "Buurman" did not enter the official Belgian Ultratop 100 charts, but appeared on the Flanders Ultratip Bubbling Under 50 chart.)	—	—	—	—	—	—	—		1983
"Midlife Crisis"	2019	—	—	— (Note: "Midlife Crisis" did not enter the official Belgian Ultratop 100 charts, but appeared on the Flanders Ultratip Bubbling Under 50 chart.)	—	—	—	—	—	—	—		Non-album single
"Joost Klein 2"	2019	—	—	— (Note: "Joost Klein 2" did not enter the official Belgian Ultratop 100 charts, but peaked at number 29 on the Flanders Ultratip Bubbling Under 50 chart.)	—	—	—	—	—	—	—		1983
"Mayo, No Fries!" (with bbno$)	2020	—	—	— (Note: "Mayo, No Fries!" did not enter the official Belgian Ultratop 100 charts, but appeared on the Flanders Ultratip Bubbling Under 50 chart.)	—	—	—	—	—	—	—		Joost Klein 7
"Ham?"	2020	—	—	— (Note: "Ham?" did not enter the official Belgian Ultratop 100 charts, but appeared on the Flanders Ultratip Bubbling Under 50 chart.)	—	—	—	—	—	—	—		Joost Klein 7
"Ik wil je" (with De Kreuners)	2020	—	—	— (Note: "Ik wil je" did not enter the official Belgian Ultratop 100 charts, but peaked at number 18 on the Flanders Ultratip Bubbling Under 50 chart.)	—	—	—	—	—	—	—		Non-album single
"Gewoon goed" (with Brunzyn featuring Donnie)	2021	—	—	— (Note: "Gewoon goed" did not enter the official Belgian Ultratop 100 charts, but appeared on the Flanders Ultratip Bubbling Under 50 chart.)	—	—	—	—	—	—	—		Albino Sports, Vol. 1
"Wachtmuziek" (with StuBru)	2022	— (Note: "Wachtmuziek" did not enter the Dutch Single Top 100, but peaked at number six on the Single Tip chart.)	—	—	—	—	—	68	—	—	—	BRMA: Gold	Fryslân
"Florida 2009"	2022	— (Note: "Florida 2009" did not enter the Dutch Single Top 100, but peaked at number 10 on the Single Tip chart.)	—	—	—	—	—	—	—	—	—	BRMA: Gold	Fryslân
"Friesenjung" (with Ski Aggu and Otto Waalkes)	2023	18	1	—	—	1	15	12	100	7	— (Note: "Friesenjung" did not enter the Billboard Global 200, but peaked at number 115 on the Billboard Global Excl. US chart.)	IFPI AUT: Platinum; BRMA: Gold; BVMI: Platinum; IFPI SWI: Gold	Denk mal drüber nach... and Unity
"Droom groot"	2023	82	—	—	—	—	—	84	—	—	—		Non-album single
"Europapa"	2024	1	5	1	2	13	1	1	4	12	37	BRMA: 5× Platinum; NVPI: Gold	Unity
"Luchtballon"	2024	4	—	15	—	—	—	48	—	—	—	BRMA: Platinum	Unity
"Trafik!" (with Käärijä)	2024	84	—	—	5	—	—	60	—	—	—		Non-album single
"Filthy Dog"	2024	— (Note: "Filthy Dog" did not enter the Dutch Single Top 100, but peaked at number 10 on the Single Tip chart.)	—	—	—	—	—	—	—	—	—		Unity
"Why Not???"	2025	— (Note: "Why Not???" did not enter the Dutch Single Top 100, but peaked at number 27 on the Single Tip chart.)	—	—	—	—	—	—	—	—	—		Unity
"Boerenland" (with Donnie)	2025	— (Note: "Boerenland" did not enter the Dutch Single Top 100, but peaked at number seven on the Single Tip chart.)	—	—	—	—	—	—	—	—	—		Non-album singles
"Hyvää puuta" (with Käärijä)	2026	—	—	—	35	—	—	—	—	—	—		Non-album singles
"—" denotes a recording that did not chart or was not released in that territory.

=== As featured artist ===
Title	Year	Peak chart positions			Album or EP
Title	Year	NLD Tip	BEL (FL)	LTU	Album or EP
"Youtube Money" (Fijne Vrienden featuring Lexxxus The Don, Joost, Youngster The Don, Martin Verschoor, and Jasper Staal)	2016	—	—	*	Non-album singles
"Boner in de Club" (Veras featuring Mick Spek and Joost)	2017	—	—	*	Non-album singles
"René Froger" (Donnie featuring Joost)	2017	—	—	*	Non-album singles
"Relevant" (Bassistent featuring Joost)	2017	—	—	*	Non-album singles
"Zwaailicht" (Abel featuring Joost)	2017	—	—	*	Non-album singles
"Vroom (Remix)" (Famke Louise featuring Donnie and Joost)	2017	—	—	*	Non-album singles
"Friesland" (Rarri Jackson featuring Jiri11 and Joost)	2018	—	—	—	Non-album singles
"Snelle Planga (Remix)" (Donnie featuring Bizzey, Bokoesam, Lange Frans, Joost and Joel Beukers)	2018	—	—	—	Non-album singles
"Heritage" (Mick Spek featuring Joost)	2018	—	—	—	Mick Spek
"Infected" (Steen, Steff, and EZG featuring Joost)	2018	—	—	—	Infected
"Absurd" (Milli on GO featuring Joost)	2019	—	—	—	Non-album single
"Brunzyn en Jim" (Brunzyn featuring Gotu Jim and Joost)	2019	—	—	—	Brunzyn!
"Klaar!" (Brunzyn featuring Joost)	2019	—	—	—	Brunzyn!
"Meine Bolide 2003" (Yung Petsi featuring Ka$per Hits and Joost)	2021	—	—	—	Non-album singles
"Monster Energy" (Rarri Jackson featuring Joost)	2021	—	—	—	Non-album singles
"Go, Acid!" (Acid featuring Joost and Apson)	2021	—	41	—	Non-album singles
"Fossiel" (FeestDJRuud featuring Yung Petsi, Donnie, Joost, and Ka$per Hits)	2022	—	—	—	Non-album singles
"Heroïne" (Parsa and Vieze Asbak featuring Joost)	2023	—	—	—	Parsalicious
"Wa dachte?" (Viccens featuring Joost and Kleine Crack)	2023	—	—	—	Non-album single
"Buurman uit Berlijn" (MCR-T featuring Joost)	2024	8	—	75	Not the Same ≠
"Max Win" (Christ Dillinger featuring Joost)	2026	—	—	—	Non-album single
"—" denotes a recording that did not chart or was not released in that territory. " * " denotes that the chart did not exist at that time.

=== Other singles ===
Title	Year	Album or EP
"511"	2015	Non-album singles
"Feminist on da Block"	2017	Non-album singles
"Jan Peter Balkenende"	2017	Non-album singles
"Chubby"	2018	Non-album singles
"Glaassie Water"	2018	Albino
"Hallo Nederland"	2020	Non-album single
"Albino Sports Anthem" (with Brunzyn)	2021	Albino Sports, Vol. 1
"Fok de blok"	2021	Non-album single
"Papa en Mama"	2021	Fryslân
"Rookpauze 2" (with Vieze Asbak)	2022	Non-album singles
"Bier Freestyle"	2022	Non-album singles
"Bruder + Schwester" (with Gladde Paling)	2023	Non-album singles
"The Bird Song"	2024	Non-album singles
"Fußball (World Cup 1998)" (with Apson and MC Águia Pantera)	2024	Non-album singles
"All Inclusive Türkiye"	2025	Non-album singles
"Luv U More" (with Scooter and Paul Elstak)	2025	Non-album singles
"Everyday (Everyday)"	2025	Kleinkunst
"Tweedehands"	2025	Non-album single
"Latin Gabber" (with Vieze Asbak)	2025	Kleinkunst
"Coachella"	2026	Non-album singles
"Kutmuziek"	2026	Non-album singles
"Hate Music"	2026	Non-album singles

== Other charted songs ==
Title	Year	Peak chart positions		Album or EP
Title	Year	NLD	BEL (FL) Tip	Album or EP
"Scandinavian Boy"	2017	77	— (Note: "Scandinavian Boy" appeared on the Flanders Ultratip Bubbling Under chart, but did not enter the top 50.)	Scandinavian Boy
"Albino" (featuring Tice)	2019	—	30	Albino
"Bus gemist" (featuring Mick Spek and Daan Koens)	2019	—	— (Note: "Bus gemist" appeared on the Flanders Ultratip Bubbling Under chart, but did not enter the top 50.)	Albino
"Fryslân Bop" (featuring Jack Parow)	2022	60	—	Fryslân
"—" denotes a recording that did not chart or was not released in that territory.

== Other collaborations ==
Title	Year	Album
"Neymar" (Daniel Got Hits featuring Joost and Bassistent)	2018	America's Fav Whiteboy
"Donkey Kong" (Teske featuring Joost)	2018	Porselein
"Georgina Verbaan" (Brunzyn featuring Joost)	2018	3134
"They Don't Know" (Jacin Trill featuring Joost)	2019	Baby met een mening
"Skin Care" (Rare Akuma featuring Joost)	2022	Dirtytwominus
"Jackass" (CMH featuring Joost)	2022	Mudblood
"Dis kak, maarit naai" (Van Pletzen featuring Joost)	2023	Enter the Grootness
"Normalje Bass" (Russian Village Boys featuring Joost)	2023	Villagecation
"Snowboy Freestyle" (Chri$stophe featuring Joost)	2023	High Off Life
"Opzij (Ringtone)" (Herman van Veen featuring Joost)	2025	Herman van Veen Plus
"Don Julio" (Gladde Paling featuring Joost and VDV)	2026	Onderwaterwereld
