= Droom Groot =

2023 single by Joost Klein

Single by Joost Klein
- Released: 25 August 2023
- Genre: Gabberpop; eurodance
- Label: Albino Sports
- Songwriters: Joost Klein; Tantu Beats
- Producer: Tantu Beats

Joost Klein singles chronology
"Wa Datche?" (2023)	"Droom Groot" (2023)	"Buurman uijt Berlijn" (2024)

"Droom Groot" (Dream Big) is a single by Dutch musician Joost Klein. It was released as a non-album single on 25 August 2023.

== Background ==
Droom Groot was released with production continuing with Dutch disc jockey and producer Tantu Beats. The song is mentioned in the lyrics as a "gabber-pop exclusive". During the performance at Lowlands in 2023, Tantu recorded the crowds voices as a backing vocal and was then added in the song.

Joost revealed that the song wasn’t intended for release, and was only an experiment, but following such success with Friesenjung, he released the song later in August 2025.

Droom Groot is also Joost’s motto, which translates to "Dream Big", the motto expresses how he overcame difficulties within his life. The lyrics also include references to the Dutch song "Opzij" by Herman van Veen, the cartoon characters Huey, Dewey and Louie, and video game Minecraft.

There was rumours that Droom Groot was going to be Joost’s song in the Eurovision Song Contest 2024, but this was later debunked as his other single from his studio album Unity named Europapa.

== Track listing ==
=== Digital ===
1. "Droom Groot" — 3:01

== Charts ==
Chart performance for "Droom Groot"
Chart (2023)	Peak position
Netherlands (Single Top 100)	82
Lithuania (Singles Top 100)	84
