= The Voice van Vlaanderen season 10 =

Season of television series

The Voice van Vlaanderen
- Season 10
- Promotional poster featuring coaches Wauters, Terryn, Klein, and Tesoro
- Hosted by: An Lemmens; Aster Nzeyimana
- Coaches: Koen Wauters; Joost Klein; Laura Tesoro; Mathieu Terryn; Maarten & Dorothee (Comeback stage)
- No. of contestants: 73
- Winner: Bas Serra
- Winning coach: Koen Wauters
- Runner-up: Maëlle Moquet
- No. of episodes: 16

Release
- Original network: VTM
- Original release: 13 February – 29 May 2026

The tenth season of The Voice van Vlaanderen premiered on February 13, 2026 on VTM. On 13 November 2025, it was announced that Koen Wauters and Mathieu Terryn would return for their tenth and third seasons, respectively. At the same time, it was announced that Laura Tesoro would join the main panel this season after being the "Comeback Stage" coach in the previous three seasons and Joost Klein would debut as a coach. Maarten & Dorothee are the new "Comeback Stage" coaches, replacing Tesoro, selecting contestants to participate in The Voice: Comeback Stage. An Lemmens returned for her tenth season as host, with Aster Nzeyimana returning for his second season as host.

Bas Serra from Team Koen won the competition on 29 May 2026, marking Wauters' third win as a coach. With Serra's win, Wauters became the first coach in the history of the show to win three seasons.

== Coaches and host ==
=== Coaches ===
The Voice van Vlaanderen season 10 main coaches

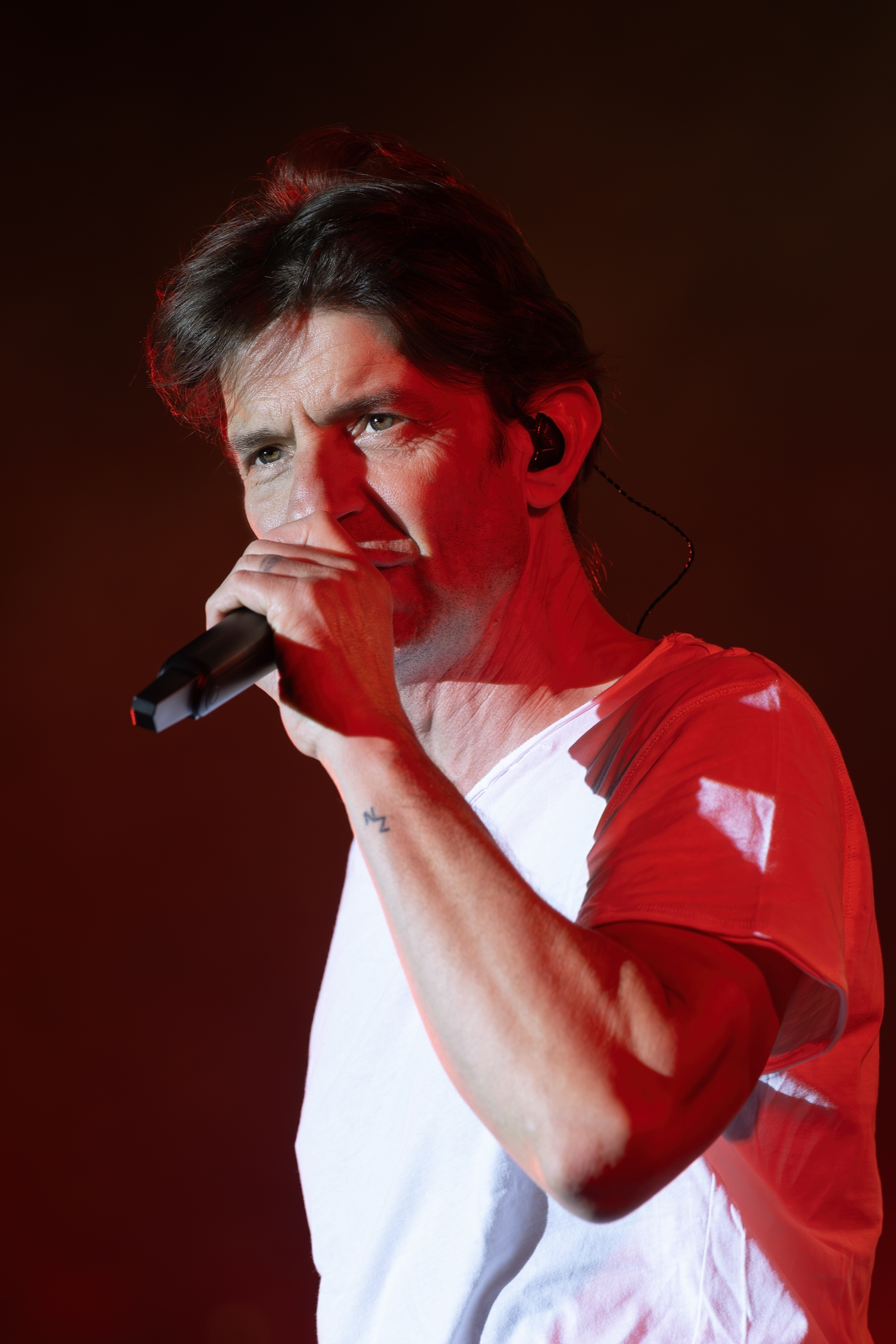
Koen Wauters

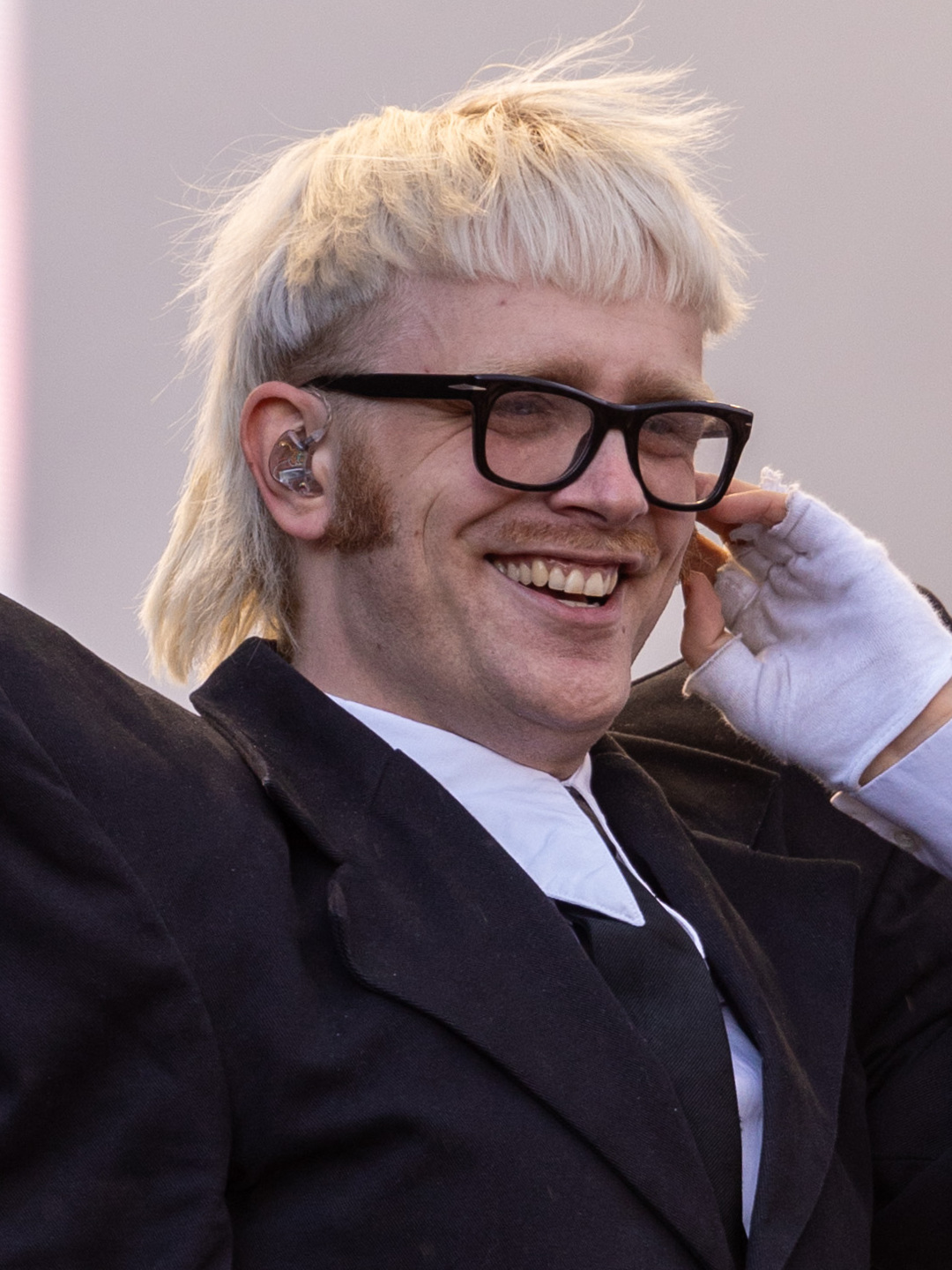
Joost Klein

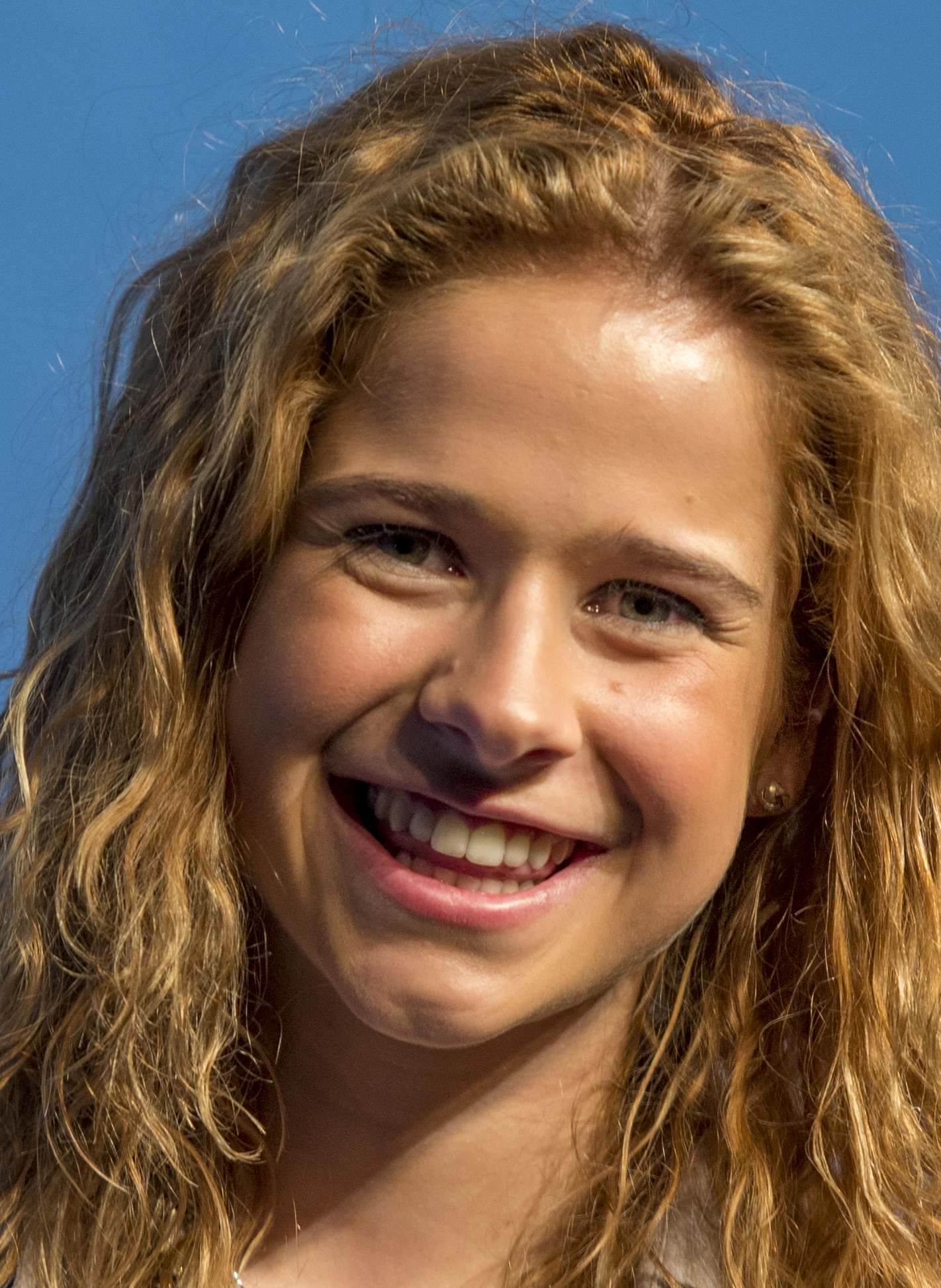
Laura Tesoro

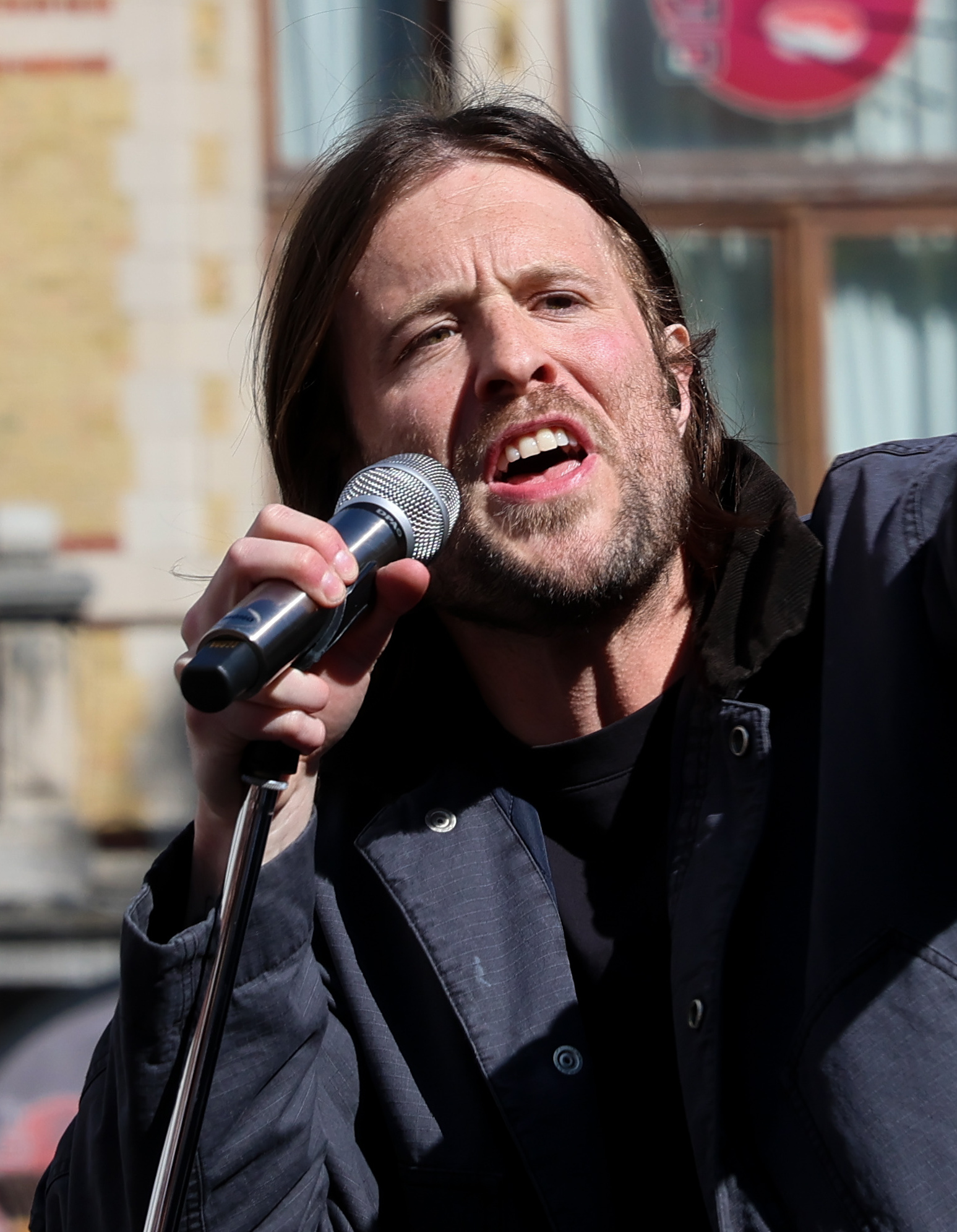
Mathieu Terryn

On 31 March, it was announced that Natalia Druyts would be leaving the show after eight seasons. On 13 November 2025, VTM announced that Jan Paternoster would leave the show after two seasons and that Koen Wauters and Mathieu Terryn would return for their tenth and third seasons, respectively, additionally Joost Klein would be joining the show. On the same date, Laura Tesoro was to join the main panel, with Maarten & Dorothee would be the new comeback stage coaches. With Maarten & Dorothee joining the show, they became the first duo to serve as coaches for the Comeback Stage.

=== Hosts ===
An Lemmens and Aster Nzeyimana returned as hosts for their tenth and second seasons, respectively.

== Teams ==
Main competition color key

- Winner
- Runner-up
- Third Place
- Fourth Place
- Eliminated in the Live Shows
- Eliminated, but was selected to participate in the Comeback Stage
- Eliminated in the Cross Battles
- Eliminated in Big Battles

Comeback Stage color key

- Eliminated in the Finale
- Eliminated in the Big Battles
- Eliminated in the Sing-Offs

Coaches	Top 73 Artists				
Koen Wauters					
Koen Wauters	Bas	~~Niels~~	3 of a Kind	Wim	Ines
Koen Wauters	Tokie	~~Lizabet~~	Brecht	Max	Pieter
Koen Wauters	Renée	Terry	Tetiana	Vicky	Yasmina
Joost Klein					
Joost Klein	Maëlle	Silke	Rebecca	Maarten	Sea
Joost Klein	~~Giorgio & Michelle~~	~~Abigail~~	~~Louise~~	Hanna	Ibe
Joost Klein	Jean	Johan	Matthew	Paulien	
Laura Tesoro					
Laura Tesoro	Joris	Hafsa	Aïcha	~~Liuwa~~	Jeremy
Laura Tesoro	Yaro	~~Jens~~	~~Marie-Hélène~~	~~Ricardo~~	Febe
Laura Tesoro	Jamaica	Jasmine	Lina	Mirte	Noëlle
Laura Tesoro	Norah	Sofian			
Mathieu Terryn					
Mathieu Terryn	Mike	Naz	Karry	~~Finn~~	~~Liza~~
Mathieu Terryn	Marson	~~Justine~~	Babs	Donatella	Doris
Mathieu Terryn	Julie	Lara	Ruth	Tobi	Yasmiene
Maarten & Dorothee					
Maarten & Dorothee	Finn	Timon	Amélie	Giorgio & Michelle	Lore
Maarten & Dorothee	Marie-Hélène	Niels	Liuwa	Charity	Lizabet
Maarten & Dorothee	Abigail	Liza	Joke	Ricardo	Jens
Maarten & Dorothee	Louise	Justine	Sarah-Marie	Eleonora	Wannes
Maarten & Dorothee	Bram	Noah	Zinneb	Nore	
Note: Italicized names are stolen artists (names struck through within former teams).

== Blind Auditions ==
=== Introduction ===
The Blind Auditions premiered on February 13, 2026 being aired on a weekly basis. Same as last season, artists who did not get any coach turned around would have the chance to compete in "The Comeback Stage" if selected by the fifth coaches Maarten & Dorothee. The "block" buttons returned, however this season, the coaches cannot block a coach individually, each coach is given one "ultimate block", which blocks all other coaches that have turned around. This feature can only be used after the artists performance.

The coaches performed "Ik Wil Je" to kick off the blind auditions.

Blind auditions color keys
✔	Coach pressed "I WANT YOU" button
	Artist defaulted to this coach's team
	Artist elected to join this coach's team
	Artist was eliminated and was not invited back for "The Comeback Stage"
	Artist was eliminated, but got a second chance to compete in "The Comeback Stage"
	Artist received a 'four-chair-turn'
✘	Coach pressed "I WANT YOU" button, lost the chance to pitch by another coach's ultimate block:
	Blocked by Koen; Blocked by Joost; Blocked by Laura; Blocked by Mathieu

=== Blind Auditions Results ===
Episode	Order	Artist	Age	Song	Coach's and artist's choices			
Episode	Order	Artist	Age	Song	Koen	Joost	Laura	Mathieu
Episode 1 (February 13)	1	Aïcha	18	"Chain of Fools"	✔	✔	✔	✔
Episode 1 (February 13)	2	Brecht	27	"Iris"	✔	–	–	–
Episode 1 (February 13)	3	Doris	27	"Dancing in the Dark"	–	–	✔	✔
Episode 1 (February 13)	4	Lukas	24	"Warrior"	–	–	–	–
Episode 1 (February 13)	5	Abigail^{1}	17	"Never Enough"	–	✔	✔	–
Episode 1 (February 13)	6	Norah	18	"Girls Just Wanna Have Fun"	–	✔	✔	–
Episode 1 (February 13)	7	Ibe	26	"The Chain"	–	✔	–	–
Episode 1 (February 13)	8	Nore	18	"undressed"	–	–	–	–
Episode 1 (February 13)	9	Babs	25	"Dancing on My Own"	✔	✔	–	✔
Episode 1 (February 13)	10	Joke	20	"Highway to Hell"	–	–	–	–
Episode 1 (February 13)	11	Jean	22	"Desert Rose"	✔	✔	✔	✔
Episode 2 (February 20)	1	Michelle	22	"O del mio dolce ardor"	–	✔	–	✔
Episode 2 (February 20)	2	Finn	24	"Atlantic City"	✔	–	✔	✔
Episode 2 (February 20)	3	Hafsa^{2}	28	"Cardigan"	✔	–	✔	✔
Episode 2 (February 20)	4	Zinneb^{2}	34	"Always Remember Us This Way"	–	–	–	–
Episode 2 (February 20)	5	Donatella	23	"From the Start"	–	✔	–	✔
Episode 2 (February 20)	6	Matthew	33	"The Emptiness Machine"	✔	✔	–	–
Episode 2 (February 20)	7	Tokie	46	"Beautiful Things"	✔	–	–	–
Episode 2 (February 20)	8	Samia	25	"Heaven"	–	–	–	–
Episode 2 (February 20)	9	Noëlle	20	"Oscar Winning Tears"	–	–	✔	–
Episode 2 (February 20)	10	Amélie	19	"Bad Dreams"	–	–	–	–
Episode 2 (February 20)	11	Sea	20	"I See Red"	✘	✔	✘	✘
Episode 3 (February 27)	1	Silke	20	"Fallin'"	–	✔	–	✔
Episode 3 (February 27)	2	Liuwa	18	"Feet Don't Fail Me Now"	–	–	✔	✔
Episode 3 (February 27)	3	Noah	20	"One Thing I Can't Erase"	–	–	–	–
Episode 3 (February 27)	4	Wim	41	"The Wolf"	✔	–	✔	✔
Episode 3 (February 27)	5	Aron	30	"Blijf Bij Mij"	–	–	–	–
Episode 3 (February 27)	6	Febe	22	"Valerie"	–	–	✔	–
Episode 3 (February 27)	7	Lara	24	"Stay"	–	–	–	✔
Episode 3 (February 27)	8	Charly	27	"Gold Plated Love"	–	–	–	–
Episode 3 (February 27)	9	Pieter	42	"Sing A Song For You"	✔	–	–	✔
Episode 3 (February 27)	10	Giorgio	18	"Can't Help Falling in Love"	–	✔	–	–
Episode 3 (February 27)	11	Bas	17	"the grudge"	✔	✘	✘	✘
Episode 4 (March 6)	1	Ruth	32	"Video Games"	–	–	–	✔
Episode 4 (March 6)	2	Paulien	28	"Bleed the Freak"	–	✔	–	–
Episode 4 (March 6)	3	Tobi	30	"Tighten Up"	–	–	✔	✔
Episode 4 (March 6)	4	Niels	49	"Tennessee Whiskey"	✔	–	✔	–
Episode 4 (March 6)	5	Lore	19	"Gun In My Hand"	–	–	–	–
Episode 4 (March 6)	6	Yaro	22	"Something in the Orange"	✔	–	✔	✔
Episode 4 (March 6)	7	Muriel	29	"Redemption Song"	–	–	–	–
Episode 4 (March 6)	8	Sofian^{3}	18	"Sorry I'm Here for Someone Else"	–	–	✔	–
Episode 4 (March 6)	9	Ines^{4}	17	"I'll Never Love Again"	✔	–	✔	✔
Episode 4 (March 6)	10	Lore	19	"Stilte Na De Storm"	–	–	–	–
Episode 4 (March 6)	11	Louise	21	"Don't Worry About Me"	✔	✔	✔	✔
Episode 5 (March 13)	1	Max	19	"A Song for You"	✔	–	✔	–
Episode 5 (March 13)	2	Sarah-Marie	25	"The House of the Rising Sun"	–	–	–	–
Episode 5 (March 13)	3	Jens	21	"Lonely"	–	–	✔	–
Episode 5 (March 13)	4	Vicky	32	"Birds of a Feather" (in Dutch)	✔	✔	–	–
Episode 5 (March 13)	5	Mike	20	"Fly Me to the Moon"	–	✔	✔	✔
Episode 5 (March 13)	6	Justine	24	"That's So True"	–	–	–	✔
Episode 5 (March 13)	7	Gaëlle	30	"The Giver"	–	–	–	–
Episode 5 (March 13)	8	Maarten	27	"Laat Me"	–	✔	–	–
Episode 5 (March 13)	9	Jasmine	22	"Finesse"	✔	✔	✔	–
Episode 5 (March 13)	10	Bram	33	"Good Luck, Babe!"	–	–	–	–
Episode 5 (March 13)	11	Naz	17	"Habibi"	✘	✘	✘	✔
Episode 6 (March 20)^{5}	1	Karry	21	"I Believe to My Soul"	✔	–	–	✔
Episode 6 (March 20)^{5}	2	Lewis	27	"Ob-La-Di, Ob-La-Da"	–	–	–	–
Episode 6 (March 20)^{5}	3	Lina	28	"New Rules"	–	–	✔	✔
Episode 6 (March 20)^{5}	4	Marie-Hélène	27	"Nobelprijs"	–	–	✔	–
Episode 6 (March 20)^{5}	5	Orquidea	21	"Ben"	–	–	–	–
Episode 6 (March 20)^{5}	6	Terry	35	"Stayin' Alive"	✔	–	–	–
Episode 6 (March 20)^{5}	7	Jamaica	20	"Runnin' (Lose It All)"	✔	–	✔	✔
Episode 6 (March 20)^{5}	8	Hanna	17	"Atlas"	–	✔	–	–
Episode 6 (March 20)^{5}	9	Eleonora	44	"Black Velvet"	–	–	–	–
Episode 6 (March 20)^{5}	10	Jeremy	29	"Jealous"	✔	✔	✔	✔
Episode 7 (March 27)	1	3 of a Kind (Maxim, Tessa & Tina)	—N/a	"L'enfer"	✔	–	✔	–
Episode 7 (March 27)	2	Roel	52	"One"	–	–	–	–
Episode 7 (March 27)	3	Mirte	26	"The Greatest"	✘	✘	✔	✘
Episode 7 (March 27)	4	Liza^{6}	19	"Levitating"	–	–	–	✔
Episode 7 (March 27)	5	Timon	28	"Too Sweet"	–	–	–	–
Episode 7 (March 27)	6	Tetiana	28	"One Day"	✔	✔	–	✔
Episode 7 (March 27)	7	Julie	21	"Can't Catch Me Now"	–	–	–	✔
Episode 7 (March 27)	8	Yasmiene	26	"The Best"	✔	–	–	✔
Episode 7 (March 27)	9	Charity^{7}	25	"Zombie"	–	–	–	–
Episode 7 (March 27)	10	Gwinny	34	"I Just Want to Make Love to You"	–	–	–	–
Episode 7 (March 27)	11	Joris	28	"Halleujah"	✔	✔	✔	✔
Episode 8 (April 3)	1	Lizabet	23	"Hotel California"	✔	✔	–	–
Episode 8 (April 3)	2	Ricardo	19	"What Was I Made For?"	–	–	✔	–
Episode 8 (April 3)	3	Amber	23	"Kan Je Me Zien"	–	–	–	–
Episode 8 (April 3)	4	Renée^{8}	17	"Don’t Dream It’s Over"	✔	–	–	–
Episode 8 (April 3)	5	Connor^{9}	20	"For The First Time"	–	–	–	–
Episode 8 (April 3)	6	Wannes	25	"Heal"	–	–	–	–
Episode 8 (April 3)	7	Yasmina	29	"Can't Take My Eyes Off You"	✔	–	–	✔
Episode 8 (April 3)	8	Marson	26	"Give A Little Kindness"	–	–	–	✔
Episode 8 (April 3)	9	Britt	38	"Oh! Darling"	–	–	–	–
Episode 8 (April 3)	10	Maëlle^{10}	19	"Maybe"	✔	✔	✔	✔
Episode 8 (April 3)	11	Bente	18	"Pink Pony Club"	–	–	–	–
Episode 8 (April 3)	12	Rebecca	33	"Put Your Records On"	✔	✔	–	–

^1 Abigail previously competed on the seventh season of the kids version where she was coached by Metejoor until she was eliminated in the Knockouts.
^2 Hafsa and Zinneb, who both auditioned in the second episode, are sisters.
^3 Sofian previously competed on the sixth season of the kids version, where he was coached by Duncan Laurence. He was eliminated in the Knockouts, but returned the following season, coached by Metejoor, where he placed third.
^4 Ines previously competed on the seventh season of the kids version where she was coached by Laura Tesoro and placed fourth.
^5 Among the auditions, Zita Wauters surprised her dad, Koen Wauters, by auditioning to celebrate his 10th season as a coach, she did not participate in the competition.
^6 Liza previously competed on the fifth season of the kids version where she was coached by Sean Dhondt and was eliminated in the Semi-Final.
^7 After her audition, Charity performed on stage alongside her parents. Following the performance, Joost Klein invited her father, Johan, also known as the “Latin King of Suriname", to join his team. Johan accepted the invitation.
^8 Renee previously competed on the voice kids where she was coached by Duncan Lawrence and reached the knockouts.
^9 Connor previously competed on the fifth season of the kids version where he was coached by Laura Tesoro and was eliminated in the Knockouts.
^10 Maëlle previously competed on the fourth season of the kids version where she was coached by K3 and reached the top final.

== Big Battles ==
This season features a new round, the Big Battles. The coaches divide their artists into groups (duos, trios, or quartets) that compete for a spot in the next round. Each coach can decide to take one, several, or no artists through. After this round, six candidates remain per team creating a total of 24 artists advancing to the Cross Battles.

Coaches can send artists backstage, and make their decision at the end of the round.

Artists who were not chosen at the end of this round will have the chance to compete in "The Comeback Stage" if selected by the fifth coach Maarten & Dorothee.

Big Battles color keys
Artist immediately advanced to the Cross Battles
Artist was sent backstage but advanced to the Cross Battles
Artist was eliminated but was chosen to compete in the "Comeback Stage"
Artist was sent backstage and was eliminated in the final decision
Artist was immediately eliminated

Episode	Coach	Order	Winner(s)	Song	Loser(s)
Episode 9 (April 10)	Mathieu	1	Karry	"Creep"	Babs
Episode 9 (April 10)	Mathieu	1	Karry	"Creep"	Ruth
Episode 9 (April 10)	Koen	2	3 of a Kind	"Noodgeval"	—N/a
Episode 9 (April 10)	Koen	2	Niels	"Noodgeval"	—N/a
Episode 9 (April 10)	Joost	3	Silke	"How to Be a Heartbreaker"	Abigail
Episode 9 (April 10)	Joost	3	Silke	"How to Be a Heartbreaker"	Hanna
Episode 9 (April 10)	Laura	4	Liuwa	"Feeling Good"	Febe
Episode 9 (April 10)	Laura	4	Liuwa	"Feeling Good"	Jens
Episode 9 (April 10)	Laura	4	Liuwa	"Feeling Good"	Ricardo
Episode 9 (April 10)	Mathieu	5	Marson	"I Can't Make You Love Me"	Yasmiene
Episode 9 (April 10)	Mathieu	5	Marson	"I Can't Make You Love Me"	Doris
Episode 9 (April 10)	Joost	6	Maarten	"Iedereen is van de wereld"	Johan
Episode 9 (April 10)	Mathieu	7	Naz	"Linger"	Donatella
Episode 9 (April 10)	Mathieu	7	Naz	"Linger"	Lara
Episode 9 (April 10)	Laura	8	Hafsa	"So Easy (To Fall in Love)"	Jasmine
Episode 9 (April 10)	Laura	8	Hafsa	"So Easy (To Fall in Love)"	Noëlle
Episode 9 (April 10)	Koen	9	Ines	"Torn"	Lizabet
Episode 9 (April 10)	Koen	9	Ines	"Torn"	Renée
Episode 9 (April 10)	Koen	9	Ines	"Torn"	Yasmina
Episode 9 (April 10)	Laura	10	Yaro	"Mamma Mia"	Lina
Episode 9 (April 10)	Laura	10	Yaro	"Mamma Mia"	Marie-Hélène
Episode 9 (April 10)	Mathieu	11	Mike	"In the Stars"	Julie
Episode 9 (April 10)	Mathieu	11	Mike	"In the Stars"	Tobi
Episode 9 (April 10)	Joost	12	Giorgio^{1}	"Sarà perché ti amo"	—N/a
Episode 9 (April 10)	Joost	12	Michelle^{1}	"Sarà perché ti amo"	—N/a
Episode 10 (April 17)	Koen	1	Bas	"Next Summer"	Max
Episode 10 (April 17)	Laura	2	Aïcha	"Strange"	Mirte
Episode 10 (April 17)	Laura	2	Aïcha	"Strange"	Norah
Episode 10 (April 17)	Joost	3	—N/a	"Teenage Dirtbag"	Ibe
Episode 10 (April 17)	Joost	3	—N/a	"Teenage Dirtbag"	Matthew
Episode 10 (April 17)	Joost	3	—N/a	"Teenage Dirtbag"	Paulien
Episode 10 (April 17)	Koen	4	Wim	"Die with a Smile"	—N/a
Episode 10 (April 17)	Koen	4	Tokie	"Die with a Smile"	—N/a
Episode 10 (April 17)	Mathieu	5	Finn	"Do I Wanna Know?"	Justine
Episode 10 (April 17)	Mathieu	5	Liza	"Do I Wanna Know?"	Justine
Episode 10 (April 17)	Laura	6	Jeremy	"Boys Don't Cry"	—N/a
Episode 10 (April 17)	Laura	6	Joris	"Boys Don't Cry"	—N/a
Episode 10 (April 17)	Koen	7	—N/a	"Het midden"	Brecht
Episode 10 (April 17)	Koen	7	—N/a	"Het midden"	Vicky
Episode 10 (April 17)	Koen	7	—N/a	"Het midden"	Terry
Episode 10 (April 17)	Laura	8	—N/a	"Ain't No Mountain High Enough"	Sofian
Episode 10 (April 17)	Laura	8	—N/a	"Ain't No Mountain High Enough"	Jamaica
Episode 10 (April 17)	Joost	9	Maëlle	"Mon Amour"	Louise
Episode 10 (April 17)	Koen	10	—N/a	"9 Crimes"	Pieter
Episode 10 (April 17)	Koen	10	—N/a	"9 Crimes"	Tetiana
Episode 10 (April 17)	Joost	11	Sea	"Rumour Has It"	Jean
Episode 10 (April 17)	Joost	11	Rebecca	"Rumour Has It"	Jean

- ^1: Joost decided to take Giorgio and Michelle through as a duo.

== Cross Battles ==
The Cross Battles returned from last season. In this round, the coaches selected an artist from their team, then challenged a fellow coach to compete against, and this coach selected an artist as well. Due to the nature of the round, team sizes have the possibility to vary going into live shows as there are no quotas. The winner of each cross battle is determined by the two coaches not participating in the battle, together with seven former coaches: Natalia Druyts (season 9), Alex Callier (season 6), Bent Van Looy (season 4), Bart Peeters (season 6), Tourist LeMC (season 7), Axelle Red (season 3) and Jan Paternoster (season 9).

Artists who were not chosen at the end of this round will have the chance to compete in "The Comeback Stage" if selected by the fifth coach Maarten & Dorothee.

At the end of the round, five artists from Team Joost advanced, three from Teams Laura and Mathieu, and one from Team Koen.

Cross Battles color keys
Artist won the cross battle and advanced to the live shows
Artist was eliminated but was chosen to compete in the "Comeback Stage"
Artist lost the cross battle and was eliminated

Episode	Order	Challenger			Challenged		
Episode	Order	Coach	Song	Artist	Artist	Song	Coach
Episode 11 (April 24)	1	Koen Wauters	"Crazy"	Tokie	Mike	"Grace Kelly"	Mathieu Terryn
Episode 11 (April 24)	2	Joost Klein	"Oceaan"	Maarten	Yaro	"New Shoes"	Laura Tesoro
Episode 11 (April 24)	3	Mathieu Terryn	"Diamonds"	Marson	Bas	"Wicked Game"	Koen Wauters
Episode 11 (April 24)	4	Laura Tesoro	"Can't Pretend"	Joris	Liza	"Scream"	Mathieu Terryn
Episode 11 (April 24)	5	Joost Klein	"Bring Me to Life"	Silke	Ines	"Drunk in Love"	Koen Wauters
Episode 11 (April 24)	6	Mathieu Terryn	"Ağlama ben ağlarım"	Naz	Giorgio & Michelle	"Vivo per lei"	Joost Klein
Episode 12 (May 1)	1	Laura Tesoro	"Best Days"	Hafsa	Niels	"Ik Mis Je Zo"	Koen Wauters
Episode 12 (May 1)	2	Koen Wauters	"Street Spirit"	Wim	Aïcha	"Ain't Nobody"	Laura Tesoro
Episode 12 (May 1)	3	Laura Tesoro	"La Bohème"	Liuwa	Maëlle	"Rise Like a Phoenix"	Joost Klein
Episode 12 (May 1)	4	Koen Wauters	"Afterglow"	3 of a Kind	Sea	"We Don't Have to Take Our Clothes Off"	Joost Klein
Episode 12 (May 1)	5	Mathieu Terryn	"Dream On"	Karry	Jeremy	"Buwan"	Laura Tesoro
Episode 12 (May 1)	6	Joost Klein	"Free Your Mind"	Rebecca	Finn	"Bitter Sweet Symphony"	Mathieu Terryn

== The Comeback Stage ==
The show continued to feature "The Comeback Stage" where contestants who were eliminated from each round until the lives, had a chance to be chosen by this seasons new fifth coach's, Maarten & Dorothee. The winners of the Comeback Stage will compete in the main competition in the live shows.

=== Round 1: Sing-Offs ===
Maarten & Dorothee chose a maxiumum of two eliminated artists from each episode of the Blind Auditions, to compete in a sing-off. Only one artist from each sing-off will advance. However, they are also given a wild card to use once on an artist that lost the sing-off, creating a total of 7 artists advancing to the big battle rounds.

Artist won the Sing-Off and advanced to the battles
Artist was saved by a Wild Card
Artist lost the Sing-Off and was eliminated

Episode	Coach	Order	Artist	Song	Result
Episode 1 & 2 (February 13 & 20)	Maarten & Dorothee	1	Joke	"Creep"	Advanced
Episode 1 & 2 (February 13 & 20)	Maarten & Dorothee	2	Nore	"Ik Ben Bang"	Eliminated
Episode 2 & 3 (February 20 & 27)	Maarten & Dorothee	1	Zinneb	"Bad Romance"	Eliminated
Episode 2 & 3 (February 20 & 27)	Maarten & Dorothee	2	Amélie	"Lost Without You"	Advanced
Episode 4 (March 6)	Maarten & Dorothee	1	Noah	"Leave A Light On"	Eliminated
Episode 4 (March 6)	Maarten & Dorothee	2	Lore	"Meisjes Aan De Macht"	Advanced
Episode 5 & 6 (March 13 & 20)	Maarten & Dorothee	1	Sarah-Marie	"Proud Mary"	Advanced
Episode 5 & 6 (March 13 & 20)	Maarten & Dorothee	2	Bram	"Blinding Lights"	Eliminated
Episode 7 (March 27)	Maarten & Dorothee	1	Eleonora	"Als je alles weet"	Wild Card
Episode 7 (March 27)	Maarten & Dorothee	2	Charity	"Rise Up"	Advanced
Episode 8 (April 3)	Maarten & Dorothee	1	Timon	"Black Friday"	Advanced
Episode 8 (April 3)	Maarten & Dorothee	2	Wannes	"Big Love"	Eliminated

=== Round 2: Big Battles ===
Alongside the advancing artists from the sing-offs, Maarten & Dorothee took eliminated artists from the main Big Battles to join the comeback stage.

The artists are divided into groups (five or less) that compete for a spot in the next round. They can decide to take one, several, or no artists through.

Big Battles color keys
Artist advanced to the finale
Artist was eliminated

Episode	Coach	Order	Winner(s)	Song	Loser(s)
Episode 9 (April 10)	Maarten & Dorothee	1	Lore	"Tot Ie Weer Van Me Houdt"	Eleonora
Episode 9 (April 10)	Maarten & Dorothee	1	Lore	"Tot Ie Weer Van Me Houdt"	Sarah-Marie
Episode 9 (April 10)	Maarten & Dorothee	2	Timon	"I Will Come to You"	—N/a
Episode 9 (April 10)	Maarten & Dorothee	2	Marie-Hélène	"I Will Come to You"	—N/a
Episode 9 (April 10)	Maarten & Dorothee	2	Amélie	"I Will Come to You"	—N/a
Episode 10 (April 17)	Maarten & Dorothee	1	Lizabet	"Somebody to Love"	Ricardo
Episode 10 (April 17)	Maarten & Dorothee	1	Lizabet	"Somebody to Love"	Jens
Episode 10 (April 17)	Maarten & Dorothee	2	Charity	"Stop"	Joke
Episode 10 (April 17)	Maarten & Dorothee	2	Charity	"Stop"	Louise
Episode 10 (April 17)	Maarten & Dorothee	2	Abigail	"Stop"	Justine

=== Round 3: Finale ===
Maarten & Dorothee took eliminated artists from the main Cross Battles to join current comeback stage artists. Each artist then performs and the three artists chosen by Maarten & Dorothee will advance to the live shows.

Finale color keys
Artist immediately advanced to the finale
Artist advanced to the finale after Qmusic votes
Artist was eliminated after Qmusic votes
Artist was immediately eliminated

Episode	Coach	Order	Artist	Song	Result
Episode 11 (April 24)	Maarten & Dorothee	1	Liza	"Rock with You"	Eliminated
Episode 11 (April 24)	Maarten & Dorothee	2	Charity	"A Natural Woman"	Eliminated
Episode 11 (April 24)	Maarten & Dorothee	3	Timon	"Time Is Running Out"	Advanced
Episode 11 (April 24)	Maarten & Dorothee	4	Lizabet	"My Mind"	Eliminated
Episode 11 (April 24)	Maarten & Dorothee	5	Abigail	"Something's Got a Hold on Me"	Eliminated
Episode 11 (April 24)	Maarten & Dorothee	6	Giorgio & Michelle	"I Belong to You"	Eliminated
Episode 12 (May 1)	Maarten & Dorothee	1	Amélie	"Strong"	Advanced
Episode 12 (May 1)	Maarten & Dorothee	2	Niels	"Echte Liefde Is Te Koop"	Eliminated
Episode 12 (May 1)	Maarten & Dorothee	3	Marie-Hélène	"Unwritten"	Eliminated
Episode 12 (May 1)	Maarten & Dorothee	4	Liuwa	"Is It a Crime"	Eliminated
Episode 12 (May 1)	Maarten & Dorothee	5	Finn	"Impossible"	Advanced
Episode 12 (May 1)	Maarten & Dorothee	6	Lore	"Is Dit Nu Later"	Eliminated

== Live shows ==
Live shows color key
Artist was saved by public's vote
Artist was saved by their coach
Artist was saved by public's vote after not chosen by their coach
Artist was placed on the "Danger Bench" but advanced
Artist was placed on the "Danger Bench" and was eliminated
Artist was eliminated

=== Week 1: Top 15 (May 8) ===
The 12 contestants who advanced from the Cross Battles, along with the 3 contestants who advanced from The Comeback Stage, competed for a place in the next live show.

In this round, the Top 15 artists performed individually. Each coach selects one contestant from their team to advance directly to the next live show. With Koen only advancing one artist from the cross-battles, his artist, Bas Serra, automatically advanced to the Top 10. At the end of the broadcast, voting opened to the public, allowing viewers to vote among the remaining 10 contestants who were not selected by their coach.

At the conclusion of the show, the five contestants who received the highest number of public votes advanced to the next round, joining the five contestants who had already been selected by their coaches.

Top 15 Results
Episode	Coach	Order	Artist	Song	Result
Episode 13 (May 8)	Laura Tesoro	1	Aïcha Bangura	"Show Me Love"	Eliminated
Episode 13 (May 8)	Joost Klein	2	Silke Hamers	"Running Up That Hill"	Public's vote
Episode 13 (May 8)	Laura Tesoro	3	Joris Roosen	"That's Not How Dreams Are Made"	Public's vote
Episode 13 (May 8)	Mathieu Terryn	4	Karry	"I'd Rather Go Blind"	Eliminated
Episode 13 (May 8)	Laura Tesoro	5	Hafsa Senhadji	"Die on This Hill"	Laura's choice
Episode 13 (May 8)	Maarten & Dorothee	6	Finn van Damme	"The Borders"	Public's vote
Episode 13 (May 8)	Koen Wauters	7	Bas Serra	"What About Us"	Koen's choice
Episode 13 (May 8)	Joost Klein	8	Rebecca Haffner	"Dirty Diana"	Public's vote
Episode 13 (May 8)	Mathieu Terryn	9	Mike de Bock	"Your Song"	Public's vote
Episode 13 (May 8)	Joost Klein	10	Sea Munyaneza	"Cry Me a River"	Eliminated
Episode 13 (May 8)	Mathieu Terryn	11	Naz Cavusoglu	"American Teenager"	Mathieu's choice
Episode 13 (May 8)	Maarten & Dorothee	12	Timon Jansegers	"What Makes You Beautiful"	Maarten & Dorothee's choice
Episode 13 (May 8)	Maarten & Dorothee	13	Amélie Rollé	"Hometown Glory"	Eliminated
Episode 13 (May 8)	Joost Klein	14	Maarten Persoons	"Europapa"	Eliminated
Episode 13 (May 8)	Joost Klein	15	Maëlle Moquet	"Euphoria"	Joost's choice

=== Week 2: Top 10 (May 15) ===
The Live Top 10 performances featured the top 10 artists performing a solo song, while each team also performed a group number together. After all contestants had performed, viewers were able to vote for the artists they wanted to advance to the Top 7.

With the eliminations of Mike de Bock & Naz Cavusoglu, Mathieu Terryn no longer has any artists on his team.

Episode	Coach	Order	Artist	Song	Group song	Result
Episode 14 (May 15)	Maarten & Dorothee	2 (12)	Timon Jansegers	"The Loneliest"	"Don't Let the Sun Go Down on Me"	Eliminated
Episode 14 (May 15)	Laura Tesoro	3 (5)	Hafsa Senhadji	"Papaoutai"	"Say Something"	Public's vote
Episode 14 (May 15)	Mathieu Terryn	4 (9)	Naz Cavusoglu	"Green Light"	"Dream a Little Dream of Me"	Eliminated
Episode 14 (May 15)	Joost Klein	6 (1)	Rebecca Haffner	"Don't Stop Me Now"	"Pokémon Theme"	Public's vote
Episode 14 (May 15)	Mathieu Terryn	7 (9)	Mike de Bock	"You're Still the One"	"Dream a Little Dream of Me"	Eliminated
Episode 14 (May 15)	Koen Wauters	8 (15)	Bas Serra	"Anyone"	"Everybody"^{1}	Public's vote
Episode 14 (May 15)	Joost Klein	10 (1)	Silke Hamers	"Make Me Wanna Die"	"Pokémon Theme"	Public's vote
Episode 14 (May 15)	Joost Klein	11 (1)	Maëlle Moquet	"When We Were Young"	"Pokémon Theme"	Public's vote
Episode 14 (May 15)	Laura Tesoro	13 (5)	Joris Roosen	"Matilda"	"Say Something"	Public's vote
Episode 14 (May 15)	Maarten & Dorothee	14 (12)	Finn van Damme	"Fever Dream"	"Don't Let the Sun Go Down on Me"	Public's vote

- ^1: Since Bas Serra was the only member on Team Koen, his group performance was with 3 of a Kind, and Ines, who were both eliminated in the Cross-Battles

=== Week 3: Top 7 – Semi-final (May 22) ===
The Top 7 artists each performed a duet with their coach. Following the performances, voting opened to the public before being temporarily frozen, after which the three contestants with the fewest votes were placed on the "Danger Bench".

The contestants then returned to perform a solo song. At the end of the show, after all contestants had performed, voting reopened and viewers were once again able to cast their votes.

Voting closed several minutes later, with the votes from both voting rounds combined. At the conclusion of the show, the four contestants who received the highest number of public votes advanced to the final.

With the advancements of Maëlle Moquet and Finn van Damme, Joost Klein and Maarten & Dorothee became the eighth and ninth new coaches to successfully bring their team to the finale after Bent Van Looy (Tom De Man in season 3), Axelle Red (Koen en Jo Smets in season 3), Regi Penxten (Dunja Meesin in season 3), Bart Peeters (Jan Van De Ven in season 4), Niels Destadsbader (Nanou Nys in season 7), Mathieu Terryn (Evert Dirckx and Yente De Saedeleer in season 8) and Jan Paternoster (Wesley Ngoto in season 8).

Episode	Coach	Order	Artist	Duet with coach	Song	Result
Episode 15 (May 22)	Laura Tesoro	1 (8)	Joris Roosen	"Face Myself"	"Bird Gerhl"	Public's vote
Episode 15 (May 22)	Joost Klein	2 (9)	Rebecca Haffner	"Could You Be Loved"	"GoldenEye"	Eliminated
Episode 15 (May 22)	Koen Wauters	3 (10)	Bas Serra	"Be Alright"	"I Lost a Friend"	Public's vote
Episode 15 (May 22)	Joost Klein	4 (11)	Maëlle Moquet	"Une Belle Histoire"	"One Night Only"	Public's vote
Episode 15 (May 22)	Laura Tesoro	5 (13)	Hafsa Senhadji	"iloveitiloveitiloveit"	"Team"	Eliminated
Episode 15 (May 22)	Maarten & Dorothee	6 (12)	Finn van Damme	"Come Together" / "Lose Yourself" (with Maarten)	"Let It Go"	Public's vote
Episode 15 (May 22)	Joost Klein	7 (14)	Silke Hamers	"Luchtballon"	"Praying"	Eliminated

=== Week 4: Finale (May 29) ===
The public voting opened at the start of the show. Each finalist performed a new solo song, and a song the previously performed in the competition before voting was temporarily frozen. The two contestants with the highest number of viewer votes advanced to the final round, while the remaining two contestants were eliminated.

Voting then reopened, with previous votes continuing to count. The Top 2 finalists each performed one final song before the voting lines closed. The contestant with the highest number of viewer votes was crowned the winner of the competition.

This was the first season since the sixth that no coach had more than one artist representing their team in the finale. Additionally, it was the second occasion on which a comeback coach guided an artist to the finale.

Bas Serra was named the winner of this season, marking Koen Wauters' third win as a coach. Serra became the first artist to be the sole remaining member of their team commencing the live shows and subsequently advance to the finale.

Finale Results
Coach	Artist	Phase 1				Phase 2		Results
Coach	Artist	Order	Song	Order	Past song	Order	Song	Results
Maarten & Dorothee	Finn van Damme	1	"I'll Be Waiting"	7	"Impossible"	Eliminated in Phase 1		Fourth place
Joost Klein	Maëlle Moquet	6	"Never Tear Us Apart"	2	"Mon amour"^{1}	10	"Impossible"	Runner-up
Laura Tesoro	Joris Roosen	3	"All by Myself"	5	"Hallelujah"	Eliminated in Phase 1		Third place
Koen Wauters	Bas Serra	8	"Another Love"	4	"the grudge"	9	"Sign of the Times"	Winner

Non-competition performances
Order	Performers	Song
16.1	Walter Grootaers and the top four finalists	"Dancing with Myself"
16.2	Dotan and the top four finalists	"Home"
16.3	Dotan	"Let You Go"

^1 During Maëlle Moquet’s performance, her microphone stopped working. She was provided with a replacement mic and continued performing. However, after her performance, she was allowed to perform again to ensure the competition remained fair.

== Elimination chart ==
Results color key
Winner	Saved by the public
Runner-up	Saved by their coach
Third place	Saved by the public after not chosen by their coach
Fourth place	Eliminated

Coaches color key
Team Koen
Team Joost
Team Laura
Team Mathieu
Team Maarten & Dorothee

=== Overall ===
Live shows' results per week
Artists	Week 1	Week 2	Week 3	Week 4 Finale	
Artists	Week 1	Week 2	Week 3	Phase 1	Phase 2
Bas Serra	Safe	Safe	Safe	Safe	Winner
Maëlle Moquet	Safe	Safe	Safe	Safe	Runner-up
Finn van Damme	Safe	Safe	Safe	3rd place	Eliminated (Phase 1)
Joris Roosen	Safe	Safe	Safe	4th place	Eliminated (Phase 1)
Hafsa Senhadji	Safe	Safe	Eliminated	Eliminated (Week 3)	
Rebecca Haffner	Safe	Safe	Eliminated	Eliminated (Week 3)	
Silke Hamers	Safe	Safe	Eliminated	Eliminated (Week 3)	
Mike de Bock	Safe	Eliminated	Eliminated (Week 2)		
Naz Cavusoglu	Safe	Eliminated	Eliminated (Week 2)		
Timon Jansegers	Safe	Eliminated	Eliminated (Week 2)		
Aïcha Bangura	Eliminated	Eliminated (Week 1)			
Amélie Rollé	Eliminated	Eliminated (Week 1)			
Karry	Eliminated	Eliminated (Week 1)			
Maarten Persoons	Eliminated	Eliminated (Week 1)			
Sea Munyaneza	Eliminated	Eliminated (Week 1)			

=== Per team ===
Live shows' results per week
Artists	Week 1	Week 2	Week 3	Week 4 Finale	
Artists	Week 1	Week 2	Week 3	Phase 1	Phase 2
Bas Serra	Safe	Safe	Safe	Safe	Winner
Maëlle Moquet	Safe	Safe	Safe	Safe	Runner-up
Rebecca Haffner	Safe	Safe	Eliminated		
Silke Hamers	Safe	Safe	Eliminated		
Maarten Persoons	Eliminated				
Sea Munyaneza	Eliminated				
Joris Roosen	Safe	Safe	Safe	3rd place	
Hafsa Senhadji	Safe	Safe	Eliminated		
Aïcha Bangura	Eliminated				
Mike de Bock	Safe	Eliminated			
Naz Cavusoglu	Safe	Eliminated			
Karry	Eliminated				
Finn van Damme	Safe	Safe	Safe	4th place	
Timon Jansegers	Safe	Eliminated			
Amélie Rollé	Eliminated				
