= Unity (Joost Klein album) =

Studio album by Joost
- Released: 21 February 2025
- Genre: Gabberpop; Eurodance
- Length: 36:20
- Language: Dutch, English, German
- Producer: Tantu Beats; 22ghosts; Dylan Van Dael; Paul Elstak; Flansie; Onzekere Guy; Spinvis; Sunnysoposted; Thijmen Melissant; Used; vieze asbak

Joost chronology
Fryslân (2022)	Unity (2025)	Kleinkunst (2026)

Singles from Unity
- 1. "Friesenjung" Released: 25 May 2023; 2. "Europapa" Released: 29 February 2024; 3. "Luchtballon" Released: 4 June 2024; 4. "Filthy Dog" Released: 3 October 2024; 5. "Why Not???" Released: 30 January 2025

Unity is the ninth studio album by Dutch musician Joost Klein. It was self-released in February 2025. Unity is Joost's first major project since his participation as the Dutch representative in the Eurovision Song Contest 2024, from which he was disqualified for "unlawful threats."

== Background and writing ==
Joost Klein was selected to represent the Netherlands in the Eurovision Song Contest 2024 by AVROTROS in December 2023, with his song "Europapa" premiered the following February. During the competition, the Netherlands proceeded to the final, but was disqualified by the European Broadcasting Union (EBU) due to an off-stage incident involving Klein. Several tracks on Unity make references to the affair, including lyrics disparaging Eurovision organizers and the EBU.

In August 2024, Klein announced he was working on a new album on Instagram following his performance at Sziget Festival. Unity was preceded by three singles after its announcement: "Luchtballon" in June 2024, "Filthy Dog" in October, and "Why Not???" in January 2025. Several Unity tracks were debuted during Klein's European tours following Eurovision.

== Reception ==
Unity was positively received. Gijsbert Room, writing for De Volkskrant, awarded the album four stars out of five, describing it both as disruptive and uplifting. A NPO 3FM writer highlighted its themes of unity and its several featured musicians. Bryan Boomaars, a writer for online Dutch outlet Dansende Beren, underlines that Klein's frustrations with the EBU was the album's primary theme. US music reviewer Anthony Fantano criticized Klein's humorous tone as not "quite as sharp or as layered as it could be."

== Track listing ==
All tracks are written by Joost Klein, unless specified.

Unity track listing
No.	Title	Writer(s)	Length
1.	"Why Not???"		2:37
2.	"Luchtballon"	Klein; Richard Marx; Stuntje	2:16
3.	"Gabberland"		2:38
4.	"1" (featuring Scooter)		3:20
5.	"United by Music" (featuring Tommy Cash)	Klein; Scooter; Andrew Dost; Jack Antonoff; Jeff Bhasker; Nathaniel Ruess	1:48
6.	"Discozwemmen" (featuring Spinvis)	Klein; Spinvis	2:46
7.	"Friesenjung" (featuring Ski Aggu and Otto Waalkes)	Gordon Sumner; Waalkes	2:26
8.	"Kunst und Musik"	Klein; Alexander Patrick Nuttgens; Michael John Scott; Steven Fawkes; Teun de Kruif	2:16
9.	"Filthy Dog"		1:55
10.	"We'll Meet Again" (featuring Stuntje)	Klein; Christiaan Martin Boer; Gerardus W.C. Bobby Boer; René Carolito Philips	2:31
11.	"BOOM BOOM!!!!!!"		1:57
12.	"Internetcafe 24/7"		2:48
13.	"Epiphany of Love: The Origin" (featuring Jungle Bobby and aldo2swag)		0:29
14.	"Europapa"	Klein; Maradonnie; Paul Elstak; Thijmen Melissant; Tim Haars	2:40
15.	"Europapa - Outro"	Klein; Dylan van Dael; Teun de Kruif	1:07
16.	"Last Man Standing"		2:46
Total length:			36:20

Notes

- "Luchtballon" samples from "Right Here Waiting" by Richard Marx.
- "1" samples from "We Are Young" by Fun.
- "Discozwemmen" interpolates "Ik wil alleen maar zwemmen" by Spinvis.
- "We'll Meet Again" samples "Come Take My Hand" by 2 Brothers on the 4th Floor.

== Personnel ==
Credits adapted from Tidal.

- Joost Klein – vocals
- Benjamin Klassen – guitar (1)

Technical personnel

- Tantu Beats – producer (1–6, 8–16)
- Thijmen Melissant – producer (2, 11)
- Used – producer (3)
- vieze asbak – producer (3, 11)
- Spinvis – producer (6)
- Sunnysoposted – producer (9)
- Flansie – producer (10, 16)
- 22ghosts – producer (12)
- Onzekere Guy – producer (13)
- Paul Elstak – producer (14)
- Dylan van Dael – producer (15)

== Charts ==
Chart performance for Unity
Chart	Peak position
Belgian Albums (Ultratop Flanders)	18
Dutch Albums (Album Top 100)	16
Finnish Albums (Suomen virallinen lista)	36
