= Brunzyn =

Dutch rapper (born 1998)

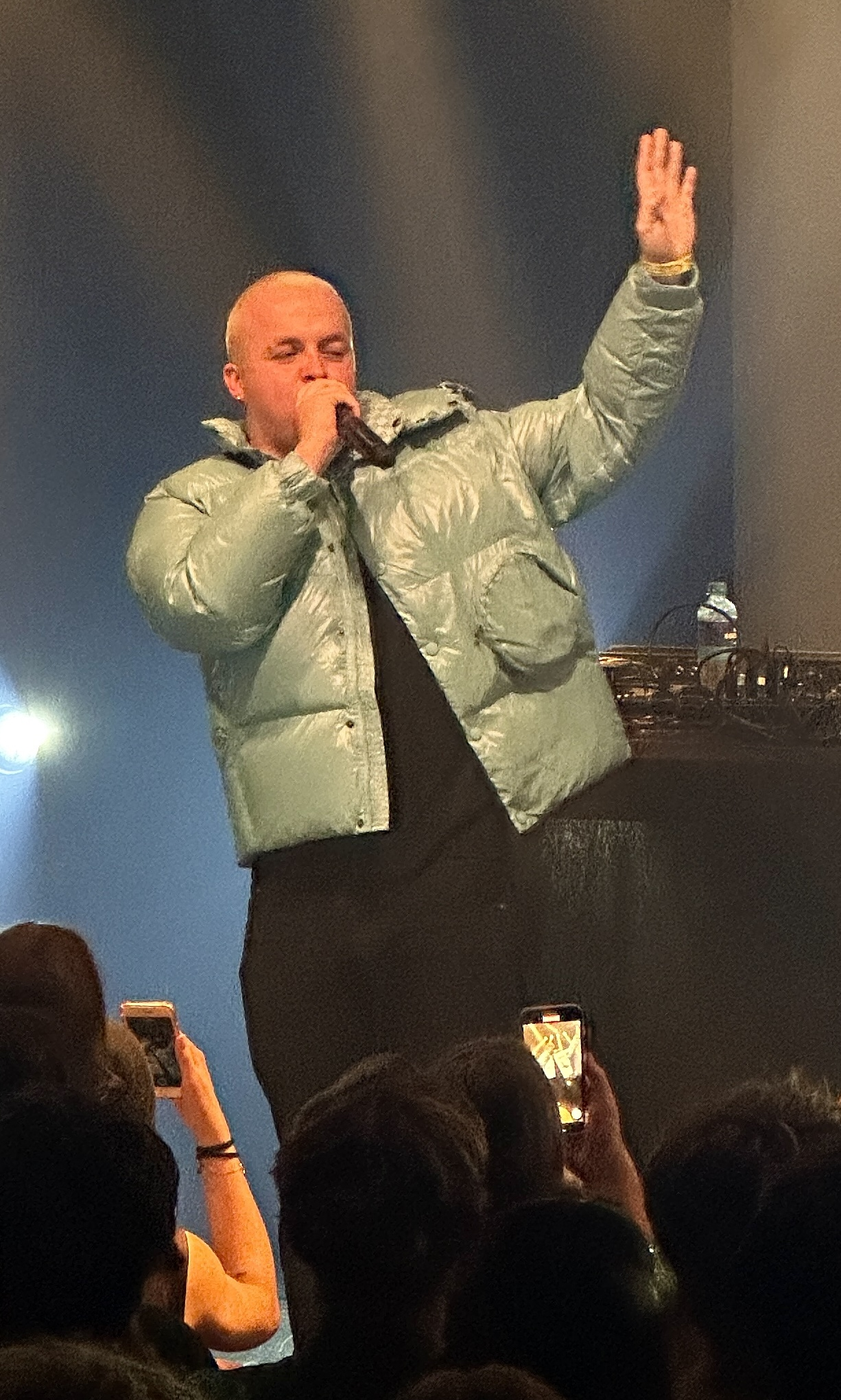

Background information
- Born: Bruno van Dingen; 14 January 1998 (age 28); Vlaardingen, Netherlands
- Genre: Hip hop
- Occupation: Rapper
- Label: Albino Sports

Bruno van Dingen (born 14 January 1998), known professionally as Brunzyn, is a Dutch rapper from Vlaardingen. His stage name comes from both footballer Hidde ter Avest and a classmate, who independently gave him the nickname.

== Early life and education ==
Van Dingen was born in Vlaardingen on 14 January 1998. He attended the Stedelijk Gymnasium Schiedam for five years, after which he switched to HAVO. After briefly studying journalism in Utrecht and communications in Rotterdam, he started a history teacher training course.

== Career ==
In 2019, Brunzyn signed a contract with rapper Joost Klein's record label Albino Sports. It was here that he released the mixtape “Albino Sports, Vol. 1” out. The tape features collaborations with Donnie, Bokoedro and Nelcon, among others. Brunzyn subsequently became vice-chairman of Albino Sports.

In 2021, Van Dingen released two tracks with Joost, namely Vrijdag Goed (feat. Donnie) and Albino Sports Anthem. In 2023, he performed at Eurosonic Noorderslag and was a guest in 101Barz.

== Discography ==
=== Albums ===
Title	Release date
Dingen Van Bruno	23-04-2018
3134	28-11-2018
BrunStyn	21-07-2019
Brunzun!	25-10-2019
B	05-06-2020
Albino Sports, Vol. 1	1-04-2021
B2	26-11-2021

=== Singles ===
Title	Release date
Fuckboy	29-08-2018
Represent	24-09-2018
Racen	14-03-2019
Lets Go Brunzyn	17-06-2019
Brun$ensei	10-07-2019
Klaar!	18-10-2019
Jaloers	23-10-2019
Allerdomste Tatta	27-12-2019
Swift16	07-02-2020
Brunzyn de Underdog	03-04-2020
Barz	06-05-2020
Bootleg & Go Crasy!	30-10-2020
Gewoon Goed	05-02-2021
Albino Sports Anthem	26-03-2021
Back2Back	15-09-2021
Anders	01-07-2022
Gent Freestyle	24-03-2023
