= Kleinkunst (album) =

Studio album by Joost
- Released: 1 January 2026
- Genres: Gabberpop; happy hardcore; Eurotrance
- Length: 56:00
- Languages: Dutch; English; German
- Producers: Vieze Asbak; Max Crebolder; Ctjenulvijf; Mark Ćwiertnia; I'm DMA; iPadKid2001; Thijmen Melissant; Novation Supernova 2 Pro X; Gladde Paling; Sekko; Arie Storm; Tantu Beats; Used; Dylan van Dael

Joost chronology
Unity (2025)	Kleinkunst (2026)	Dutch Hardcore (2026)

Kleinkunst is the tenth studio album by Dutch musician Joost Klein. It was self-released on 1 January 2026.

== Background ==
Kleinkunst was announced for 31 December 2025, and released a day later on New Year's Day. The album was released in the lead-up to Klein's 2026 world tour, which will include performances in South America and the American festival Coachella.

== Production ==
The production of Kleinkunst was largely handled by Tantu Beats and mainly contains influences from gabber, happy hardcore and Eurotrance. The song 'Zonder Jou' has been described as a combination of gabber and rock. Due to its international success and upcoming world tour, the album contains more English lyrics and references to the Spanish-speaking world than before. On the album, Klein collaborates with various national and international artists. A notable contribution comes from singer Anouk on the song 'Zonder Jou', in which she sings the chorus. Other guest artists include German singer Mark Forster, German DJ HorsegiirL, Mr. Polska, rapper ADF Samski, Gladde Paling, Vieze Asbak and painter Daan Koens.

== Reception ==
Reviewers reacted to the album in a mixed way. NRC described Kleinkunst as more energetic and cheerful than Klein's previous work, but criticized the playing time and parts that were perceived as less substantive. De Morgen and de Volkskrant were also critical of the album's length. They stated that the lack of selection was detrimental to its cohesion and that the album would have benefited from more moments of calm. Both newspapers rated the album three out of five stars. The Leeuwarder Courant was more positive and awarded the album four stars, although the length was also mentioned as a drawback.

In the week of its release, Kleinkunst reached fourth place in the worldwide chart for new albums on streaming service Spotify.

== Track listing ==
Kleinkunst track listing
No.	Title	Writer(s)	Producer(s)	Length
1.	"Capitalism :D"	Joost Klein; Teun de Kruif; Thijmen Melissant	Tantu Beats; Melissant	2:43
2.	"Shanghai Night"	Klein; De Kruif; Christophe Doprolis; Wessel Okkes	Tantu Beats; Ctjenulvijf	2:23
3.	"Farmcore" (with HorsegiirL)	Klein; De Kruif; HorsegiirL	Tantu Beats	3:27
4.	"Medellín" (with MCR-T)	Klein; De Kruif; MCR-T	Tantu Beats	2:28
5.	"Coachella"	Klein; De Kruif	Tantu Beats	2:58
6.	"Hardcore Junkie" (with Daan Koens)	Klein; De Kruif; Daan Koens		1:48
7.	"Tetetetete (Español)"	Klein; Max Crebolder	Tantu Beats; Crebolder	2:43
8.	"Latin Gabber" (featuring Vieze Asbak)	Klein; De Kruif	Tantu Beats; Vieze Asbak	1:36
9.	"Hackers Theme"	Klein; De Kruif; Jo Eelen	Tantu Beats; Used	1:32
10.	"Enjoy the Ride" (featuring Gladde Paling)	Klein; De Kruif; Gladde Paling	Tantu Beats; Paling	2:38
11.	"Funny Onion Song" (featuring Internetcafe247)	Dell Dimension 4100	Novation Supernova 2 Pro X	1:45
12.	"Wtffff :P" (with I'm DMA)	Klein; De Kruif; Dmitrii Voskresenskii	Tantu Beats; I'm DMA	2:30
13.	"Jailbreak Life" (with Jailbreak iPhone Now)	Klein; Mr Jailbreak	Tantu Beats; iPadKid2001	1:51
14.	"Ansichtkaart"	Klein; De Kruif; Doprolis	Tantu Beats; Ctjenulvijf	2:17
15.	"Zonder Jou" (with Anouk)	Klein; De Kruif; Arie Storm; Anouk Teeuwe	Tantu Beats; Storm	2:45
16.	"Full Circle" (with Mark Forster)	Klein; Mark Ćwiertnia	Tantu Beats; Ćwiertnia; Dylan van Dael	1:35
17.	"Joost Klein 5"	Klein; De Kruif	Tantu Beats	1:35
18.	"Everyday (Everyday)"	Klein; De Kruif	Tantu Beats	1:47
19.	"Panchiii" (with ADF Samski)	Klein; James M. Franks; Samir Plasschaert	Tantu Beats; Melissant	2:13
20.	"Break the Law" (with Mr. Polska)	Klein; Dominik Czajka	Tantu Beats; Paling	2:42
21.	"Radio"	Klein; De Kruif; Doprolis	Tantu Beats; Ctjenulvijf	2:24
22.	"Holanda NL"	Klein; De Kruif; Doprolis	Tantu Beats; Ctjenulvijf	2:16
23.	"Klikobak"	Klein; De Kruif; Okkes	Tantu Beats; Sekko	2:02
24.	"Rooftop Freestyle" (with DJ Lucas)	Klein; Lucas White Kendall	Tantu Beats; Paling	2:02
Total length:				56:00
