= Trafik! =

2024 song by Käärijä and Joost Klein

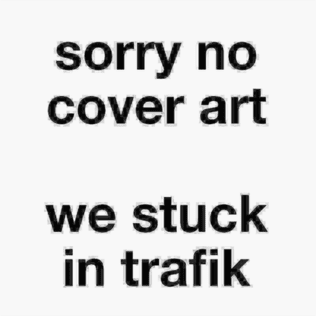

Single by Käärijä and Joost Klein
- Released: 12 July 2024
- Genre: Trap; hardstyle
- Length: 2:12
- Songwriters: Aleksi Nurmi; Jere Pöyhönen; Johannes Naukkarinen; Joost Klein; Teun de Kruif
- Producers: Aleksi Nurmi; Johannes Naukkarinen; Teun de Kruif

Käärijä singles chronology
"Kot Kot" (2024)	"Trafik!" (2024)	"Sex = Money" (2024)

Joost Klein singles chronology
"The Bird Song" (2024)	"Trafik!" (2024)	"Filthy Dog" (2024)

Music video
- "Trafik!" on YouTube

"Trafik!" is a song by Finnish rapper Käärijä and Dutch musician Joost Klein. The song was released on 12 July 2024 by Warner Music Finland.

== Background and composition ==
"Trafik!" was written by Käärijä and Joost Klein alongside Aleksi Nurmi, Johannes "Kiro" Naukkarinen, and Teun de Kruif. The latter of the three also produced the song. The song is described as a summer anthem about being stuck in a traffic jam. It creates an energetic interplay between the two artists, seeming to be a competition "to add the most random sounds until a full-fledged song is created". According to Käärijä, they wrote the song when Joost Klein and his team had a trip to Finland to meet after Klein sent a message on Instagram to collaborate.

== Release ==
The song was released on all music streaming services on 12 July 2024, with the music video uploaded on Klein's YouTube channel the following day. The music video was directed by Lyon Pol and produced by Whale, while Ezra Xenos was the executive producer. Before the release, the song was performed by Käärijä and Klein at Ruisrock when the latter made a guest appearance.

== Reception ==
Writing for the magazine Melomaniacs, Mandy Huibregtsen stated that the song makes for an "extremely iconic collaboration" between Käärijä and Klein which are "known for their unique style". She added that the song, being only over two minutes, "makes it perfect to put on repeat and just jump around to."

== Credits and personnel ==
- Aleksi Nurmi – composer, arranger, songwriter, producer
- Johannes Naukkarinen – composer, arranger, lyricist, producer
- Teun de Kruif – composer, arranger, lyricist, producer
- Jere Pöyhönen – lyricist, composer
- Joost Klein – lyricist, composer
- Kalle Keskikuru – mixing engineer
- Svante Forsbäck – mastering engineer

== Charts ==
Chart performance for "Trafik!"
Chart (2024)	Peak position
Finland (Suomen virallinen lista)	5
Lithuania (AGATA)	60
Netherlands (Single Top 100)	84

== Release history ==
Release dates and formats for "Trafik!"
Region	Date	Format(s)	Version	Label	Ref.
Various	12 July 2024	Digital download; streaming	Single	Warner Music Finland	
