= Joost Klein =

Dutch musician (born 1997)

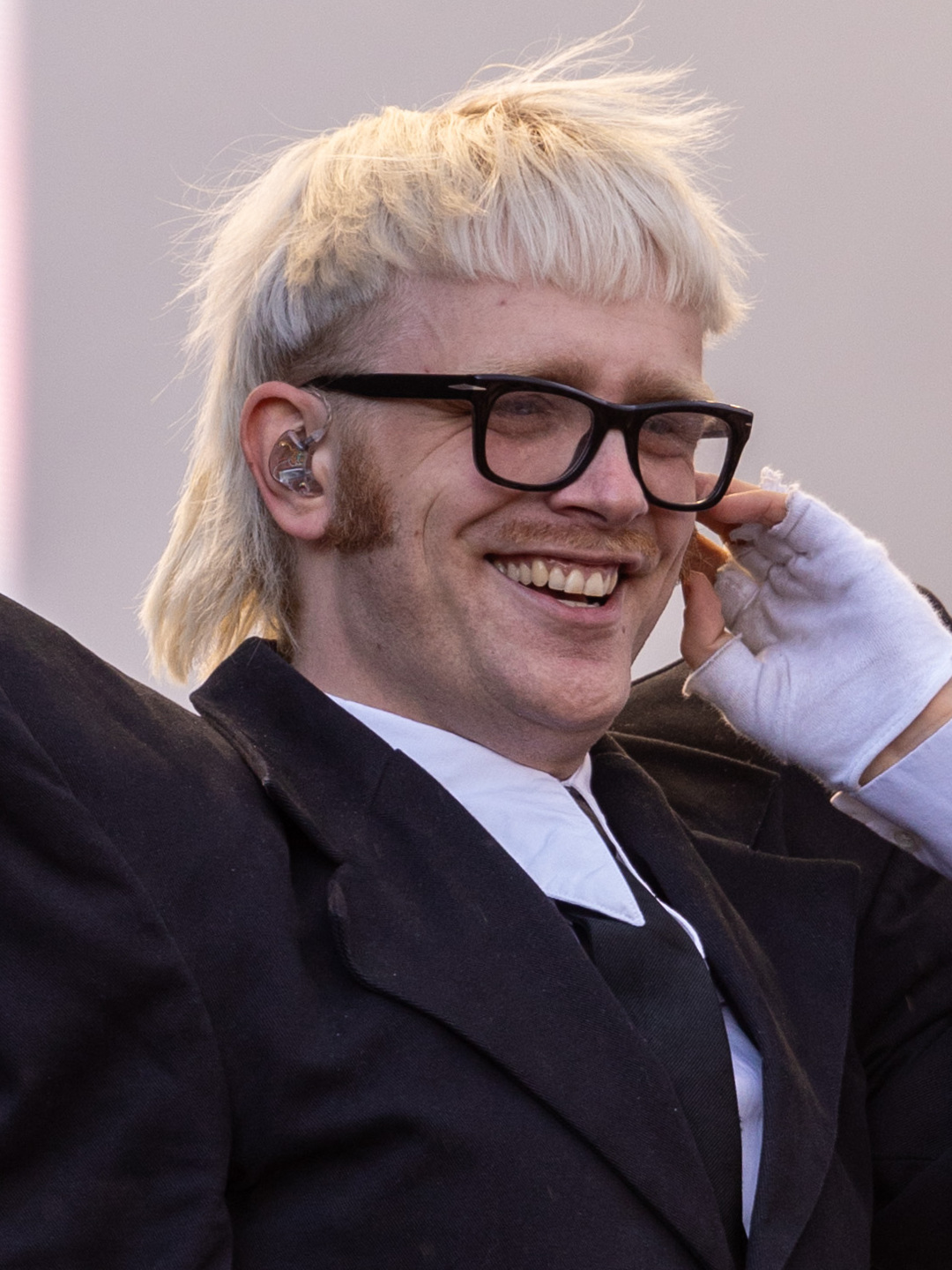
- Klein in 2024

Background information
- Also known as: Joost, Eenhoornjoost
- Born: 10 November 1997 (age 29); Leeuwarden, Netherlands
- Genres: Hip-hop; electronic; indie rock; gabber; hyperpop
- Occupations: Musician; Producer; Rapper; Singer
- Years active: 2016–present
- Labels: TopNotch; Albino Sports; Made; Joost Klein
- Website: joostklein.eu

TikTok information
- Page: joost
- Years active: 2021–present
- Followers: 4.6M

YouTube information
- Channel: joost klein
- Years active: 2010–present
- Subscribers: 780k
- Views: 190,266,124 (September 2026)
- Last updated: 4 September 2026

Joost Klein (Dutch pronunciation: [joːst klɛin]; born 10 November 1997), also known mononymously as Joost or eenhoornjoost (lit. Unicorn Joost), is a Dutch musician, rapper, singer, and former YouTuber. Mainly a hip hop artist, his songs and performances often include influences of electronic music, such as drum and bass, hardstyle, hyperpop, and gabber. He has released ten studio albums, two of which reached the top ten of the Dutch Album Top 100. He has amassed four chart entries on the Dutch Top 40, and is best known for the songs "Wachtmuziek" (2022), "Friesenjung" (2023, with Ski Aggu and Otto Waalkes), and "Europapa" (2024).

"Europapa" was selected to represent the Netherlands in the Eurovision Song Contest 2024 and subsequently became Klein's first song to top both the Dutch Top 40 and Single Top 100. Having qualified in second place from the second semi-final, he was scheduled to perform fifth in the final, but was abruptly disqualified from the competition by the European Broadcasting Union due to allegations of misconduct. These were investigated by Swedish prosecutors, who dropped the case in August 2024 after concluding that they could not prove any criminal conduct. Klein has continued releasing music following the success of "Europapa", joined the tenth season of The Voice van Vlaanderen as a coach, and is embarking on his first international concert tour in 2026.

== Early life ==
Joost Klein was born on 10 November 1997 in Leeuwarden, Netherlands, and grew up in the nearby village of Britsum. In 2010, he started a YouTube channel under the name EenhoornJoost (lit. 'UnicornJoost'). He did not complete the curriculum at his secondary school. When he was thirteen, his father died of cancer, and a year later, in 2011, his mother died of cardiac arrest. Following the death of his parents, Klein was looked after by his older brother and his sister.

== Career ==
=== 2016–2022: First releases ===
While active as a YouTuber, Klein published videos ranging from sketches to mini-documentaries. In 2016, he released his debut EP Dakloos (transl. 'Homeless'), after which he began focusing on a career in music. "Bitches", produced by Mick Spek, was his first music video to reach one million views on YouTube. He was briefly signed to TopNotch in 2017 and 2018, but eventually decided to set up his own record label, Albino Sports.

On 20 October 2017, Klein released the mixtape Scandinavian Boy, followed by the singles "Meeuw" (transl. 'Seagull') and "Ome Robert" (transl. 'Uncle Robert') in 2018. On 3 August 2018, Klein released the studio album M van Marketing together with Dutch rapper Donnie. To promote the album, the duo organised a one-time concert titled Viraal in Carré in the Royal Theater Carré in Amsterdam.

Klein published a small book of poems titled Albino on 14 November 2018. Klein has mentioned that he wrote the book because of his father, who had also written a book and encouraged him to do the same. To promote his studio album of the same title, Klein organised the Het gaat niet zo goed (transl. 'It is not going too well') concert tour in 2019, during which he visited venues such as Paard, De Oosterpoort, Doornroosje and Paradiso. He concluded the tour in Paradiso on 3 March 2019. The following summer, Klein performed at major Benelux festivals such as Pukkelpop, Pinkpop, Lowlands, and Zwarte Cross.

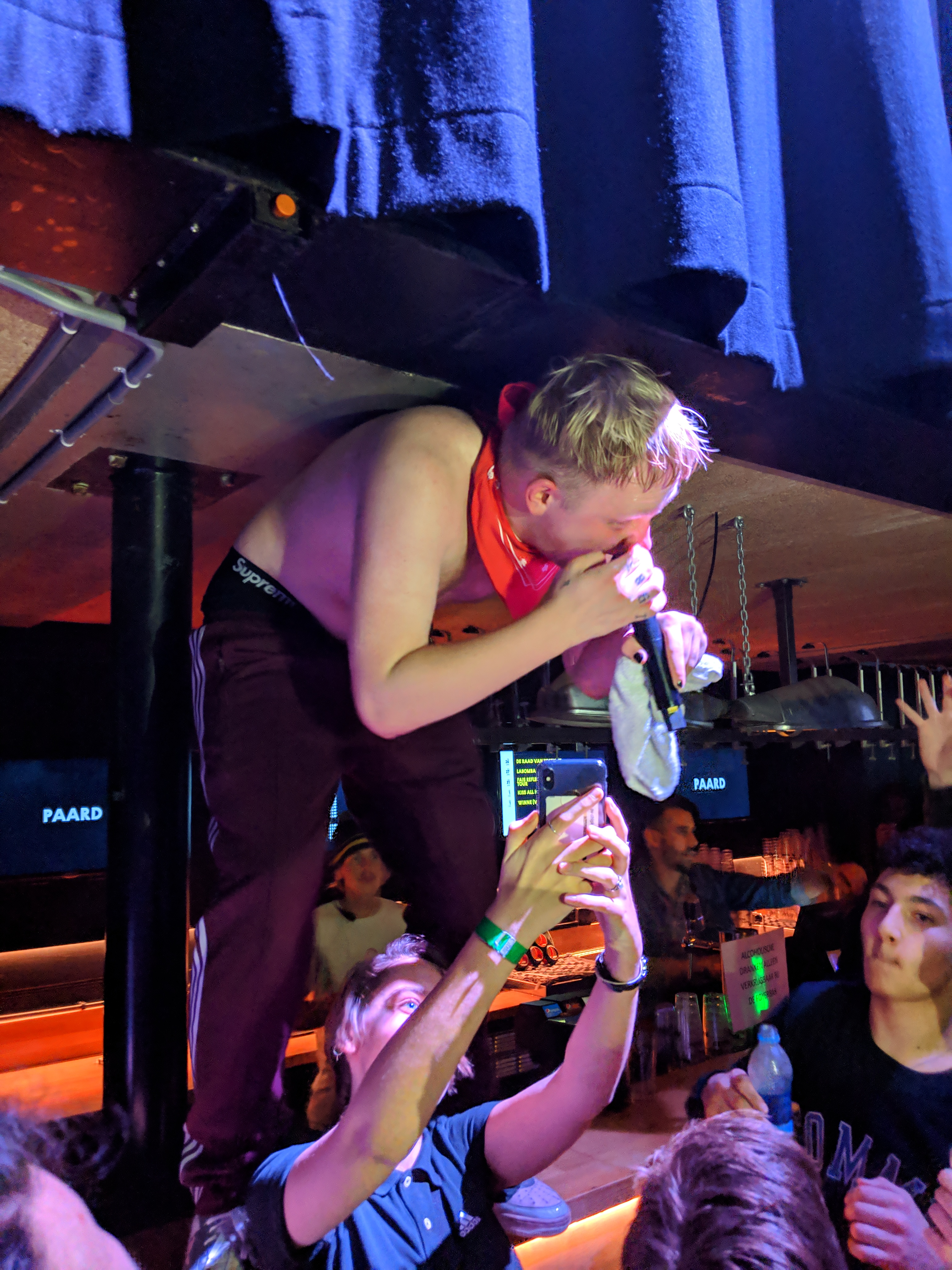
Klein performing in 2019

On 15 November 2019, Klein released the album 1983, the title of which refers to the birth year of Klein's older brother. Klein collaborated with music producers Mick Spek, Kauwboy and Tantu Beats on the album. On 24 April 2020, Klein released the album Joost Klein 7, which consists of seven songs, including a collaboration with Canadian rapper bbno$. On 7 August of the same year, he released the single "Ik wil je" (transl. 'I want you'), a remix of the eponymous song by the Belgian band De Kreuners. In 2021 he created a song with Studio Brussel named "Fok De Blok".

In March 2022, Klein collaborated with Russian musician CMH on "Jackass", in which Klein sings about his love for Russian women. In February 2023, he released "Normalje Bass" with Saint Petersburg-based group Russian Village Boys. According to a statement released by Klein's management, "Jackass" was recorded prior to the Russian invasion of Ukraine, and the collaboration with the Russian Village Boys was done after the group had left their homeland following the invasion, noting that "it has absolutely no bearing on what terrible things are still happening there, and is not pro-Russian".

Klein released his eighth studio album on 13 September 2022, titled Fryslân after his home province of Friesland. The album features the singles "Florida 2009", "Wachtmuziek" and "Papa en mama", and was fully produced by Tantu Beats. Various samples can be heard on the album, including Doe Maar and Crazy Frog. In "Florida 2009", Klein reflects on the death of his parents. He premiered the song at the 2022 edition of Pinkpop. "Droom Groot" was also released as a single in August the following year, following the release of single "Bruder + Schwester" with Gladde Paling, with whom he had also collaborated on Fryslân.

=== 2023–2025: Eurovision Song Contest and subsequent work ===
In 2023, Klein scored his first hit in Germany with the single "Friesenjung", a collaboration with Ski Aggu and an adaptation of a song by Otto Waalkes. The song reached first place on the German Single Top 100. That same year, Klein expressed his interest in representing the Netherlands in the Eurovision Song Contest 2024. A petition was launched by the NPO 3FM radio programme VoorAan of PowNed in an attempt to realise this goal. On 11 December 2023, Dutch broadcaster AVROTROS announced that Klein had been selected as the Dutch representative for the contest. His entry, titled "Europapa", was released on 29 February 2024.

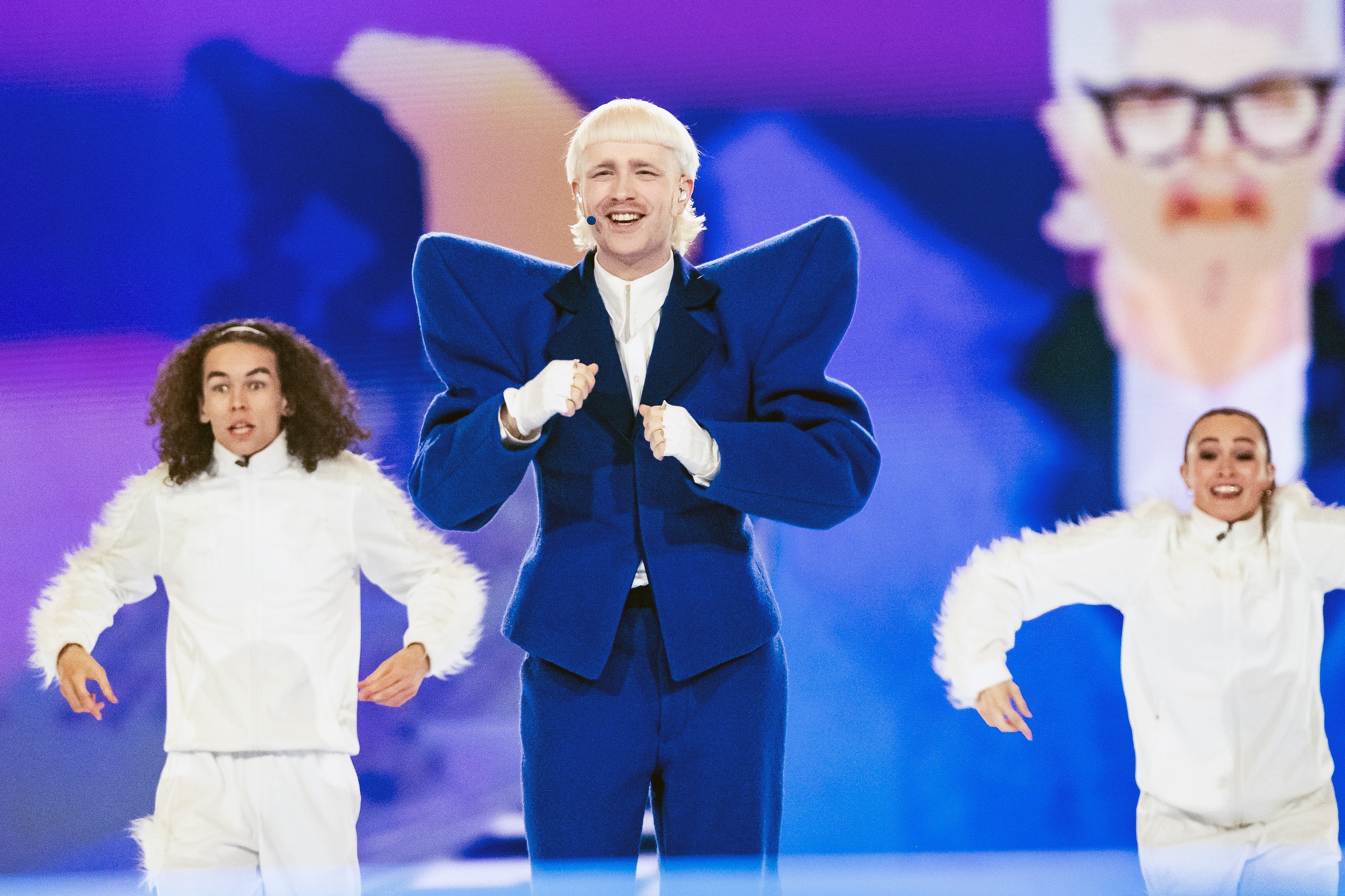
Klein performing "Europapa" at the second semi-final of the Eurovision Song Contest 2024

Klein performed in the second semi-final of the Eurovision Song Contest 2024 on 9 May, and having qualified, was scheduled to perform in position 5 in the final on 11 May. However, Klein was barred from further rehearsals due to an "incident". On the day of the final, the European Broadcasting Union (EBU) announced that Klein had been disqualified. According to AVROTROS, Klein was recorded by a female camera operator against his will immediately following his semi-final performance. AVROTROS claims that she continued to film "against clearly made agreements". The camera operator alleges that Klein had reacted to the recording by making a "threatening move" towards her holding a camera. The details of the altercation are unclear, but the Swedish police said it would be investigating whether criminal threats were made, not whether an assault occurred. Klein denied any wrongdoing through his lawyer. The EBU clarified in a statement that its decision to disqualify Klein "did not involve any other performer or delegation member". AVROTROS later stated that the disqualification was "very heavy and disproportionate". On 12 August, the Swedish Prosecution Authority announced that the case against Klein was closed because it could not be proven that the act "was capable of causing serious fear or that [he] had any such intention". The prosecutor also stated: “The investigation has come to the conclusion that the man made a movement that hit the woman's film camera”.

In June 2024, Klein released the singles "Luchtballon", "The Bird Song", and "Fußball (World Cup 1998)", followed by a collaboration with Käärijä titled "Trafik!" on 12 July. He additionally performed at various festivals across Europe between June and August 2024. During his slot at the 2024 edition of Pinkpop on 22 June, Klein discussed his Eurovision experience and ended his performance by saying, "Why the fuck not, 2025", leading to speculation that he was considering entering Eurovision again in 2025. The following day, Klein added "Eurovision 2025" to his biography line on Instagram and TikTok, fuelling further speculation. After deciding to participate, AVROTROS offered Klein the opportunity to represent the Netherlands in Eurovision 2025; however, despite having already written a new song for possible participation, he ultimately declined.

In early 2025, Klein announced a concert tour, named the Europapa Tour, with 17 locations across Europe and North America, including shows such as Helsinki and New York. This tour ran from 20 February to 5 April, ending in Los Angeles.

=== 2026–present: Coachella and World Tour ===
After the Europapa Tour in early 2025, Klein released the singles "Why Not???", "All Inclusive Türkiye", "Everyday", and "Kutmuziek"; along with the albums Kleinkunst and the EP Boyband, the latter of which was recorded with Käärijä and Tommy Cash. After announcing his first official world tour in December 2025, Klein embarked on the tour by performing a concert in the Ziggo Dome, and ending in Perth on 8 December 2026. Klein became a coach on The Voice van Vlaanderen season 10.

== Discography ==
Studio albums

- Dakloos (2016)
- Scandinavian Boy (2017)
- M van Marketing (2018) (with Donnie)
- Albino (2019)
- 1983 (2019)
- Joost Klein 7 (2020)
- Albino Sports, Vol. 1 (2020) (with Brunzyn)
- Fryslân (2022)
- Unity (2025)
- Kleinkunst (2026)
- Dutch Hardcore (2026)

== Awards and nominations ==
Year	Award	Category	Nominee(s)	Result	Ref.
2022	3voor12 Award	Best Album	"Fryslân"	Nominated	
2022	Friese Pop Awards	Song of the Year	"Fryslân Bop"	Won	
2023	Popprijs	Buma Cultuur Pop Award	Himself	Won	
2023	3FM Awards	Best Artist	Himself	Won	
2023	1LIVE Krone	Best Song	"Friesenjung" (with Ski Aggu and Otto Waalkes)	Won	
2024	3FM Awards	Best Artist	Himself	Won	
2024	You're a Vision Award	Most Remarkable Outfit	Himself	Third place	
2024	OUTmusic Awards	Eurovision Song of the Year	"Europapa"	Runner-up	
2024	Buma Awards	Best International Song	"Friesenjung" (with Ski Aggu and Otto Waalkes)	Fifth place	
2025	Edison Pop Awards	Song of the Year	"Europapa"	Nominated	
2025	Friese Pop Awards	Song of the Year	"Europapa"	Won	
2025	Friese Pop Awards	Music Video of the Year	"Europapa"	Won	
2025	Zapp Awards	Favorite Dutch Track	"Europapa"	Won	
2025	3FM Awards	Best Song	"Europapa"	Won	
2025	3FM Awards	Schaal van Rigter Award	"Europapa"	Won	
2025	3FM Awards	Best Artist	Himself	Nominated	

Achievements
Preceded by Mia Nicolai and Dion Cooper with "Burning Daylight"	Netherlands in the Eurovision Song Contest; 2024	Succeeded by Claude with "C'est la vie"
