= Luchtballon =

Single by Joost Klein

from the album Unity
- Released: 4 June 2024
- Genre: Bouncy techno
- Length: 2:16
- Songwriters: Joost Klein; Richard Marx; Teun de Kruif; Thijmen Melissant
- Producers: Teun de Kruif; Thijmen Melissant

Joost Klein singles chronology
"Europapa" (2024)	"Luchtballon" (2024)	"The Bird Song" (2024)

Music video
- "Luchtballon" on YouTube

"Luchtballon" (lit. 'air balloon') is a song by Dutch singer Joost Klein, released as a single on 4 June 2024. Klein co-wrote the song with Tantu Beats and Thijmen Melissant, the latter two of whom produced it. The song samples "Right Here Waiting" by Richard Marx, who received a writing credit. "Luchtballon" was released after Klein's participation in the Eurovision Song Contest 2024 and subsequent disqualification from the contest's final.

== Personnel ==
Musicians

- Joost Klein – performer
- Tantu Beats – performer

Technical

- Joost Klein – songwriter
- Tantu Beats – producer and songwriter
- Thijmen Melissant – composer and producer
- Richard Marx – composer
- Teun de Kruif – composer

== Music video production ==
The music video was directed by Lowpolyon, with the 3D animation created by Bruno Verhaar, Iri Pauwels and Lyon Pol using Blender. It utilises a 2000s 3D animation style. The video references Grand Theft Auto and the Matrix, among other subjects.

== Charts ==
Chart performance for "Luchtballon"
Chart (2024)	Peak position
Belgium (Ultratop 50 Flanders)	15
Lithuania (AGATA)	48
Netherlands (Dutch Top 40)	25
Netherlands (Single Top 100)	4

== Certifications ==
Certifications for "Luchtballon"
Region	Certification	Certified units/sales
Belgium (BRMA)	Platinum	40,000^{‡}
^{‡} Sales+streaming figures based on certification alone.
