= Friesenjung =

Single by Ski Aggu, Joost and Otto Waalkes

from the album Denk mal drüber nach...
- Language: German
- Released: 26 May 2023
- Genre: Rap; techno
- Length: 2:26
- Label: Jungeratze; Albino Sports
- Songwriters: Otto Waalkes; Gordon Sumner
- Producers: Tantu Beats; Vieze Asbak

Ski Aggu singles chronology
"Mandala" (2023)	"Friesenjung" (2023)	"Mietfrei" (2023)

Joost singles chronology
"Wachtmuziek" (2022)	"Friesenjung" (2023)	"Droom groot" (2023)

Music video
- "Friesenjung" on YouTube

"Friesenjung" (transl. "Frisian Boy") is a 1993 song by German comedian and musician Otto Waalkes and a parody of Sting's "Englishman in New York", in which Frisian life (relating to East Frisia, the region where Waalkes comes from) is highlighted.

German rapper Ski Aggu and Dutch musician Joost Klein used a sample of the song in their own track "Friesenjung", which was released as a single on 25 May 2023. It subsequently reached number one in Germany and Austria.

== Charts ==
=== Weekly charts ===
Weekly chart performance for "Friesenjung"
Chart (2023–2024)	Peak position
Austria (Ö3 Austria Top 40)	1
Germany (GfK)	1
Global Excl. US (Billboard)	115
Latvia Streaming (LaIPA)	15
Lithuania (AGATA)	12
Netherlands (Single Top 100)	18
Netherlands Tip (Dutch Top 40)	1
Poland (Polish Streaming Top 100)	84
Sweden (Sverigetopplistan)	100
Switzerland (Schweizer Hitparade)	7

=== Year-end charts ===
Year-end chart performance for "Friesenjung"
Chart (2023)	Position
Austria (Ö3 Austria Top 40)	15
Germany (Official German Charts)	12
Switzerland (Schweizer Hitparade)	91

== Certifications ==
Certifications for "Friesenjung"
Region	Certification	Certified units/sales
Austria (IFPI Austria)	Platinum	30,000^{‡}
Belgium (BRMA)	Gold	20,000^{‡}
Germany (BVMI)	Platinum	600,000^{‡}
Poland (ZPAV)	Gold	25,000^{‡}
Switzerland (IFPI Switzerland)	Gold	10,000^{‡}
^{‡} Sales+streaming figures based on certification alone.
