= Europapa =

2024 song by Joost Klein

Single by Joost

from the album Unity
- Language: Dutch
- English title: "Eurodaddy"
- Released: 29 February 2024
- Genre: Rave; happy hardcore; gabber; Europop
- Length: 2:40
- Label: Self-released
- Composers: Paul Elstak; Teun de Kruif; Thijmen Melissant
- Lyricists: Joost Klein; Donny Ellerström; Tim Haars
- Producers: Paul Elstak; Teun de Kruif

Joost singles chronology
"Droom groot" (2023)	"Europapa" (2024)	"Luchtballon" (2024)

Music video
- "Europapa" on YouTube

Eurovision Song Contest 2024 entry
- Country: Netherlands
- Language: Dutch
- Composers: Dylan van Dael (Note: Van Dael is credited solely as the composer of the outro. Therefore, he is not credited on the single, but is credited on the Eurovision version which interpolates the aforementioned outro.); Paul Elstak; Teun de Kruif; Thijmen Melissant
- Lyricists: Joost Klein; Donny Ellerström; Tim Haars

Finals performance
- Semi-final result: 2nd
- Semi-final points: 182
- Final result: Disqualified

Entry chronology
- ◄ "Burning Daylight" (2023)
- "C'est la vie" (2025) ►

Official performance video
- "Europapa" (Second Semi-Final) on YouTube

"Europapa" (Dutch pronunciation: [ˈøːroːˌpɑpaː]) is a song by Dutch musician Joost Klein. Self-described as a "very Dutch" 1990s-style song, it was written by Klein along with six other songwriters. It was self-released on 29 February 2024 after the song and its video clip premiered on a special live broadcast of De Avondshow met Arjen Lubach that same day at 16:45 CET. It was the Netherlands' entry in the Eurovision Song Contest 2024, where it was disqualified from the final due to Klein reportedly making "unlawful threats" to a member of the contest's production crew, prompting a police investigation that eventually led to Klein's charges being dropped. The song was the first and as of 2026, only in the contest's history to be disqualified after the contest had started. The song was later included in Klein's ninth studio album, Unity (2025).

The song has been described as an ode to Europe and a "letter" to his late father, who taught him that the world has "no borders". It was met with relative praise from both Dutch and international media, with support for the song's message about the advocacy of diversity along with the tribute to Klein's father being mentioned. "Europapa" was met with commercial success, peaking at number one on the singles charts of the Netherlands, Flanders, Latvia and Lithuania, in the process becoming the most streamed competing song of Eurovision 2024 on Spotify and YouTube.

== Background and composition ==
"Europapa" was composed by Paul Elstak, Teun de Kruif (Tantu Beats), Thijmen Melissant, and Dylan van Dael, and written by Joost Klein, Donny Ellerström (Maradonnie), and Tim Haars (as Gerrie from New Kids). In interviews, Klein stated that the song is an ode to Europe and a "letter to his deceased father", who taught him that the world has "no borders", with his father stating that "borders are invented by people and that you can therefore invent the world yourself." Described by Trouw as "retro happy hardcore", the song's style draws inspiration from 2 Unlimited and Vengaboys according to Klein, being a mix between the "typical Eurovision genre" and "gabber". Vulture's Jon O'Brien also noted influences from Scooter. The song premiered on 29 February 2024 on a special live broadcast of De Avondshow met Arjen Lubach at 16:45 CET (15:45 UTC), hosted by Arjen Lubach.

The song itself features an orphan child "wanting to tell his story", which was inspired by Klein's upbringing. The first lines praise the Schengen Area and its relative open borders, stating that even without a passport, Klein can still visit friends across international borders. It references the Stromae song "Papaoutai" midway through the song, referring to a line within "Papaoutai" where the singer asks where his father is. In an analysis by Wiwibloggs' Ruxandra Tudor, it was described to have "embodie[d] a collective ethos... It’s a philosophy that celebrates diversity, fosters connection, and embraces the shared humanity that unites us all". The end of the song features a somber message to his father, in which Klein realizes the impact his father had on him.

== Music video and promotion ==
Along with the song's release, an accompanying music video was released on the same day. Directed by Véras Fawaz, a personal friend of Klein, the music video for "Europapa" was premiered live on De Avondshow met Arjen Lubach at 16:45 CET, followed by a release on the Eurovision Song Contest channel on YouTube ten minutes later. The music video was filmed at the Etersheimer Braakmolen mill in the municipality of Edam-Volendam. It features cameo appearances by past Dutch Eurovision entrants René Froger (2009, as part of De Toppers) and S10 (2022), in addition to Emma Wortelboer, the Dutch spokesperson for the 2019 contest, and TikTokers Appie Mussa and Stuntkabouter. Co-lyricist Tim Haars appears briefly in character as Gerrie from New Kids. According to Fawaz, throughout production, he described Klein as "very difficult" to work with. In an interview with Algemeen Dagblad, Fawaz stated that Klein "struck out a few times against my assistant on my set. I had a lot of fights with him during the process... [before the release], it was 'this sucks, I am not feeling it, I am not releasing this' all the time." Fawaz later declared Klein as a "control freak", adding that "being a control freak is his greatest strength and his greatest weakness."

In interviews, Klein has stated that the video details the story of "an orphan traveling Europe ... trying to get known, to get his name out there". The video is heavily inspired by his life story; particularly the event of losing his father early in his life. The end of the video displays a family photo featuring Klein and his dad, along with a house burning; to Klein, it represented years of therapy and "how in certain therapy sessions they make you write down ... a part of your story, and then you have to burn it to make room for new energy". In another interview given by Fawaz, the video, which features K-pop dancers and a mobility scooter race, is meant to represent "the embodiment of the Joost cinematic universe".

=== Promotion ===
To further promote the song in the months before the Eurovision Song Contest, Klein performed the song on numerous occasions. He first performed the song live during a concert at 013 in Tilburg. He later announced his intent to participate in various Eurovision pre-parties throughout the month of April, including Eurovision in Concert 2024 on 13 April and the Nordic Eurovision Party on 14 April. Klein also released an EP inspired by the song on 5 April, which featured the original variation of the song along with five other remixed versions of "Europapa", including a ringtone and nightcore version.

== Critical reception ==
=== Dutch media and personalities ===
"Europapa" has drawn relatively positive reactions. Richard van de Crommert, writer for De Telegraaf, felt that the song was a strong representation of Dutch culture, declaring it a "cheerful and crazy composition". Linda Wagenmakers, a Dutch representative that participated in the 2000 edition of the contest, praised the song for being having a "happy hardcore sound... [it's] great for the energy. It's also nice that he sings some phrases from other languages in between." Frank van Pamelen, a Dutch comedian, stated in Algemeen Dagblad that although "he will not win a Nobel Prize with it", he thought that "the Eurovision Song Contest is a possibility. I like it... It is a real contender." In contrast, journalist Johan Derksen stated on Dutch talk show Vandaag Inside that "I like good wine and this is sparkling lemonade... I don't want anything to do with this bullshit. I am ashamed that he represents the Netherlands."

=== Eurovision-related and international media ===
In a Wiwibloggs review containing several reviews from several critics, the song was rated 7.4 out of 10 points, earning ninth out of 37 songs on the site's annual ranking. Another review conducted by ESC Bubble that contained reviews from a combination of readers and juries rated the song second out of the 16 songs in the Eurovision semi-final "Europapa" was in. Vulture's Jon O'Brien ranked the song seventh overall, acknowledging that it might be "as divisive as the Brexit referendum" but praising the "strangely moving" ending of the song that paid tribute to Klein's father. Erin Adams, writer for The Scotsman, gave the song a heavily positive review, rating it nine out of 10 points and declaring it an "Eurovision anthem". In contrast, ESC Beat's Doron Lahav ranked the song 27th overall.

== Eurovision Song Contest ==
=== Internal selection ===
The Netherlands' broadcaster for the Eurovision Song Contest, AVROTROS, announced its intent to participate in the Eurovision Song Contest 2024 on 16 May 2023, confirming an internal selection in July. A committee of seven people consisting of Jacqueline Govaert, Jaap Reesema, Carolien Borgers, Hila Noorzai, Cornald Maas, Sander Lantinga, and chairman Twan van de Nieuwenhuijzen selected ten artists for a shortlist; the list was later shortened down to five for live auditions which took place on 28 November. On 11 December, Klein was officially announced as the Netherlands' representative for Eurovision.

=== At Eurovision ===
The Eurovision Song Contest 2024 took place at the Malmö Arena in Malmö, Sweden, and consisted of two semi-finals held on the respective dates of 7 and 9 May and the final on 11 May 2024. During the allocation draw on 30 January 2024, the Netherlands was drawn to compete in the second semi-final, performing in the second half of the show. Klein was later drawn to perform in the 16th and last position in the semi-final, after Norway's Gåte.

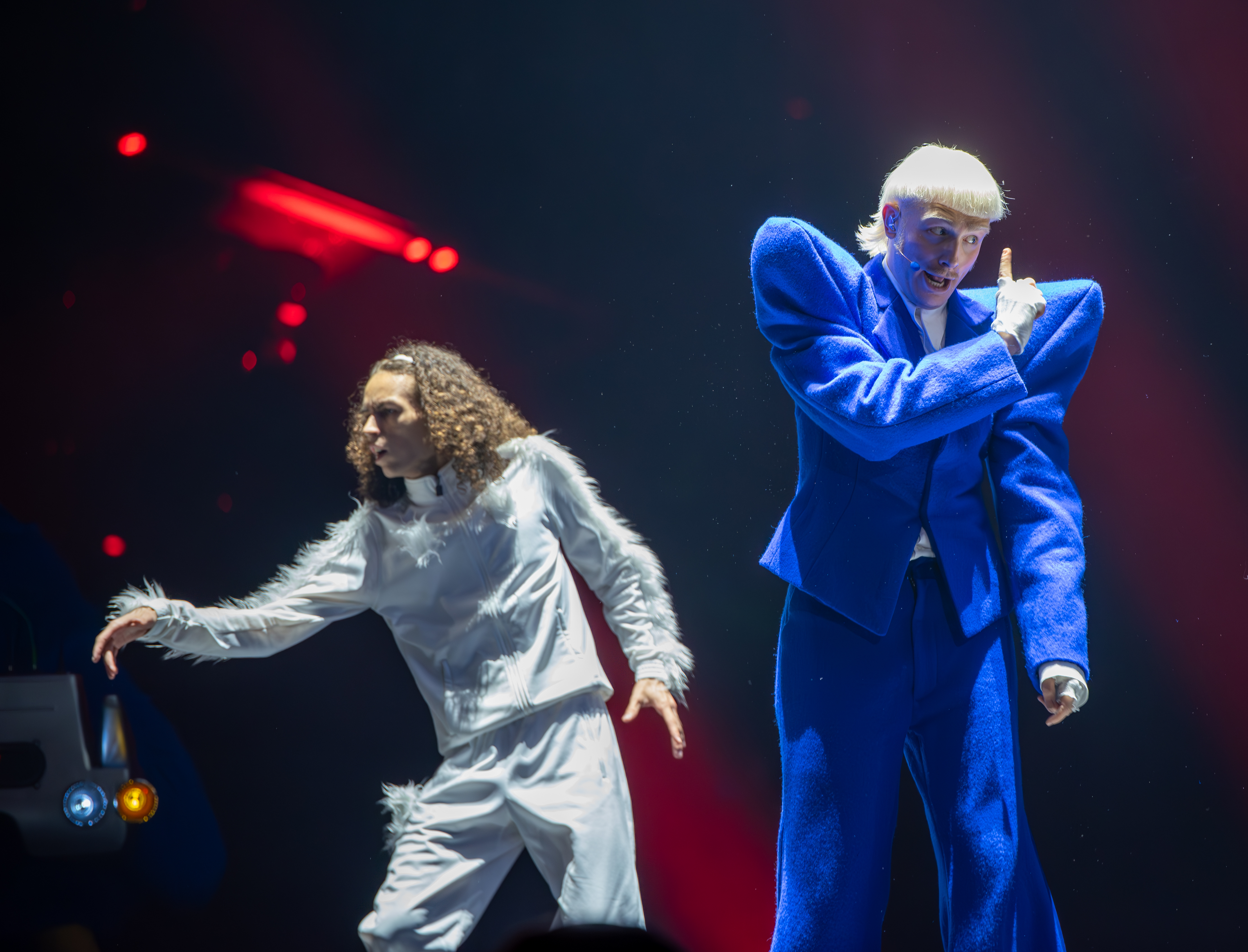
Klein performing "Europapa" during the Eurovision 2024 semi-finals.

For his Eurovision performance, Dutch comedian Gover Meit (known professionally as Donny Ronny) was appointed as the staging director. Before the contest, Meit claimed that the performance would have unique aspects never seen before in Eurovision. The performance features Dutch YouTubers Appie Mussa (dressed in a blue and yellow bird costume) and Stuntkabouter, with Klein wearing an International Klein Blue-coloured suit with exaggerated shoulder pads surrounded by two backing dancers. According to Klein, Mussa's bird costume was made to represent his childhood and his "inner child", and was inspired by Wizzy & Woppy, a Flemish children's television show. The opening shot displays an image of Klein speaking the first lines of the song, with following displays including pictures of food, the slogan "Douze Points", a frozen Microsoft Windows screen, shots from the song's music video, and animations of Klein. Nearing the end of the performance, Klein performs the hakken dance, a dance that is associated with Dutch raves. The performance was remarked to have gone at a fast pace according to Trouw, who stated that it "passed by at such a fast pace that it was difficult to make sense of it all... Maybe the TikTok generation will like it".

Amidst the semi-final performance, reception to the performance was mixed. Trouw's Sylvain Ephimenco praised the performance, particularly Klein's outfit, which was viewed by Ephimenco as "self-mockery... you have the cheerful appearance of an artist who does not want to appear too serious... an ode to our continental home." However, the staging and Meit received some criticism for promising too much; De Telegraaf writer Richard van de Crommert stated that the promise was "not returned", referring to a lack of the use of augmented reality. "Europapa" nevertheless was able to secure a position in the grand final, finishing in second with 182 televoting points, only behind Israel's Eden Golan.

==== Disqualification ====
Klein was later drawn to perform fifth in the final following his qualification, after Luxembourg's Tali and before Israel's Eden Golan. The day before the final, Klein did not take part in the dress rehearsal, despite being present at the flag parade rehearsal, with the EBU stating he would not be rehearsing "until further notice" due to an "incident" involving him being investigated. During the jury show, which was held the same evening, Klein did not perform again, with his semi-final performance being used as a replacement. On the day of the final, the EBU released a statement stating that Klein would not perform in the grand final due to the Swedish police having investigated a "complaint made by a female member of the production crew after an incident following his performance" in the second semi-final. According to Swedish police, Klein had been reported for making "unlawful threats" that included making intimidating threats to a camerawoman without touching her; the incident breached the EBU's "zero-tolerance" policy regarding "inappropriate behaviour". Klein later denied any wrongdoing through his lawyer, Jan-Åke Fält. Fält later released a statement on behalf of Klein, in which he stated, "it is only natural that he is feeling deflated after everything that has happened... everything has completely been taken out of context. It is only natural that he became upset and that he could not participate at Eurovision because of that." Klein was later cleared of criminal charges in August of that year.

==== Reactions to disqualification ====
The disqualification was received heavily negatively in the Netherlands. In a press release statement, Dutch broadcaster AVROTROS stated that they were "shocked" and called the decision to disqualify Klein "very heavy and disproportionate". Cornald Maas, AVROTROS' television commentator for the Eurovision Song Contest and member of its Dutch selection committee, declared the punishment "cruel and unusual" and later added, "fuck the EBU". AVROTROS subsequently refused to present its jury points live on air during the final. Instead, the contest's executive supervisor, Martin Österdahl, announced the Dutch jury points amid loud boos from the audience.

Appie Mussa, in response to their disqualification, released a TikTok that criticised the EBU, where he imitated a satirical version of the organisation. In it, he claimed that despite Klein doing "basically nothing", the EBU opted to disqualify him nevertheless. He further went on to criticize the EBU's handling of calls to exclude Israel from that year's contest. The duo Van der Laan & Woe, hosts of the Dutch satirical BNNVARA-show Even tot hier, performed a parody of the song that within its verses criticised the EBU; among these were lines that stated that the investigation "really screwed Joost there" and that "the IKEA jury members have a screw loose". The New York Times reported that church bells and carillons across the Netherlands played "Europapa" in the wake of Klein's disqualification, along with the trend of a hashtag that demanded "justice for Joost". Fellow Dutch singer Nielson released an ode to Klein entitled "Joost", calling Klein a "hero" despite his exclusion from Eurovision. On the day of the final, NPO Radio 2 cancelled its traditional Eurovision Song Contest Top 50 broadcast due to the disqualification. DJ Jasper de Vries took over the airtime and, responding to listener requests, instead played "Europapa" repeatedly for half an hour, airing it nine times in a row.

== Cover versions ==
After the song's release, several cover versions were made in the Netherlands, for instance in Dutch Sign Language and on barrel organ. Parodies of the song were dedicated to similar sounding locations and concepts, such as Europapark railway station in Groningen, the Europaplein square in Leeuwarden, Parkstad and the folk music style hoempapa.

== Commercial performance ==
In the Netherlands, the song broke the record for the most streamed song in a single day on Spotify within the country, it reached top 5 positions in 10 European countries, and became worldwide the most streamed song of all songs participating in the contest that year, both on Spotify and YouTube.

== Track listing ==
Digital download / streaming – original
No.	Title	Lyrics	Music	Producer(s)	Length
1.	"Europapa"	Joost Klein; Donny Ellerström; Tim Haars	Paul Elstak; Teun de Kruif; Thijmen Melissant	De Kruif; Elstak	2:40
2.	"Europapa" (outro)	Klein	Dylan van Dael; De Kruif	De Kruif; Van Dael	1:07
Total length:					3:47

Europapa: Greatest Hits EP
No.	Title	Length
1.	"Europapa"	2:40
2.	"Europapa" (Official Remix (by Vieze Asbak and Gladde Paling))	1:48
3.	"Europapa" (Used remix)	2:26
4.	"Europapa" (DJ Paul Elstak remix)	3:01
5.	"Europapa" (sped up)	2:02
6.	"Europapa" (ringtone)	0:57
Total length:		12:57

== Charts ==
=== Weekly charts ===
Weekly chart performance for "Europapa"
Chart (2024)	Peak position
Austria (Ö3 Austria Top 40)	5
Belgium (Ultratop 50 Flanders)	1
Belgium (Ultratop 50 Wallonia)	31
Croatia (Billboard)	3
Czech Republic Singles Digital (ČNS IFPI)	33
Denmark (Tracklisten)	36
Finland (Suomen virallinen lista)	2
Germany (GfK)	13
Global 200 (Billboard)	51
Greece International Streaming (IFPI)	6
Iceland (Tónlistinn)	6
Ireland (IRMA)	22
Israel (Mako Hitlist)	69
Latvia Streaming (LaIPA)	1
Lithuania (AGATA)	1
Luxembourg (Billboard)	7
Netherlands (Dutch Top 40)	1
Netherlands (Single Top 100)	1
New Zealand Hot Singles (RMNZ)	17
Norway (VG-lista)	17
Poland (Polish Streaming Top 100)	14
Portugal (AFP)	79
Slovakia Singles Digital (ČNS IFPI)	43
Spain (PROMUSICAE)	60
Sweden (Sverigetopplistan)	4
Switzerland (Schweizer Hitparade)	12
UK Singles (Official Charts)	37
UK Dance (Official Charts)	10
UK Independent (Official Charts)	6
US Hot Dance/Electronic Songs (Billboard)	14
US World Digital Song Sales (Billboard)	2

=== Year-end charts ===
2024 year-end chart performance for "Europapa"
Chart (2024)	Position
Belgium (Ultratop 50 Flanders)	5
Netherlands (Dutch Top 40)	20
Netherlands (Single Top 100)	1

2025 year-end chart performance for "Europapa"
Chart (2025)	Position
Belgium (Ultratop 50 Flanders)	162

== Certifications ==
Certifications for "Europapa"
Region	Certification	Certified units/sales
Belgium (BRMA)	5× Platinum	200,000^{‡}
Netherlands (NVPI)	Gold	46,500^{‡}
Poland (ZPAV)	Gold	25,000^{‡}
^{‡} Sales+streaming figures based on certification alone.

== Awards and nominations ==
Year	Award	Category	Result	Ref.
2024	OUTmusic Awards	Eurovision Song of the Year	Runner-up	
2025	3FM Awards	Best Song	Won	
2025	3FM Awards	Schaal van Rigter Award	Won	
2025	Friese Pop Awards	Song of the Year	Won	
2025	Friese Pop Awards	Music Video of the Year	Won	
