= Donnie (Dutch rapper) =

Dutch rapper (born 1994)

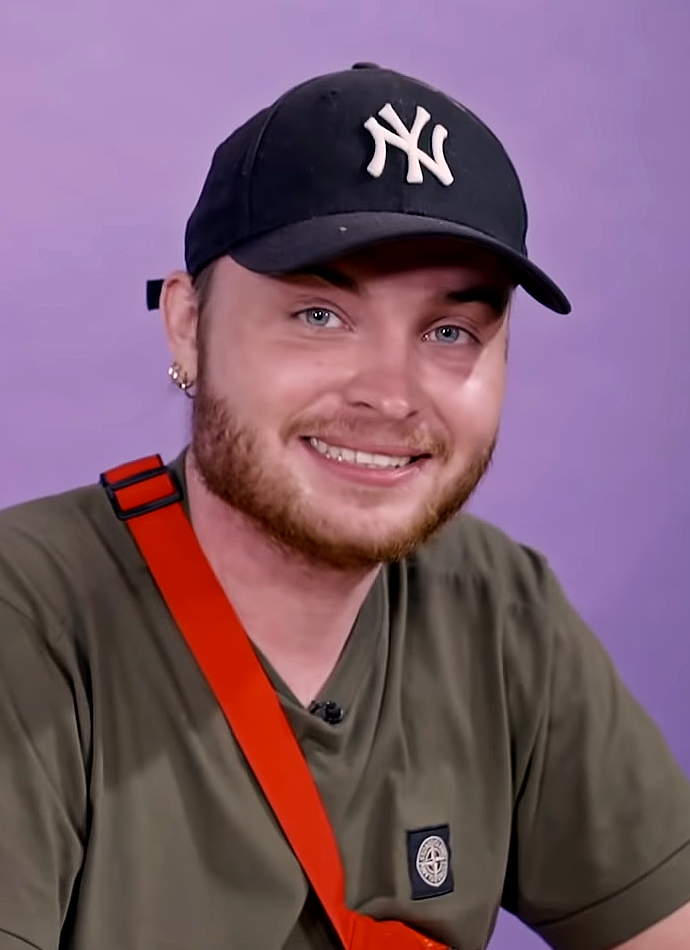
- Ellerström in 2018

Background information
- Also known as: Maradonnie; Donald Scloszkie; Young Kermit
- Born: Donny Björn Stefan Ellerström; 5 August 1994 (age 32); Amsterdam, Netherlands
- Genres: Dutch hip hop; Nederpop
- Occupations: Rapper; singer; songwriter
- Years active: 2011–present
- Labels: Magnetron Music; TopNotch; 8ball Music
- Website: www.maradonnie.com

Donny Björn Stefan Ellerström (born 5 August 1994), known by the stage name Donnie and pseudonym Donald Scloszkie, is a Dutch rapper, singer and songwriter. He is best known for his songs "Snelle planga", "Frans Duits", "Bon gepakt", "Bieber van de kroeg" and "Schultenbräu".

== Early life and education ==
Donny Ellerström was born on 5 August 1994 in Amsterdam to a Dutch mother and a Swedish father. He was raised by his mother and grandmother, and grew up with two elder brothers and a younger sister. He has had little contact with his father, who served a prison sentence for most of Ellerström's childhood and currently lives in Sweden. After completing his pre-vocational secondary education, Ellerström attended a culinary college in Amsterdam and worked as a cook at a local restaurant for some time.

== Career ==
While in culinary college, Ellerström became acquainted with Dutch rapper Frans Frederiks (Lange Frans) when he won a risotto cooking competition Frederiks had organised. He subsequently featured on Frederiks's 2011 track "Brawler", alongside Faberyayo, and joined him on his concert tour in 2012, using the stage name "Young Kermit". In 2014, he was signed to the record label Magnetron Music owned by De Jeugd van Tegenwoordig producer Bas Bron.

Soon after, Ellerström released the mixtape Leipie van het plein, followed by his debut studio album Mannelogie in 2015. He gained prominence in 2018 when he popularised the usage of the slang phrase snelle planga ('flashy sunglasses') through videos on social media and the release of his single "Snelle planga". In 2019, he released the single "Barry Hayze" – a play on the name of singer Barry Hay and the cannabis strain Haze Berry – which certified gold in the Netherlands.

Since 2020, Ellerström has been releasing songs in which he combines hip hop with levenslied – a fusion genre he dubbed kibbelingsound (after palingsound and kibbeling). Examples include "Frans Duits" (with Frans Duijts), "Bon gepakt" (with René Froger), "Bieber van de kroeg" (with Mart Hoogkamer), and "Vanavond (Uit m'n bol)" (with Kris Kross Amsterdam and Tino Martin).

His 2023 album De kibbelingsound certified platinum and reached number 38 in the Dutch Album Top 100. In December 2023, it was revealed that he had co-written the entry selected by AVROTROS to represent the Netherlands in the Eurovision Song Contest 2024, to be performed by Joost Klein. The entry, "Europapa", was released on 29 February 2024. He appeared in a 2024 episode of the television show The Masked Singer.

== Personal life ==
Ellerström has used the pseudonym "Donald Scloszkie" in songwriting since 2018. He has two sons, born in 2020 and 2022.

== Discography ==
=== Studio albums ===
Title	Details	Peak chart positions	
Title	Details	NLD	BEL (FL)
Leipie van het plein	Released: 10 August 2014; Label: Magnetron Music	—	—
Mannelogie	Released: 4 September 2015; Label: Magnetron Music	—	—
Loei ordinair	Released: 15 April 2016; Label: Magnetron Music	99	—
BFMJT	Released: 2 June 2017; Label: Magnetron Music	73	—
M van Marketing (with Joost)	Released: 3 August 2018; Label: Made	10	79
Door het licht	Released: 15 March 2019; Label: TopNotch	22	—
Vader / Strijder	Released: 5 August 2022; Label: Maradonnie	—	—
De kibbelingsound	Released: 2 June 2023; Label: 8ball Music / Maradonnie	38	—
"—" denotes an album that did not chart or was not released in that territory.

=== Extended plays ===
Title	Details
Kwart voor monnie	Released: 16 September 2016; Label: Magnetron Music

=== Charted singles ===
==== As lead artist ====
Title	Year	Peak chart positions		Album
Title	Year	NLD (40)	NLD (100)	Album
"Snelle planga"	2018	—	54	Non-album single
"Barry Hayze" (featuring Willie Wartaal)	2019	—	62	Door het licht
"Geen centen, maar spullen" (with Frans Bauer)	2020	—	65	Non-album single
"Frans Duits" (with Frans Duijtsder af)	2021	19	10	De kibbelingsound
"Bon gepakt" (with René Froger)	2021	5	3	De kibbelingsound
"Bieber van de kroeg" (with Mart Hoogkamer)	2022	22	6	De kibbelingsound
"Vanavond (Uit m'n bol)" (with Kris Kross Amsterdam and Tino Martin)	2022	7	2	De kibbelingsound
"Der af (Oya lélé)" (with Kris Kross Amsterdam and Roxeanne Hazes)	2023	36	29	Non-album single
"Schultenbräu" (with Chantal Janzen)	2023	7	7	De kibbelingsound
"Hier mag alles" (with Marco Schuitmaker)	2023	13	4	Non-album singles
"Nachtenlang" (with Yves Berendse)	2025	11	6	Non-album singles
"Moët dat nou" (with Robert van Hemert)	2026	—	26	Non-album singles
"—" denotes a single that did not chart or was not released in that territory.

==== As featured artist ====
Title	Year	Peak chart positions	Album
Title	Year	NLD (100)	Album
"Skaffa" (Bizzey featuring Donnie and Poke)	2020	60	Non-album single
