= Tantu Beats =

Dutch DJ and producer (born 1993)

- Born: Teun de Kruif; 3 September 1993 (age 32); Utrecht, Netherlands
- Genres: Hip hop; gabber-pop; house; pop
- Occupations: DJ; record producer
- Instrument: Electronic software
- Years active: 2008–present
- Website: https://tantubeats.com/

Teun de Kruif (born 3 September 1993), known professionally as Tantu Beats, is a Dutch record producer and DJ. He is mainly known for his work with Joost Klein. In addition to his work with other artists, he also produces and sells individual beats himself. De Kruif also co-wrote and produced Klein's song "Europapa", which represented the Netherlands in the Eurovision Song Contest 2024.

== Biography ==
De Kruif was a fanatical skateboarder, but when he could no longer skate due to a knee injury at the age of fourteen, he decided to make hip-hop beats in FL Studio. In 2009, De Kruif started uploading beats to the internet, including YouTube and Myspace. In 2010, he and a friend started a website where he sold beats under a non-exclusive license.

After completing his pre-university education, De Kruif initially chose to study communication sciences in Amsterdam, but he soon realized that this was not his passion. He ultimately chose Music and Technology at the Utrecht School of the Arts (HKU). In 2014 he started making music full-time and took preparatory training at the HKU in the evening, after which he was admitted to the full course. Although his company had been successful since 2012, he still wanted to pursue relevant studies to broaden his technical knowledge.

In 2017, De Kruif interned at BeatStars, an American music licensing platform based in Austin, Texas. In January 2018, he received a message from Italian rapper Gemitaiz who wanted to buy a beat from him. This was for the song Questa Qua. At the end of April of that year, the album debuted at number one on the Italian album top 100. He initially produced his beats from a student room in Zuilen, but moved to Berlin in 2021.

De Kruif is a collaborator of Joost Klein and has produced several albums with him. Their collaboration contributed to the revival of gabber-pop with songs such as "Droom groot", "Friesenjung", and the Dutch entry for the Eurovision Song Contest 2024, "Europapa". He has also produced for Higher Brothers, bbno$, Paulo Londra, Cosculluela, Tai Verdes, S10 and Merol, among others.

== Discography ==
=== Studio albums ===
Title	Album details
Language of Beats	Released: 21 June 2014; Label: Self-released; Formats: Digital download, streaming
Bounce House [Beat Tape]	Released: 6 April 2020; Label: Self-released; Formats: Digital download, streaming
Meditate [Beat Tape]	Released: 28 January 2021; Label: Self-released; Formats: Digital download, streaming

=== Singles ===
Title	Year	Album or EP
"Tantu Beats Anthem"	2023	Non-album single
