= Marktrock =

Annual music festival in Leuven, Belgium

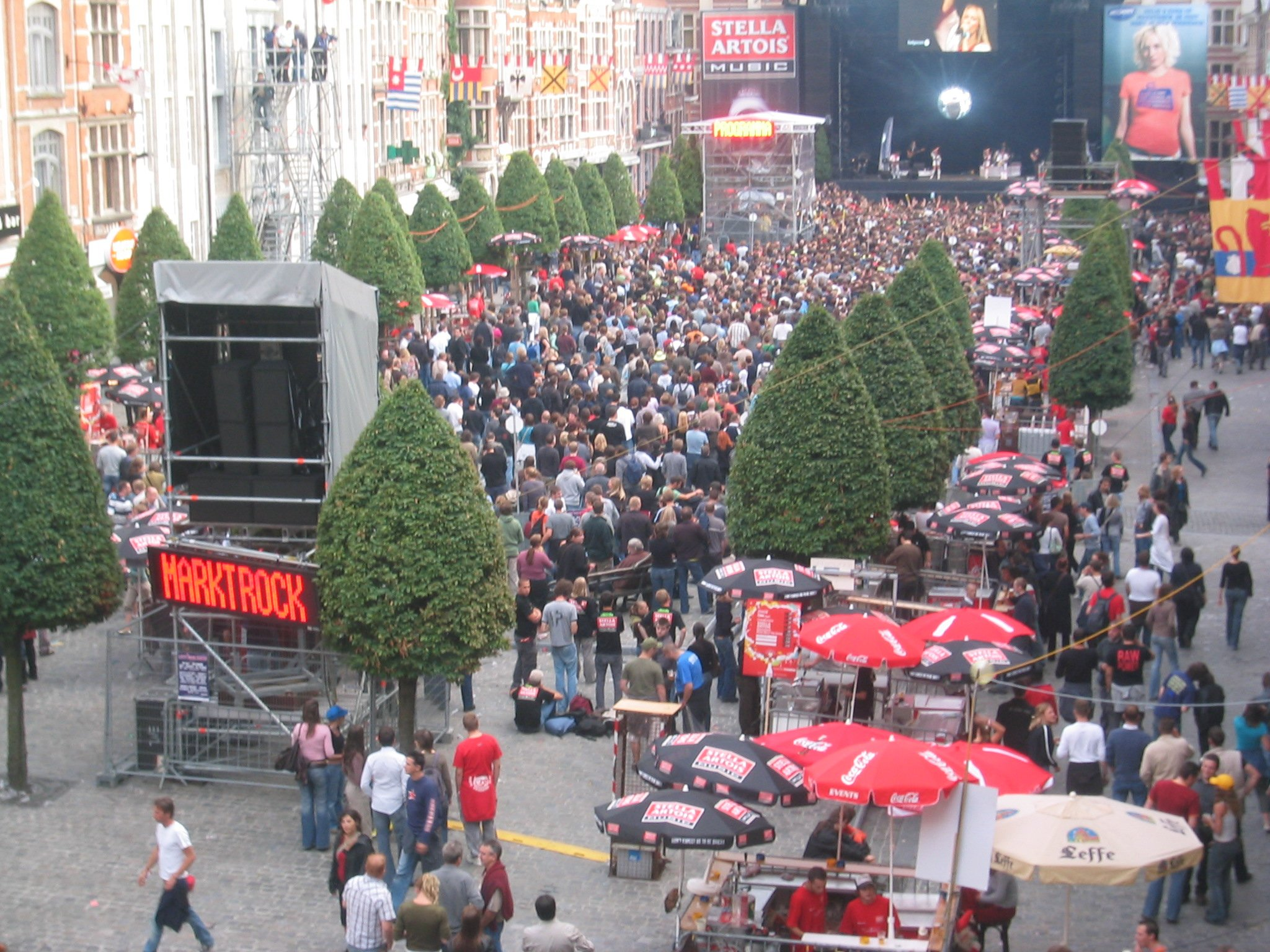
- Genre: Alternative rock, Pop, Dutch
- Dates: Friday and weekend closest to 15 August
- Locations: Leuven, Belgium
- Years active: 1982 – ?
- Website: www.marktrock.com

Marktrock is a music festival held each year around 15 August, in the heart of the university town of Leuven, Belgium. There is also a smaller Marktrock festival in Poperinge, which is held on the last Saturday of August.

The name Marktrock comes from the Dutch word markt, meaning market, and it is held on 2 squares (4 until 24th edition) in the historical city center of Leuven: "Oude Markt" and "Ladeuzeplein". Until the 24th edition (2006), the three-day festival always had 15 August Assumption Day as its last day.

In 2004, the 22nd edition of the Marktrock festival was held in Leuven and it has grown into one of Europe's biggest urban music festivals with over 350,000 visitors each year.

On 5 February 2007, the Marktrock VZW organization announced the end of the festival. The main reasons behind the decision were the raising price of quality artists and groups, the low capacity of the main stage on the Oude Markt, the new and expensive legal regulations each year, the financial risk of open-air festivals, and the organization refused to raise entry tickets for the Oude Markt stage again. The rain during the 2006 edition certainly didn't help either. Over the 24-year history of the original Marktrock, more than 1,400 artists performed at Marktrock, more than 5 million people visited the festival, and it launched several Belgian artists.

In March 2007, Marktrock came under new management, which revived the festival and redesigned the 2007 edition. The free stages disappeared, replaced by two paying stages: the Oude Markt focused on local and upcoming bands, while the larger Ladeuzeplein featured established and international artists. This new set-up met with significant criticism and attendance was low.

For the 2008 edition, the festival was once again revamped, bringing back the various free stages throughout the city, leaving only the Oude Markt with an entry fee. The festival still struggled to draw the crowds it used to draw.

The 2009 festival changed its approach once more, ditching both the entry fee and international acts. It secured additional funding from the city of Leuven on the condition that the festival would focus on local talent. Despite a line-up of mostly obscure bands, this edition drew an estimated 95,000 visitors, causing minor organisational problems as visitors were turned back from venues that were filled to capacity.

== Marktrock 1982 ==
- 1st edition
- Lineup: The Snörkels, Go Go-Slip, Polizei, Duplex Johnson, Big Bill, Boxcars, Scooter

== Marktrock 1984 ==
- 2nd edition
- Lineup: Wim De Craene, Toots Thielemans, Roland & the Bluesworkshop, Jaccamacca Joggers, White Line Fever, Luc van Acker, The Scabs, Jo Lemaire, Time Bandits, Dave Edmunds

== Marktrock 1985 ==
- 3rd edition
- Lineup: Eric Melaerts Group, Guido Belcanto, Will Tura, Beri Beri and Romeo Spinelli, Boogie Boy, Roland & Centimeters, The Hattricks, 2 Belgen, The Boxcars, The Kids, The Blasters, Nick Lowe

== Marktrock 1986 ==
- 4th edition
- Lineup: De Kreuners, Rufus Thomas, The Luther Allison Band, The Skyblasters, Big Bill, LSP Band, Midnight Service, The Pop Gun, Dirk Blanchart, The Yéh-Yéh's, Catalog of Cool, Don Dixon, Graham Parker

== Marktrock 1987 ==
- 5th edition
- Lineup: Clouseau, Maurane, Johan Verminnen, The Push, BJ Scott, Dave Edmunds, Family Duck, The Soulsisters, Jo Lemaire, Dr. Feelgood, Katrina & the Waves, Southside Johnny and the Jukes

== Marktrock 1988 ==
- 6th edition
- Lineup: Sweat By Two, Elli Medeiros, Junior Walker & the All Stars, Blue Blot, K13, The Skyblasters, Bart Peeters & the Radios, Dr. Feelgood, Ze Noiz, Tröckener Kecks, Won Ton Ton, Brendan Croker & the 5 O'Clock Shadows, Womack & Womack, The Fabulous Thunderbirds

== Marktrock 1989 ==
- 7th edition
- Lineup: The Scene, De Dijk, Clouseau, De Kreuners, Raymond Van het Groenewoud, The Pebbles, Wreckless Eric, Bart Peeters & de (nieuwe) Radios, Soulsister, The Wolf Banes, Sam Cooke Singers, Squeeze, The Scabs, Kevin Mc Dermott Orchestra, The Inmates, Fisher Z, The Average White Band

== Marktrock 1990 ==
- 8th edition
- Lineup: Mama's Jasje, Hugo Mathijsen & de Bomen, Will Tura, Pitti Polak, Bart Peeters, Ronny & Robert, The Pop Gun, De Kreuners, Arno, Eli Jones, Blue Blot, The Blues Band, Ten Years After, Noordkaap, The Paranoiacs, Candy Dulfer, Dan Reed Network, Nils Lofgren, The Kinks

== Marktrock 1991 ==
- 9th edition
- Lineup: Joppe Steengoedt, Tröckener Kecks, The Scene, Raymond Van het Groenewoud, Ralph Samantha & Medicine Men, BJ Scott, Ruby Turner, The Troggs, La Fille d'Ernest, Green, Leyers, Michiels & Soulsister, The Silencers, Katrina & the Waves, Mother's Finest, Status Quo

== Marktrock 1992 ==
- 10th edition
- Lineup: Pitti Polak, Elvis Belgisch, The Popgun, Clouseau, The Dinky Toys, Khadja Nin, David Rudder & Charlie's Roots, Zap Mama, The Radios, Running Cow, 2 Tribes, The Scabs, Charles & Les Lulus, The Levellers, The Scene, Van Morrison

== Marktrock 1993 ==
- 11th edition
- Lineup: The Beautiful Babies, Mama's Jasje, Hugo Mathijsen & de Bomen, Roland Celebration Band, L & M and Soulsister, Soapstone, Brendan Crocker & the Serious Offence, Tom Robinson & Band, Björn Again, J.Geils Band, The Scabs, Shine, Betty Goes Green, Noordkaap, Radiohead, Quireboys, Luka Bloom, Arno, Willy De Ville

== Marktrock 1994 ==
- 12th edition
- Lineup: Pop in Wonderland, Ronnymo', The Choice, Gorki, The Dinky Toys with guests, The Nits, De Lama's, De Mens, Chris Daniëls & the Kings, Roland, CPeX, The Counterfeit Stones, The Radios, Ashbury Faith, Inspiral Carpets, Magnapop, Axelle Red, The Creeps, Primal Scream, Pretenders, Frankie Miller

== Marktrock 1995 ==
- 13th edition
- Lineup: The Same, Edwyn Collins, Clouseau, Big Country, CPeX, Mike & the Mechanics, Nick Lowe, Belgian Asociality, Ashbury Faith, Supergroove, M People, Paul Weller, Thrum, Junkhouse, Heather Nova, Bettie Serveert, Noordkaap, Richard Thompson & Band, Status Quo, The Scene

== Marktrock 1996 ==
- 14th edition
- Lineup: Mike Flowers Pops, Helmut Lotti, Jools Holland, The Monalisas, Raymond Van het Groenewoud, Right Said Fred, The Scene, The Robert Cray Band, De Mens, Freakpower, Metal Molly, Jonathan Richman, Raw Stylus, K's Choice, Skunk Anansie, Iggy Pop, Luka Bloom

== Marktrock 1997 ==
- 15th edition
- Lineup: Blaise and Da Funkamental, Bart Peeters, Clouseau, Paul Young, Boudewijn De Groot, No Way Sis, Funky Green Dogs, Dodgy, Channel Zero, The Paladins, Thé Lau, Joan Osborne, Gary Moore, Sunny Side Up, Catherine, Katrina & the Waves, Coolio, Axelle Red, Khaled

== Marktrock 1998 ==
- 16th edition
- Lineup: Sarah, De Kreuners, Mama's Jasje, Marco Borsato, The Charlatans, The Wailers, D.A.A.U., Evil Superstars, The Posies, Moloko, Nick Lowe, The Levellers, Dreadzone, Cameron, Omar & the Howlers, Anouk, Ian Dury & the Blockheads, Ringo Starr & His All Starr Band

== Marktrock 1999 ==
- 17th edition
- Lineup: Mozaiek, Bløf, Volumia!, Clouseau, Trish & Kash, Hooverphonic, Praga Khan, Das Pop, Ilse Delange, Soulwax, Purple Prose, featuring Danny Klein, Errol Brown (voice of Hot Chocolate), The Flying Dewaele Bros, The Roswells, Eden, Jessica, Apollo 440, Jovanotti, Brand New Heavies, Buddy Guy

== Marktrock 2000 ==
- 18th edition
- Lineup: Babel, Abel, Tröckener Kecks, Mama's Jasje, Frank Boeijen, Raymond v/h Groenewoud, Will Tura, Metal Molly, Postmen, Liquido, Zap Mama, Heater Nova, The Flying Dewaele Bros, Dilana Smith, Steve Wynn, De Heideroosjes, The Scene, De Mens, Arid, Anouk, Joe Cocker, Soulwax, Beck

== Marktrock 2001 ==
- 19th edition
- Lineup: Judith, Voice Male, Jukebox 2000, The Bomfunk MCs, Krezip, Lords of Acid, El Tattoo del Tigre, The Dallas Explosion, Twarres, Laïs, Eagle-Eye Cherry, Travis, Emmi, Mauro, Das Pop, Wheatus, Finley Quaye, Frank Black and the Catholics, Fun Lovin' Criminals, James Brown, Bastian

== Marktrock 2002 ==
- 20th edition
- Lineup: Patsy, Sita, Turn on Tina, Clouseau, Joost Zweegers, Arid, Les Truttes, Flip Kowlier, Arno, Simple Minds, Kosheen, Neeka, Daan, Starflam, Zornik, Therapy?, Natalie Imbruglia, Counting Crows, Elvis Costello

== Marktrock 2003 ==
- 21st edition
- Lineup: 5 Days Off, Admiral Freebee, Aldona, Anouk, Aptijt, Babyjohn, Ballroom Quartet, Bende Gek, BJ Scott, Boogie Wonderband, Boudewijn de Groot, Brainpower, Camden Does Police, Charlie 54, Creams & Spices, Daan, Dave Edmunds, De Mens, Disco Nouveau Band, Discobar Galaxie, Elysian, Foger-T, Gabriel Ríos, Hale-Bopp, Heather Nova, Indigo Ratz, JMX ft. Tikiman, Kasper van Kooten, Ketnet Band, Krewcial, Krezip, K's Choice, Lemon, Luc van Acker, Lunascape, Magical Flying Thunderbirds, Mama's Day Off, Mama's Jasje, Mauro Pawlowski & The Grooms, Mo'Jones, Moloko, Monsoon, Myslovitz, Old Bastards, Orquesta Vibes, Ozark Henry, Plane Vanilla, Postmen, Pyriet, Queensize Quagmire, Raffaele, Relax, Ronny Mosuse, Satellite City, Sananda Maitreya, Sergio & The Big Bang, Sioen, Soulbob, Spark, Speedball Jr., 't Hof van Commerce, The Cardigans, The Crox, The Pretenders, de Snevo's, Triggerfinger, Tumblin' Dice, Tydal, Ultrasonic + live guests, Urban Trad, Vankatoen, Vive La Fête, W817 Band, Yasmine en Zuco 103.

== Marktrock 2004 ==
- 22nd edition
- over 350,000 people in 3 days (13–15 August 2004)
- 3 free stages (Vismarkt, M. De Layensplein, Hogeschoolplein)
- 1 stage requiring a €15 entrance fee (Oude Markt)
- Line-up: A Brand, Arsenal, Bal des Boiteux, The Ballroomquartet, Belle Perez, Xander de Buisonjé, Discobar Galaxie, Durango, El Tattoo Del Tigre, Eskobar, The Fundamentals, Funeral Dress, Goose, Gruppo Sportivo, Hooverphonic, Hermanos Inglesos, Junkie XL, Kane, Flip Kowlier, de Kreuners, Leki, The Magical Flying Thunderbirds, Mint, Mintzkov Luna, Monza, Nailpin, Natalia, Novastar, Oversized, Bart Peeters, Plastyc Buddha, Praga Khan, The Rasmus, The Real Ones, Axelle Red, Lou Reed, Gabriel Ríos, Roland & Robyn, Roxanne, Savanastation, Silverene, Sioen, Spring, Superdiesel, Sweet Coffee, Thou, Triggerfinger, Les Truttes, Venus In Flames, Wazzda, X!NK, Z, Zornik

== Marktrock 2005 ==
- 23rd edition
- ~300,000 people in 3 days (13–15 August 2005)
- 3 free stages (Vismarkt, M. De Layensplein, Hogeschoolplein)
- 1 stage requiring a 15 euro entrance fee (Oude Markt)
- Line-up: Absynthe Minded, Admiral Freebee, Arsenal, Bird, Dirk Blanchart, Bolster, Boogie & The Woogies, Coco Jr., Cookies & Cream, Cream & Spices, Craig David, De La Vega, Dead Souls, DJ Tiësto, Estelle, Peter Evrard, Joeri Fransen, Freestylers, Geiko, The Germans, Goddam!, Sven Van Hees, Tom Helsen, Bart Herman, Hètten Dès, The Human League, Hermanos Inglesos, Janez Detd., The Kids, Kill Spector, Beverley Knight, Krezip, Larry, Lester, Linus, Mala Vita, Marktrock Tribute Band & Guests, Michael Franti & Spearhead, The Midnight Groovers, MoGroove, Mud Flow, Mutemath, Nid & Sancy, Off the Record, Ontpopt, Gabriel Ríos, Satellite City, The Selecter, Sofie & So Four, Wim Soutaer, Stash, Stijn, Swinnen, Texas, Ultrasonic 7, The Van Jets, Van Sant P., Vaya Con Dios, Wazzda, Wézon, William Reven & Groove Garden, Wilson, Woods, X!NK, The Young Presleas, Youngblood Brass Band, Zornik

== Marktrock 2006 ==
- 24th edition
- 250,000 people in 3 days (13–15 August 2006)
- 3 free stages (Vismarkt, M. De Layensplein, Hogeschoolplein)
- 1 stage requiring a 25 euro entrance fee (Oude Markt) - first year in MarkRock history they accepted pre-orders for entrance tickets to the "Oude Markt" stage.
- Line-up "Oude Markt": Sandrine, Postman, Björn Again, Bloodhound Gang, Iggy Pop & The Stooges, Gavin DeGraw, Stereo MCs, Angie Stone, Daan, Pet Shop Boys, Studio Brussel Party with Discobar Galaxie, Lalalover, Body Count ft. Ice-T, Sarah Bettens, Sugababes, Starsailor
- Line-up free stages: Nona Mez, Skeemz, Racoon, Anton Walgrave, Dear Leader, Metal Molly, Mint, Savalas, Venus in Flames, Bettie Serveert, Triggerfinger, Buscemi Live, Gem, Woodface, Bunny, Sweet Coffee, Shameboy, Larsson, The Hendrix Files, Reborn, Belpop Bastards, Ronny Mosuse, Sanctum, Milow, The Incredible Time Machine, Kraak & Smaak, Roland, Junior Jazz, Ellroy, Liset Alea, Mo & Grazz, Treble, Paul Michiels, Lenny & de Wespen, Moonshine Playboys, Krezi Mizik, Catherine Feeny, Soul Rebel Salute, Ello, Buurman, Ialma, Triple Kay, Neeka, Het Zesde Metaal, Blunk, Daniel Romeo, Internationals, Guido Belcanto

== Marktrock 2007 ==
- 25th edition
- 3 days (10–12 August 2007)
- Official sponsors: Telenet, Inbev (Stella Artois), Dexia (Axion), Het Laatste Nieuws, Groep T, JIMtv, Studio Brussel, Nationale Loterij, ResPlus, Coca-Cola, Katholieke Universiteit Leuven.
- 2 stages: "Ladeuzeplein" (entrance 30EUR (pre-sale 25EUR for 1day, 65EUR for 3days)) and "Oude Markt" (entrance 20EUR (pre-sale 15EUR for 1 day, 38EUR for 3 days))
- Line-up "Ladeuzeplein": Friday 10 August: Milow, Zita Swoon, Erykah Badu, Snoop Dogg, Jan Van Biesen | Saturday 11 August: The Scene, Bart Peeters, Morcheeba, Nile Rodgers & Chic, STUBRU WAS HET NU ’70-’80 of ’90 ? | Sunday 12 August: Kosheen, Gabriel Ríos, Kanye West, Axelle Red, The 4T Four & Guests
- Line-up "Oude Markt": Friday 10 August: Nunan, Tom Helsen, Fixkes, Absynthe Minded, Arid, Shameboy | Saturday 11 August: Yevgueni, A Brand, Sioen, Vive la Fête, Zornik, Magnus | Sunday 12 August: Tripoli, Mintzkov, Ex-Drummer, Stijn, Daan, Discobar Galaxie
