= Night of the Proms =

Annual series of concerts in Europe

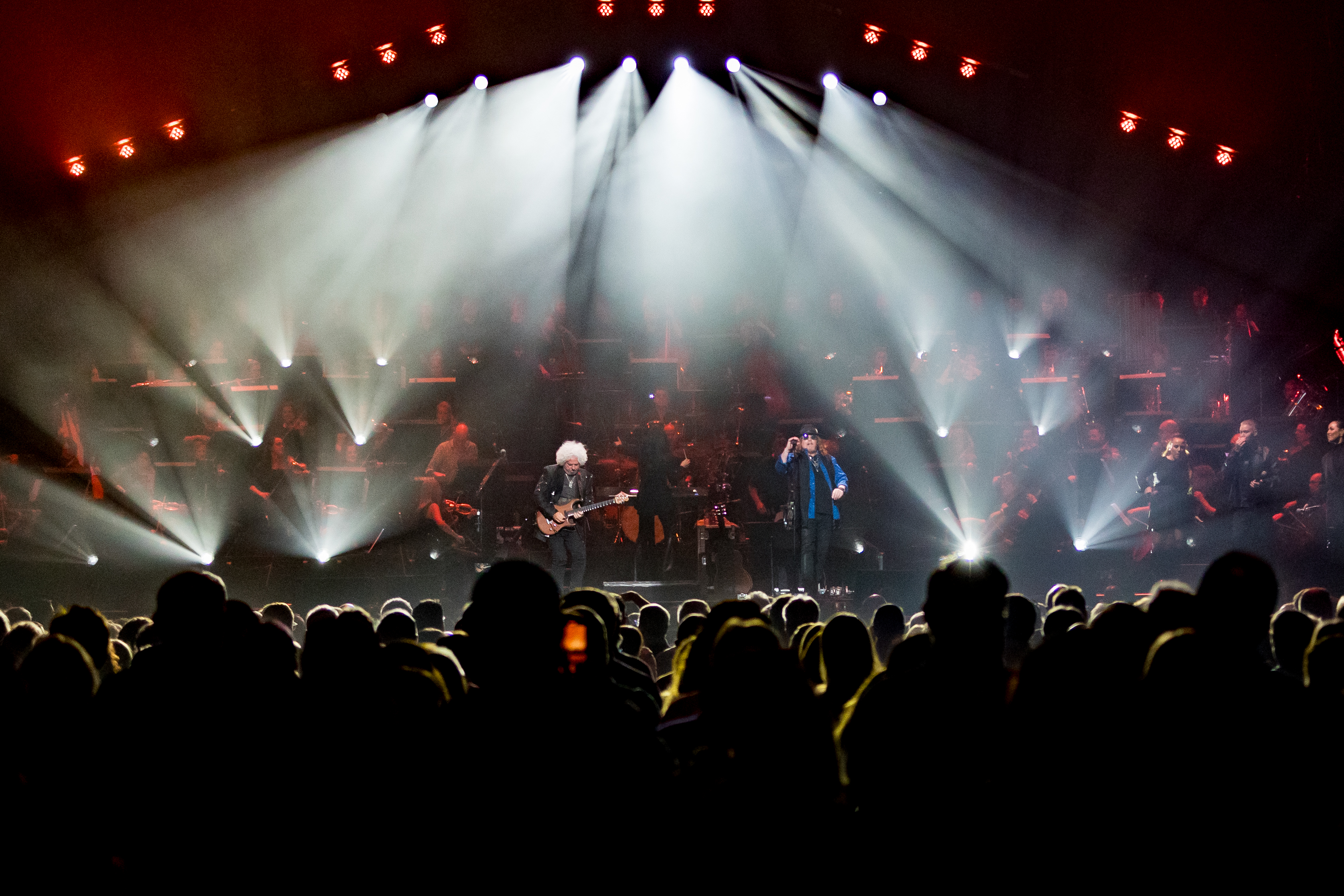
- Toto at the 2023 edition
- Date: October–December
- Venue: Various
- Location: Various locations
- Type: Concert series
- Website: Belgium; Germany

Night of the Proms is a series of concerts held annually in Belgium (since 1985), the Netherlands, Germany and Luxembourg. Regularly there are also shows in France, Spain, Austria, Switzerland, Poland, Denmark, the United States and Sweden. The concerts consist of pop music and popular classical music (often combined) and various well-known musicians and groups usually participate (see below).

Night of the Proms is the biggest annually organised indoor event in Europe.

Night of the Proms is based on the Last Night of the Proms, the last concert of the BBC Proms, a series of seventy or so classical concerts held yearly in the Royal Albert Hall in London, but it is organised independently. Though its inclusion of large portions of pop music does not match its British counterpart and originator, it did share certain elements for a time, such as the tradition of ending the performance with the English patriotic song "Land of Hope and Glory." The closing song has varied every year since 2011.

== History ==
Night of the Proms was created by two Belgian students, Jan Vereecke and Jan Van Esbroeck in 1985. The first NotP took place at the Antwerp Sportpaleis in Belgium on 19 October 1985. Nowadays the event is organized by PSE Belgium (Promotion for Special Events), still managed by Vereecke and Van Esbroeck. PSE co-operates with local promoters (Mojo in the Netherlands, Dirk Hohmeyer in Germany, Niels Estrup in Scandinavia, Music Events Poland, etc.).

== Musicians ==
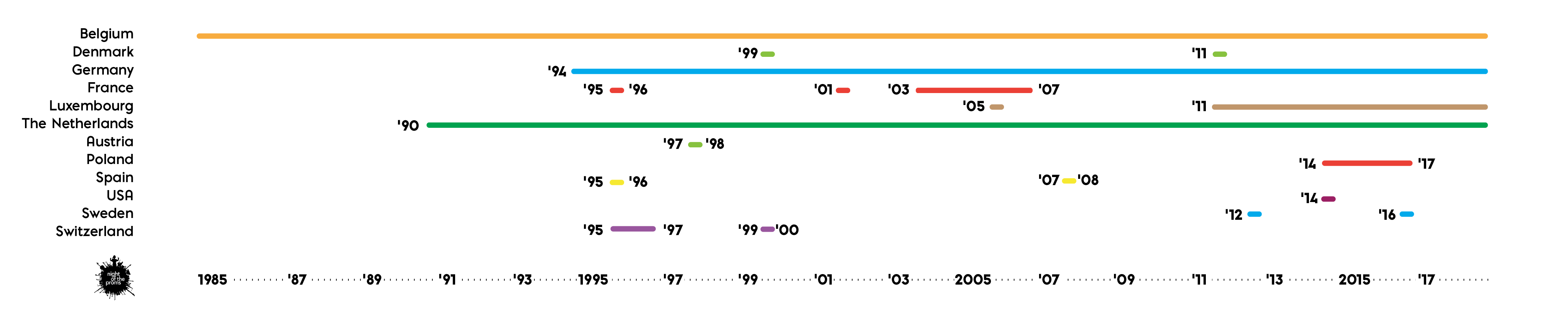
Night of the Proms location by country and year

Musicians who have participated in The Night of the Proms:

- Orchestra: Il Novecento (1991–2016), Antwerp Philharmonic Orchestra (since 2016)
- Conductor: Emil Tchakarov (1985), Günter Neuhold (1986-1988), Roland Kieft and Carlo Savina (moviethemes) (1989), Rudolf Werthen (1990), Robert Groslot (1991-2015), Alexandra Arrieche (since 2015)
- Choir: Fine Fleur (since 1995, except 2008, 2012 & 2015), Harlem Gospel Choir (2008), Naturally 7 (2012), Scala (2015), Lodz University of Technology Academic Choir (since 2014, concerts in Poland)
- 10CC (2008)
- Abel (2000)
- Ace of Base (2005)
- Adiemus (Karl Jenkins) (2001)
- Al Jarreau (1995)
- Al Stewart (1988)
- Alan Parsons (1990, 1997, 2008 & 2009, 2019)
- Alessandro Safina (2000)
- Alice Cooper (2025)
- Alison Moyet (2009 & 2011)
- Allan Olsen (2011)
- Alphaville (2002)
- Amy MacDonald (2013 & 2014)
- Ana Torroja (Mecano) (2007)
- Anastacia (2012, 2023)
- Andrea Bocelli (1995)
- Angelo Branduardi (1986)
- Anggun (2006)
- Angie Stone (2011)
- Art Garfunkel (Simon & Garfunkel) (1987, 1989 & 2012)
- Barry Hay (Golden Earring) (2010)
- Barry Ryan (1993)
- Basement Jaxx (2015)
- Beach Boys (2015)
- Belinda Carlisle (1994)
- Beverley Craven (1991)
- Björn Again (1994)
- Blanche (2017)
- Bonnie Tyler (2001 & 2002)
- Boudewijn de Groot (1995)
- Boy George (2010)
- Bryan Ferry (Roxy Music) (1995)
- Camouflage (band) (2023)
- CeeLo Green (2014)
- Chaka Khan (2016)
- Charlie Siem (2010)
- Chico and the Gypsies (2005, 2006 & 2007)
- Chimène Badi (2005)
- Chris De Burgh (2001)
- Chrissie Hynde (The Pretenders) (2000)
- Christina Stürmer (2009)
- Christophe Willem (2007)
- Christopher Cross (1992)
- Cliff Richard (2010)
- Clouseau (1995, 1999, 2000, 2002, 2003 & 2004, 2023)
- Colin Blunstone (1993)
- Coolio (1997, 2000 & 2014)
- Cunnie Williams (2003)
- Cutting Crew (Nick Van Eede) (2002)
- Cyndi Lauper (2004)
- Damian Draghici (2004 & 2005)
- Dani Klein (Vaya Con Dios) (1996)
- David Garrett (2002 & 2003)
- De Kreuners (2003)
- Deborah Harry (Blondie) (1997)
- Dennis DeYoung (Styx) (2008)
- Die Prinzen (1996)
- Di-Rect (2007)
- DJ Bobo (2004)
- Donna Summer (2005 & 2007)
- Emilia (1999)
- Emily Bear (2017)
- Emma Shapplin (1998)
- En Vogue (2003)
- Faudel (2006)
- Fernando Varela (2015)
- Florent Pagny (2003)
- Foreigner (2002)
- Frank Boeijen (1993 & 2005)
- Gabriel Rios (2016)
- Gary Brooker (Procol Harum) (1993)
- Gavin DeGraw (2015)
- Gérard Lenorman (2001, 2004 & 2009)
- Gers Pardoel (2017)
- Gloria Estefan (2013)
- Grace Jones (2010)
- Grzegorz Skawiński (Kombii) (2015)
- Guo Yue (1996)
- Harry Sacksioni (1986)
- Heaven 17 (2009)
- Hiromi (2013)
- Höhner (1998)
- Hooverphonic (2014)
- Howard Jones (2000)
- Huey Lewis (2003)
- I Muvrini (2006 & 2007)
- Ian Bairnson (1997)
- Igudesman & Joo (2008 & 2009)
- Ike Turner (2006)
- Ilse DeLange (2003)
- INXS (2003)
- James Blunt (2011)
- James Brown (2004)
- Jenifer (2006)
- Jennifer Warnes (1992)
- Jeroen Van Der Boom (2008)
- Jo Lemaire (1997)
- Joe Cocker (1992, 1996 & 2004)
- Joe Jackson (2015)
- Johan Verminnen (1999)
- John Fogerty (CCR) (2010)
- John Miles (1985 - 2019)
- John Miles Jr. (2022)
- Joss Stone (2017, 2025)
- Julie Zenatti (2003)
- Katie Melua (2014 & 2015)
- Katona Twins (2009)
- Kenny Loggins (2014)
- Kid Creole & the Coconuts (2007 & 2010)
- Kiki Dee (2002)
- Kim Wilde (2008, 2010, 2011 & 2015)
- Laith Al-Deen (2001 & 2007)
- Lara Fabian (2006 & 2007)
- Laura Tesoro (2016)
- Laurent Voulzy (2010)
- Lisa Stansfield (1998)
- Live (2008)
- Luc De Vos (Gorki) (2005)
- Luc Ponet (1993)
- Macy Gray (2007)
- Madeline Juno (2014)
- Manfred Mann & Chris Thompson (2005)
- Manuel Barrueco (1994)
- Marco Borsato (2001, 2002 & 2003)
- Mark King (Level 42) (1998, 2013 & 2015)
- Marlon Roudette (Mattafix) (2014)
- Martin Fry (ABC) (2001)
- Mateusz Ziolko (2014)
- Meat Loaf (2001)
- Melanie C (2017)
- Michael McDonald (Doobie Brothers) (2002 & 2014)
- Michel Delpech (2003)
- Mick Hucknall (Simply Red) (2011)
- Midge Ure (Ultravox) (2005, 2008 & 2009, 2025)
- Miguel Ríos (2008)
- Mike Oldfield (2006 & 2007)
- Milow (2018 & 2019)
- Mimie Mathy (2006)
- Miriam Stockley (2006)
- Morten Harket (A-ha) (2013)
- Münchener Freiheit (1998)
- Murray Head (2007)
- Natalia (2003 & 2005)
- Natalia Kukulska (2014)
- Natalie Choquette (1999, 2004 & 2014)
- Natalie Imbruglia (2015)
- Natasha Bedingfield (2016)
- Natasha St-Pier (2005)
- Nena (2000)
- Nicole Croisille (1990)
- Nile Rodgers & Chic (2007, 2011 & 2014)
- Ole Edvard Antonsen (1998)
- Oleta Adams (1996)
- OMD (2006, 2008, 2009, 2014 & 2015)
- Patrick Fiori (2004)
- Patti Russo (2001)
- Paul Carrack (2007)
- Paul Michiels (1996, 1999; and 2007 as Soulsister with Jan Leyers)
- Paul Young (1994 & 1997)
- Peter Cetera (2017)
- Peter Koelewijn (1998)
- Petra Berger (2002)
- Petrit Çeku (2018)
- Pointer Sisters (2002, 2004 & 2014)
- Randy Crawford (1991 & 2003)
- Raymond van het Groenewoud (1992 & 2000)
- Rob de Nijs (2001 & 2002)
- Robin Gibb (The Bee Gees) (2008)
- Roby Lakatos (2007)
- Roch Voisine (2004)
- Roger Daltrey (The Who) (2005)
- Roger Hodgson (Supertramp) (1991, 1995, 2004 & 2017)
- Ronan Keating (2016)
- Rose Royce (2001)
- Roxette (2009)
- Safri Duo (2005, 2025)
- Sam Sparro (2014)
- Seal (2005, 2011 & 2018)
- Shaggy (2004)
- Sharon Den Adel (Within Temptation) (2009)
- Simple Minds (1997, 2002, 2008, 2011 and 2016)
- Sinéad O'Connor (2008)
- Soulsister (2007)
- Starship (band) (2024)
- Status Quo (1999 & 2003)
- Steve Harley (Cockney Rebel) (1991)
- Sting (1993)
- Suzanne Vega (2018)
- Tears for Fears (2006, 2007 & 2008)
- Texas (2006 & 2010)
- The Baseballs (2013)
- The Flying Pickets (1990)
- Thé Lau (The Scene) (2005)
- Thijs van Leer (Focus) (1985)
- Time for Three (2016)
- Tina Arena (2006)
- Tom Chaplin (2016)
- Tony Hadley (Spandau Ballet) (1996 & 2004)
- Tony Henry (2006, 2007 & 2015)
- Toots Thielemans (1985 & 2009)
- Toto (1994 & 2003 & 2023)
- Twarres (2002)
- UB40 (2000 & 2006)
- Udo (2006)
- Van Dik Hout (2004)
- Vincent Niclo (2006)
- Waylon (2013)
- Wayne Marshall (1997)
- Wet Wet Wet (1998)
- Will Tura (1993 & 2000)
- Wyclef Jean (The Fugees) (2013)
- Xuefei Yang (2003)
- Zucchero (1999, 2004, 2005, 2014 & 2016)
- Benny Wiame (1992)
- Bo Saris (2014)
- City to City (1999)
- Daniël Blumenthal (1991)
- De Kast (1999)
- Div4s (2010 & 2011)
- Emma Schmidt (1987)
- Erik Mesie (Toontje Lager) (2008)
- Galileo (2003 & 2008)
- Gunther Verspecht (Stash) (2008)
- Henk Temming (Het Goede Doel) (1998)
- Isabelle A (2017)
- Jasper Steverlinck (Arid) (2006)
- Johannes Genard (2017)
- Johannes Oerding (2015)
- Kamiel Spiessens (1996)
- Katichiri Feys (2008)
- Kid Safari (1998)
- Konstantin Stoianov (1988)
- Ksenija Sidorova (2014)
- Lichtmond (2010)
- Liebrecht Vanbeckevoort (2007)
- Nubya (2005)
- PUR (2007)
- Purple Schultz (1999)
- Rafał Brzozowski (2015)
- Robert Groslot (1987)
- Rosa Cedrón (2007)
- Ruth Jaccot (2006)
- Stijn Meuris (1999)
- Theo Mertens (1986, 1989 & 1992)
- Thomas Vanderveken (2017)
- Tom Helsen (2008)
- Total Touch (1997)
- Wendy Van Wanten (1998)
- William Dunker (2008)
