= Idool 2003 =

- Season 2003
- Hosted by: Koen Wauters; Kris Wauters
- Judges: Jean Beaute; Nina De Man; Jan Leyers; Bart Brusseleers
- Winner: Peter Evrard
- Runner-up: Natalia Druyts

Release
- Original network: VTM
- Original release: 3 January – 9 May 2003

Season chronology
- Next → Idool 2004

Idool 2003 was the first season of the Belgian version of the Idol series. It was won by Peter Evrard, and followed by Idool 2004. The series was officially launched on 28 September 2002 by Belgian television network VTM. The hosts of the show are Koen & Kris Wauters of the group Clouseau. The jury members were Jean Blaute, Nina De Man, Jan Leyers & Bart Brusseleers.

== About ==
Auditions were held across Flanders in Antwerp, Ghent & Brussels where 100 candidates were chosen to advance to the theatre rounds in Brussels where they were cut to 50 contestants (five groups of ten) to perform live in a piano round semi final, two contestants from each semi final advanced to the liveshows with a studio audience. On 9 May 2003 Peter Evrard from Beerse won with runner up Natalia Druyts placing second. Finalist Carolin Vyncke, who was pregnant during the contest, named her daughter (who was born later that year) Nina, after jury member Nina De Man.

This season of Idool is also notable having produced so far 3 popular Belgian recording artists in the semi-finals:

- Hadise Açıkgöz
- Udo Mechels – winner of The X Factor.
- Johan Waem – popularly known by his stage name, Danzel.

In 2006, the finalists of Idool 2003 are still enjoying success in their country compared to how quickly other countries' Idol competitors last in the music industry. As of July 2006, Peter, Danzel & Udo still have records in the Ultratop 50 singles chart with Wim & Brahim releasing their new CDs in the last month also. But non-of these can hold the massive success Natalia still has.

Several of the Idool 2003 contestants tried out on the Flemish-Belgian Pre-Selection for the Eurovision Song Contest to represent their country and although some of them came quite close, none of them really made it. However Hadise Açıkgöz, who did not made the top 50 but failed to advance to the final 10, represented Turkey in 2009 making her the second contestant from a very successful Idol show to do so, after Jessica Garlick who represented the United Kingdom after appearing in Pop Idol.

== Finals ==
=== Finalists ===
Finalist	Age *	From	Status
Stéphanie Lambrechts	16	Kessel-Lo	Eliminated 1st in Week 1
Tabitha Cycon	18	Hasselt	Eliminated 2nd in Week 2
Caroline Vyncke	27	Ostend	Eliminated 3rd in Week 3
Cindy Huysentruit	24	Oudenaarde	Eliminated 4th in Week 4
Tom Olaerts	25	Genk	Eliminated 5th in Week 5
Chris D. Morton	24	Ghent	Eliminated 6th in Week 6
Brahim Attaeb	19	Torhout	Eliminated 7th in Week 7
Wim Soutaer	28	Halle	Eliminated 8th in Week 8
Natalia Druyts	22	Geel	Runner-up
Peter Evrard	28	Beerse	Winner

* as of the start of the season

== Heats and live shows ==
=== Results summary ===
Legend
Did Not Perform	Female	Male	Top 50	Top 10	Winner

Safe	Safe First	Safe Last	Eliminated

Stage:		Semi					Finals								
Week:		02/07	02/14	02/21	02/28	03/07	03/14	03/21	03/28	04/04	04/11	04/18	04/25	05/02	05/11
Place	Contestant	Result													
1	Peter Evrard				1st										Winner
2	Natalia Druyts			2nd											Runner-Up
3	Wim Soutaer		2nd				Btm 3			Btm 2				Elim	
4	Brahim Attaeb			1st									Elim		
5	Chris D Morton					1st			Btm 2		Btm 2	Elim			
6	Tom Olaerts					2nd					Elim				
7	Cindy Huysentruit	2nd					Btm 2	Btm 2	Btm 3	Elim					
8	Caroline Vyncke				2nd			Btm 3	Elim						
9	Tabitha Cycon		1st					Elim							
10	Stéphanie Lambrechts	1st					Elim								
Semi- Final 5	Alexander Mertens					Elim									
Semi- Final 5	Evelien Scheerlinck					Elim									
Semi- Final 5	Floor Van Egghen					Elim									
Semi- Final 5	Iris De Rijcker					Elim									
Semi- Final 5	Isabelle Ross					Elim									
Semi- Final 5	Kim Tolleneer					Elim									
Semi- Final 5	Udo Mechels					Elim									
Semi- Final 5	Veerle Dauwen					Elim									
Semi- Final 4	Anky De Frangh				Elim										
Semi- Final 4	Bert Finaut				Elim										
Semi- Final 4	Dimitri Vantomme				Elim										
Semi- Final 4	Johan Waem				Elim										
Semi- Final 4	Kim Van Kuyk				Elim										
Semi- Final 4	Leentje Van Kerckhoven				Elim										
Semi- Final 4	Lies Vercruysse				Elim										
Semi- Final 4	Liv Goethals				Elim										
Semi- Final 3	Dave Beijer			Elim											
Semi- Final 3	Elfie Strackx			Elim											
Semi- Final 3	Eva Maes			Elim											
Semi- Final 3	Laura Ramaekers			Elim											
Semi- Final 3	Lindsey Marie Clare			Elim											
Semi- Final 3	Philippe Sysmans			Elim											
Semi- Final 3	Sarah-Marie Budts			Elim											
Semi- Final 3	Sofie Plateau			Elim											
Semi- Final 2	Andy Huylebroeck		Elim												
Semi- Final 2	Claudia Bertotto		Elim												
Semi- Final 2	David Heymans		Elim												
Semi- Final 2	Hadise Açıkgöz		Elim												
Semi- Final 2	Natalie Schoonbaert		Elim												
Semi- Final 2	Paco Garcia		Elim												
Semi- Final 2	Sandra Pluys		Elim												
Semi- Final 2	Vicky Cosijns		Elim												
Semi- Final 1	Astrid Roelants	Elim													
Semi- Final 1	Jürgen Coppieters	Elim													
Semi- Final 1	Kristof Van Den Bergh	Elim													
Semi- Final 1	Marleen Janssens	Elim													
Semi- Final 1	Michael Pfeiffer	Elim													
Semi- Final 1	Peter Strackx	Elim													
Semi- Final 1	Severine Devadder	Elim													
Semi- Final 1	Sofie Vanlimbergen	Elim													

=== Live show details ===
==== Heat 1 (31 January 2003) ====
Artist	Song (original artists)	Result
Astrid Roelants	"Black Velvet" (Alannah Myles)	Eliminated
Cindy Huisentruit	"A Thousand Miles" (Vanessa Carlton)	Advanced
Jürgen Coppieters	"Don't Let the Sun Go Down on Me" (Elton John)	Eliminated
Kristof Van Den Bergh	"Sorry Seems to Be the Hardest Word" (Elton John)	Eliminated
Marleen Janssens	"Angels" (Robbie Williams)	Eliminated
Michael Pfeiffer	"Nikita" (Elton John)	Eliminated
Pieter Strackx	"She's the One" (Robbie Williams)	Eliminated
Severine Devadder	"Stop!" (Sam Brown)	Eliminated
Sofie Vanlimbergen	"Fame" (Irene Cara)	Eliminated
Stéphanie Lambrechts	"La solitudine" (Laura Pausini)	Advanced

==== Heat 2 (7 February 2003) ====
Artist	Song (original artists)	Result
Andy Huylebroeck	"His Eye Is on the Sparrow" (Lauryn Hill & Tanya Blount)	Eliminated
Claudia Bertotto	"Foolish Games" (Jewel)	Eliminated
David Heymans	"Knock on Wood" (Amii Stewart)	Eliminated
Hadise Açıkgöz	"Beautiful" (Christina Aguilera)	Eliminated
Nathalie Schoonbaert	"Do That to Me One More Time" (Captain & Tennille)	Eliminated
Paco Garcia	"Kon ik maar even bij je zijn" (Gordon Heuckeroth)	Eliminated
Sandra Pluys	"Life Goes On" (LeAnn Rimes)	Eliminated
Tabitha Cycon	"All Cried Out" (Allure)	Advanced
Vicky Cosijns	"Eternal Flame" (The Bangles)	Eliminated
Wim Soutaer	"Honesty" (Billy Joel)	Advanced

==== Heat 3 (14 February 2003) ====
Artist	Song (original artists)	Result
Brahim Attaeb	"U Remind Me" (Usher)	Advanced
David Beijer	"Feel" (Robbie Williams)	Eliminated
Elfie Strackx	"What's Up" (4 Non Blondes)	Eliminated
Eva Maes	"Like the Way I Do" (Melissa Etheridge)	Eliminated
Laura Ramaekers	"Love Is Alive" ()	Eliminated
Lindsey Marie Clare	"Stronger" ()	Eliminated
Natalia Druyts	"When You Believe" (Mariah Carey & Whitney Houston)	Advanced
Philippe Sysmans	"Respect" (Aretha Franklin)	Eliminated
Sarah-Marie Budts	"A Song for You" (Donny Hathaway)	Eliminated
Sofie Plateau	"Gold" ()	Eliminated

==== Heat 4 (21 February 2003) ====
Artist	Song (original artists)	Result
Anky De Frangh	"Dream a Little Dream of Me" (Mama Cass)	Eliminated
Bert Finaut	"When Susannah Cries" (Espen Lind)	Eliminated
Caroline Vyncke	"There You'll Be" (Faith Hill)	Advanced
Dimitri Van Tomme	"When I Need You" (Leo Sayer)	Eliminated
Johan Waem	"If Tomorrow Never Comes" (Ronan Keating)	Eliminated
Kim Van Kuyk	"Can't Fight the Moonlight" (LeAnn Rimes)	Eliminated
Leentje Van Kerckhoven	"River Deep – Mountain High" (Tina Turner)	Eliminated
Lies Vercruysse	"Perfect" ()	Eliminated
Liv Goethals	"Don't Know Why" (Norah Jones)	Eliminated
Peter Evrard	"How You Remind Me" (Nickelback)	Advanced

==== Heat 5 (28 February 2003) ====
Artist	Song (original artists)	Result
Alexander Mertens	"Wherever You Will Go" (The Calling)	Eliminated
Chris Morton	"Hello" (Lionel Richie)	Advanced
Evelien Scheerlinck	"From Sarah with Love" (Sarah Connor)	Eliminated
Floor Van Egghen	"Colors of the Wind" (Vanessa Williams)	Eliminated
Iris De Rijcker	"Life on Mars" (David Bowie)	Eliminated
Isabelle Ross	"Honey, I'm Home" (Shania Twain)	Eliminated
Kim Tolleneer	"Promise Me" (Beverley Craven)	Eliminated
Tom Olaerts	"The Best Is Yet to Come" (Novastar)	Advanced
Udo Mechels	"Only the Very Best" (Peter Kingsbery)	Eliminated
Veerle Dauwen	"Wind Beneath My Wings" (Bette Midler)	Eliminated

==== Live Show 1 (14 March 2003) ====
Theme: My Idol

Artist	Song (original artists)	Result
Brahim Attaeb	"No Diggity" (Blackstreet)	Safe
Caroline Vyncke	"Bed of Roses" (Bon Jovi)	Safe
Chris Morton	"Every Breath You Take" (The Police)	Safe
Cindy Huisentruit	"I'm with You" (Avril Lavigne)	Bottom two
Natalia Druyts	"I Wanna Dance with Somebody (Who Loves Me)" (Whitney Houston)	Safe
Peter Evrard	"Lithium" (Nirvana)	Safe
Stephanie Lambrechts	"Waiting for Tonight" (Jennifer Lopez)	Eliminated
Tabitha Cycon	"Hero" (Mariah Carey)	Safe
Tom Olaerts	"Sweet Instigator" (Ozark Henry)	Safe
Wim Soutaer	"Drops of Jupiter (Tell Me)" (Train)	Bottom three

==== Live Show 2 (21 March 2003) ====
Theme: 80s Hits

Artist	Song (original artists)	Result
Brahim Attaeb	"Red Red Wine" (UB40)	Safe
Caroline Vyncke	"If I Could Turn Back Time" (Cher)	Bottom three
Chris Morton	"I Want to Break Free" (Queen)	Safe
Cindy Huisentruit	"Heaven" (Bryan Adams)	Bottom two
Natalia Druyts	"I'm So Excited" (The Pointer Sisters)	Safe
Peter Evrard	"If You Don't Know Me by Now" (Simply Red)	Safe
Tabitha Cycon	"The Way to Your Heart" (Soulsister)	Eliminated
Tom Olaerts	"Dance Little Sister" (Terence Trent D'Arby)	Safe
Wim Soutaer	"With or Without You" (U2)	Safe

==== Live Show 3 (28 March 2003) ====
Theme: Dutch Songs

Artist	Song (original artists)	Result
Brahim Attaeb	"32 jaar (Sinds 1 dag of 2)" (Doe Maar)	Safe
Caroline Vyncke	"Je hoeft niet naar huis vannacht" (Marco Borsato)	Eliminated
Chris Morton	"Papa" (Stef Bos)	Bottom two
Cindy Huisentruit	"Onderweg" (Abel)	Bottom three
Natalia Druyts	"De roos" (Ann Christy)	Safe
Peter Evrard	"Van god los" (Monza)	Safe
Tom Olaerts	"Iedereen is van de wereld" (The Scene)	Safe
Wim Soutaer	"Afscheid" (Volumia!)	Safe

==== Live Show 4 (4 April 2003) ====
Theme: Film Songs

Artist	Song (original artists)	Result
Brahim Attaeb	"My Girl" (The Temptations)	Safe
Chris Morton	"Ice Ice Baby" (Vanilla Ice)	Safe
Cindy Huisentruit	"Sweet Home Alabama" (Lynyrd Skynyrd)	Eliminated
Natalia Druyts	"Think" (Aretha Franklin)	Safe
Peter Evrard	"Hero" (Chad Kroeger)	Safe
Tom Olaerts	"Kiss from a Rose" (Seal)	Safe
Wim Soutaer	"Iris" (Goo Goo Dolls)	Bottom two

==== Live Show 5 (11 April 2003) ====
Theme: Disco Fever

Artist	Song (original artists)	Result
Brahim Attaeb	"Sexual Healing" (Marvin Gaye)	Safe
Chris Morton	"Easy" (Commodores)	Bottom two
Natalia Druyts	"Blame It on the Boogie" (The Jacksons)	Safe
Peter Evrard	"Don't Walk Away" (Electric Light Orchestra)	Safe
Tom Olaerts	"Let's Groove" (Earth, Wind & Fire)	Safe
Wim Soutaer	"I Heard It Through the Grapevine" (Marvin Gaye)	Safe

==== Live Show 6 (18 April 2003) ====
Theme: Big Band

Artist	Song (original artists)	Result
Brahim Attaeb	"You Are the Sunshine of My Life" (Stevie Wonder)	Safe
Chris Morton	"Reet Petite" (Jackie Wilson)	Eliminated
Natalia Druyts	"It's Oh So Quiet" (Björk)	Safe
Peter Evrard	"Almost Like Being in Love" (Frank Sinatra)	Safe
Wim Soutaer	"Mack the Knife" (Bobby Darin)	Bottom two

==== Live Show 7 (25 April 2003) ====
Theme: Latino Hits

Artist	First song (original artists)	Second song	Result
Brahim Attaeb	"Annie, I'm Not Your Daddy" (Kid Creole and the Coconuts)	"Maria Maria" (Santana)	Eliminated
Natalia Druyts	"Conga" (Miami Sound Machine)	"Hijo de la luna" (Loona)	Safe
Peter Evrard	"Livin' la Vida Loca" (Ricky Martin)	"Se bastasse una canzone" (Eros Ramazzotti)	Safe
Wim Soutaer	"Hero" (Enrique Iglesias)	"Rhythm Divine" (Enrique Iglesias)	Bottom two

==== Live Show 8: Semi-final (2 May 2003) ====
Theme: Judge's Choice

Artist	First song (original artists)	Second song	Result
Natalia Druyts	"It's Raining Men" (The Weather Girls)	"(You Make Me Feel Like) A Natural Woman" (Aretha Franklin)	Safe
Peter Evrard	"Rockin' in the Free World" (Neil Young)	"Never Tear Us Apart" (INXS)	Safe
Wim Soutaer	"Blauw" (The Scene)	"Love Is All Around" (Wet Wet Wet)	Eliminated

==== Live final (9 May 2003) ====
Artist	First song	Second song	Third song	Result
Natalia Druyts	"Think"	"Without You"	"For You"	Runner-up
Peter Evrard	"Lithium"	"Have a Little Faith in Me"	"For You"	Winner
