= The Lead and How to Swing It =

Studio album by Tom Jones
- Released: 1994
- Studios: Sarm Hook End, Checkendon; River Sound, New York City; Sunset Sound, Los Angeles; The Complex, Los Angeles; Banana Boat, Burbank; Westlake Audio, Los Angeles; Gung Ho Recording, Eugene; The Village Recorder, Los Angeles; Future Records Recording, Virginia Beach; The Hit Factory, New York City; The Enterprise, Burbank; Wisseloord, Hilversum
- Labels: Interscope; ZTT; Atlantic
- Producers: Trevor Horn; Flood; Alan Moulder; Andy Wright; Richard Perry; Thom Panunzio; Youth; Teddy Riley; André Cymone; DJ Battlecat; Howard Johnson; Jeff Lynne; Howard Gray; Michael Allen; Andrew Gray; David Werner; Jan Leyers; Richard Feldman; John McClain (also exec. producer); Jimmy Iovine (exec. producer)

Tom Jones chronology
Carrying a Torch (1991)	The Lead and How to Swing It (1994)	Reload (1999)

Singles from The Lead and How to Swing It
- 1. "If I Only Knew" Released: 5 November 1994; 2. "I Wanna Get Back with You" Released: 1 April 1995

The Lead and How to Swing It is the 33rd studio album by the Welsh singer Tom Jones, released in 1994. It includes the singles "If I Only Knew", which reached number 11 in the UK singles chart, and "I Wanna Get Back with You", featuring Tori Amos, which reached number 94.

== Critical reception ==
Professional ratings
Review scores
Source	Rating
AllMusic	2/5 stars

In a review for AllMusic, Stephen Thomas Erlewine said that on The Lead and How to Swing It, Jones had recorded "with several of the hippest names in dance music" of that time. He described the album's title as "clumsy", and opined that the album is "neither true to Tom Jones' core audience nor appealing to Gen Xers, simply because it doesn't feature Jones doing what he does best — famous songs written by other people. Instead, it's a set of written-to-order dance numbers that are immaculately produced and sung, yet hardly engaging." He concluded the review by saying that the songs on the album are "devoid of the camp factor that made [Jones'] version of Prince's 'Kiss' so entertaining."

== Track listing ==
No.	Title	Writer(s)	Length
1.	"If I Only Knew"	Rise Robots Rise	4:08
2.	"A Girl Like You"	The Wolfgang Press: (Michael Allen; Mark Cox; Andrew Gray)	4:43
3.	"I Wanna Get Back with You" (featuring Tori Amos)	Diane Warren	5:00
4.	"Situation"	Vince Clarke; Alison Moyet	3:10
5.	"Something for Your Head"	Gardner Cole; André Cymone; Mic Murphy	5:12
6.	"Fly Away"	Teddy Riley; Carol Duboc; Levi Little	4:38
7.	"Love Is On Our Side"	Marshall Jefferson; Martin Glover	4:02
8.	"I Don't Think So"	D. J. Rogers; James Wright; Warryn S. Campbell II; Howard Johnson	5:19
9.	"Lift Me Up"	Jeff Lynne	3:45
10.	"Show Me"	Allen; Gray	3:51
11.	"I'm Ready"	Glover; Charlotte Kelly	4:11
12.	"Changes"	David Werner; Paul Michiels; Jan Leyers	4:04

== Personnel ==
Adapted from the album's liner notes.

=== Musicians ===
- Tom Jones – lead vocals (all tracks)
- Michael Allen – bass (track 2, 10)
- Tori Amos – backing vocals (track 3)
- Helen Andrew – backing vocals (track 1)
- David Ayres – guitar (track 11)
- Lisa Banks – backing vocals (track 8)
- Dave Bishop – tenor saxophone (track 10)
- Mildred Black – backing vocals (track 8)
- Antoinette Brown – backing vocals (track 8)
- Mike Campbell – guitar (track 3), bass (track 3)
- Warryn S. Campbell II – keyboards (track 8)
- Charlotte – backing vocals (track 11)
- Gardner Cole – backing vocals (track 5)
- Mark Cox – keyboards (track 10)
- Lalo Creme – guitar (track 1)
- Lol Creme – guitar (track 1), keyboards (track 1)
- André Cymone – backing vocals (track 5)
- Orsine Daan – backing vocals
- DJ Battlecat – keyboards (track 8), drum programming (track 8)
- Alice Echols – backing vocals (track 8)
- Simon Franglen – keyboards (track 3)
- Lisa Frazier – backing vocals (track 9)
- Simon Gardner – trumpet (track 10)
- Andrew Gray – guitar (track 2), guitars (track 10)
- Trevor Gray – Moog bass (track 10)
- Dave Hollister – backing vocals (track 5)
- Jim Horn – saxophone (track 9)
- Garry Hughes – keyboards (track 4, 11)
- Marshall Jefferson – keyboards (track 7)
- Howard Johnson – backing vocals (track 8)
- Stan "The Guitar Man" Jones – guitar (track 8)
- Katie Kissoon – backing vocals (track 1)
- Russ Kunkel – drums (track 3)
- Jan Leyers – backing vocals (track 12)
- Levi Little – backing vocals (track 5)
- Jeff Lynne – piano (track 9), guitars (track 9), keyboards (track 9), percussion (track 9), additional backing vocals (track 9)
- Cathy Merrick – backing vocals (track 9)
- Paul Michiels – backing vocals (track 12)
- Steve Monti – drums (track 2)
- Wendell A. Morrison Jr. – backing vocals
- Mic Murphy – backing vocals (track 5)
- Tessa Niles – backing vocals (track 1)
- Perla – backing vocals (track 12)
- Teddy Riley – backing vocals (tracks 5, 6)
- Guy Roche – keyboards (track 3)
- Owen Rossiter – drums (track 1)
- Michael Sanchez – Hammond organ (track 10)
- Neil Sidwell – trombone (track 10)
- Steve Sidwell – trumpet (track 10)
- Rose Stone – backing vocals (track 8)
- Craig Vear – drums (track 10)
- Bruce Woolley – backing vocals (track 1)

=== Technical ===
- Michael Allen – producer (track 10)
- Roland Alvares – assistant (track 3)
- Rob Chiarelli – mixing (track 8)
- Bob Clearmountain – mixing (track 3, 12)
- Bradley Cook – engineer (track 9)
- André Cymone – associate producer (track 5)
- DJ Battlecat – producer (track 8), mixing (track 8)
- Tom Elmhirst – assistant (track 1)
- Richard Feldman – vocal production (track 12)
- Steve Fitzmaurice – engineer (track 1)
- Flood – producer (track 2)
- Gus Garces – assistant (tracks 5, 6)
- Serban Ghenea – engineer (tracks 5, 6)
- Barry Goldberg – assistant (track 3)
- Andrew Gray – producer (track 10)
- Howard Gray – producer (track 10)
- John Haynes – engineer (tracks 5, 6)
- Trevor Horn – producer (track 1)
- Greg Hunter – mix engineer (track 7)
- Garry Hughes – programming (tracks 1, 4, 11)
- Jimmy Iovine – executive producer
- Marshall Jefferson – mixing (track 7)
- Howard Johnson – producer (track 8)
- David LaChapelle – photography
- Susan Leary – typographer
- Jan Leyers – producer (track 12)
- Jeff Lynne – producer (track 9)
- Liz Magro – engineer (track 8)
- Glen Marchese – assistant (tracks 5, 6)
- Stephen Marcussen – mastering
- Manny Marroquin – engineer (track 8)
- George Mayers – engineer (tracks 5, 6)
- John McClain – producer (track 8), executive producer)
- Alan Moulder – producer (track 2)
- Carl Napper – assistant (tracks 5, 6)
- Thom Panunzio – producer (track 3), engineer (track 3), remixing (track 12)
- Richard Perry – producer (tracks 3, 8)
- Tony Phillips – mixing (track 1)
- Mike Piersante – assistant (track 3)
- Chris Potter – engineer (tracks 4, 7, 11)
- Teddy Riley – producer (tracks 5, 6), mixing (tracks 5, 6)
- Alex Rodriguez – additional engineering (track 3)
- Richie "Vanilla" Rodriguez – digital editing (track 8)
- Matt Rowlands – programming (track 7)
- Mark Stebbeds – engineer (track 9)
- Susie Tallman – production manager
- Tracy Veal – art director/designer
- David Werner – producer (track 12)
- Andy Wright – producer (track 2)
- Youth – producer (tracks 4, 7, 11), mixing (tracks 4, 7, 11)
- Wayne Yurgelun – additional engineering (track 3)

== Charts ==
Chart performance for The Lead and How to Swing It
Chart (1994)	Peak position
Australian Albums (ARIA)	19
Finnish Albums (Suomen virallinen lista)	1
German Albums (Offizielle Top 100)	81
Swedish Albums (Sverigetopplistan)	31
UK Albums (Official Charts)	55
