= And Then Came Fall =

Belgian pop band

And Then Came Fall is a Belgian indie pop band with singer-songwriter roots based in Leuven, Belgium. Its members are Annelies Tanghe (vocals, guitar, keys, percussion) and Sam Pieter Janssens (guitar, bass, percussion, backing vocals, production). Annelies Tanghe and Sam Pieter Janssens have known each other from playing in bands before they started And Then Came Fall in 2017.

The band's first self-titled album, And Then Came Fall, was released on Starman Records on 1 February 2018. The album received critical acclaim.

On 14 February 2020, And Then Came Fall premiered a new single, Should We on their YouTube channel. This song would be the first single of a new upcoming album and the start of a live tour in March 2020 in support of Belgian rock band De Mens. However, the COVID-19 pandemic changed plans. Instead of releasing a new album Annelies Tanghe and Sam Pieter Janssens worked, both in their own homestudio, on a song called "Please Don't Disappear". Starman Records released the song on 7 April 2020. It featured on playlists on Spotify and got national airplay (Radio1, Studio Brussel).

== History ==
=== And Then Came Fall (2018, full album) ===
Annelies and Sam had been producing elaborated demos of their songs in the summer of 2016. The songs were re-recorded at La Patrie studio in Ghent, Belgium, during winter of 2016, together with producer Koen Gisen. Steven Van Gelder played drums and Jasper Hautekiet bass on the album tracks. The band's debut album eventually got printed on vinyl after raising funds via crowdfunding. And Then Came Fall signed up with Starman Records for promotion and distribution of the album. Rootstime.be about the record: "This could be the debut of the year!" Flemish daily newspaper De Standaard: "Strong melodies, lots of emotions about love and society and a beautiful mix of styles." Rockportaal.nl: "From Broken Circle Breakdown to Alabama Shakes: a beautiful mix of influences."

Since its release And Then Came Fall has been touring extensively throughout Belgium and The Netherlands. It is often Annelies Tanghe and Sam Pieter Janssens performing as a two-piece band. But And Then Came Fall performs also as a five-piece band, complemented with keys and backings (Eva Hautekiet), bass (Mathias Moors) and drums (Steven Van Gelder). And Then Came Fall supported many renowned international artists like as Joan As Police Woman, Sarah Blasko, Donavon Frankenreiter and K's Choice.

=== "Should We" (2020, single) ===
The band decided to release a new single on 14 February. And Then Came Fall celebrated its upcoming tour with Belgian rock band De Mens with new song "Should We". It was also the precursor of a forthcoming second album. "Once again", music blog Luminous Dash writes, "this music is of an emotional beauty with the taking lead voice of Annelies Tanghe."

=== "Please Don't Disappear" (2020, single) ===
During lockdown (March 2020) - when And Then Came Fall normally would have been on tour - Annelies Tanghe wrote a topical song about loneliness, isolation, and yet resisting the fear of losing your loved ones during the COVID-19 crisis. Annelies Tanghe and Sam Pieter Janssens recorded their parts separately in their own homestudio. Starman Records released the song on 24 April 2020. Musiczine.net about the song: "The result is a moving and fragile song that touches us in these bizarre times. A warm song with deep lyrics." "Please Don't Disappear" made it into many playlists on Spotify worldwide and on Belgian national Radio 1, Studio Brussel).

=== Other singles (2021–2022) ===
- Chasing The Sun (Starman Records)
- Love Like Gold (Starman Records)

=== The Art Of Love (2023, full album) ===
Together with producer David Poltrock (De Mens, Hooverphonic, Portland, ...) the band released two EPs in 2022 and spring 2023. The Art Of Love, the connecting power of love, is a theme that fits well after the pandemic in which we had to miss each other far too long.

=== "Out of this" ft. Michael C Hall (2023) ===
For this new track, the duo collaborated with producer Mark Plati (known as David Bowie's bandleader and producer) and actor Michael C. Hall, who became famous for his leading roles in Six Foot Under, Dexter and the musical Lazarus, for which Bowie wrote the music.

=== "Sweet Seasons" (2024) ===
The group tours Flanders with Carole King's oeuvre, mixed with their own songs. This combination is well received by the audience. As a tribute to Carole King, they release an intimate version of King's “Sweet Seasons”.

=== "The Unknown" [klankkast] (2025) ===
.After a period of silence, Annelies Tanghe and Sam Pieter Janssens from indie pop band AND THEN CAME FALL are releasing a new single: “The Unknown”. An intimate and powerful song that is both comforting and abrasive. 'The Unknown' is a love letter to the fans, a reminder after a long period of radio silence, a new sound and, above all, a promise for the future. The duo is currently busy recording and finishing beautiful new songs. Music blog Luminous Dash writes: "Just beneath our skin, the warm sound of sensitive strings nestles, illuminated by the glowing, sparkling tones of the piano and Annelies' angelic voice. The song grows in its structure, with increasing power, but never breaks out of its intimate, beautiful bubble." Dansende beren: "We like to compare her to Joan as Police Woman: the similarity is not that their voices are identical, but that they use the same intimacy, warmth, and slightly husky fragility to convey emotions."

== Band members ==
- Annelies Tanghe: vocals, guitars, keys, piano, percussion, songwriting
- Sam Pieter Janssens: guitars, drums, bass, percussion, backing vocals, production

Additional live band members:

- Eva Hautekiet: keys, piano, backing vocals
- Mathias Moors: bass
- Steven Van Gelder: drums

== Discography ==
=== Albums ===
And Then Came Fall:

- Released 1 February 2018
- Label: Starman Records
- Formats: CD, LP

The Art Of Love:

- Released 10 March 2023
- Label: Starman Records
- Formats: CD, LP

=== Singles ===
- "Disqualified" (Starman Records, 2017)
- "Gambler" (Starman Records, 2018)
- "Mirror" (Starman Records, 2018)
- "Biggest Enemy" (Starman Records, 2018)
- "Carved" (Starman Records, 2019)
- "Should We" (Starman Records, 2020)
- "Please Don't Disappear" (Starman Records, 2020)
- "Chasing The Sun" (Starman Records, 2021)
- "Love Like Gold" (Starman Records, 2022)
- "Out of This" (Starman Records, 2023)
- "Sweet Seasons" (Starman Records, 2023)
- "The Unknown" ([klankkast])
