= The Way to Your Heart =

1988 single by Soulsister

Single by Soulsister

from the album It Takes Two
- Released: October 1988 (Europe); February 1989 (UK); September 1989 (US)
- Genre: Pop, Soul
- Length: 3:47
- Label: EMI Music (Benelux); EMI Electrola (Germany); EMI Odeon (Spain)
- Songwriters: Jan Leyers, Paul Michiels
- Producers: Jan Leyers, Paul Michiels; Werner Pensaert (co-producer)

Soulsister singles chronology
"Like A Mountain" (1988)	"The Way to Your Heart" (1988)	"Blame You" (1989)

Music video
- Soulsister - The Way To Your Heart (Official Video) on YouTube

"The Way to Your Heart" is a 1988 hit single by Belgian band Soulsister from the album It Takes Two.

== Background ==
A mixture of pop and rock, the song is about a boy dreaming of a girl that he‘s in love with, but she doesn't answer his love.

== Chart performance ==
After having moderate success in The Netherlands with "Like A Mountain", the first single from their debut album, Soulsister had big success with the follow-up single “The Way to Your Heart”. It was a top 10 hit in five European Countries. The Belgian release had no B-side and was thereby sold as a half price single. Afterwards a maxi single was released with a long version (5:18) and an instrumental version. After its European success, the single was released in the US in 1989 where it charted one week, on #41 on the US Billboard Hot 100 It is their only single to appear on the Hot 100. In addition, "The Way to Your Heart" also peaked at #5 on Billboard Adult Contemporary chart.

== Charts ==
=== Weekly charts ===
Chart (1988)	Peak Position
Austria (Ö3 Austria Top 40)	6
Belgium (Ultratop 50 Flanders)	3
Denmark (Hitlisten)	4
France (IFOP)	47
Ireland (IRMA)	16
Italy Airplay (Music & Media)	12
Netherlands (Single Top 100)	8
Netherlands (Dutch Top 40)	7
Switzerland (Schweizer Hitparade)	8
UK Singles (Official Charts)	81
US Billboard Hot 100	41
US Adult Contemporary (Billboard)	5
West Germany (GfK)	4
