= Idool 2004 =

- Season 2004
- Hosted by: Koen Wauters; Kris Wauters
- Judges: Jean Beaute; Nina De Man; Jan Leyers; Bart Brusseleers
- Winner: Joeri Fransen
- Runner-up: Wouter De Clerck

Release
- Original network: VTM
- Original release: 2004

Season chronology
- ← Previous; Idool 2003 Next → Idool 2007

Idool 2004 was the second season of the Flemish version of the Idol series. It was won by Joeri Fransen, who could not follow the footsteps of former winner Peter Evrard and only release one album before he was dropped by his record company. However, second runner-up Sandrine Van Handenhoven, who was a longtime favorite throughout the season above the winner and the runner-up, enjoyed an ongoing success as a singer as well as the host of the Flemish Big Brother programme and therefore is now considered as the unofficial winner of Idool 2005 as she almost represented Belgium in the Eurovision Song Contest in 2008, coming in close 2nd in the national final. Laura Ramaekers has already been a semifinalist on Idool 2003.

== Finals ==
=== Finalists ===
(ages stated at time of contest)

Contestant	Age	Hometown	Voted Off	Liveshow Theme
Joeri Fransen	23	Herentals	Winner	Grand Finale
Wouter De Clerck	21	Merksem	12 December 2004	Grand Finale
Sandrine Van Handenhoven	20	Sint-Niklaas	5 December 2004	Unplugged
Laura Ramaekers	19	Tongeren	28 November 2004	Rock Hits
Born Meirlaen	24	Latem	21 November 2004	Big Band
Maarten Cox	19	Neerpelt	14 November 2004	One Hit Wonders
Janina Van Caneghem	21	Leopoldsburg	7 November 2004	Film Songs
Laura D'Heedene	19	Honsem	31 October 2004	Dutch Songs
Sarah Cain	23	Hamont-Achel	24 October 2004	Disco Hits
Annelies Cappaert	25	Zedelgem	17 October 2004	My Idol

=== Finals Elimination Chart ===
Legend
Did Not Perform	Female	Male	Top 30	Top 10	Winner

Safe	Safe First	Safe Last	Eliminated

Stage:		Semi			Wild; Card	Finals								
Week:		09/19	09/26	10/03	10/10	10/17	10/24	10/31	11/07	11/14	11/21	11/28	12/05	12/12
Place	Contestant	Result												
1	Joeri Fransen	3rd				Btm 3	Btm 3		Btm 3					Winner
2	Wouter De Clerck		3rd					Btm 3		Btm 2		Btm 2		Runner-Up
3	Sandrine Van Handenhoven			3rd									Elim	
4	Laura Ramaekers			2nd			Btm 2				Btm 2	Elim		
5	Born Meirlaen	1st							Btm 2		Elim			
6	Maarten Cox			1st						Elim				
7	Janina Van Caneghem		Elim		Saved			Btm 2	Elim					
8	Laura D'Heedene		2nd					Elim						
9	Sarah Cain	2nd				Btm 2	Elim							
10	Annelies Cappaert		1st			Elim								
Wild; Card	Sarah Cappaert			Elim	Elim									
Wild; Card	Maï Nuyts		Elim		Elim									
Wild; Card	Siham Ben Taleb	Elim			Elim									
Semi- Final 3	Benny Willaert			Elim										
Semi- Final 3	Björn Rotthier			Elim										
Semi- Final 3	Eline Faes			Elim										
Semi- Final 3	Pieter Leunens			Elim										
Semi- Final 3	Valerie Mouton			Elim										
Semi- Final 3	Wine Lauwers			Elim										
Semi- Final 2	Claude Quickels		Elim											
Semi- Final 2	Davy Macquoi		Elim											
Semi- Final 2	Isabelle Dumortier		Elim											
Semi- Final 2	Melina Vissers		Elim											
Semi- Final 2	Tim Driesen		Elim											
Semi- Final 1	Antoon Torfs	Elim												
Semi- Final 1	Ingrid De Smedt	Elim												
Semi- Final 1	Jessie Gobeyn	Elim												
Semi- Final 1	Leslie Elst	Elim												
Semi- Final 1	Robby Van Lent	Elim												
Semi- Final 1	Sabine Van Campenhout	Elim												

=== Live show details ===
==== Heat 1 (19 September 2004) ====
Artist	Song (original artists)	Result
Antoon Torfs	"Just the Two of Us" (Bill Withers)	Eliminated
Born Meirlaen	"This Love" (Maroon 5)	Advanced
Ingrid De Smedt	"I've Got the Music in Me" (Kiki Dee)	Eliminated
Jessie Gobeyn	"Out of Reach" (Gabrielle)	Eliminated
Joeri Fransen	"Lean on Me" (Bill Withers)	Advanced
Leslie Elst	"Rain Down on Me" (Kane)	Eliminated
Robby Van Lent	"You're the First, the Last, My Everything" (Barry White)	Eliminated
Sabine Van Campenhout	"The Rose" (Bette Midler)	Eliminated
Sarah Cain	"My Immortal" (Evanescence)	Advanced
Siham Ben Taleb	"I'll Be There" (The Jackson 5)	Eliminated

Notes

- Born Meirlaen, Sarah Cain and Joeri Fransen advanced to the top 10 of the competition. The other 7 contestants were eliminated.
- Siham Ben Taleb returned for a second chance at the top 10 in the Wildcard Round.

==== Heat 2 (26 September 2004) ====
Artist	Song (original artists)	Result
Annelies Cappaert	"Somebody to Love" (Queen)	Advanced
Claude Quikels	"Can You Feel the Love Tonight" (Elton John)	Eliminated
Davy Macquoi	"Another Day" (Buckshot LeFonque)	Eliminated
Isabelle Dumortier	"Un-Break My Heart" (Toni Braxton)	Eliminated
Janina Van Caneghem	"Inseparable" (Natalie Cole)	Eliminated
Laura D'Heedene	"(You Make Me Feel Like) A Natural Woman" (Aretha Franklin)	Advanced
Mai Nuyts	"How Come U Don't Call Me Anymore?" (Alicia Keys)	Eliminated
Melina Vissers	"(Sittin' On) The Dock of the Bay" (Otis Redding)	Eliminated
Tim Driesen	"Breathe Easy" (Blue)	Eliminated
Wouter De Clerck	"Jessie" (Joshua Kadison)	Advanced

Notes

- Annelies Cappaert, Laura D'Heedene and Wouter De Clerck advanced to the top 10 of the competition. The other 7 contestants were eliminated.
- Janina Van Caneghem and Mai Nuyts returned for a second chance at the top 10 in the Wildcard Round.

==== Heat 3 (3 October 2004) ====
Artist	Song (original artists)	Result
Benny Willaert	"When the Lights Go Down" (Novastar)	Eliminated
Björn Rotthier	"Somewhere Only We Know" (Keane)	Eliminated
Eline Faes	"The One" (Shakira)	Eliminated
Laura Ramaekers	"If I Ain't Got You" (Alicia Keys)	Advanced
Maarten Cox	"She's Always a Woman" (Billy Joel)	Advanced
Pieter Erasmus Leumens	"Don't You Know" (The Scabs)	Eliminated
Sandrine Van Handenhoven	"Impossible" (Christina Aguilera)	Advanced
Sarah Cappaert	"Perfect Day" (Lou Reed)	Eliminated
Valerie Mouton	"I Will Survive" (Gloria Gaynor)	Eliminated
Wine Lauwers	"Walk Away" (Christina Aguilera)	Eliminated

Notes

- Maarten Cox, Laura Ramaekers and Sandrine Van Handenhoven advanced to the top 10 of the competition. The other 7 contestants were eliminated.
- Sarah Cappaert returned for a second chance at the top 10 in the Wildcard Round.

==== Wildcard round (10 October 2004) ====
Artist	Song (original artists)	Result
Janina Van Caneghem	"Beautiful" (Christina Aguilera)	Advanced
Maï Nuyts	"I'm Outta Love" (Anastacia)	Eliminated
Sarah Cappaert	"I'm Like a Bird" (Nelly Furtado)	Eliminated
Siham Ben Taleb	"Heaven" (Bryan Adams)	Eliminated

Notes

- Janina Van Caneghem received most votes, and completed the top 10.

==== Live Show 1 (17 October 2004) ====
Theme: My Idol

Artist	Song (original artists)	Result
Annelies Cappaert	"Left Outside Alone" (Anastacia)	Eliminated
Born Meirlaen	"Man in the Mirror" (Michael Jackson)	Safe
Janina Van Caneghem	"One Moment in Time" (Whitney Houston)	Safe
Joeri Fransen	"If I Had a Rocket Launcher" (Bruce Cockburn)	Bottom three
Laura D'Heedene	"Nobody's Wife" (Anouk)	Safe
Laura Ramaekers	"You Had Me" (Joss Stone)	Safe
Maarten Cox	"I'll Be There for You" (The Rembrandts)	Safe
Sandrine Van Handenhoven	"I'm Every Woman" (Chaka Khan)	Safe
Sarah Cain	"Piece of My Heart" (Janis Joplin)	Bottom two
Wouter De Clerck	"Walking in Memphis" (Marc Cohn)	Safe

==== Live Show 2 (24 October 2004) ====
Theme: Disco Hits

Artist	Song (original artists)	Result
Born Meirlaen	"Señorita" (Justin Timberlake)	Safe
Janina Van Caneghem	"Disco Inferno" (The Trammps)	Safe
Joeri Fransen	"All Night Long (All Night)" (Lionel Richie)	Bottom three
Laura D'Heedene	"We Are Family" (Sister Sledge)	Safe
Laura Ramaekers	"Hot Stuff" (Donna Summer)	Bottom two
Maarten Cox	"Sex Bomb" (Tom Jones)	Safe
Sandrine Van Handenhoven	"Lola's Theme" (The Shapeshifters)	Safe
Sarah Cain	"Never Can Say Goodbye" (Gloria Gaynor)	Eliminated
Wouter De Clerck	"Fresh" (Kool & the Gang)	Safe

==== Live Show 3 (31 October 2004) ====
Theme: Dutch Songs

Artist	Song (original artists)	Result
Born Meirlaen	"Leef" (Mozaïek)	Safe
Janina Van Caneghem	"Dag vreemde man" (Ann Christy)	Bottom two
Joeri Fransen	"Geen toeval" (Marco Borsato)	Safe
Laura D'Heedene	"Meisjes aan de macht" (Yasmine)	Eliminated
Laura Ramaekers	"Ik zie" (Xander de Buisonjé)	Safe
Maarten Cox	"Laat ons een bloem" (Louis Neefs)	Safe
Sandrine Van Handenhoven	"Heb ik ooit gezegd" (Clouseau)	Safe
Wouter De Clerck	"Je hoeft niet naar huis vannacht" (Marco Borsato)	Bottom three

==== Live Show 4 (7 November 2004) ====
Theme: Film Songs

Artist	Song (original artists)	Result
Born Meirlaen	"I Still Haven't Found What I'm Looking For" (U2)	Bottom two
Janina Van Caneghem	"Flashdance... What a Feeling" (Irene Cara)	Eliminated
Joeri Fransen	"Everybody's Talkin'" (Harry Nilsson)	Bottom three
Laura Ramaekers	"I Believe I Can Fly" (R. Kelly)	Safe
Maarten Cox	"You've Lost That Lovin' Feelin'" (The Righteous Brothers)	Safe
Sandrine Van Handenhoven	"Work It Out" (Beyoncé)	Safe
Wouter De Clerck	"Footloose" (Kenny Loggins)	Safe

==== Live Show 5 (14 November 2004) ====
Theme: One Hit Wonders

Artist	Song (original artists)	Result
Born Meirlaen	"Breakfast at Tiffany's" (Deep Blue Something)	Safe
Joeri Fransen	"Lovin' Whiskey" (Rory Block)	Safe
Laura Ramaekers	"Crush" (Jennifer Paige)	Safe
Maarten Cox	"Wonderful Life" (Black)	Eliminated
Sandrine Van Handenhoven	"I Love Your Smile" (Shanice)	Safe
Wouter De Clerck	"You" (Ten Sharp)	Bottom two
Born Meirlaen & Sandrine Van Handenhoven	"It Takes Two" (Marvin Gaye & Kim Weston)	N/A
Joeri Fransen & Wouter De Clerck	"Dancing in the Street" (Mick Jagger & David Bowie)	N/A
Laura Ramaekers & Maarten Cox	"Up Where We Belong" (Joe Cocker & Jennifer Warnes)	N/A

==== Live Show 6 (21 November 2004) ====
Theme: Big Band

Artist	Song (original artists)	Result
Born Meirlaen	"Beyond the Sea" (Bobby Darin)	Eliminated
Joeri Fransen	"Feeling Good" (Nina Simone)	Safe
Laura Ramaekers	"Big Spender" (Shirley Bassey)	Bottom two
Sandrine Van Handenhoven	"Me and Mr. Jones" (Billy Paul)	Safe
Wouter De Clerck	"Fever" (Peggy Lee)	Safe

==== Live Show 7 (28 November 2004) ====
Theme: Rock Hits

Artist	First song (original artists)	Second song	Result
Joeri Fransen	"Black" (Pearl Jam)	"Clocks" (Coldplay)	Safe
Laura Ramaekers	"Bitch" (Meredith Brooks)	"The First Cut Is the Deepest" (Cat Stevens)	Eliminated
Sandrine Van Handenhoven	"Get the Party Started" (Pink)	"Pieces of Me" (Ashlee Simpson)	Safe
Wouter De Clerck	"Are You Gonna Go My Way" (Lenny Kravitz)	"Born in the U.S.A." (Bruce Springsteen)	Bottom two

==== Live Show 8: Semi-final (5 December 2004) ====
Theme: Unplugged

Artist	First song (original artists)	Second song	Result
Joeri Fransen	"Out of Time" (Chris Farlowe)	"Wicked Game" (Chris Isaak)	Safe
Sandrine Van Handenhoven	"Emotions" (Mariah Carey)	"Mad About You" (Hooverphonic)	Eliminated
Wouter De Clerck	"I Heard It Through the Grapevine" (Marvin Gaye)	"Layla" (Derek and the Dominos)	Safe

==== Live final (12 December 2004) ====
Artist	First song	Second song	Third song	Result
Joeri Fransen	"Everybody's Talkin'"	"Georgia on My Mind"	"Ya Bout To Find Out"	Winner
Wouter De Clerck	"Walking in Memphis"	"I Guess That's Why They Call It the Blues"	"Ya Bout To Find Out"	Runner-up
