= Rise Robots Rise =

American hip hop group

Rise Robots Rise is an American experimental hip-hop band, signed to TVT in the early 1990s, and later to Fibre Productions. The songs of Spawn are credited to J. Mendelson and B. Nitze. Tracey Amos, Michelle Johnson and Paulisa Moorman are featured on guest vocals.

Singer Tom Jones covered the song "If I Only Knew" on a single released in 1994. It is also featured on Jones' albums The Lead and How to Swing It, and Tom Jones Reloaded: Greatest Hits, a collection of covers.

The band's self-titled debut studio album was released in 1992.

== Discography ==
=== Albums ===
Rise Robots Rise (1992)

TVT 3210-2

1. "All Sewn Up"
2. "Buffalo Wack Child"
3. "Flowers And Birds"
4. "Get Ready"
5. "If I Only Knew"
6. "The Pipe Talks To You"
7. "The Way We Move"
8. "Mars"
9. "Talk Is Cheap"
10. "Zombie Demons"

Spawn (1993)

TVT 3220-2

1. "Buttermilk"
2. "Real Gone"
3. "Big"
4. "Fear"
5. "The Bottle"
6. "Desdemona"
7. "Solar Blues"
8. "Particle You"
9. "Not Enough"
10. "Rosalee"

Circular File (1994)

TRI001

1. "Waves"
2. "The Enther"
3. "Three Of A Perfect Pair"
4. "Starlight"
5. "Soul Survivor"
6. "Insane"

=== EPs ===
Talk Is Cheap/Flowers & Birds (1991)

TVT 3211-2

1. "Talk Is Cheap (LP Version)"
2. "Back Talk"
3. "Flowers & Birds (LP Version)"
4. "Flowers & Birds II: The Return"

All Sewn Up (1992)

TVT 3212-2P

1. "Bryan Chuck New's 7″ Remix (Radio Edit)"
2. "LP Version (Radio Edit)"
3. "Bryan Chuck New's 12″ (Extend Remix)"
4. "LP Version (Censored)"
5. "Bryan Chuck New's Instrumental"

If I Only Knew/All Sewn Up (1992)

TVT 3213-2

1. "If I Only Knew - Safe Remix (radio edit)"
2. "If I Only Knew - The Love Remix"
3. "If I Only Knew - The Loveglove Remix"
4. "If I Only Knew - LP Censored Version"
5. "If I Only Knew - Paizly Remix"
6. "If I Only Knew - Double Safe 12″ Remix"
7. "If I Only Knew - Double Safe Instrumental"
8. "All Sewn Up - LP Version (radio edit)"
9. "All Sewn Up - Up Up And Away 12″ Extended Remix"

The Bottle/Strange Brew (1993)

TVT 3221-2

1. "The Bottle (radio edit)"
2. "Strange Brew"
3. "Strange Brew (double shot mix)"
4. "The Bottle (album version)"
