= Wim Soutaer =

Belgian singer (born 1974)

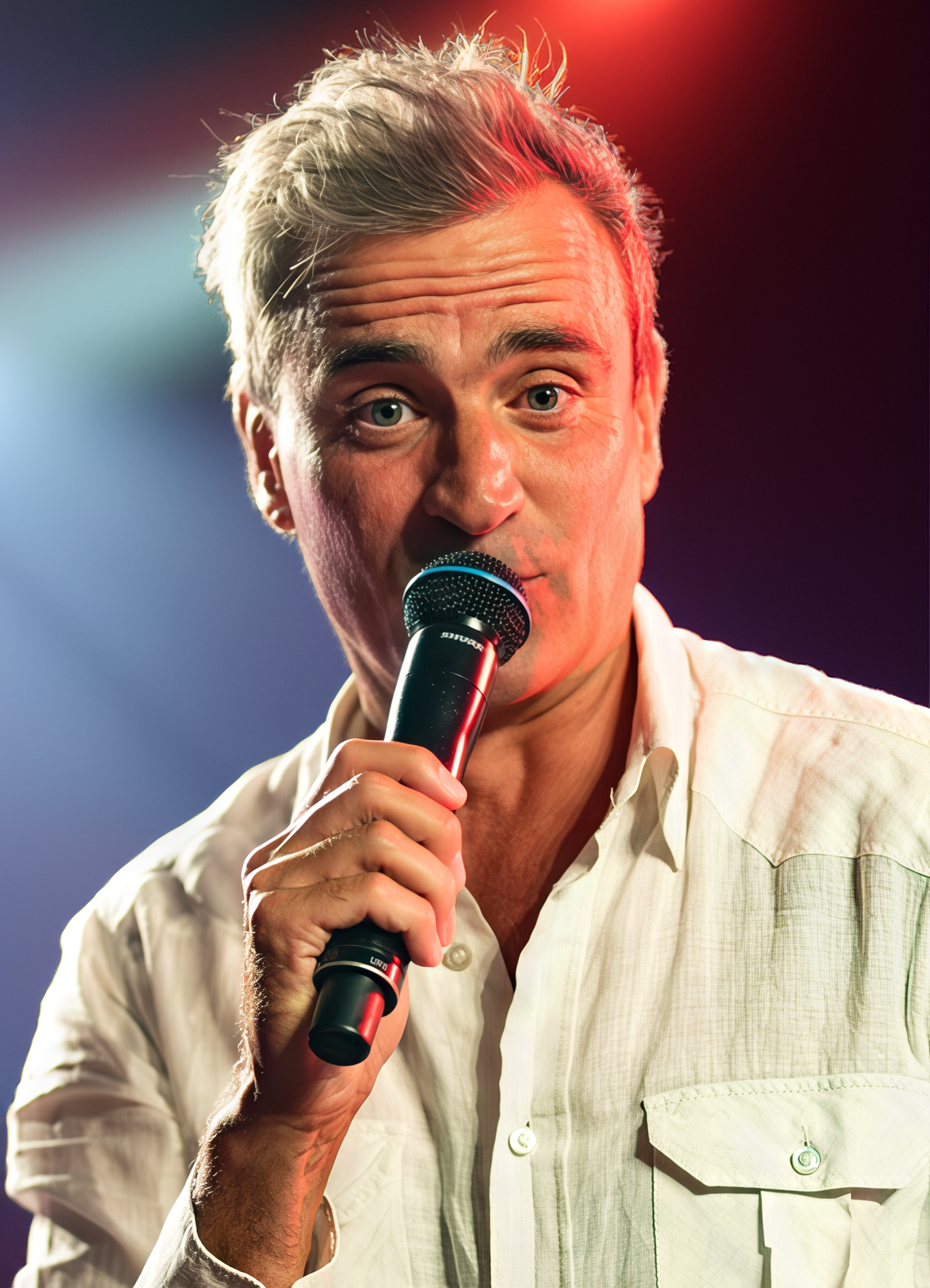
- Soutaer in 2025

Background information
- Genres: Pop; rock
- Occupations: Singer; Songwriter
- Years active: 1990s–present
- Labels: BMG Belgium; Niels William
- Website: www.wimsoutaer.be

Wim Soutaer (born 1974) is a Belgian pop music singer. He place third in Idool 2003, the Belgian version of Pop Idol, and went on to achieve commercial success with his hit single "Allemaal" and his debut album Een Nieuw Begin, released by BMG Music.

== Career ==
Soutaer began singing in the early 1990s with his school band State Of Mind who performed benefit concerts of original songs and also covers of Pearl Jam, Nirvana and Metallica.

In 2000, Soutaer wanted to sing solo and joined the project Soundmixshow a sort of precursor talent show to Idool, Soutaer placed fourth in competition overall, at this time he compared his style to Billy Joel, Mike Patton and Elton John.

In 2003, Soutaer entered the auditions for the contest Idool 2003 where he was told by jury member Jan Leyers that he has a good voice for Flemish music. After Soutaer placed third on the show he gained a recording contract with BMG Belgium and recorded his first CD Een Nieuw Begin (A New Start) which was produced by Ronald Vanhuffel who has had previous success with Blof and Volumia, the first single was Allemaal (Everyone) which was a huge hit reaching #1, selling 40,000 copies and winning the Zomerhit 2003 Best Song Of The Year.

The second single from Een Nieuw Begin was Ik Hoor Bij Jou (I Belong With You). The third was Voor Altijd (For Always), based on the 1997 Nek hit Laura non c'e, and was another #1 hit on the Ultratop 50.

In August 2004, Soutaer released his second CD Twee (Two) and his first live DVD "In Miami". This was followed by his first tour "Twee" around Flanders, as well as a live performance on the popular live music show Tien Om Te Zien.

October 2005 brought a management change for Soutaer who signed with Niels William, assembling a team of writers including Hans Francken of Clouseau. He released a single Die Zomer Gaat Nooit Voorbij which was released on 17 June as a sample for his third CD released in October 2006. This was a cover of South African artist Kurt Darren's Hemel op Tafelberg in Afrikaans.

== Discography ==
Date	Title	Chart	Accreditation
Album: Een Nieuw Begin (Oktober) 2003 (Platina): 01. Voor Altijd; 02. Allemaal; 03. Onderweg; 04. Ik Hoor Bij Jou; 05. Volle Maan; 06. Centrum Van Mijn Hart; 07. Nodig; 08. Vogelvrij; 09. Verlangen Duet Natalia; 10. Wat Zou Je Doen; 11. Magie; 12. Een Nieuw Begin; 13. Afscheid
Album: Twee (Augustus) 2004 (Goud): 01. Goud; 02. Kom Bij Mij; 03. Ik Heb Je Lief; 04. Geluk; 05. Kijk Eens Om Je Heen; 06. Laat Me Gaan; 07. Samen Verder Gaan; 08. Wat ik zeggen wil; 09. Wat Waar Is En Wat Niet; 10. Alles Wat Ik Wil; 11. Verloren Liefde; 12. Voor 1 Dag Vrij; 13. Zonder Woorden
Album: Dichterbij 2008 Vanaf Augustus 2008 te koop
Singles:
01 Allemaal (Juli) 2003
02 Ik Hoor Bij Jou (Oktober) 2003
03 Voor Altijd (Februari) 2004
04 Wat Zou Je Doen (Mei) 2004
05 Kom Bij Mij (Juli) 2004
06 Zonder Woorden (September) 2004
07 Ik Heb Je Lief (November) 2004
08 Kijk Eens Om Je Heen (Remix)(Februari) 2005
09 Overal (Juni) 2005
10 Die Zomer Gaat Nooit Voorbij (Juni) 2006
11 De Wereld Draait Door (Februari) 2007
12 Ze Kent Me (Juni) 2007
13 1000 Manieren (Januari) 2008
14 Slaap Je Hier Vannacht (Juni) 2008
DVDs:
2004	In Miami		

== Idool 2003 performances ==
Brussels Auditions: Honesty by Billy Joel
Theatre Round Day One: Better Man by Robbie Williams
Theatre Round Day Two: Uptown Girl by Billy Joel
Theatre Round Day Three: Faith by George Michael
Top 50: Honesty by Billy Joel
Top 10: Drops Of Jupiter (Tell Me) by Train
Top 9: With Or Without You by U2
Top 8: Afscheid by Marco Borsato
Top 7: Iris by Goo Goo Dolls
Top 6: I Heard It Through The Grapevine by Marvin Gaye
Top 5: Mack The Knife by Louis Armstrong
Top 4: Hero by Enrique Iglesias
Top 4: The Rhythm Divine by Enrique Iglesias
Top 3: Love Is All Around by Wet Wet Wet
Top 3: Blauw by The Scene

== See also ==
- Belgian music
