= Octopus (Belgian band) =

Belgian close-harmony band

- The band in 1981: Paul Michiels, Phil Francis, Gerard Opdebeeck, Robert Vlaeyen

Background information
- Origin: Diest, Belgium
- Genres: Rock, pop rock
- Years active: 1973-1980, 1981
- Labels: Tack, Gnome, Pink Elephant, Vogue
- Past members: Paul Michiels; Phil Francis; Gerard Opdebeeck; Robert Vlaeyen; Steve Davies; Jean-Pierre Onraedt; Nic Roland

Octopus were an Irish-Flemish band active 1973 to 1980. Formed in Heist op den Berg in late 1972, the original members were Robert Vlaeyen, Steve Davies, Jean-Pierre Onraedt and Nic Roland. Robert Vlaeyen came from the group The Bats where Robert's brother, the television producer René Vlaeyen also played, but became Octopus's manager. After a time, Nic Roland left due to session work schedules, and was replaced by a friend of Steve's from Ireland, Phil Francis, a bass player and singer. Jean-Pierre was an in-demand session drummer and had to leave the band shortly afterwards and was replaced by another former 'Bats' member, Gerard Opdebeeck. The band worked as a 4-piece, but really wanted a fifth voice and a keyboardist. They auditioned quite a few and chose Paul Michiels, who later became popular for his work with the Belgian music group Soulsister.

After two large hits, "I'm So in Love with You" (an English language remake of Paul Severs "Ik ben Verliefd op jou") and "My Special Angel", the band worked regularly in Europe, and toured with other bands such as Mud and the Rubettes.

Steve left the band in 1976, and returned to the UK, where he became a successful cabaret singer known as Steve Grey, and then on to the US, where he played in a number of bands and did extensive session work. He is now a solo act, but travels a lot, notably gigs in the Bahamas, Germany, and Vietnam, where he presently lives. Phil Francis left Belgium in the early 1980s, and now has a travel business in Toronto, Canada. When not working on his business, he is an active member of the Toronto-based New Choir. The members have all remained good friends over the years.

== Discography ==
- "I'm So in Love with You" (1974) (NL#16)
- "My Special Angel" (1975) (NL#18)
- "Summerland" (1976) (NL#21)
- "South of the Border" (1978) (NL#14)
