= Mint (band) =

Belgian pop-rock band

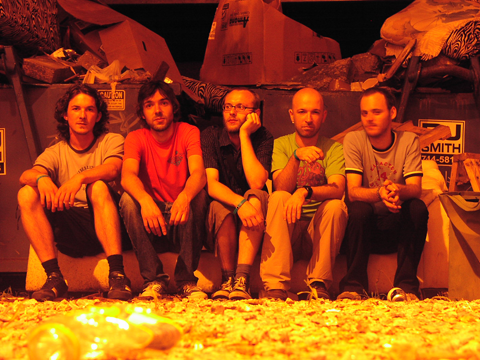
- Mint in 2005

Background information
- Origin: Belgium
- Genres: Pop rock
- Years active: 1999–present
- Labels: Green LFant Records, Funzalo Records, Munich Records
- Members: Erwin Marcisz; Steve Janssens; Phil Marcisz; Kim Windmolders; Tim Claes

Mint is a Belgian pop-rock band, which since 1999 released five full-length albums.

== History ==
After releasing a few singles, they worked with Australian producer Peter Crosbie and released Echoes from the Engine Room (2004) on indie-label Green LFant Records from Brussels. Mint played some of the biggest festivals in Belgium: Dour Festival, Marktrock en Pukkelpop. The album was released in The Netherlands, France, and Switzerland in 2005. Their second album, Magnetism, was recorded Richmond, Virginia, with producer John Morand; it was released in Belgium and the Netherlands in 2006, with a CD presentation took place in the King Baudouin Stadium in Brussels. Their single "The Magnetism of Pure Gold" reached the number 0 spot at KinkFM, a Dutch alternative radio station.

Mint signed with American label Funzalo records, which released Magnetism in the US. The single "Your Shopping Lists are Poetry" reached the first place in the Top 10 of most requested songs on WEQX-radio, an American alternative radio-station.

In 2006 they caused a stir in the Belgian media because Queen Fabiola started dancing during their gig at the Royal Palace of Laeken, the traditional residence of the Belgian monarchy. Their third album, Hinterland, was released in 2008 on Munich Records.

== Members ==
- Erwin Marcisz (vocals, guitar)
- Steve Janssens (guitar)
- Phil Marcisz (bass)
- Kim Windmolders (keys)
- Tim Claes (drums)

== Discography ==
=== Albums ===
- Echoes from the Engine Room (2004)
- Magnetism (2006)
- Hinterland (2008); Professional rating: World of Music
- Hits From Her Laser (2010)
- Glass Lagoon (2014)

=== Singles ===
- "Slim Fit Plan (2001)
- "Halflit Cigarette (2001)
- "Dragon's Lair (2003)
- "Glow (effervescent)
- "Your Shopping Lists are Poetry"
- "The Magnetism of Pure Gold"
