= Stijn =

Stijn is a Dutch short form of names ending in "stijn" such as Constantijn or Augustijn. It was the tenth most popular name for boys born in the Netherlands in 2007. People with this name include:

- Stijn Celis (born 1964), Belgian choreographer and set designer
- Stijn Claessens (born 1959), Dutch economist
- Stijn Coninx (born 1957), Belgian film director
- Stijn D'Hulst (born 1991), Belgian volleyball player
- Stijn De Smet (born 1985), Belgian football midfielder
- Stijn Dejonckheere (born 1988), Belgian volleyball player
- Stijn Derkx (born 1995), Dutch football striker
- Stijn Devolder (born 1979), Belgian racing cyclist
- Stijn Francis (born 1982), Belgian football midfielder
- Stijn van Gassel (born 1996), Dutch football goalkeeper
- Stijn Haeldermans (born 1975), Belgian football midfielder
- Stijn Houben (born 1995), Dutch football defender
- Stijn Huysegems (born 1982), Belgian football forward
- Stijn Jaspers (1961–1984), Dutch middle- and long-distance runner
- Stijn Koomen (born 1987), Dutch actor
- Stijn de Looijer (born 1992), Dutch football midfielder
- Stijn van der Meer (born 1993), Dutch baseball player
- Stijn Meert (born 1978), Belgian football midfielder
- Stijn Minne (born 1978), Belgian football defender
- Stijn Neirynck (born 1985), Belgian racing cyclist
- Stijn Schaars (born 1984), Dutch football midfielder
- Stijn Spierings (born 1996), Dutch football midfielder
- Stijn Steels (born 1989), Belgian racing cyclist
- Stijn Streuvels (1871–1969), Belgian writer
- Stijn Van Cauter (born 19??), Belgian electronic musician

Stijn Vanclooster (born 1974), translator and writer

- Stijn Vandenbergh (born 1984), Belgian racing cyclist
- Stijn Vreven (born 1973), Belgian football defender and manager
- Stijn Wuytens (born 1989), Belgian football midfielder
