= Mintzkov =

Belgian rock band

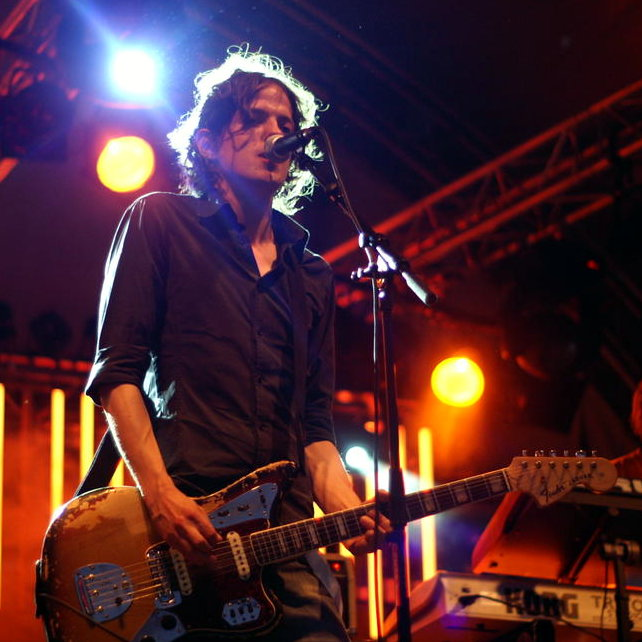
- Mintzkov in concert.

Background information
- Also known as: Mintzkov Luna
- Origin: Lier, Belgium
- Genres: Rock
- Years active: 1999–present
- Website: www.mintzkov.com

Mintzkov is a Belgian rock band from Lier, formally known as Mintzkov Luna. They won first place in Humo's Rock Rally in 2000.

== Discography ==
=== Albums ===
- M for Means and L for Love (2003) (as Mintzkov Luna)
- 360° (2007)
- Rising Sun, Setting Sun (2010)
- Sky Hits Ground (2013)
- Oh Paradise (2020)

=== Singles ===
- "Copper" (2001)
- "Mimosa" (2003)
- "United Something" (2003)
- "I Do" (2003)
- "One Equals a Lot" (2007)
- "Ruby Red" (2007)
- "Return & Smile" (2007)
- "Violetta" (2008)
- "Opening Fire" (2010) (#29 in Ultratop Belgian national charts)
- "Author of the Play" (2010)
- "Finders Keepers" (2010)
- "Automat" (2011)
- "Slow Motion, Full Ahead" (2013)
- "Word of Mouth" (2013)
- "August Eyes" (2020)

=== Compilations ===
- "10 Years Mintzkov Rare Recordings 2001-2011" (2011)
