= Blue Blot =

- Origin: Belgium
- Genres: Blues rock
- Years active: 1986–2000
- Labels: BMG
- Past members: Luke Walter Jr; Steve Clisby; Marty Townsend; Lenny Northover; Michael Schack; Jan Meyers

Blue Blot were a Belgian blues rock band.

== Biography ==
The band were formed by frontman Luke Walter Jr. and influenced by blues-rock and soul music, with an emphasis on hits. They signed to Ace, a small Belgium label and released their debut album, Shopping For Love in 1987. The group were signed to BMG / Ariola and achieved commercial success in Germany and Scandinavia with the albums Bridge To Your Heart and Where Do We Go and a cover of Toto's "Hold the Line". In 1993, Walter Jr discovered he was suffering from leukemia and left the band to be replaced by Steve Clisby. He later had a solo career but died in 1996.

== Members ==
- Luke Walter Jr. – vocals (to 1993)
- Steve Clisby – vocals (after 1993)
- Marty Townsend – guitar
- Lenny Northover – sax
- Michael Schack – drums
- Jan Meijers – bass

Backing vocals:

- Anja Baert alias Chelsy
- Catherine Mys
- Cindy Barg
- Mich Van Hautem
- Sabine de Vos (stand-in)

== Discography ==
Studio albums

- Shopping For Love (1987)
- Bridge to your Heart (1991)
- Where Do We Go (1992)
- Yo Yo Man (1994)
- Blue Blot (1996)

Live albums

- Live (1993)

Compilations

- Blunk (2000)
- Hit Collection (2008)
