= Joeri Fransen =

Belgian singer

- Born: 10 July 1981 (age 44); Belgium
- Occupation: singer
- Known for: Idool 2004

Joeri Fransen (born 10 July 1981) is the winner of Idool 2004, the Belgian version of Pop Idol.

== Idol performances ==
1. Semi-Finals (group 1): "Lean On Me" (Bill Withers)
2. Top 10: "If I Had A Rocket Launcher" (Bruce Cockburn)
3. Top 9: "All Night Long" (Lionel Richie)
4. Top 8: "Geen Toeval" (Marco Borsato)
5. Top 7: "Everybody's Talking" (Harry Nilsson)
6. Top 6: "Lovin Whiskey" (Rory Block)
7. Top 5: "Feeling Good" (Nina Simone)
8. Top 4: "Black" (Pearl Jam)
9. Top 4: "Clocks" (Coldplay)
10. Top 3: "Wicked Game" (Chris Isaak)
11. Top 3: "Out of Time" (Chris Farlowe)
12. Top 2: "Ya Bout To Find Out" (winner's single)
13. Top 2: "Everybody's Talking" (reprise) (Harry Nilsson)
14. Top 2: "Georgia on My Mind" (Ray Charles)

== Discography ==
- "Ya Bout To Find Out" (Debut Single)
1. "Ya Bout To Find Out"
2. "Everybody's Talking"
3. "Georgia on My Mind"
4. "Ya Bout To Find Out" (instrumental)
- "High and Alive"
1. "High and Alive"
2. "If I Had A Rocket Launcher"
- True Lies (Debut Album)
1. "Song For You"
2. "If I Had A Rocket Launcher"
3. "High and Alive"
4. "You Gotta Learn"
5. "Once A Man"
6. "Scratch The Surface"
7. "Here's To You"
8. "True Lies"
9. "Personality"
10. "Brave Heart"
11. "Ya Bout To Find Out"
12. "We Came This Far"
13. "Hold On to a Dream"
- "We Came This Far"
1. "We Came This Far"
2. "Stephanie Says"
- "True Lies" (single)
1. "True Lies"

Preceded by Peter Evrard	Idool; Winner; Season 2 (2004)	Succeeded by Dean Dellanoit
