= Peter Evrard =

Belgian singer

- Born: Peter Evrard; 19 October 1974 (age 51); Turnhout, Belgium
- Origin: Beerse, Belgium
- Occupation: Singer
- Years active: 2003–present
- Website: http://10rogue.com

Peter Evrard (born 19 October 1974) is the winner of the first season of Idool 2003, the Belgian version of Pop Idol.

Evrard defied the traditional rules of the Idols series by singing rock music instead of the expected pop. Regardless, he managed to win the series, and in 2003 he placed third overall in the World Idol contest. Evrard lives and works in Beerse, Belgium. He is married and has 2 sons and a daughter.

In 2005, Peter began recording music again with his band Toner on the CD Radio Honolulu. The song "Let Me Take You Through the Night" was used for the soundtrack of Flikken, a popular Belgian television series.

In 2007, he recorded, together with Sofie Van Moll, the new theme for the Belgian soap opera Thuis.

In 2014, he joined the band 10Rogue, and their first single Know Better was released in September 2015.

In January 2016 they released their second single Dark Angel Princess.

== Discography ==
- 2003: Idool 2003: Greatest Moments
- 2003: Rhubarb
  - "For You"
  - "Loserman"
  - "Making It Beautiful"
- 2005: Radio Honolulu
  - "Let Me Take You Through The Night"
  - "Deaf Dumb Blind"
- 2006: Eurosong '06
  - "Coward"
- 2015: 10Rogue
  - "Know Better"
- 2016: 10Rogue
  - "Dark Angel Princess"

== Idol 2003 performances ==
- Antwerp Auditions: "My Own Ground"
- Theatre Round Day One: "I'm Thinking About Your Soul"
- Theatre Round Day Two: "Uptown Girl" by Billy Joel
- Theatre Round Day Three: "Faith" by George Michael
- Top 50: "How You Remind Me" by Nickelback
- Top 10: Lithium by Nirvana
- Top 9: "If You Don't Know Me By Now" by Simply Red
- Top 8: "Van God Los" by Monza
- Top 7: "Hero" by Chad Kroeger & Josey Scott
- Top 6: "Don't Walk Away"
- Top 5: "Almost Like Being in Love" by Nat King Cole
- Top 4: "Livin' La Vida Loca" by Ricky Martin
- Top 4: "Se Bastasse Una Canzone" by Eros Ramazzotti
- Top 3: "Rockin' In The Free World" by Neil Young
- Top 3: "Never Tear Us Apart" by INXS
- Grand Final: "Lithium" by Nirvana
- Grand Final: "Have A Little Faith in Me" by John Hiatt
- Grand Final: "For You"

Preceded by None	Idool; Winner; Season 1 (2003)	Succeeded by Joeri Fransen
