= De Mens =

Flemish rock band

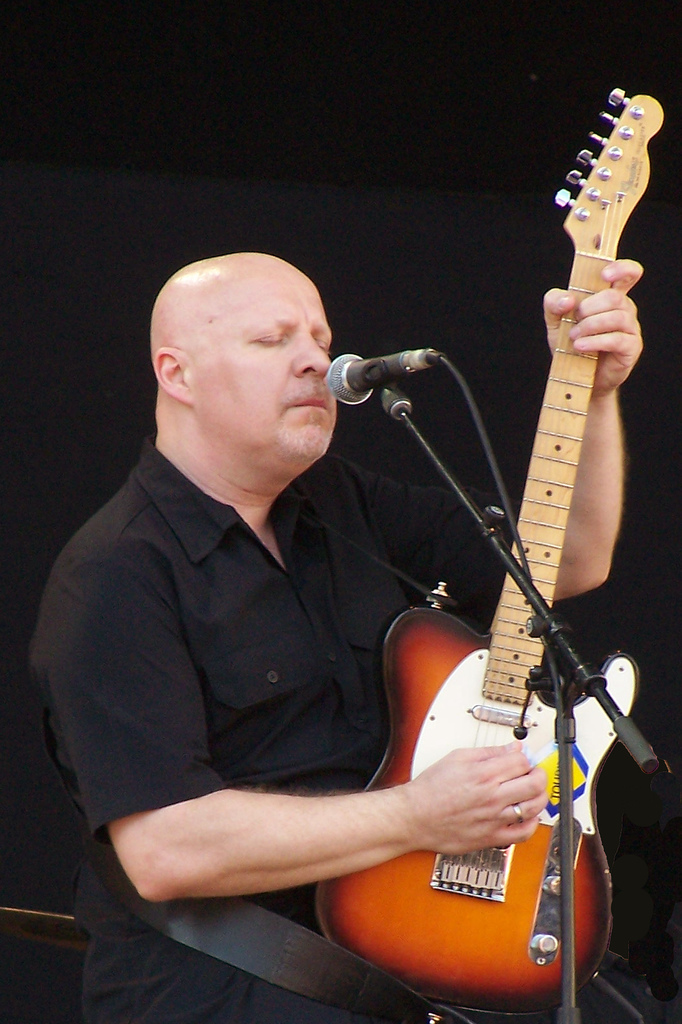
- Frank Vander linden of De Mens

Background information
- Origin: Belgium
- Genres: Rock music
- Years active: 1992–present
- Labels: Play That Beat!, Play It Again Sam, Universal Music
- Members: Frank Vander linden, vocals, guitar Michel de Coster, bass guitar Dirk Jans, drums
- Website: http://demens.be

De Mens is a Flemish rock band from Belgium. The current members of the band are Frank Vander linden, Michel de Coster, and Dirk Jans.

== History ==
After playing in many hobby groups together, long-time friends Vander linden and De Coster decided to start De Mens. Vander linden, a journalist for the Belgian magazine Humo, left his job to pursue a career as a full-time musician. The first demo's were in English, but Vander linden eventually switched to standard Dutch. Using his native language made it easier for him to bring nuances and wordplay into the lyrics.

In 1992 the band released its first radio single, "Dit is mijn huis" ("This Is My House"), followed by the full album De Mens. Later came other successful singles "Jeroen Brouwers (schrijft een boek)" ("Jeroen Brouwers [Writes a Book]") and "Irene".

The band's second album, called Ik wil meer (I Want More), contains the singles "Nederland" ("The Netherlands"), "Zij zit daar en ik zit hier" ("She Is Sitting There and I Am Sitting Here"), and "Lachen en mooi zijn" ("Smiling and Being Pretty"). Meanwhile, Vander linden developed a reputation as a writer. Thanks to his success in the Studio Brussel radio programme Collage, he has frequently been asked to be a columnist and spoken-word performer.

In the winter of 1995, Vander linden went on a small tour titled Solo bij u thuis and a mini-CD, Patti Blues, followed. During that same winter, the band recorded a new album titled Wil je beroemd zijn? (Do You Want to Be Famous?) at the ICP studios in Brussels. It spawned two popular singles, "Maandag" ("Monday") and "Sheryl Crow I Need You So".

De Mens embarked on a partly acoustic theatre tour from October to November 1997. A compilation CD followed, containing the radio singles "Ik wil een vrouw zijn" ("I Want to Be a Woman"), "Val niet in liefde" ("Don't Fall into Love"), and some brand-new songs.

The band signed up with the Play It Again Sam record company, and released the album Sex verandert alles (Sex Changes Everything). It was recorded partly in the ICP studios and partly at home. The singles "Einde van de eeuw" ("The End of the Century") and "Sex verandert alles" ("Sex Changes Everything") scored well in the alternative charts. A club tour followed. Meanwhile, Vander linden became a regular panel member in the television quiz show Nonkel pop on a channel of the Belgian public broadcaster VRT. He also played himself in the film Film 1 by Willem Wallyn.

Since then, they have released the albums Liefde (Love) with hit single "Ergens onderweg" ("Somewhere down the road"), Blond (Blonde) with hit single "Kamer in Amsterdam" ("Room in Amsterdam"), In het Gras (In The Grass) Onder de Duinen (Below the dunes), with hit single Luide Muziek in Kleine Auto's (Loud Music in Small Cars) and Is dit mijn hart? (Is this my Heart?) with hit single Hier komt mijn Schip (Here comes my Ship).

Meanwhile, frontman Frank Vander Linden released his first solo album in 2009.

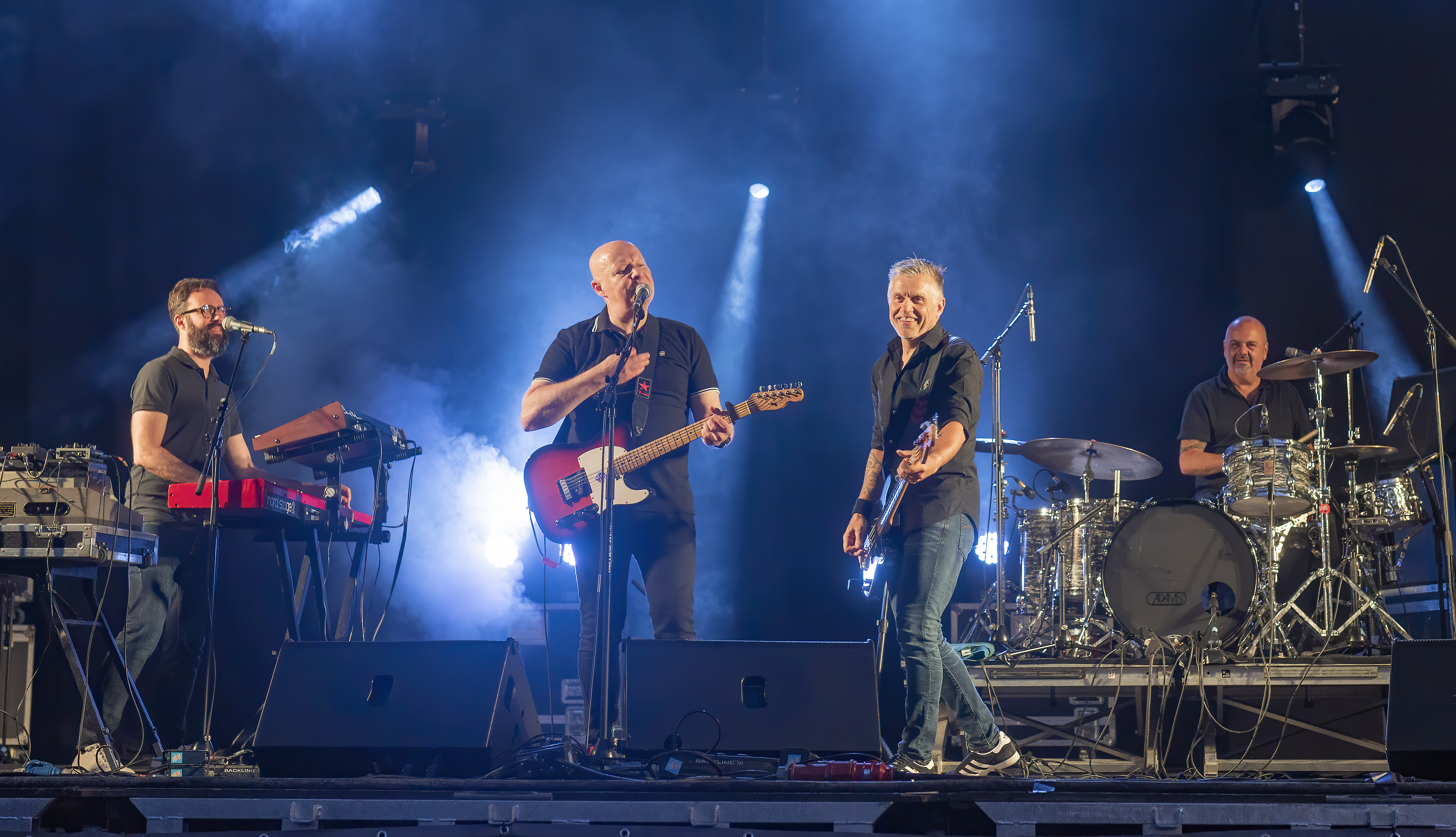
De Mens in concert, 2019

In 2022, a concert tour celebrated the 30 year career of De Mens.

== Discography ==
=== Studio albums ===
- 1992: De Mens
- 1994: Ik wil meer
- 1996: Wil je beroemd zijn?
- 1999: Sex verandert alles
- 2001: Liefde
- 2003: Blond
- 2005: In het gras
- 2007: Onder de duinen
- 2010: Is dit mijn hart?
- 2012: Muziek!
- 2014: Nooit genoeg
- 2017: 24 uur
- 2022: Broers

=== Compilations ===
- 1997: De Mens Deluxe
- 2004: Akoestisch
- 2010: Alle 40 Goed
- 2011: Essential
- 2012: Muziek! / Het Beste Uit 20 Jaar
