= Soulsister =

Belgian band

SoulSister
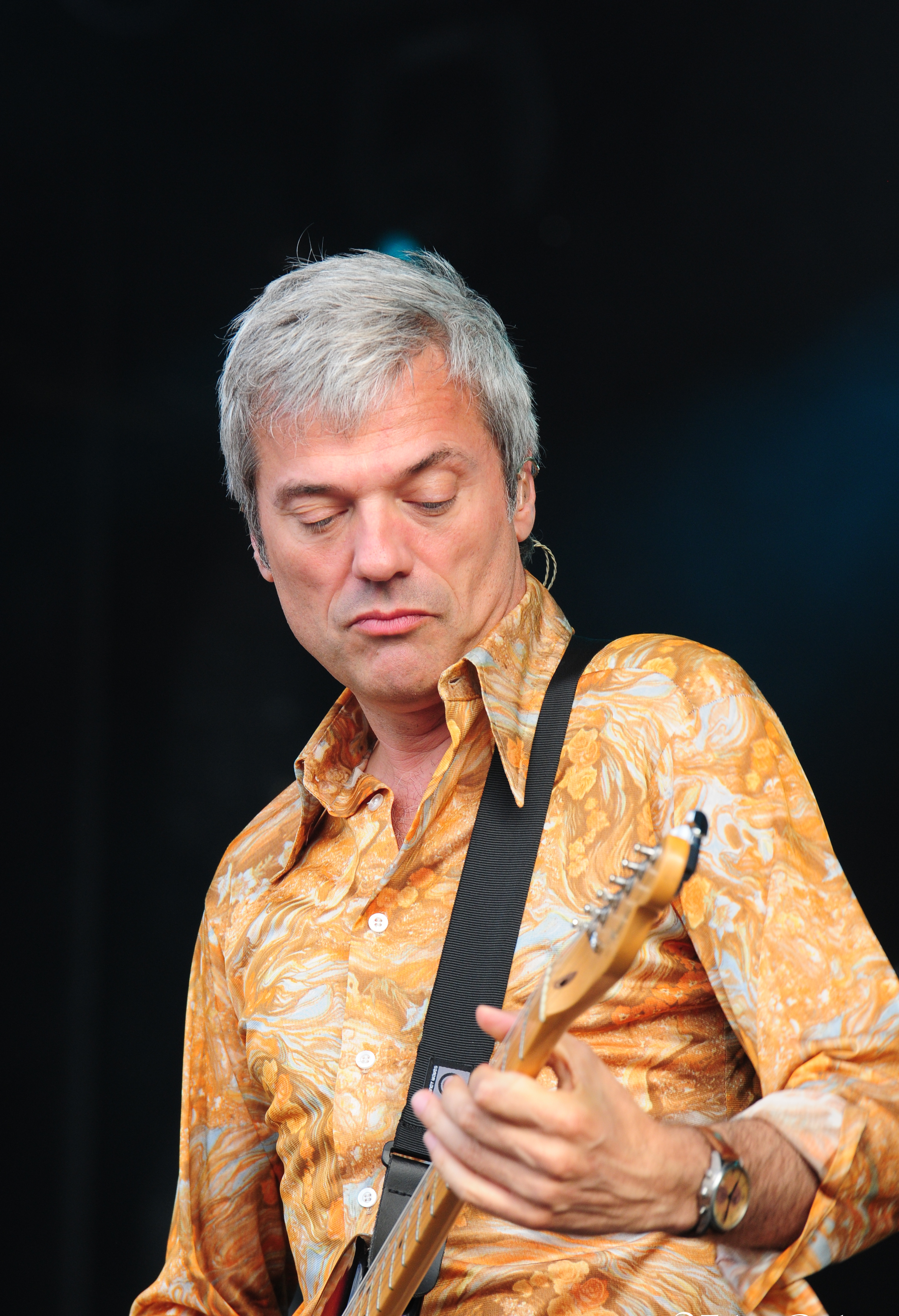
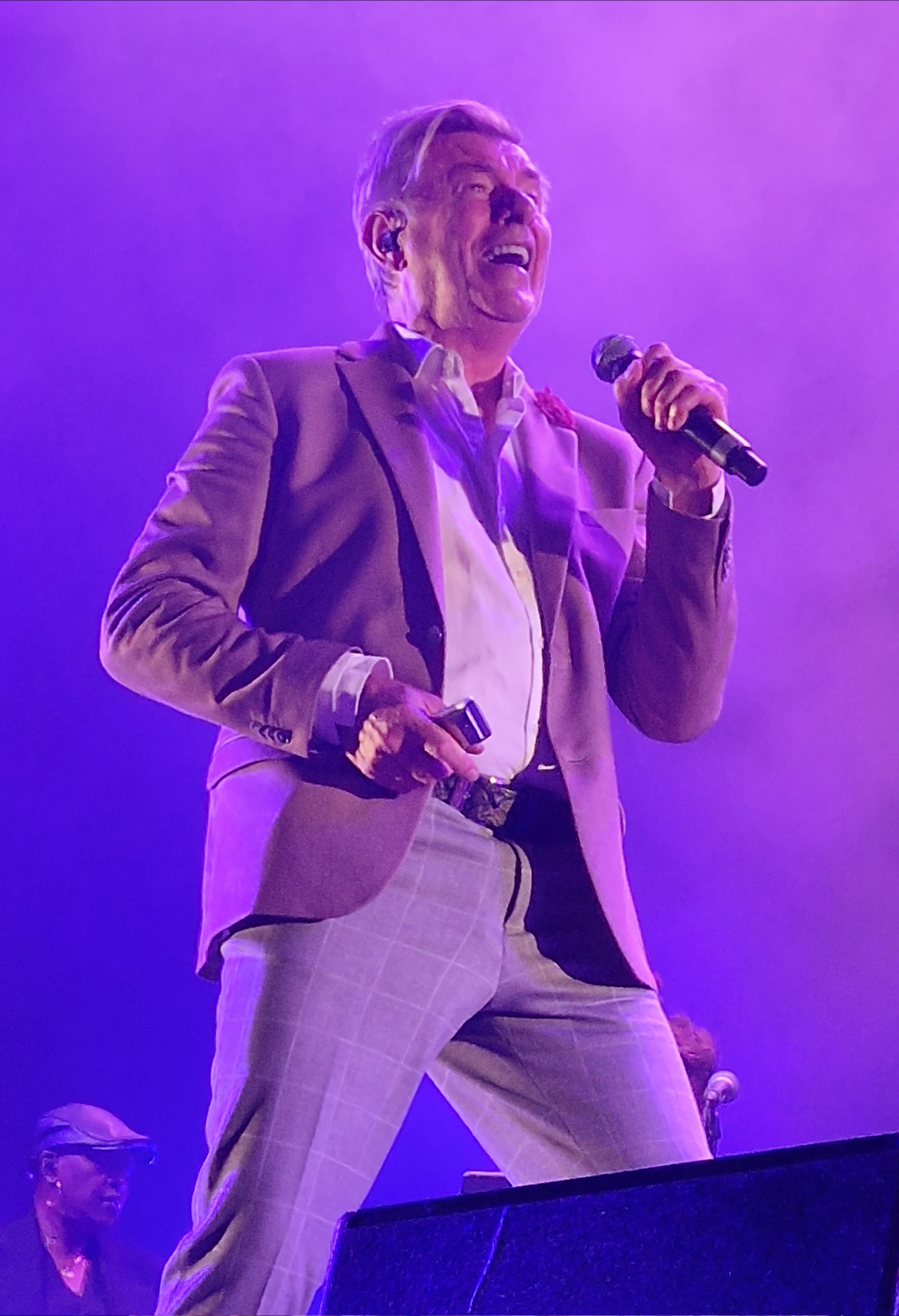
- Jan Leyers performing with Soulsister in 2012 Paul Michiels performing in 2025

Background information
- Origin: Belgium
- Genres: Pop, soul, funk
- Years active: 1986–1995, 2007–2023
- Label: EMI
- Members: Jan Leyers; Paul Michiels
- Website: soulsister.be

Soulsister is a Belgian music band consisting of Jan Leyers and main vocalist Paul Michiels that initially existed from 1986 to 1995 and, after a split, reunited in 2007. Soulsister is often designated as SoulSister, the Soul Sisters or Leyers, Michiels and SoulSister.

Leyers had previous experience in the rock group Beri-Beri, while Michiels had experience in the British rock group Octopus and as a solo artist.

== History ==
The group formed in 1985 after Leyers and Michiels met each other in Michiels' hometown of Heist-op-den-Berg (Leyers, for his part, is a native of Wilrijk). They debuted that year under the name the Soul Sisters with a single titled "You Get to Me". Later on, they also released the singles "Talk About It" and "Like a Mountain". They had a huge hit with 1989's "The Way to Your Heart", a Motown-sounding song that reached the 41st position of the Billboard Hot 100 in the United States while also achieving success in Belgium, the Netherlands, and Germany. In 1988, the group changed its name to SoulSister and their first official album, It Takes Two, was released, with Michiels on keyboards and Leyers on the guitar, with various musicians on back-up. EMI signed the deal and published the album.

In 1990, the band underwent another change in name, this time to Leyers, Michiels and SoulSister. Later that same year, they released Heat, which included the hit singles "Through Before We Started", "Sweet Dreamer" and "Well Well Well". Some of the songs on the album allowed Leyers, who was admittedly more into rock than soul, show off his skills on the electric guitar.

The group started a triple run in 1992. That year, they released the album Simple Rule, which included a hit title track, as well as "Broken" and "Ain't That Simple". The following year, the group released a live album, Live Savings. In the meantime, Leyers was asked to co-write "That's As Close as I Get To...", a song sung by American country singer Aaron Tippin.

In 1994, the group began its final chapter with the album Swinging Like Big Dogs. Popular tracks from this album were "Wild Love Affair", "If This is Love", "Tell Me What it Takes" and "I Need Some Time". By this time, the group had gone back to being known simply as SoulSister. In 1995, SoulSister split up, and in 1997, EMI released a Very Best Of compilation album.

Meanwhile, both Leyers and Michiels had gone their separate ways. Michiels went solo performing the same soulful, Motown-sounding music that made SoulSister a success, while Leyers joined with Filip Cauwelier and Joost Van den Broek in the rock band My Velma (named after a character in the Raymond Chandler novel Farewell, My Lovely).

Leyers and Michiels teamed up again in 2000 to record individual songs for the Jan Verheyen movie Team Spirit. Leyers performed a track titled "Only Your Love Will Do" while Michiels recorded a cover of the Alphaville song "Forever Young".

The duo reunited in 2007 after an incidental studio session in the summer of 2006. In March 2008, Soulsister performed three concerts in Sportpaleis in Antwerp. In Autumn 2011, the band starting touring again in Belgium.

They received the Lifetime Achievement Award at the presentation of the 2021 MIAs.

In 2023, Michiels announced a second split of Soulsister. Leyers would focus on TV work in the future, while Michiels will relaunch his solo career.

== Discography ==
=== Albums ===
- 1988: It Takes Two
- 1990: Heat
- 1992: Simple Rule
- 1994: Swinging Like Big Dogs
- 2008: Closer
- 2011: Soulsister Live

=== Compilation albums ===
- 1997: Very Best of Soulsister
- 2003: Het Beste Van
- 2004: Original Hits
- 2007: Platinium Collection

=== Singles ===
- 1988: "Like a Mountain" [#59 Netherlands]
- 1988: "The Way to Your Heart" [#3 Belgium, #4 Germany, #6 Austria, #8 Switzerland, #8 Netherlands, #41 US, #81 UK]
- 1989: "Blame You" [#43 Belgium]
- 1990: "Downtown" [#46 Belgium]
- 1990: "Through Before We Started" [#3 Belgium, #51 Germany, #56 Netherlands]
- 1991: "Well well well" [#9 Belgium]
- 1991: "Company" [#15 Belgium]
- 1991: "Facing Love" [#9 Belgium]
- 1991: "She's Gone" [#19 Belgium]
- 1992: "Locks and Keys" [#15 Belgium]
- 1992: "Promises" [#15 Belgium]
- 1992: "Changes" [#10 Belgium]
- 1993: "Broken" [#5 Belgium, #30 Austria, #32 Switzerland, #42 Netherlands, #51 Germany]
- 1993: "Ain't That Simple" [#24 Belgium]
- 1993: "Simple rule" [#29 Belgium]
- 1993: "So long ago" [#31 Belgium]
- 1994: "Wild love affair" [#15 Belgium]
- 1995: "Tell Me What It Takes" [#2 Belgium]
- 1995: "I Need Some Time" [#43 Belgium]
- 1999: "Try Not to Cry" [#46 Belgium]
- 2007: "Back in a Minute"
- 2008: "How Many Waterfalls" [#5 Belgium]
- 2010: "Last Call"
- 2021: "Something I need to know" [#49 Belgium]
- 2022: "I Need Your Love" [#49 Belgium]
