= Paul Michiels =

Belgian singer and songwriter (born 1948)

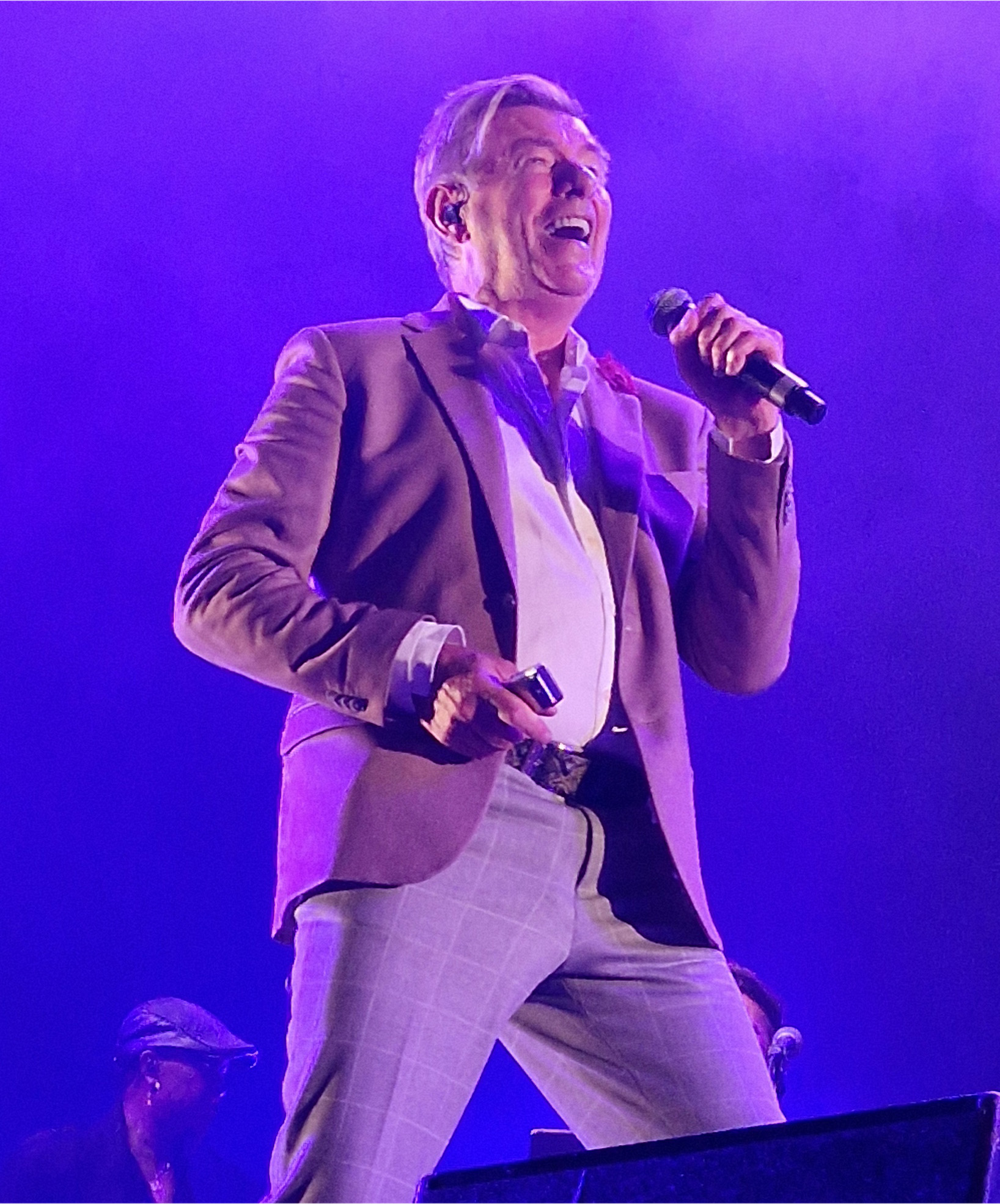
- Michiels performing in 2025

Background information
- Born: 15 June 1948 (age 77)
- Origin: Heist-op-den-Berg, Belgium
- Genres: Pop, jazz, soul
- Years active: 1974–present

Paul Anna Kamiel Michiels (born 15 June 1948) is a Belgian singer and songwriter who became popular for his work with the Belgian music group Soulsister. He has earned the nickname Polle Pap, a name he inherited from a childhood job as a milkman in his hometown of Heist-op-den-Berg, where he was born.

Paul started out with a small band called Purple Bus. From 1974 until 1980, he played keyboards for a British-Belgian band called Octopus. After Octopus broke up, Paul then went solo under the name P.P. Michiels. Under that name, he became famous in his home country for a single titled "Females," which notoriously became popular because it was accompanied by a seducing music video.

In 1986, Paul teamed up with Belgian singer Jan Leyers to form the group The Soul Sisters. They released three very popular singles: "You Get to Me," "Talk About It" and "Like a Mountain." In 1988, they changed their name to Soulsister and hit it big time with the soulful, Motown-sounding song "The Way to Your Heart" on their first album, It Takes Two. The band changed their name again in 1990, this time to Leyers, Michiels, and SoulSister, and released Heat. They released two more studio albums and a live album, and released a "Very Best Of" compilation in 1997 following their split.

After splitting away, Paul returned to his solo career. In 1998, he released The Inner Child, which included the hit "One Day at a Time." In 2001, Paul released a personal compilation titled Forever Young, which included the title song by Alphaville (which Paul sang for the 2000 Belgian movie Team Spirit) as well as pieces by Eddie Cochran, Jacques Dutronc, Donovan, Dionne Warwick, The Wallace Collection, Easybeats, Eddie Floyd, and other artists from Europe and North America.

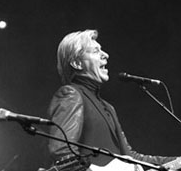
Michiels with Soulsister in 2026

Paul refrained from releasing another album too soon, but stayed on tour with the "Big M's," the name of his band. In 2006, he released a third solo album, Magic in the House. The album featured the singles "If I Live, If I Breathe" and "The Light," the latter being released as both a standard and instrumental piece.

== Bibliography ==
- http://houbi.com/belpop/groups/michiels.htm
- http://www.paulmichiels.be/v1/biografie/biografie.php
