= Jan Leyers =

Belgium singer-songwriter, television personality

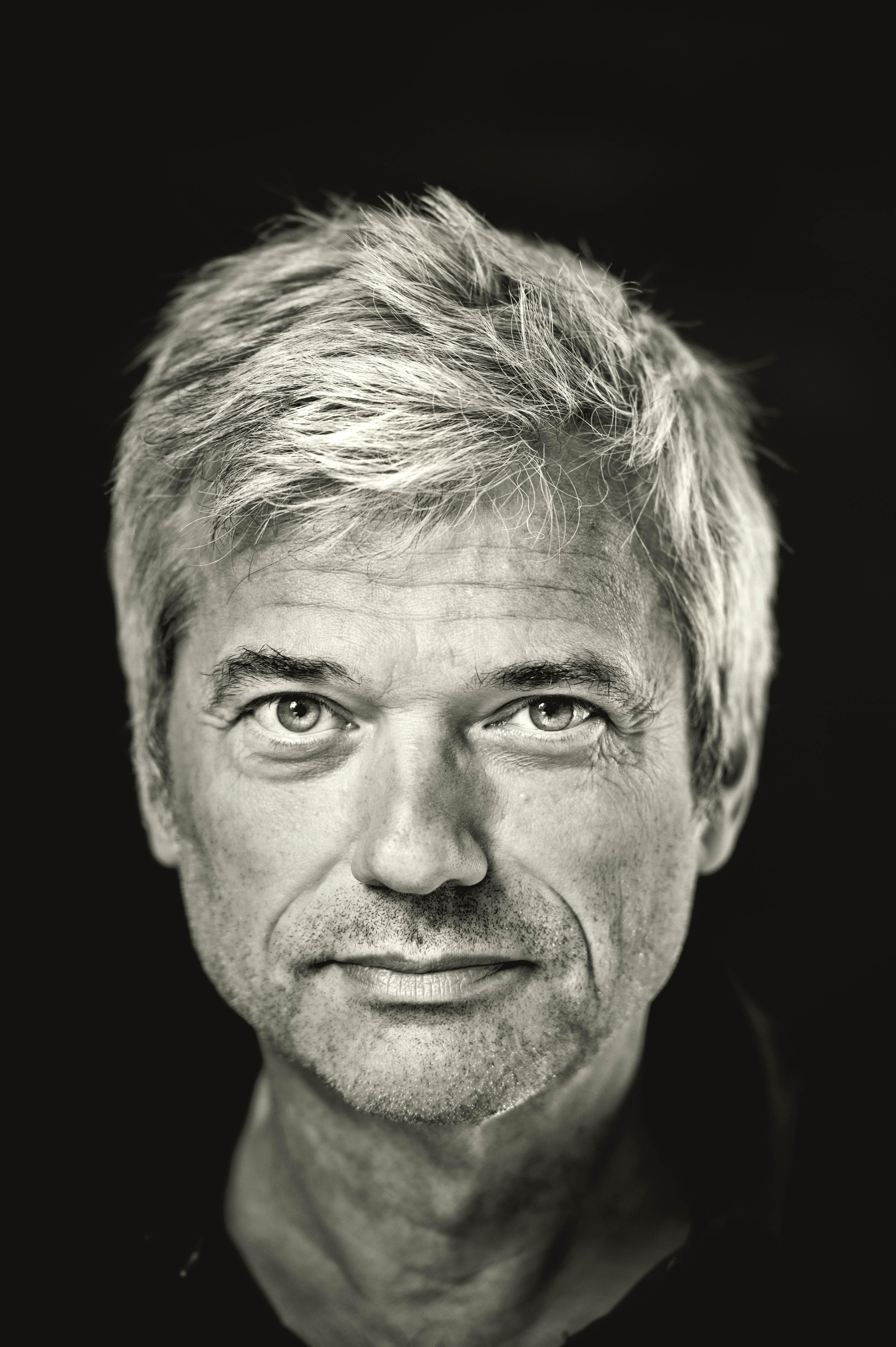
- Jan Leyers, 2016

Background information
- Born: Jan Anna August Leyers; 16 May 1958 (age 67)
- Origin: Wilrijk, Belgium
- Genres: Rock, pop
- Instrument: Guitar
- Years active: 1978–present
- Website: janleyers.be

Jan Anna August Leyers (born 16 May 1958 in Wilrijk, Belgium) is a Belgian singer, songwriter, and television personality. He was a member of the group Soulsister and later became a solo musician and host of various television series.

== Music career ==
Jan Leyers was born in Wilrijk, in Antwerp. When he was about 10 years old, he found an acoustic guitar in his attic, and his father, an architect, taught him how to play. 10 years later, he started the group Beri-Beri with Hugo Matthysen, Bart Peeters, and Marc Kruithof. The group tried for some years to become successful, but failed.

After Beri-Beri, Leyers spent a few years singing in theaters. In 1986, he met singer Paul Michiels in a café in Heist-op-den-Berg. Together, they recorded a single, "You Get to Me," which impressed Guy Brulez, an executive for EMI in Belgium. Brulez persuaded them to form a duo, which they named "Soul Sisters'". They recorded "Talk About It" and "Like a Mountain." The group, now under the name SoulSister, released their debut album, It Takes Two, in 1988. The single "The Way to Your Heart" was a hit in Belgium, the Netherlands, Germany, and even made its way onto the United States charts.

In 1990, SoulSister changes its moniker to Leyers, Michiels, and SoulSister for a while, but then reverted to SoulSister. They released three more studio albums: Heat, Simple Rule, and Swinging Like Big Dogs (which Leyers co-produced with Joey Balin, an EMI executive). In between, Leyers pursued solo songwriting endeavours.

In 1997, SoulSister officially dissolved with the release of their Very Best Of compilation album. Leyers, now on a solo track, teamed up with Filip Cauwelier and Joost Van den Broek to form the group My Velma. SoulSister had performed melodic pop, but My Velma (which takes its name from Velma, the girlfriend of a mob boss in the Raymond Chandler book Farewell, My Lovely) did harder rock. The group started off with two test singles: "Running a Bath" and "Shower of Love." In October 1997, the group recorded the album Exposed. It was released in June 1998 by Mercury Records of the Netherlands.

In 2000, Leyers had a big hit in Belgium with the single "Only Your Love Will Do," which was featured on the soundtrack for the Jan Verheyen film Team Spirit. There was also a hit on the soundtrack by his old SoulSister buddy Paul Michiels, and the following year he worked with Michiels on his Forever Young cover album. My Velma broke up at around the same time. Throughout these endeavors, Leyers remained a music producer and composer of music for films.

In 2003, Leyers released the album Jan Leyers, which became popular with the hits "Crash and Burn" and "Don't Make Me Miss You." It featured his hit from 2000, "Only Your Love Will Do."

On 1 January 2005, Leyers released the single "The Long Road," and soon afterwards begins his 2005 tour in Belgium. Later that year, he released the singles "Rolling On" and "Break My Heart." In September, he released In the Virgin Dark, which features these three singles along with "This One" and "The Remedy." "This One" is featured in the Jan Verheyen movie Buitenspel ("Off-side").

In the fall of 2006, he released Songbook: 1996–2006, a compilation of his work with My Velma and his solo work.

== Songwriting ==
In 1995, Leyers co-wrote, alongside Sally Dworsky and Paul Jefferson, the song "That's as Close as I'll Get to Loving You," which is performed by American country singer Aaron Tippin. He does songwriting on a regular basis for the Belgian band Clouseau. One of his top hits with Clouseau is "Dat Ze De Mooiste Is (That She's Most Beautiful)". He has written two songs ("I've Only Begun To Fight" and "I Want You Back", both soundtracks of "Team Spirit 2") for Natalia's first album This Time and one song ("Get Back") for her second album Back For More.

== Television career ==
Leyers is the host of Nachtwacht ("Nightwatch"), a cultural discussion program on Canvas (Belgium). The show features people from across Belgium debating various topics from comedy to religion. Leyers was a co-host of De Droom van Ludwig ("The Dream of Ludwig"), which traced Ludwig van Beethoven's history across Europe. He has served as a judge on Idool 2004, Belgium's version of Idol. In 2007 he made the television series De weg naar Mekka ("The road to Mecca"), in which he travelled across North Africa and the Middle East. His account also appeared in a book of the same title. Four years later, in 2011, another television series appeared called "De weg naar het Avondland" ("Road to the Evening Land"). Leyers travels from Ethiopia to Europe in this series, "following the footsteps of humanity". In 2017, ten years after De weg naar Mekka he made the television series "Allah in Europa" where he travels European cities to find out the future of Islam in Europe. The corresponding book was published in 2018.

== Personal life ==
Leyers is married to Belgian TV actress Anne Meunier. They have four daughters: Dorien, Ella, Billie, and Olga. They reside in Hove, Belgium.

== Discography ==
- Jan Leyers (2003)
- In the Virgin Dark (2005)
