= List of downloadable songpacks for the SingStar series =

SingStar is a series of music video games developed by London Studio and published by Sony Computer Entertainment for the PlayStation 2 and PlayStation 3 video game consoles. Gameplay in the SingStar games requires players to sing along to music in order to score points, using SingStar-specific USB microphones which ship with the game. Over 70 different SingStar SKUs have been released worldwide, featuring over 1,500 disc-based songs.

Editions of SingStar for the PlayStation 3 support downloadable content in the form of additional songs for the game. Almost all songs are able to be purchased individually, although some songs can only be purchased in themed packs of five. Over 1600 songs have been made available as downloadable content, including a total of 569 English-language songs. Songs are made available worldwide where possible, although regional differences exist due to licensing and censorship restrictions. The success of the SingStore exceeded the expectations of the game's developers, with over 2.2 million songs purchased from the online service as of August 2008.

== Songpacks ==
Theme	Titles	AUS	UK	US
80s	"(I Just) Died In Your Arms" – Cutting Crew	Yes	Yes	Yes
80s	"I Wanna Dance With Somebody (Who Loves Me)" – Whitney Houston	Yes	Yes	Yes
80s	"Let's Dance" – David Bowie	Yes	Yes	Yes
80s	"China In Your Hand" – T'Pau	Yes	Yes	Yes
80s	"Opposites Attract" – Paula Abdul	Yes	Yes	Yes
Alain Souchon	"Quand Je Serai KO"	Yes	Yes	Yes
Alain Souchon	"Le Baiser"	Yes	Yes	Yes
Alain Souchon	"Parachute Dore"	Yes	Yes	Yes
Alain Souchon	"Sous Les Jupes des Filles"	Yes	Yes	Yes
Alain Souchon	"Ultra Moderne Solitude"	Yes	Yes	Yes
Amy Winehouse	"Love Is a Losing Game"	Yes	Yes	No
Amy Winehouse	"Tears Dry on Their Own"	Yes	Yes	No
Amy Winehouse	"Back to Black"	Yes	Yes	No
Amy Winehouse	"You Know I'm No Good"	Yes	Yes	No
Amy Winehouse	"Rehab"	Yes	Yes	No
Blondie	"Call Me"	Yes	Yes	Yes
Blondie	"Hanging on the Telephone"	Yes	Yes	Yes
Blondie	"Atomic"	Yes	Yes	Yes
Blondie	"Heart of Glass"	Yes	Yes	Yes
Blondie	"Rapture"	Yes	Yes	Yes
Britney Spears	"(You Drive Me) Crazy"	Yes	Yes	Yes
Britney Spears	"Born to Make You Happy"	Yes	Yes	Yes
Britney Spears	"I Love Rock N Roll"	Yes	Yes	Yes
Britney Spears	"Stronger"	Yes	Yes	Yes
Britney Spears	"Oops!...I Did It Again"	Yes	Yes	Yes
Crowded House	"Don't Dream It's Over"	Yes	Yes	Yes
Crowded House	"Fall at Your Feet"	Yes	Yes	Yes
Crowded House	"Four Seasons in One Day"	Yes	Yes	Yes
Crowded House	"It's Only Natural"	Yes	Yes	Yes
Crowded House	"Weather with You"	Yes	Yes	Yes
Die Fantastischen Vier	"Die Da!?!"	Yes	Yes	No
Die Fantastischen Vier	"Der Picknicker"	Yes	Yes	No
Die Fantastischen Vier	"MfG – Mit freundlichen Gruben"	Yes	Yes	No
Die Fantastischen Vier	"Geboren"	Yes	Yes	No
Die Fantastischen Vier	"Sie Ist Weg"	Yes	Yes	No
Depeche Mode 1	"A Question of Time"	Yes	Yes	Unknown
Depeche Mode 1	"Halo"	Yes	Yes	Unknown
Depeche Mode 1	"Strangelove"	Yes	Yes	Unknown
Depeche Mode 1	"Master and Servant"	Yes	Yes	Unknown
Depeche Mode 1	"Stripped"	Yes	Yes	Unknown
Depeche Mode 2	"I Feel You"	Yes	Yes	Unknown
Depeche Mode 2	"Everything Counts"	Yes	Yes	Unknown
Depeche Mode 2	"Personal Jesus"	Yes	Yes	Unknown
Depeche Mode 2	"Precious"	Yes	Yes	Unknown
Depeche Mode 2	"Shake the Disease"	Yes	Yes	Unknown
Dizzee Rascal	"Bonkers"	Yes	Yes	Yes
Dizzee Rascal	"Flex"	Yes	Yes	Yes
Dizzee Rascal	"Holiday"	Yes	Yes	Yes
Dizzee Rascal	"Dance wiv Me" feat. Calvin Harris	Yes	Yes	Yes
Dizzee Rascal	"Fix Up, Look Sharp"	Yes	Yes	Yes
Duran Duran	"Save a Prayer"	Yes	Yes	Yes
Duran Duran	"Girls on Film"	Yes	Yes	Yes
Duran Duran	"Ordinary World"	Yes	Yes	Yes
Duran Duran	"Hungry Like the Wolf"	Yes	Yes	Yes
Duran Duran	"Rio"	Yes	Yes	Yes
Eddy Grant	"Gimme Hope Jo'anna"	Yes	Yes	No
Eddy Grant	"Electric Avenue"	Yes	Yes	No
Eddy Grant	"Living on the Front Line"	Yes	Yes	No
Eddy Grant	"Baby Come Back"	Yes	Yes	No
Eddy Grant	"I Don't Wanna Dance"	Yes	Yes	No
Essentials: Country	"Born to Fly" – Sara Evans	Yes	Yes	Yes
Essentials: Country	"What Do Ya Think About That" – Montgomery Gentry	Yes	Yes	Yes
Essentials: Country	"A Broken Wing" – Martina McBride	Yes	Yes	Yes
Essentials: Country	"Honky Tonk Badonkadonk" – Trace Adkins	Yes	Yes	Yes
Essentials: Country	"You're Gonna Miss This" – Trace Adkins	Yes	Yes	Yes
Essentials: Party Picks	"Get the Party Started" – P!nk	Yes	Yes	Yes
Essentials: Party Picks	"I'm Outta Love" – Anastacia	Yes	Yes	Yes
Essentials: Party Picks	"Hey Ya!" – OutKast	Yes	Yes	Yes
Essentials: Party Picks	"You Sexy Thing" – Hot Chocolate	Yes	Yes	Yes
Essentials: Party Picks	"Relax" – Frankie Goes to Hollywood	Yes	Yes	Yes
Euro Anthems	"My Number One" – Helena Paparizou	Yes	Yes	No
Euro Anthems	"Hard Rock Hallelujah" – Lordi	Yes	Yes	No
Euro Anthems	"Wild Dances" – Ruslana	Yes	Yes	No
Euro Anthems	"Making Your Mind Up" – Bucks Fizz	Yes	Yes	No
Euro Anthems	"Believe" – Dima Bilan	Yes	Yes	No
Festive Fun	"Merry Christmas Everyone" – Shakin' Stevens	Yes	Yes	Yes
Festive Fun	"Christmas Eve" – Céline Dion	Yes	Yes	Yes
Festive Fun	"Have Yourself A Merry Little Christmas" – Toni Braxton	Yes	Yes	Yes
Festive Fun	"Wonderful Christmastime" – Paul McCartney	Yes	Yes	Yes
Festive Fun	"Sleigh Ride" – Babyface	Yes	Yes	Yes
Festive Fun 2	"When a Child is Born" – Johnny Mathis	Yes	Yes	Yes
Festive Fun 2	"Saviour's Day" – Cliff Richard	Yes	Yes	Yes
Festive Fun 2	"Step Into Christmas" – Elton John	Yes	Yes	Yes
Festive Fun 2	"A Cradle In Bethlehem" – Nat King Cole	Yes	Yes	Yes
Festive Fun 2	"Have Yourself A Merry Little Christmas" – Doris Day	Yes	Yes	Yes
Football Anthems	"Tubthumping" – Chumbawamba	Yes	Yes	No
Football Anthems	"Eat My Goal" – Collapsed Lung	Yes	Yes	No
Football Anthems	"Back Home" – England Football Team 70	Yes	Yes	No
Football Anthems	"Three Lions" – Lightning Seeds	Yes	Yes	No
Football Anthems	"We Are the Champions" – Queen	Yes	Yes	No
Il Divo	"All by Myself"	Yes	Yes	Yes
Il Divo	"Ave Maria"	Yes	Yes	Yes
Il Divo	"Unbreak My Heart"	Yes	Yes	Yes
Il Divo	"Mama"	Yes	Yes	Yes
Il Divo	"The Power Of Love"	Yes	Yes	Yes
Il Pop Italiano	"Salir?" – Daniele Silvestri	Unknown	Yes	Unknown
Il Pop Italiano	"Maracaibo" – Lu Colombo	Unknown	Yes	Unknown
Il Pop Italiano	"E fuori ? buio" – Tiziano Ferro	Unknown	Yes	Unknown
Il Pop Italiano	"Vita spericolata" – Vasco Rossi	Unknown	Yes	Unknown
Il Pop Italiano	"Boy Band" – Velvet	Unknown	Yes	Unknown
Island Records	"Harvest for the World" – The Christians	Yes	Yes	No
Island Records	"Chelsea Dagger" – The Fratellis	Yes	Yes	No
Island Records	"Big Girl (You Are Beautiful)" – Mika	Yes	Yes	No
Island Records	"Common People" – Pulp	Yes	Yes	No
Island Records	"With Or Without You" – U2	Yes	Yes	No
Lady Gaga	"Bad Romance"	Yes	Yes	No
Lady Gaga	"Eh, Eh (Nothing Else I Can Say)"	Yes	Yes	No
Lady Gaga	"Just Dance"	Yes	Yes	No
Lady Gaga	"LoveGame"	Yes	Yes	No
Lady Gaga	"Poker Face"	Yes	Yes	No
Lionel Richie and The Commodores	"All Night Long" – Lionel Richie	Yes	Yes	No
Lionel Richie and The Commodores	"Angel" – Lionel Richie	Yes	Yes	No
Lionel Richie and The Commodores	"Hello" – Lionel Richie	Yes	Yes	No
Lionel Richie and The Commodores	"Easy" – The Commodores	Yes	Yes	No
Lionel Richie and The Commodores	"Three Times A Lady" – The Commodores	Yes	Yes	No
Lostprophets	"Burn Burn"	Yes	Yes	Yes
Lostprophets	"Last Summer"	Yes	Yes	Yes
Lostprophets	"Last Train Home"	Yes	Yes	Yes
Lostprophets	"Rooftops"	Yes	Yes	Yes
Lostprophets	"The Fake Sound of Progress"	Yes	Yes	Yes
Love songs	"If I Let You Go" – Westlife	Yes	Yes	No
Love songs	"Leave Right Now" – Will Young	Yes	Yes	No
Love songs	"Eternal Flame" – The Bangles	Yes	Yes	No
Love songs	"Love Song" – Sara Bareilles	Yes	Yes	No
Love songs	"The Power of Love" – Frankie Goes to Hollywood	Yes	Yes	No
No Doubt	"Don't Speak"	No	Yes	No
No Doubt	"Ex-Girlfriend"	No	Yes	No
No Doubt	"Hella Good"	No	Yes	No
No Doubt	"Just A Girl"	No	Yes	No
No Doubt	"Running"	No	Yes	No
Party Starters	"Walking on Sunshine" – Katrina and the Waves	Yes	Yes	Yes
Party Starters	"Wannabe" – Spice Girls	Yes	Yes	Yes
Party Starters	"Girls Just Wanna Have Fun" – Cyndi Lauper	Yes	Yes	Yes
Party Starters	"Let Me Entertain You" – Robbie Williams	Yes	Yes	Yes
Party Starters	"It's Raining Men" – The Weather Girls	Yes	Yes	Yes
Paul McCartney	"Pipes of Peace"	Yes	Yes	Yes
Paul McCartney	"Mull of Kintyre" – Wings	Yes	Yes	Yes
Paul McCartney	"Ebony and Ivory" with Stevie Wonder	Yes	Yes	Yes
Paul McCartney	"Band on the Run" – Wings	Yes	Yes	Yes
Paul McCartney	"Dance Tonight"	Yes	Yes	Yes
Pop Ballads	"Building a Mystery" – Sarah McLachlan	No	No	Yes
Pop Ballads	"Eternal Flame" – The Bangles	No	No	Yes
Pop Ballads	"Love Song" – Sara Bareilles	No	No	Yes
Pop Ballads	"You Found Me" – The Fray	No	No	Yes
Pop Ballads	"The Power of Love" – Frankie Goes to Hollywood	No	No	Yes
Pop Classics	"What's Love Got To Do With It" – Tina Turner	Yes	Yes	Yes
Pop Classics	"Heart of Glass" – Blondie	Yes	Yes	Yes
Pop Classics	"Take On Me" – A-ha	Yes	Yes	Yes
Pop Classics	"Karma Chameleon" – Culture Club	Yes	Yes	Yes
Pop Classics	"Rio" – Duran Duran	Yes	Yes	Yes
Pop Stars	"These Words" – Natasha Bedingfield	Yes	Yes	Yes
Pop Stars	"Torn" – Natalie Imbruglia	Yes	Yes	Yes
Pop Stars	"...Baby One More Time" – Britney Spears	Yes	Yes	Yes
Pop Stars	"Hit 'Em Up Style (Oops!)" – Blu Cantrell	Yes	Yes	Yes
Pop Stars	"Sk8er Boi" – Avril Lavigne	Yes	Yes	Yes
Queen Ultimate 1	"Bohemian Rhapsody"	Yes	Yes	No
Queen Ultimate 1	"Crazy Little Thing Called Love"	Yes	Yes	No
Queen Ultimate 1	"Killer Queen"	Yes	Yes	No
Queen Ultimate 1	"Bicycle Race"	Yes	Yes	No
Queen Ultimate 1	"One Vision"	Yes	Yes	No
Queen Ultimate 2	"We Are the Champions"	Yes	Yes	No
Queen Ultimate 2	"We Will Rock You"	Yes	Yes	No
Queen Ultimate 2	"I Want It All"	Yes	Yes	No
Queen Ultimate 2	"Who Wants To Live Forever"	Yes	Yes	No
Queen Ultimate 2	"Another One Bites the Dust"	Yes	Yes	No
Queen Ultimate 3	"Tie Your Mother Down"	Yes	Yes	No
Queen Ultimate 3	"I'm in Love with My Car"	Yes	Yes	No
Queen Ultimate 3	"Fat Bottomed Girls"	Yes	Yes	No
Queen Ultimate 3	"Somebody to Love"	Yes	Yes	No
Queen Ultimate 3	"You're My Best Friend"	Yes	Yes	No
Queen Ultimate 4	"Save Me"	Yes	Yes	No
Queen Ultimate 4	"Play the Game"	Yes	Yes	No
Queen Ultimate 4	"I Want to Break Free"	Yes	Yes	No
Queen Ultimate 4	"Hammer to Fall"	Yes	Yes	No
Queen Ultimate 4	"It's a Hard Life"	Yes	Yes	No
Queen Ultimate 5	"These Are the Days of Our Lives"	Yes	Yes	No
Queen Ultimate 5	"Innuendo"	Yes	Yes	No
Queen Ultimate 5	"Headlong"	Yes	Yes	No
Queen Ultimate 5	"Princes of the Universe"	Yes	Yes	No
Queen Ultimate 5	"Under Pressure" with David Bowie	Yes	Yes	No
Rock Anthems	"Total Eclipse of the Heart" – Bonnie Tyler	Yes	Yes	Yes
Rock Anthems	"More Than a Feeling" – Boston	Yes	Yes	Yes
Rock Anthems	"Should I Stay or Should I Go" – The Clash	Yes	Yes	Yes
Rock Anthems	"Eye of the Tiger" – Survivor	Yes	Yes	Yes
Rock Anthems	"Final Countdown" – Europe	Yes	Yes	Yes
Roxette Ballads	"Run to You"	Yes	Yes	Yes
Roxette Ballads	"Spending My Time"	Yes	Yes	Yes
Roxette Ballads	"Listen to Your Heart"	Yes	Yes	Yes
Roxette Ballads	"It Must Have Been Love"	Yes	Yes	Yes
Roxette Ballads	"Fading Like a Flower (Every Time You Leave)"	Yes	Yes	Yes
Roxette Rocks	"Dressed for Success"	Yes	Yes	No
Roxette Rocks	"Wish I Could Fly"	Yes	Yes	No
Roxette Rocks	"Joyride"	Yes	Yes	No
Roxette Rocks	"Sleeping in My Car"	Yes	Yes	No
Roxette Rocks	"The Look"	Yes	Yes	No
The Saturdays	"Chasing Lights"	Yes	Yes	No
The Saturdays	"Fall"	Yes	Yes	No
The Saturdays	"Issues"	Yes	Yes	No
The Saturdays	"Set Me Off"	Yes	Yes	No
The Saturdays	"Up"	Yes	Yes	No
Singstar Essentials: For Boys	"She's So Lovely" – Scouting For Girls	Yes	Yes	Yes
Singstar Essentials: For Boys	"U Can't Touch This" – MC Hammer	Yes	Yes	Yes
Singstar Essentials: For Boys	"Losing My Religion" – R.E.M.	Yes	Yes	Yes
Singstar Essentials: For Boys	"Pumping on Your Stereo" – Supergrass	Yes	Yes	Yes
Singstar Essentials: For Boys	"High and Dry" – Radiohead	Yes	Yes	Yes
Singstar Essentials: For Girls	"We Are Family" – Sister Sledge	Yes	Yes	Yes
Singstar Essentials: For Girls	"Never Ever" – All Saints	Yes	Yes	Yes
Singstar Essentials: For Girls	"Greatest Love of All" – Whitney Houston	Yes	Yes	Yes
Singstar Essentials: For Girls	"Respectable" – Mel and Kim	Yes	Yes	Yes
Singstar Essentials: For Girls	"Bitch" – Meredith Brooks	Yes	Yes	Yes
SingStar Sizzlers	"LDN" – Lily Allen	Yes	Yes	Yes
SingStar Sizzlers	"Summertime" – DJ Jazzy Jeff & The Fresh Prince	Yes	Yes	Yes
SingStar Sizzlers	"Barbara Ann" – The Beach Boys	Yes	Yes	Yes
SingStar Sizzlers	"Sing it Back" – Moloko	Yes	Yes	Yes
SingStar Sizzlers	"Daydream Believer" – The Monkees	Yes	Yes	Yes
Snow Patrol	"Run"	Yes	Yes	No
Snow Patrol	"Spitting Games"	Yes	Yes	No
Snow Patrol	"Chocolate"	Yes	Yes	No
Snow Patrol	"Set the Fire to the Third Bar" with Martha Wainwright	Yes	Yes	No
Snow Patrol	"Shut Your Eyes"	Yes	Yes	No
Snow Patrol 2	"Chasing Cars"	Yes	Yes	No
Snow Patrol 2	"Crack The Shutters"	Yes	Yes	No
Snow Patrol 2	"Signal Fire"	Yes	Yes	No
Snow Patrol 2	"Take Back The City"	Yes	Yes	No
Snow Patrol 2	"You're All I Have"	Yes	Yes	No
Starter Pack: Classic Hits	"Think Twice" – Céline Dion	No	Yes	No
Starter Pack: Classic Hits	"Personal Jesus" – Depeche Mode	No	Yes	No
Starter Pack: Classic Hits	"Don't Let Me Get Me" – P!nk	No	Yes	No
Starter Pack: Classic Hits	"Prince Charming" – Adam and the Ants	No	Yes	No
Starter Pack: Classic Hits	"Rebel Rebel" – David Bowie	No	Yes	No
Starter Pack: Exitos en castellano	"Como camarón" – Estopa	No	No	No
Starter Pack: Exitos en castellano	"La Sonrisa De La Luna" – Ilsa	No	No	No
Starter Pack: Exitos en castellano	"La Oreja De Van Gogh" – Inmortal	No	No	No
Starter Pack: Exitos en castellano	"Labuat" – Soy Tu Aire	No	No	No
Starter Pack: Exitos en castellano	"Somos" – Melocos	No	No	No
Star Pack: Hits Van Eigen Bodem	"Scared of Yourself" – Zornik	No	Yes	No
Star Pack: Hits Van Eigen Bodem	"Life on Mars?" – Jasper Steverlinck	No	Yes	No
Star Pack: Hits Van Eigen Bodem	"Anne" – Clouseau	No	Yes	No
Star Pack: Hits Van Eigen Bodem	"Het Is Een Nacht" – Guus Meeuwis & Vagant	No	Yes	No
Star Pack: Hits Van Eigen Bodem	"Onderweg" – Abel	No	Yes	No
Starter Pack: Norske klassikere	"Idyll" – Postgirobygget	No	Yes	No
Starter Pack: Norske klassikere	"Nei, Sa Tjukk Du Har Blitt" – Ole Ivars	No	Yes	No
Starter Pack: Norske klassikere	"Svake Mennesker" – Jannicke	No	Yes	No
Starter Pack: Norske klassikere	"En Solskinnsdag" – Postgirobygget	No	Yes	No
Starter Pack: Norske klassikere	"Fairytale" – Alexander Rybak	No	Yes	No
Starter Pack: Party-Kracher	"Lebt Denn Dr Alte Holmichel Noch" – De Randfichten	No	Yes	No
Starter Pack: Party-Kracher	"Skandal Im Sperrbezirk" – Spider Murphy Gang	No	Yes	No
Starter Pack: Party-Kracher	"Viva Colonia" – Höhner	No	Yes	No
Starter Pack: Party-Kracher	"You're My Heart, You're My Soul" – Modern Talking	No	Yes	No
Starter Pack: Party-Kracher	"You're My Mate" – Right Said Fred	No	Yes	No
Starter Pack: Portugal Pop	"Ferreira Dava Tudo" – Adelaide	No	No	No
Starter Pack: Portugal Pop	"Sopro Do Coração" – Clã	No	No	No
Starter Pack: Portugal Pop	"Encosta-te A Mim" – Jorge Palma	No	No	No
Starter Pack: Portugal Pop	"Leve Beijo Triste" – Paulo Gonzo com Lucia Moniz	No	No	No
Starter Pack: Portugal Pop	"Com Um Brilhozinho Nos Olhos" – Sérgio Godinho	No	No	No
Starter Pack: SuomiHitit	"1972 " – Anssi Kela	No	No	No
Starter Pack: SuomiHitit	"Nämä ajat eivät ole meitä varten" – Egotrippi	No	No	No
Starter Pack: SuomiHitit	"Puhu äänellä jonka kuulen" – Happoradio	No	No	No
Starter Pack: SuomiHitit	"Valehdellaan" – Katri Ylander	No	No	No
Starter Pack: SuomiHitit	"Lautturi" – PMMP	No	No	No
Starter Pack: Svenska Favoriter	"Armarula Tree" – Amanda Jenssen	No	No	No
Starter Pack: Svenska Favoriter	"What's in It for Me" – Amy Diamond	No	No	No
Starter Pack: Svenska Favoriter	"Diggi-Loo Diggi-Ley" – Herrey's	No	No	No
Starter Pack: Svenska Favoriter	"3AM" – Kleerup feat. Marit Bergman	No	No	No
Starter Pack: Svenska Favoriter	"Good Song" – Salem Al Fakir	No	No	No
Stereophonics	"Could You Be The One?"	Unknown	Yes	No
Stereophonics	"Have a Nice Day"	Unknown	Yes	No
Stereophonics	"Innocent"	Unknown	Yes	No
Stereophonics	"Just Looking"	Unknown	Yes	No
Stereophonics	"Maybe Tomorrow"	Unknown	Yes	No
The Jackson 5	"ABC"	Yes	Yes	No
The Jackson 5	"I'll Be There"	Yes	Yes	No
The Jackson 5	"Never Can Say Goodbye"	Yes	Yes	No
The Jackson 5	"Mama's Pearl"	Yes	Yes	No
The Jackson 5	"Dancing Machine"	Yes	Yes	No
Ultimate Billy Joel	"We Didn't Start the Fire"	Yes	Yes	Yes
Ultimate Billy Joel	"Piano Man"	Yes	Yes	Yes
Ultimate Billy Joel	"Tell Her About It"	Yes	Yes	Yes
Ultimate Billy Joel	"Uptown Girl"	Yes	Yes	Yes
Ultimate Billy Joel	"Just the Way You Are"	Yes	Yes	Yes
Ultimate Coldplay 1	"Speed of Sound"	Yes	Yes	Yes
Ultimate Coldplay 1	"Clocks"	Yes	Yes	Yes
Ultimate Coldplay 1	"Yellow"	Yes	Yes	Yes
Ultimate Coldplay 1	"The Hardest Part"	Yes	Yes	Yes
Ultimate Coldplay 1	"The Scientist"	Yes	Yes	Yes
Ultimate Coldplay 2	"Don't Panic"	Yes	Yes	Yes
Ultimate Coldplay 2	"In My Place"	Yes	Yes	Yes
Ultimate Coldplay 2	"Trouble"	Yes	Yes	Yes
Ultimate Coldplay 2	"Lost!"	Yes	Yes	Yes
Ultimate Coldplay 2	"Violet Hill"	Yes	Yes	Yes
Ultimate Krezip	"Don't Crush Me"	Yes	Yes	Yes
Ultimate Krezip	"I Would Stay"	Yes	Yes	Yes
Ultimate Krezip	"All Unsaid"	Yes	Yes	Yes
Ultimate Krezip	"Everything and More"	Yes	Yes	Yes
Ultimate Krezip	"You Can Say"	Yes	Yes	Yes
Ultimate Madness	"Our House"	Yes	Yes	No
Ultimate Madness	"Driving In My Car"	Yes	Yes	No
Ultimate Madness	"My Girl"	Yes	Yes	No
Ultimate Madness	"Baggy Trousers"	Yes	Yes	No
Ultimate Madness	"House of Fun"	Yes	Yes	No
Ultimate Natalia	"Fragile Not Broken"	Yes	Yes	Yes
Ultimate Natalia	"I Survived You"	Yes	Yes	Yes
Ultimate Natalia	"I Want You Back"	Yes	Yes	Yes
Ultimate Natalia	"Gone to Stay"	Yes	Yes	Yes
Ultimate Natalia	"I've Only Begun to Fight"	Yes	Yes	Yes
Ultimate Take That	"A Million Love Songs"	Yes	Yes	No
Ultimate Take That	"Never Forget"	Yes	Yes	No
Ultimate Take That	"Pray"	Yes	Yes	No
Ultimate Take That	"It Only Takes a Minute"	Yes	Yes	No
Ultimate Take That	"Babe"	Yes	Yes	No
Ultimate US5	"In The Club"	Yes	Yes	Yes
Ultimate US5	"Just Because of You"	Yes	Yes	Yes
Ultimate US5	"Mama"	Yes	Yes	Yes
Ultimate US5	"Maria"	Yes	Yes	Yes
Ultimate US5	"Rhythm of Life"	Yes	Yes	Yes
Ultimate Westlife	"Flying Without Wings"	Yes	Yes	Yes
Ultimate Westlife	"Fool Again"	Yes	Yes	Yes
Ultimate Westlife	"If I Let You Go"	Yes	Yes	Yes
Ultimate Westlife	"World of Our Own"	Yes	Yes	Yes
Ultimate Westlife	"Queen of my Heart"	Yes	Yes	Yes
Vagrant Records	"Screaming Infidelities" – Dashboard Confessional	Yes	Yes	Yes
Vagrant Records	"Stay Positive" – The Hold Steady	Yes	Yes	Yes
Vagrant Records	"A Fact of Life" – FACT	Yes	Yes	Yes
Vagrant Records	"Can't Be Saved" – Senses Fail	Yes	Yes	Yes
Vagrant Records	"At Your Funeral" – Saves the Day	Yes	Yes	Yes
