= US5 discography =

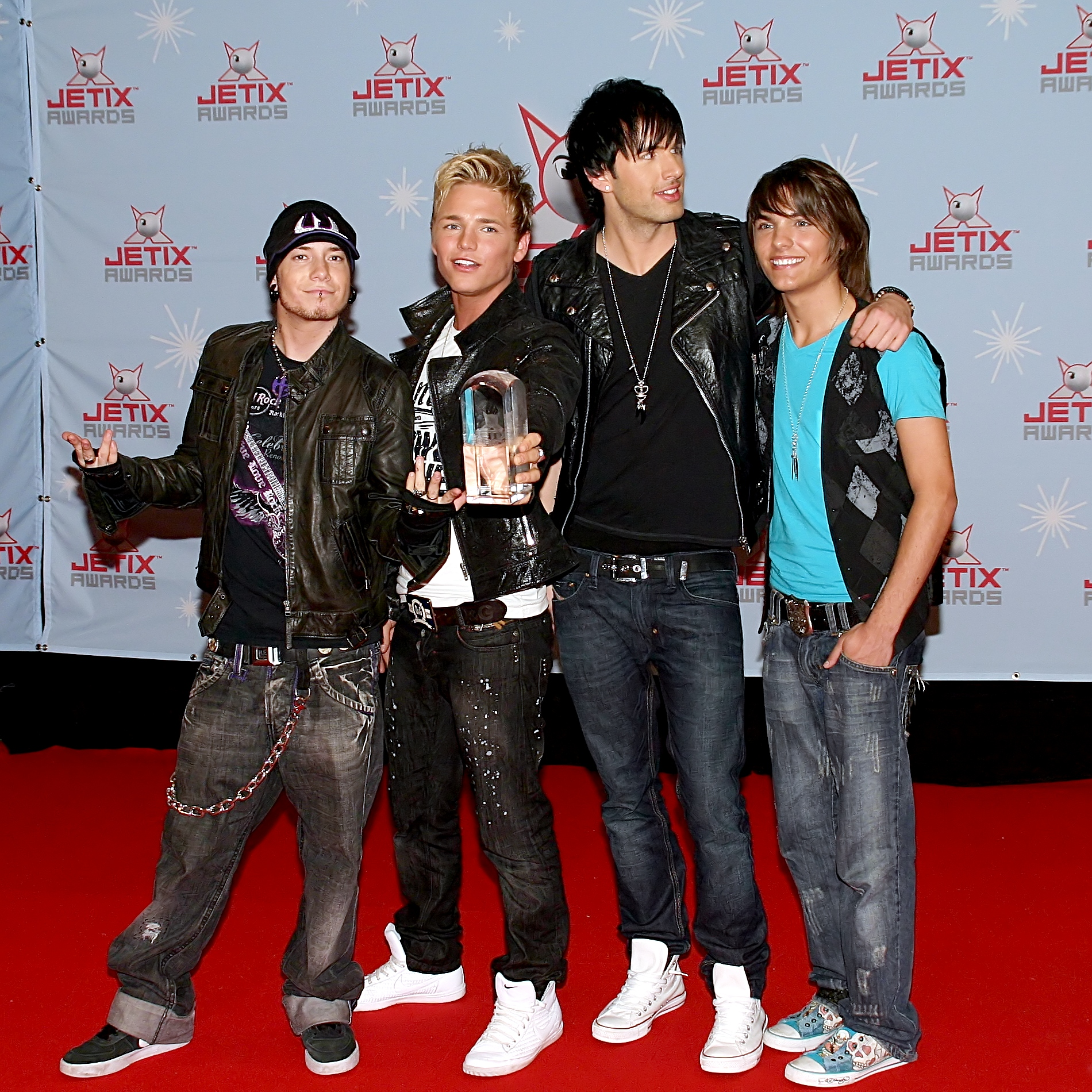
- US5 in Berlin in 2008.
- Studio albums: 4
- Singles: 10
- Video albums: 4
- Music videos: 11

This discography is an overview of the musical works of the multinational boy band US5. According to the sources, they have sold more than twelve million records to date. Their most successful release is the single "Maria" with over 650,000 units sold.

== Studio albums ==
List of albums, with selected chart positions and certifications
Title	Album details	Peak chart positions			Certifications
Title	Album details	GER	AUT	SWI	Certifications
Here We Go	Released: 18 November 2005; Label: Triple M, Global, Universal; Formats: CD, digital download	5	7	23	AUT: Gold; GER: 3× Gold
In Control	Released: 24 November 2006; Label: Triple M, Universal; Formats: CD, digital download	6	7	44	
Around the World	Released: 14 November 2008; Label: Triple M, Universal; Formats: CD, digital download	38	62	—	
Back Again	Released: 27 November 2010; Label: Major; Formats: CD, digital download	—	—	—	

== Singles ==
=== As lead artist ===
Title	Year	Peak chart positions						Album
Title	Year	GER	AUT	SWI	UK	POL	EU	Album
"Maria"	2005	1	4	8	38	5	9	Here We Go
"Just Because of You"	2005	3	3	8	—	42	14	Here We Go
"Come Back to Me Baby"	2006	3	4	4	—	58	9	Here We Go – New Edition
"Mama"	2006	4	6	18	—	77	16	Here We Go – New Edition
"In the Club"	2006	2	2	15	—	1	13	In Control
"One Night with You"	2007	2	8	38	—	2	15	In Control
"Rhythm of Life (Shake It Down)"	2007	4	6	25	—	4	18	In Control – Reloaded
"Too Much Heaven" (featuring Robin Gibb)	2007	7	26	—	—	61	68	In Control – Reloaded
"Round and Round"	2008	7	17	72	—	—	—	Around the World
"The Boys Are Back"	2008	14	29	—	—	—	—	Around the World
"Anytime"	2009	—	—	—	—	—	—	Back Again

=== Other singles ===
- "One of Us" (2005)
- "Boom" (2006)
- "365 Days" (2007)
- "Every Other Day" (2007)
- "Around The World" (2008)

== DVDs ==
- US5 – The History (2005)
- Here We Go – Live & Private (2006)
- US5 – Live In Concert (2006)
- US5 On Holiday (2008)

== Music videos ==
Year	Title	Album
2005	"Maria"	Here We Go
2005	"Just Because of You"	Here We Go
2006	"Come Back to Me Baby"	Here We Go – New Edition
2006	"Mama"	Here We Go – New Edition
2006	"In The Club"	In Control
2007	"One Night With You"/"365 Days"	In Control
2007	“Rhythm of Life (Shake It Down)”	In Control – Reloaded
2007	"Too Much Heaven"	In Control – Reloaded
2008	"Round & Round"	Around the World
2008	"The Boys Are Back"	Around the World
