= Songs of Innocence (disambiguation) =

Songs of Innocence is an illustrated collection of poems by William Blake, the first book of two in Songs of Innocence and Experience.

Songs of Innocence may also refer to:

- Songs of Innocence: The Story of British Childhood, a book by Fran Abrams

== Music ==
- Song of Innocence, a 1968 album and its title track by David Axelrod
- "Song of Innocence", a song by Terry Scott Taylor from album Knowledge & Innocence, 1986
- Songs of Innocence, album by Norman Curtis with Peggy Smith, 1953
- Songs of Innocence, a classical recital album by Andrew Swait (treble), James Bowman (countertenor), with Andrew Plant, Signum 2007
- Songs of Innocence (Jasper Steverlinck album), 2004
- Songs of Innocence (U2 album), 2014
- Songs of Innocence, album by Hannes Löschel
- Part 1 of Songs of Innocence and of Experience, musical setting of Blake's poems by William Bolcom

== Television ==
- "Songs of Innocence", the second episode of the sixth season of the TV series Pretty Little Liars

== See also ==
- Songs of Experience (disambiguation)
- Songs of Innocence and of Experience (disambiguation)
