= Back for More =

Back for More may refer to:

== Music ==
=== Albums ===
- Back for More (Natalia album), a 2004 album by Belgian singer Natalia
  - Back for More Live, a 2005 concert DVD by Natalia
- Back for More (Shawn Desman album), a 2005 album by Canadian singer Shawn Desman

=== Songs ===
- "Back for More" (Five Finger Death Punch song), a 2011 song by American heavy metal band Five Finger Death Punch
- "Back for More" (Glenn Lewis song), a 2003 R&B/hip-hop song by Glenn Lewis
- "Back for More" (Tomorrow X Together and Anitta song), a 2023 single by Tomorrow X Together and Anitta
- "Back for More", a heavy metal song by Ratt from the 1984 album Out of the Cellar
- "Back For More", a 2001 song by A-Teens from their 2001 album Teen Spirit
- "Back for more", a song by Garou from his 2008 album Piece of My Soul

== Video games ==
- Back 4 More, a proposed title for the video game Left 4 Dead 2
- Back For More, a Five Nights at Freddy's-inspired computer game by Nexagonal

== See also ==
- Come Back for More, a 1958 novel by Al Fray
- Sometimes They Come Back... for More, a 1999 film by Daniel Zelik Berk
