= You Are =

You Are may refer to:

== Songs ==
- "You Are" (Aaron Goodvin song), 2018
- "You Are" (Atomic Kitten song), 2001
- "You Are" (Colton Dixon song), 2012
- "You Are" (Jimmy Wayne song), 2004
- "You Are" (Lionel Richie song), 1983
- "You Are", by Arid from All Is Quiet Now
- "You Are", by Built to Spill from Ancient Melodies of the Future
- "You Are", by Charlie Wilson
- "You Are", by Dolly Parton from New Harvest – First Gathering
- "You Are", by Elemeno P from Trouble in Paradise
- "You Are", by Estelle featuring John Legend from Shine
- "You Are", by Glen Campbell from Still Within the Sound of My Voice
- "You Are", by Got7 from 7 for 7
- "You Are", by Matt Brouwer from Unlearning
- "You Are", by Pearl Jam from Riot Act
- "You Are", by Ruth from Secondhand Dreaming
- "You Are", by Tony Moran featuring Frenchie Davis
- "You Are (Variations)", a work for voices and chamber orchestra by Steve Reich
- "You Are", by Armin van Buuren featuring Sunnery James & Ryan Marciano
