= Rhythm of Life (disambiguation) =

Rhythm of Life is the 1983 debut album by Paul Haig. The phrase may also refer to:

- "Rhythm of Life", a song by Oleta Adams from the 1990 album Circle of One
- "Rhythm of Life", a song by Richard Marx from the 1987 album Richard Marx
- "Rhythm of Life", a song by Status Quo from the 2002 album Heavy Traffic
- "Rhythm of Life", a song by US5 from the 2006-07 album In Control Reloaded
- Rhythm of Life, a 2008 Singaporean television series
- "The Rhythm of Life", a song from the 1966 Broadway musical Sweet Charity
