= Risin' =

Single by Natalia

from the album Back For More
- B-side: "Risin' remix"
- Released: 2004
- Recorded: 2004
- Genre: Pop/Gospel
- Length: 4:05
- Label: Sony BMG
- Songwriters: Janice Robinson, Portia Neeley Rolle & Sandy B'
- Producer: Steve Willaert

Natalia singles chronology
"I Want You Back" (2004)	"Risin'" (2004)	"Fragile Not Broken" (2006)

Risin' is Natalia's fifth single that has been written by Janice Robinson and Portia Neeley Rolle. It was released in Belgium as the first single of her second album Back For More on August 9, 2004. On October 3, 2005 it was released in the Netherlands. The clip shows the concert of Natalia during Marktrock 2004, a large festival in Belgium, and some backstage scenes. Risin' became a huge hit immediately. It won the "Tien Om Te Zien summer trophy", a music show, after being released 2 weeks. Natalia's previous single "I Want You Back" (which was released in May 2004) ended up second in the contest.

== Charts ==
Chart (2005)	Peak position
Belgium (Ultratop 50 Flanders)	2

== Music video ==
In the music video, Natalia performs on the mainstage of Marktrock in Leuven. She is also in the backstage preparing and giving signatures to fans.
