= Come Back to Me Baby =

Single by US5

from the album Here We Go
- Released: 10 February 2006
- Length: 3:53
- Label: Triple M; Global; Universal
- Songwriters: Dashiel Andrews; MM Dollar; Mike Michaels; Sammy Naja; TK-Roxx
- Producers: Mark Dollar; Mike Michaels; Sammy Naja

US5 singles chronology
"Just Because of You" (2005)	"Come Back to Me Baby" (2006)	"Mama" (2006)

"Come Back To Me Baby" is a song by German–American boy band US5. It was written by Dashiel Andrews, MM Dollar, Mike Michaels, Sammy Naja, and Jay "TK-Roxx" Khan for the reissue of their debut studio album Here We Go (2005). Production was helmed by Dollar, Michaels, and Naja. The song peaked at number three on the German Singles Chart and reached number four in Austria and Switzerland, respectively.

== Music video ==
The video for the song was the first to be filmed in Germany. US5 stood in front of the camera in December 2005 in Potsdam. As with "Maria" and "Just Because of You", Oliver Sommer was the director. At four minutes and 43 seconds, this video is the longest the band has ever produced. The video shows that Richie had a fight with his girlfriend, two senior citizens who are a couple in a building and the band singing in CGI.

== Track listings ==
CD single
No.	Title	Writer(s)	Producer(s)	Length
1.	"Come Back to Me Baby" (Single Edit)	Dashiel Andrews; MM Dollar; Mike Michaels; Sammy Naja; TK-Roxx	Dollar; Michaels; Naja	3:53
2.	"The Day You Cried" (Ivan Gogh Remix)	Andrews; Dollar; Michaels; Naja; TK-Roxx	Dollar; Michaels; Naja; Ivan Gogh^{[a]}	3:31
3.	"Come Back to Me Baby" (Rock Remix)	Andrews; Dollar; Michaels; Naja; TK-Roxx	Dollar; Michaels; Naja; Ivan Gogh^{[a]}	3:33
4.	"Come Back to Me Baby" (Felyx Lighter Remix)	Andrews; Dollar; Michaels; Naja; TK-Roxx	Dollar; Michaels; Naja; DJ Felyx Lighter^{[a]}; Antoine Montana^{[a]}	4:12
5.	"Come Back to Me Baby" (Instrumental)	Andrews; Dollar; Michaels; Naja; TK-Roxx	Dollar; Michaels; Naja	3:53

Notes

- ^{^a} denotes additional producer

== Charts ==
=== Weekly charts ===
Chart (2006)	Peak position
Austria (Ö3 Austria Top 40)	4
Germany (GfK)	3
Switzerland (Schweizer Hitparade)	4

=== Year-end charts ===
Chart (2006)	Position
Austria (Ö3 Austria Top 40)	57
Germany (Media Control GfK)	61
Switzerland (Schweizer Hitparade)	81
