= Little Things of Venom =

Studio album by Arid
- Released: 1998
- Genre: Alternative rock
- Length: 46:10
- Label: Double T/Columbia
- Producer: David Anderson

Arid chronology
Little Things of Venom (1998)	All Is Quiet Now (2002)

Professional ratings
Review scores
Source	Rating
Allmusic	3/5 stars

Little Things of Venom is the first album by Belgian band Arid. It was first released in 1998 under Belgium's Double T record label, and again in 2000 by Columbia Records in the United States, under the name At the Close of Every Day.

== Track listing ==
- All songs written by Jasper Steverlinck and David Du Pré.
1. "At the Close of Every Day" – 3:41
2. "Too Late Tonight" – 4:01
3. "All Will Wait" – 3:47
4. "Little Things of Venom" – 4:35
5. "Believer" – 3:30
6. "Dearly Departed" – 5:41
7. "Me and My Melody" – 5:02
8. "World Weary Eyes" – 3:10
9. "Life" – 4:27
10. "Elegy" – 3:08

== Bonus track ==
On the Austrian and U.S. releases of the album, an eleventh track titled "Soirée" was included. It runs for 5:13.

== Licensing ==
Track four, "Little Things Of Venom", was used in the soundtrack for the IMAX 3-D film Haunted Castle (2001), in which lead singer Steverlinck also starred.

== Certifications ==
Region	Certification	Certified units/sales
Belgium (BRMA)	Gold	25,000^{*}
^{*} Sales figures based on certification alone.
