= Transcoder (band) =

Belgian alternative rock band

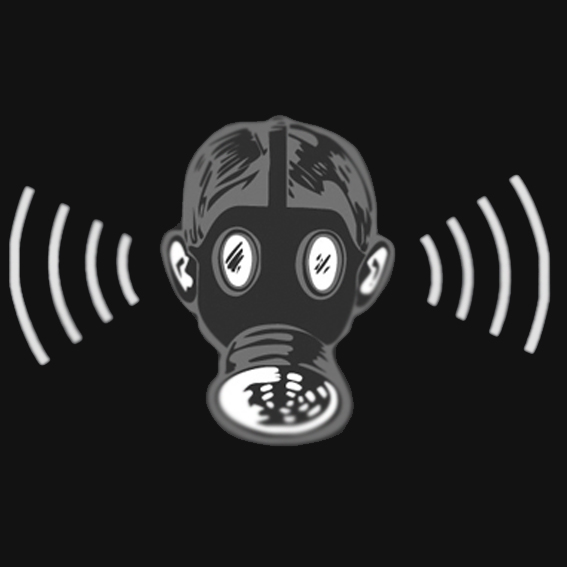
- Transcoder logo

Background information
- Origin: Bruges, West Flanders, Belgium
- Genres: Blues rock, punk rock, new wave, grunge, stoner rock
- Years active: 2008-present
- Members: Jan Van Acker; Miguel Wish; Jonathan Veriez; Steve Lehnen; Minco De Bruin
- Past members: Maarten Baert; Philip Verbrugge
- Website: http://www.transcoder.be/

Transcoder is a Belgian alternative rock band, founded in 2010, consisting of five members: Jan Van Acker (vocals), Jonathan Veriez (guitar), Steve Lehnen (guitar), Miguel Wensch (bass) and Minco De Bruin (drums).

Steven Van Havere, drummer of the Belgian rock band Arid, was quickly impressed by the Transcoder sound and invited the band as support for an Arid concert that took place on February 19, 2011, at Ancienne Belgique in Brussels.

Shortly afterwards, Transcoder was invited by singer and TV-star Jasper Steverlinck (Arid) to be his “Poulains". “De Poulains” is a radio & TV-show for national station Studio Brussels, in which four settled musicians present their favourite upcoming band. For this occasion, they returned to the Ancienne Belgique to perform live on February 6 of 2011.

In March 2012, Transcoder released a video clip for their first single, Fading Flame, starring singer and radio/TV presenter Roos Van Acker. The band ‘s first EP “For My Blood”, produced by Luc van Acker, will be released in February 2013.

== Influences ==
Band members are inspired by bands such as The Stooges, Sonic Youth, Joy Division, and Radiohead among others. In addition, their iPods are dominated by blues, garage punk, new wave, stoner rock and grunge.
