= Higher than the Sun =

Higher than the Sun may refer to:

- "Higher than the Sun" (song), a 2013 song by Keane
- "Higher than the Sun", a 1991 song by Primal Scream from Screamadelica
- "Higher than the Sun", a 2003 song by Natalia Druyts from This Time
- "Higher than the Sun", a 2005 episode of Eureka Seven
- "Higher than the Sun", a 2013 song by Peace from In Love
