= Wise Girl =

Wise Girl may refer to:

- Wise Girl (film), a 1937 screwball comedy starring Miriam Hopkins and Ray Milland
- Wise Girl (album), by Belgian singer Natalia
- Die Kluge (The Wise [Girl]), an opera by Carl Orff

== See also ==
- Wise Girls (film), a 1929 film
- WiseGirls, a 2002 film most notably featuring Mariah Carey
