= One Night with You =

One Night with You may refer to:

- "One Night with You" (song), song by US5, later covered by Luther Vandross
- "One Night with You", a song by Gino Vannelli from A Pauper in Paradise
- One Night with You: The Best of Love, Volume 2, a compilation album of Luther Vandross
- One Night (Elvis Presley song), song by Elvis Presley
- One Night with You (1932 film), an Italian film
- One Night with You (1948 film), a British film
