= All Is Quiet Now =

Studio album by Arid
- Released: 2002
- Genre: Alternative rock
- Length: 36:09
- Label: Epic
- Producer: Mark Howard

Arid chronology
Little Things Of Venom (1998)	All Is Quiet Now (2002)	Live (2003)

All Is Quiet Now is the second studio album by Belgian band Arid. It was released in 2002 by Epic Records, an imprint of Sony BMG.

== Track listing ==
- All tracks written by David Du Pré and Jasper Steverlinck, except "I Wish I Was All Of That", composed by Du Pré, Steverlinck and Filip Ros.
1. "All I Did (Was Get Close To You)" – 3:26
2. "You Are" – 3:24
3. "Silent Reproach" – 4:11
4. "The Body Of You" – 3:57
5. "Everlasting Change" – 3:02
6. "Wintertime" – 3:54
7. "I Wonder How Come" – 3:54
8. "Move Your Head" – 3:18
9. "I Wish I Was All Of That" – 3:26
10. "Million Lights" – 3:35

== Charts ==
=== Weekly charts ===
Chart (2002)	Peak position
Belgian Albums (Ultratop Flanders)	3
Belgian Albums (Ultratop Wallonia)	9
Dutch Albums (Album Top 100)	76

=== Year-end charts ===
Chart (2002)	Position
Belgian Albums (Ultratop Flanders)	31
