= Songs of Innocence and of Experience (disambiguation) =

Songs of Innocence and of Experience is an illustrated collection of poems by William Blake in two volumes.

Songs of Innocence and of Experience and variants may also refer to:

== Music ==
- Songs of Innocence and Experience (Allen Ginsberg album), 1969
- Songs of Innocence and Experience, album by Caprice, 2002
- Songs of Innocence and Experience - Hope and Science, compilation album by The Echoing Green, 2006
- Songs of Innocence and Experience, album by The Emotions, 1972
- Songs of Innocence and Experience, string quartet piece by Walter Zimmermann, 1996
- Songs of Innocence and of Experience, album by Adequate Seven, 2003
- Songs of Innocence and of Experience (Greg Brown album), 1986
- Songs of Innocence and of Experience, musical setting of Blake's poems by William Bolcom, 1984
  - Songs of Innocence and of Experience, Grammy-winning 2005 classical album of the songs, also known as Bolcom: Songs of Innocence and of Experience
- Song of Innocence (1968) and Songs of Experience (1969), albums by David Axelrod
- Songs of Innocence (U2 album) (2014) and Songs of Experience (U2 album) (2017), albums by U2

== Theatre ==
- Songs of Innocence and Experience (song cycle), a 2005 work by William Finn

== See also ==
- Songs of Experience (disambiguation)
- Songs of Innocence (disambiguation)
