= The Voice van Vlaanderen season 1 =

The Voice van Vlaanderen is a Belgian reality talent show. The 1st season of the Flemish version premiered on November 25, 2011 on the vtm television network.

The coaches for the debut seasons were Natalia Druyts, one of the most popular recording artists of Flandern and close runner-up of the first season of Idool, Koen Wauters, host and judge of several casting shows and band member of Clouseau, Jasper Steverlinck, who was topping the Flemish single charts with a cover of Life on Mars and Alex Callier from Flemish band Hooverphonic. The winner of this season was Glenn Claes from team Jasper.

== Blind auditions ==
Key	Coach hit his or her "I WANT YOU" button	Contestant eliminated with no coach pressing his or her "I WANT YOU" button	Contestant defaulted to this coach's team	Contestant elected to join this coach's team

=== Episode 1: November 25, 2011 ===
Order	Contestant	Song	Coaches' and Contestants' Choices			
Order	Contestant	Song	Alex Callier	Jasper Steverlinck	Koen Wauters	Natalia Druyts
1	Lien Vervoort	"Nobody's Wife"			—	
2	Joke Vincke	"Use Somebody"		—	—	—
3	Bert Voordeckers	"Girl, You'll be a woman soon"				
4	Maxine Eeckeloo	"Someone Like You"				
5	Maureen Alberg	"Proud Mary"	—	—	—	—
6	Willem Coppenolle en Bart Barends	"All Shook Up"	—	—	—	
7	Inge Van Gaver	"River Deep Mountain High"		—	—	
8	Jolien Teuwen	"Mad About You"	—	—	—	—
9	Thea Van Damme	"Valerie"			—	—
10	Glenn Claes	"I Shot the Sheriff"				
11	Patricia Lalomia	"Listen"	—	—	—	—
12	Dirk Cassiers	"Hard To Handle"				
13	Thomas Cassiers	"Ordinary People"	—		—	—

=== Episode 2: 2 December 2011 ===
Order	Contestant	Song	Coaches' and Contestants' Choices			
Order	Contestant	Song	Alex Callier	Jasper Steverlinck	Koen Wauters	Natalia Druyts
1	Axelle Aerts	"It's a man's, man's, man's world"				
2	Stephen Dhondt	"Somebody To Love Me"	—	—	—	—
3	Kizi Van Elschot	"What Do You Want From Me"	—			
4	Nikita Wilms	"Total Eclipse of the Heart"	—	—	—	
5	Marie Schoovaerts	"Somewhere over the Rainbow"		—	—	—
6	Rene Paul Harris	"Another Day"	—	—		—
7	Julia Hadian	"Afscheid"	—	—	—	—
8	Kris Ratiau	"I Don't Want to Be"		—	—	
9	Mayken Hoessen	"(What If God Was) One Of Us"				—
10	Caroline Van Gils	"She Will Be Loved"	—	—	—	—
11	Yass Smaali	"The Lazy Song"	—			
12	Gabriëla, Alexandra en Elisabeth Vinken	"Hallelujah"			—	

=== Episode 3: 9 December 2011 ===
Order	Contestant	Song	Coaches' and Contestants' Choices			
Order	Contestant	Song	Alex Callier	Jasper Steverlinck	Koen Wauters	Natalia Druyts
1	Eveline Billiau	"In the arms of an angel"				
2	Nick Beernaert	"A Kind of Magic"			—	
3	Leila Minten	"Save Tonight"	—	—	—	—
4	Wen Bellens	"Hurt"	—	—		—
5	Julia	"Chasing Pavements"	—	—	—	—
6	Wim Vandenberghe	"Hallelujah"				
7	Iris Van Straten	"Back to Black"		—		—
8	Yvette Keijzers	"Piece Of My Heart"	—			
9	Zinno Luxem	"The Edge of Glory"	—	—	—	—
10	Stephanie Oclin	"Nothing Compares"	—			
11	Andries de Winter	"The scientist"	—	—	—	—
12	Stefaan de Winter	"Summertime"		—	—	—
13	Sylvie Vasière	"Lost"	—	—	—	—
14	Ludovic Nyamabo	"Ordinary People"				

=== Episode 4: 16 December 2011 ===
Order	Contestant	Song	Coaches' and Contestants' Choices			
Order	Contestant	Song	Alex Callier	Jasper Steverlinck	Koen Wauters	Natalia Druyts
1	Natalie Schoonbaert	"Heavy Cross"				—
2	Vanessa Issa	"You Can Reach Me"	—	—	—	—
3	Tanguy Van Dooren	"I need a Dollar"				
4	Suzy Verwaest	"This world"			—	—
5	Sofie D'Hondt	"I Love U I Do"	—			—
6	Steffi Oversteyns	"Time After Time"	—	—	—	—
7	Claudia Decaluwé	"Have a little faith"			—	
8	Astrid Wittevrongel	"Big Girls Don't Cry"				—
9	Brent Redant	"I've Got Dreams To Remember"	—	—	—	—
10	Karen Melis	"Make you Feel my Love"	—	—	—	
11	Wendy Satyn	"Girl"	—	—	—	—
12	Katy Satyn	"Man in the Mirror"	—	—	—	—
13	Dimitri Verhoeven	"Let's stay together"			—	
14	Kris Struyven en Harry Hendrickx	"Senza Catene"	—	—	—	

=== Episode 5: 23 December 2011 ===
Order	Contestant	Song	Coaches' and Contestants' Choices			
Order	Contestant	Song	Alex Callier	Jasper Steverlinck	Koen Wauters	Natalia Druyts
1	Kate Desot	"Hurt"	—	—	—	
2	Kathleen Truyts	"Hoeveel ik van je hou"	—	—	—	—
3	Pistice Yoka Mpela	"U Remind Me"				
4	Elisa Guarraci	"The Edge Of Glory"	—	—	—	—
5	Claudia Guarraci	"I Just Want To Make Love To You"		—	—	—
6	Sonia Pelgrims	"Help!"	—	—	—	—
7	Zippora De Brauwer	"You've Got The Love"	—		—	
8	Vincent Ceunen	"Love You More"			—	
9	Lize Colson	"Sunrise"	—		—	
10	Wim Van Poucke	"Wherever You Will Go"	—	—		—
11	Kim Leyers	"Rolling In The Deep"	—	—	—	—
12	Matthias Krüger	"Fast Car"	—			
13	Sammy Dumetier	"Another Day"	—	—	—	—
14	Dimitri Jambé	"This Is The Last Time"	—	—	—	
15	Eva Jacobs	"If I Ain't Got You"				

=== Episode 6: 30 December 2011 ===
Order	Contestant	Song	Coaches' and Contestants' Choices			
Order	Contestant	Song	Alex Callier	Jasper Steverlinck	Koen Wauters	Natalia Druyts
1	Charlotte Buyl	"Mercy"			—	
2	Karim Lequenne	"Time After Time"	—	—	—	
3	Yannie Willems	"I Can't Stand the Rain"	—			—
4	Kenny Belcastro	"Nessun Dorma"		—		—
5	Dorothy Wuyts	"Diep in Mij"	—	—	—	—
6	Eley Van Hemelrijck	"Stand by My Woman"	—	—		
7	Silke Mastbooms	"Right to be Wrong"	—	—	—	
8	Els De Martelaere	"I'm not so Tough"		—		—
9	Kimberley Ceulemans	"Angel"		—	—	—
10	Teresa Orlando	"Sweet about Me"		—	—	—
11	Nathalie Hamelton	"That Man"	—	—		—

=== The Wildcards ===
Order	Contestant	Song	Coaches' Choices			
Order	Contestant	Song	Alex Callier	Jasper Steverlinck	Koen Wauters	Natalia Druyts
1	Jodie Blommaert	"To Make You Feel My Love"		—	—	—
2	Willem Storms	"Creep"		—	—	—
3	Julia "Kristina" Hadian	"Halo"	—	—	—	
4	Wesley Meynendonckx	"Ain't no Sunshine"	—	—		—
5	Sarah Mulowayi	"At Last"	—	—	—	
6	Zinno Luxem	"Drops of Jupiter"	—		—	—
7	Ziggy Venneman	"Papillon"	—		—	—

== Battles ==
Coaches begin narrowing down the playing field by training the contestants with the help of "trusted advisors". Each episode featured eight battles consisting two of pairings from within each team, and each battle concluding with the respective coach eliminating one of the two contestants; the six winners for each coach advanced to the live shows.

Alex Callier	Jasper Steverlinck	Koen Wauters	Natalia Druyts
Christa Jerome	David Poltrock	Vincent Pierins	Bert Gielen

– Battle Winner

=== Episode 7: 6 January 2012 ===
Order	Coach	Contestant	Contestant	Song
1	Koen Wauters	Dirk Cassiers	Sofie D'Hondt	"Firework"
2	Jasper Steverlinck	Zusjes Vinken	Nick Beernaert	"I Still Haven't Found What I'm Looking For"
3	Alex Callier	Claudia Guarraci	Thea Van Damme	"Tainted Love"
4	Natalia Druyts	Silke Mastbooms	Willem Coppenolle en Bart Barends	"Devil in Disguise"
5	Alex Callier	Tanguy Van Dooren	Kenny Belcastro	"Miss Sarajevo"
6	Koen Wauters	Wen Bellens	Matthias Krüger	"Broken Strings"
7	Natalia Druyts	Sarah Mulowayi	Julia "Kristina" Hadian	"Survivor"
8	Jasper Steverlinck	Mayken Hoessen	Ziggy Venneman	"Nine Crimes"

=== Episode 8: 13 January 2012 ===
Order	Coach	Contestant	Contestant	Song
1	Natalia Druyts	Claudia Decaluwé	Yvette Keijzers	"Dancing in the Street"
2	Jasper Steverlinck	Maxine Eeckeloo	Thomas Cassiers	"While My Guitar Gently Weeps"
3	Natalia Druyts	Axelle Aerts	Kate Desot	"Telephone"
4	Koen Wauters	Stephanie Oclin	Rene Paul Harris	"Moves like Jagger"
5	Alex Callier	Kimberley Ceulemans	Jodie Blommaert	"Why Don't You Do Right?"
6	Natalia Druyts	Kris Struyven & Harry Hendrickx	Dimitri Jambé	"You're the Voice"
7	Jasper Steverlinck	Glenn Claes	Zinno Luxem	"If You Let Me Stay"
8	Alex Callier	Eveline Billiau	Dimitri Verhoeven	"Pack Up"
9	Koen Wauters	Els De Martelaere	Wesley Meynendonckx	"I Don't Want to Talk About It"

=== Episode 9: 20 January 2012 ===
Order	Coach	Contestant	Contestant	Song
1	Natalia Druyts	Inge Van Gaver	Nikita Wilms	"Sleeping in my Car"
2	Alex Callier	Kris Ratiau	Willem Storms	"Wonderwall"
3	Natalia Druyts	Yass Smaali	Karim Lequenne	"The Message"
4	Alex Callier	Astrid Wittevrongel	Teresa Orlando	"Non non rien n'a changé"
5	Koen Wauters	Kizi Van Elschot	Wim Van Poucke	"Beast of Burden"
6	Jasper Steverlinck	Wim Vandenberghe	Vincent Ceunen	"Don't Dream It's Over"
7	Alex Callier	Marie Schoovaerts	Joke Vincke	"Just Can't Get Enough"
8	Jasper Steverlinck	Charlotte Buyl	Suzy Verwaest	"Toxic"
9	Koen Wauters	Eva Jacobs	Pistice Yoka Mpela	"Ain't nothing like the real thing"

=== Episode 10: 27 January 2012 ===
Order	Coach	Contestant	Contestant	Song
1	Koen Wauters	Bert Voordeckers	Nathalie Hamelton	"The Lady is a Tramp"
2	Jasper Steverlinck	Lize Colson	Natalie Schoonbaert	"Coming Around Again"
3	Natalia Druyts	Ludovic Nyamabo	Karen Melis	"Easy Lover"
4	Jasper Steverlinck	Zippora De Brauwer	Lien Vervoort	"It's My Life"
5	Koen Wauters	Eley Van Hemelrijck	Yannie Willems	"As"
6	Alex Callier	Iris Van Straten	Stefaan de Winter	"Video Games"

=== The Sing-off ===
Each coach nominates 5 acts from their group to advance to the live shows. The 3 remaining acts per group will do a sing-off for the remaining live show spot.

Sing Off #	Coach	Contestant	Song
Sing Off 1	Natalia Druyts	Inge Van Gaver	"River Deep Mountain High"
Sing Off 1	Natalia Druyts	Yvette Keijzers	"Piece Of My Heart"
Sing Off 1	Natalia Druyts	Kris Struyven en Harry Hendrickx	"Senza Catene"
Sing Off 2	Jasper Steverlinck	Charlotte Buyl	"Mercy"
Sing Off 2	Jasper Steverlinck	Lize Colson	"Sunrise"
Sing Off 2	Jasper Steverlinck	Zippora De Brauwer	"You've Got The Love"
Sing Off 3	Koen Wauters	Stephanie Oclin	"Nothing Compares"
Sing Off 3	Koen Wauters	Wim Van Poucke	"Wherever You Will Go"
Sing Off 3	Koen Wauters	Matthias Krüger	"Fast Car"
Sing Off 4	Alex Callier	Thea Van Damme	"Valerie"
Sing Off 4	Alex Callier	Joke Vincke	"Use Somebody"
Sing Off 4	Alex Callier	Astrid Wittevrongel	"Big Girls Don't Cry"

== Live shows ==
— Contestant was in the bottom and immediately eliminated by the coach
— Contestant was in the bottom and saved after the Sing-Off by the coach
— Contestant was in the bottom and eliminated after the Sing-Off by the coach

=== Episode 11: 3 February 2012 ===
Order	Coach	Contestant	Song	Result
1	Jasper Steverlinck	Wim Vandenberghe	"Big Love"	Eliminated
2	Koen Wauters	Eley Van Hemelrijck	"Señorita"	Eliminated
3	Jasper Steverlinck	Zusjes Vinken	"Bang Bang"	Public Vote
4	Koen Wauters	Bert Voordeckers	"White Room"	Public Vote
5	Jasper Steverlinck	Mayken Hoessen	"You and Your Sister"	The Sing Off
6	Koen Wauters	Els De Martelaere	"Brass in Pocket"	Eliminated
7	Jasper Steverlinck	Maxine Eeckeloo	"I Can't Make You Love Me"	Jasper's Vote
8	Koen Wauters	Pistice Yoka Mpela	"It Girl"	The Sing Off
9	Jasper Steverlinck	Charlotte Buyl	"I Follow Rivers"	Eliminated
10	Koen Wauters	Dirk Cassiers	"Make You Feel My Love"	Public Vote
11	Jasper Steverlinck	Glenn Claes	"I Could Never Take the Place of Your Man"	Public Vote
12	Koen Wauters	Stephanie Oclin	"Weak"	Koen's Vote

=== Episode 12: 10 February 2012 ===
Order	Coach	Contestant	Song	Result
1	Alex Callier	Eveline Billiau	"Heaven"	Public Vote
2	Natalia Druyts	Kris Struyven & Harry Hendrickx	"Caruso"	Public Vote
3	Alex Callier	Willem Storms	"Hey Ya!"	Eliminated
4	Natalia Druyts	Axelle Aerts	"Domino"	Eliminated
5	Alex Callier	Jodie Blommaert	"Anyone Who Had a Heart"	The Sing Off
6	Natalia Druyts	Sarah Mulowayi	"I Want You Back"	Eliminated
7	Alex Callier	Joke Vincke	"Like a Virgin"	Alex' Vote
8	Natalia Druyts	Yass Smaali	"The Most Beautiful Girl in the World"	The Sing Off
9	Alex Callier	Iris Van Straten	"The River"	Public Vote
10	Natalia Druyts	Silke Mastbooms	"American Boy"	Public Vote
11	Alex Callier	Tanguy Van Dooren	"On a Mission"	Eliminated
12	Natalia Druyts	Ludovic Nyamabo	"Work It Out"	Natalia's Vote

=== Episode 13: 17 February 2012 ===
Order	Coach	Contestant	Song	Result
1	Koen Wauters	Pistice Yoka Mpela	"Let's Stay Together"	Eliminated
2	Jasper Steverlinck	Glenn Claes	"The Sound of Silence"	Public Vote
3	Koen Wauters	Dirk Cassiers	"Boogie Down"	Public Vote
4	Jasper Steverlinck	Zusjes Vinken	"Bad Things"	Eliminated
5	Koen Wauters	Stephanie Oclin	"When a Man Loves a Woman"	Koen's Vote
6	Jasper Steverlinck	Mayken Hoessen	"What I Am"	Jasper's Vote
7	Koen Wauters	Bert Voordeckers	"Touch Me"	Koen' Vote
8	Jasper Steverlinck	Maxine Eeckeloo	"Dancing in the Dark"	Jasper's Vote

=== Episode 14: 23 February 2012 ===
Order	Coach	Contestant	Song	Result
1	Natalia Druyts	Kris Struyven en Harry Hendrickx	"Under Pressure"	Eliminated
2	Alex Callier	Iris Van Straten	"Hurt"	Alex' Vote
3	Natalia Druyts	Ludovic Nyamabo	"Lovely Day"	Natalia's Vote
4	Alex Callier	Joke Vincke	"Heartbeats"	Alex' Vote
5	Natalia Druyts	Yass Smaali	"When I Get You Alone"	Natalia's Vote
6	Alex Callier	Jodie Blommaert	"Handbags and Gladrags"	Eliminated
7	Natalia Druyts	Silke Mastbooms	"Ain’t It Funny"	Public Vote
8	Alex Callier	Eveline Billiau	"Unfinished Sympathy"	Public Vote

=== Episode 15: 2 March 2012 ===
Order	Coach	Contestant	Song	Result
1	Koen Wauters	Dirk Cassiers	"Whole Lotta Rosie"	Eliminated
2	Jasper Steverlinck	Mayken Hoessen	"Manic Monday"	Eliminated
3	Alex Callier	Joke Vincke	"Addicted to Love"	Alex' Vote
4	Natalia Druyts	Yass Smaali	"How Will I Know"	Natalia's Vote
5	Koen Wauters	Stéphanie Onclin	"I'm So Lonesome I Could Cry"	Koen's Vote
6	Jasper Steverlinck	Maxine Eeckeloo	"Best of You"	Jasper's Vote
7	Koen Wauters	Bert Voordeckers	"Into My Arms"	Public Vote
8	Alex Callier	Eveline Billiau	"Night Air"	Eliminated
9	Natalia Druyts	Ludovic Nyamabo	"Are You Gonna Go My Way"	Eliminated
10	Alex Callier	Iris Van Straten	"Somebody to Love Me"	Public Vote
11	Natalia Druyts	Silke Mastbooms	"Right Here Waiting"	Public Vote
12	Jasper Steverlinck	Glenn Claes	"Naïve"	Public Vote

=== Semifinals: 9 March 2012 ===
Order	Coach	Contestant	Song	Result
1	Natalia Druyts	Silke Mastbooms	"Girls Just Want to Have Fun"	Finalist
2	Jasper Steverlinck	Maxine Eeckeloo & Glenn Claes	"Big Jet Plane"	—N/a
3	Koen Wauters	Bert Voordeckers	"Heroes"	Finalist
4	Alex Callier	Iris Van Straten	"Martha"	Finalist
5	Natalia Druyts	Silke Mastbooms & Yass Smaali	"Signed, Sealed, Delivered I'm Yours"	—N/a
6	Jasper Steverlinck	Glenn Claes	"Message in a Bottle"	Finalist
7	Jasper Steverlinck	Maxine Eeckeloo	"Run, Baby, Run"	Eliminated
8	Koen Wauters	Bert Voordeckers & Stéphanie Onclin	"Get It On"	—N/a
9	Alex Callier	Joke Vincke	"Sweet Jane"	Eliminated
10	Natalia Druyts	Yass Smaali	"Pour que tu m’aimes encore"	Eliminated
11	Alex Callier	Iris Van Straten & Joke Vincke	"Where the Wild Roses Grow"	—N/a
12	Koen Wauters	Stéphanie Onclin	"Set Fire to the Rain"	Eliminated

Semi-final results

Coach	Contestant	Coach points	Public points	Total points	Result
Koen Wauters	Bert Voordeckers	55	68	123	Advancing to final
Koen Wauters	Stéphanie Onclin	45	32	77	Eliminated
Jasper Steverlinck	Glenn Claes	60	57	117	Advancing to final
Jasper Steverlinck	Maxine Eeckeloo	40	43	83	Eliminated
Natalia Druyts	Silke Mastbooms	59	76	135	Advancing to final
Natalia Druyts	Yass Smaali	41	24	65	Eliminated
Alex Callier	Iris Van Straten	60	69	129	Advancing to final
Alex Callier	Joke Vincke	40	31	71	Eliminated

=== Finals: 17 March 2012 ===
Order	Coach	Contestant	Song
1	Koen Wauters	Bert Voordeckers	"Girl, You'll be a woman soon"
2	Jasper Steverlinck	Glenn Claes	"Have a Nice Day"
3	Alex Callier	Iris Van Straten	"Video Games"
4	Natalia Druyts	Silke Mastbooms	"Hot stuff"
5	Koen Wauters	Bert Voordeckers	"Instant karma!"
6	Alex Callier	Iris Van Straten	"Time to Pretend"
7	Natalia Druyts	Silke Mastbooms	"American boy"
8	Jasper Steverlinck	Glenn Claes	"I Shot the Sheriff"

After Snow Patrol performed Bert Voordeckers and Iris Van Straten, who placed 4th and 3rd respectively, were eliminated with Glenn Claes and Silke Mastbooms advancing to the superfinal. Glenn performed his single "Knight in Shining Armour" and Silke sang "Awake". The results were postponed for the next day.

Final results

Place	Contestant	Coach	Result
1	Glenn Claes	Jasper Steverlinc	52 %
2	Silke Mastbooms	Natalia Druyts	48 %
3	Iris Van Straten	Alex Callier	—N/a
4	Bert Voordeckers	Koen Wauters	—N/a

== Summaries ==
=== Results table ===
–	Contestant was saved by public's vote
–	Contestant was saved by coach's vote
–	Contestant was saved coach after the sing-off
–	Contestant was eliminated

==== Team Jasper ====
Candidate	Battle 1	Battle 2	Battle 3	Battle 4	Sing-Off	Show 1	Show 3	Show 5	Semi-Final	Final
Glenn Claes	—N/a	Safe	—N/a	—N/a	—N/a	Safe	Safe	Safe	Safe (117%)	1st (52%)
Maxine Eeckeloo	—N/a	Safe	—N/a	—N/a	—N/a	Safe	Safe	Safe	Eliminated (83%)	
Mayken Hoessen	Safe	—N/a	—N/a	—N/a	—N/a	Safe	Safe	Eliminated (Show 5)		
De zusjes Vinken	Safe	—N/a	—N/a	—N/a	—N/a	Safe	Eliminated (Show 3)			
Wim Vandenberghe	—N/a	—N/a	Safe	—N/a	—N/a	Eliminated (Sing-Off Show 1)				
Charlotte Buyl	—N/a	—N/a	Safe	—N/a	Safe	Eliminated (Show 1)				
Lize Colson	—N/a	—N/a	—N/a	Safe	Eliminated (Sing-off)					
Zippora De Brauwer	—N/a	—N/a	—N/a	Safe	Eliminated (Sing-off)					
Lien Vervoort	—N/a	—N/a	—N/a	Eliminated (Battle 4)						
Natalie Schoonbaert	—N/a	—N/a	—N/a	Eliminated (Battle 4)						
Suzy Verwaest	—N/a	—N/a	Eliminated (Battle 3)							
Vincent Ceunen	—N/a	—N/a	Eliminated (Battle 3)							
Thomas Cassiers	—N/a	Eliminated (Battle 2)								
Zinno Luxem	—N/a	Eliminated (Battle 2)								
Nick Beernaert	Eliminated (Battle 1)									
Ziggy Venneman	Eliminated (Battle 1)									

==== Team Koen ====
Candidate	Battle 1	Battle 2	Battle 3	Battle 4	Sing-Off	Show 1	Show 3	Show 5	Semi-Final	Final
Bert Voordeckers	—N/a	—N/a	—N/a	Safe	—N/a	Safe	Safe	Safe	Safe (113%)	4th
Stephanie Oclin	—N/a	Safe	—N/a	—N/a	Safe	Safe	Safe	Safe	Eliminated (77%)	
Dirk Cassiers	Safe	—N/a	—N/a	—N/a	—N/a	Safe	Safe	Eliminated (Show 4)		
Pistice Yoka Mpela	—N/a	—N/a	—N/a	Safe	—N/a	Safe	Eliminated (Show 3)			
Els De Martelaere	—N/a	Safe	—N/a	—N/a	—N/a	Eliminated (Sing-Off Show 1)				
Eley Van Hemelrijck	—N/a	—N/a	—N/a	Safe	—N/a	Eliminated (Show 1)				
Wim Van Poucke	—N/a	—N/a	Safe	—N/a	Eliminated (Sing-Off)					
Matthias Krüger	Safe	—N/a	—N/a	—N/a	Eliminated (Sing-Off)					
Nathalie Hamelton	—N/a	—N/a	—N/a	Eliminated (Battle 4)						
Yannie Willems	—N/a	—N/a	—N/a	Eliminated (Battle 4)						
Eva Jacobs	—N/a	—N/a	Eliminated (Battle 3)							
Kizi Van Elschot	—N/a	—N/a	Eliminated (Battle 3)							
Rene Paul Harris	—N/a	Eliminated (Battle 2)								
Wesley Meyendonck	—N/a	Eliminated (Battle 2)								
Sofie D'Hondt	Eliminated (Battle 1)									
Wen Bellens	Eliminated (Battle 1)									

==== Team Alex ====
Candidate	Battle 1	Battle 2	Battle 3	Battle 4	Sing-Off	Show 2	Show 4	Show 5	Semi-Final	Final
Iris Van Straten	—N/a	—N/a	—N/a	Safe	—N/a	Safe	Safe	Safe	Safe (129%)	3rd
Joke Vincke	—N/a	—N/a	Safe	—N/a	Safe	Safe	Safe	Safe	Eliminated (71%)	
Eveline Billiau	—N/a	Safe	—N/a	—N/a	—N/a	Safe	Safe	Eliminated (Show 5)		
Jodie Blommaert	—N/a	Safe	—N/a	—N/a	—N/a	Safe	Eliminated (Show 4)			
Tanguy Van Dooren	Safe	—N/a	—N/a	—N/a	—N/a	Eliminated (Sing-Off Show 2)				
Willem Storms	—N/a	—N/a	Safe	—N/a	—N/a	Eliminated (Show 2)				
Astrid Wittevrongel	—N/a	—N/a	Safe	—N/a	Eliminated (Sing-Off)					
Thea Van Damme	Safe	—N/a	—N/a	—N/a	Eliminated (Sing-Off)					
Stefaan de Winter	—N/a	—N/a	—N/a	Eliminated (Battle 4)						
Kris Ratiau	—N/a	—N/a	Eliminated (Battle 3)							
Marie Schoovaerts	—N/a	—N/a	Eliminated (Battle 3)							
Teresa Orlando	—N/a	—N/a	Eliminated (Battle 3)							
Dimitri Verhoeven	—N/a	Eliminated (Battle 2)								
Kimberley Ceulemans	—N/a	Eliminated (Battle 2)								
Claudia Guarraci	Eliminated (Battle 1)									
Kenny Belcastro	Eliminated (Battle 1)									

==== Team Natalia ====
Candidate	Battle 1	Battle 2	Battle 3	Battle 4	Sing-Off	Show 2	Show 4	Show 5	Semi-Final	Final
Silke Mastbooms	Safe	—N/a	—N/a	—N/a	—N/a	Safe	Safe	Safe	Safe (135%)	2nd (48%)
Yass Smaali	—N/a	—N/a	Safe	—N/a	—N/a	Safe	Safe	Safe	Eliminated (65%)	
Ludovic Nyamabo	—N/a	—N/a	—N/a	Safe	—N/a	Safe	Safe	Eliminated (Show 5)		
Kris Struyven & Harry Hendrickx	—N/a	Safe	—N/a	—N/a	Safe	Safe	Eliminated (Show 4)			
Axelle Aerts	—N/a	Safe	—N/a	—N/a	—N/a	Eliminated (Sing-Off Show 2)				
Sarah Mulowayi	Safe	—N/a	—N/a	—N/a	—N/a	Eliminated (Show 2)				
Inge Van Gaver	—N/a	—N/a	Safe	—N/a	Eliminated (Sing-Off)					
Yvette Keijzers	—N/a	Safe	—N/a	—N/a	Eliminated (Sing-Off)					
Karen Melis	—N/a	—N/a	—N/a	Eliminated (Battle 4)						
Karim Lequenne	—N/a	—N/a	Eliminated (Battle 3)							
Nikita Wilms	—N/a	—N/a	Eliminated (Battle 3)							
Claudia Decaluwé	—N/a	Eliminated (Battle 2)								
Dimitri Jambé	—N/a	Eliminated (Battle 2)								
Kate Desot	—N/a	Eliminated (Battle 2)								
Willem Coppenolle & Bart Barends	Eliminated (Battle 1)									
Julia "Kristina" Hadian	Eliminated (Battle 1)									

=== Summary of competitors ===
Competitors' table
– Winner
– Runner-up
– Third
– Fourth
– Eliminated

Team	Acts					
Jasper Steverlinck	Charlotte Buyl	Wim Vandenberghe	De zusjes Vinken (female trio)	Mayken Hoessen	Maxine Eeckeloo	Glenn Claes
Natalia Druyts	Sarah Mulowayi	Axelle Aerts	Kris Struyven & Harry Hendrickx	Ludovic Nyamabo	Yass Smaali	Silke Mastbooms
Alex Callier	Willem Storms	Tanguy Van Dooren	Jodie Blommaert	Eveline Billiau	Joke Vincke	Iris Van Straten
Koen Wauters	Eley Van Hemelrijck	Els De Martelaere	Pristice Yoka Mpela	Dirk Cassiers	Stephanie Oclin	Bert Voordeckers

== Ratings ==
#	Stage	Original air date	Viewers	Placement	Source
1	Blind Auditions	November 25, 2011	700.231	15	
2	Blind Auditions	December 2, 2011	858.073	11	
3	Blind Auditions	December 9, 2011	934.479	10	
4	Blind Auditions	December 12, 2011	936.099	9	
5	Blind Auditions	December 23, 2011	997.379	8	
6	Blind Auditions	December 30, 2011	1.055.528	8	
7	Battles	January 6, 2012	975.337	8	
8	Battles	February 7, 2012	577.300	2	
9	Battles	January 13, 2012	921.091	11	
10	Battles	January 20, 2012	798.301	16	
11	Live Shows	January 27, 2012	897.141	11	
12	Live Shows	February 3, 2012	821.475	13	
13	Live Shows	February 10, 2012	765.622	17	
14	Live Shows	February 17, 2012	829.469	14	
15	Live Shows	February 24, 2012	749.187	TBA	
