= Songs of Innocence (Jasper Steverlinck album) =

Studio album by Jasper Steverlinck
- Released: 2004
- Label: PIAS

Songs of Innocence is the debut English-language solo album by the Belgian Flemish singer Jasper Steverlinck, frontman of Arid. It was released in 2004 by PIAS Recordings, and it topped for five weeks the Belgian Album Chart (Flanders Region), and reached No. 48 in the Wallonia Region. The album include the previous year's single "Life On Mars?", an acoustic cover of the Davie Bowie song with the Kolacny brothers pianists, which had spent seven weeks at No.1 in Belgium in 2003.

== Track list ==
1. "Sympathy" (3:39)
2. "Imaginary Love" (3:27)
3. "It Must Be Love" (3:40)
4. "Insensitive" (4:13)
5. "A Song for You" (4:54)
6. "We All Fall in Love Sometimes" (4:51)
7. "To Make You Feel My Love" (3:15)
8. "The River Knows" (3:25)
9. "Though You Are Far Away" (3:24)
10. "Life On Mars?" (4:02) (by David Bowie, arranged by Jasper Steverlinck with pianists Steven & Stijn Kolacny)
11. "Late Again" (3:05)

== Charts ==
=== Weekly charts ===
Chart (2004)	Peak position
Belgian Albums (Ultratop Flanders)	1
Belgian Albums (Ultratop Wallonia)	48

=== Year-end charts ===
Chart (2004)	Position
Belgian Albums (Ultratop Flanders)	14
