= Songs of Experience (disambiguation) =

Songs of Experience is an illustrated collection of poems by William Blake, second book of two in Songs of Innocence and Experience.

Songs of Experience may also refer to:

- Part 2 of Songs of Innocence and of Experience, musical setting of Blake's poems by William Bolcom
- Songs of Experience (David Axelrod album), 1969
- Songs of Experience (U2 album), 2017
- "Songs of Experience", an episode of the TV series Pretty Little Liars

== See also ==
- Songs of Innocence (disambiguation)
- Songs of Innocence and of Experience (disambiguation)
