= Rid of You =

Single by Natalia
- Released: 23 May 2006
- Recorded: 2006
- Genre: Poprock
- Length: 3'35
- Label: SonyBMG
- Songwriter(s): F. Stenberg, M. Starander, Z. Stamenkovic, C. Grönlund
- Producer(s): Steve Willaert

Natalia singles chronology
"Sisters Are Doin' It for Themselves" (2005)	"Rid of You" (2006)	"Gone to Stay" (2007)

"Rid of You" is the tenth single by Natalia which was released in 2006. The song was meant to be the first single of her third album, but a few weeks after she recorded this song her voice "crashed". As a result, the recordings of the new album couldn't take place and Rid of You couldn't get any promotion. The song still reached number 14 without any promotion or a music video.

== Charts ==
Chart (2007)	Peak position
Donna's Most Wanted	1
Ultratop 50	14
