= This Time (Natalia album) =

Studio album by Natalia
- Released: November 3, 2003 (Belgium)
- Recorded: 2003
- Genre: Pop
- Length: 50:12
- Label: Sony BMG
- Producer: Steve Willaert

Natalia chronology
| This Time (2003) | Back for More (2004) |

This Time is the first album of Natalia Druyts, a Belgian singer. It was released on 3 November 2003. Seven of the fourteen tracks are covers, the other seven are own songs. They did it because there wasn't enough time to make fourteen own songs. "Higher Than The Sun" (beginning "Your love's like a symphony..") was released as her third single. It peaked at number two in the charts.

In April 2004 a new version of the album was released, including the single Higher Than The Sun. Natalia performed this song on stage for the preselections of the Eurosong contest of Belgium. She ended up second, after Xandee.

In fall 2004 she received platinum for the sales of the album.

== Track listing ==
1. "Beautiful Now" – 3:38
2. "I've Only Begun to Fight" – 3:31
3. "Do You Wanna Funk" – 3:05
4. "Never Knew Love" – 4:18
5. "This Time" – 3:34
6. "For Once in My Life" – 4:43
7. "I Want You Back" – 4:06
8. "Never Never" – 3:23
9. "Orange Coloured Sky" – 2:31
10. "We're All Alone" – 3:59
11. "Too Late" – 3:15
12. "The Rose" – 3:33

=== Bonus tracks ===
13. "Without You" – 3:22
14. "Higher Than the Sun" – 2:53

== Charts ==
Albums in Belgian top 50
| Title | Release | HP | WC | Remarks |
| This Time | 03-11-2003 | 4 | 31 | Platinum |

== Singles ==
- "Without You" (2003-06-23) #2 (Gold)
- "I've Only Begun to Fight" (2003-10-20) #1 (Gold)
- "Higher Than the Sun" (2004-02-23) #2
- "I Want You Back" (2004-05-17) #3

== Beautiful Now ==
The song "Beautiful Now" was written for Anastacia. But instead of sending the song to her, the writers sent it to Natalia.
