= Hannes Löschel =

Austrian composer

Hannes Löschel (born 1963 in Vienna) is an Austrian composer of avant-garde electronic music.

Löschel began playing the piano when he was five years old. Following his music education at the Hochschule für Musik in Vienna, he initially performed contemporary music on stage. From c. 1990 onwards, he began developing works that spanned several styles as a composer, ensemble conductor and arranger. In 1995, he founded the Austrian trio Löschel Skrepek Zrost, with Paul Skrepek and Martin Zrost, who won the Hans Koller Preis for album of the year for their first CD While You Wait in 1997. He subsequently worked on a range of styles in formations including the electro-acoustic formation antasten together with Thomas Lehn and Josef Novotny, the free improvisation trio Kinds with David Tronzo as well as together with Phil Minton in 'Songs of Innocence', the song cycle he composed in 2008. Other formations co-founded or led by Löschel were, among others, the duo Chroma with Elisabeth Flunger, Phls Trio with Peter Herbert and Paul Skrepek, the Velvet Lounge, Kratky Baschik, Kinds of Orchestra, Hannes Löschel Stadtkapelle and weana korn. He has performed concerts and tour dates at numerous festivals and on many stages in Europe, North America, South America, Australia and Japan.

In 2000, he established the label loewenhertz with 21 productions of contemporary music to date.[1] In 2010 to 2011, he was Artist in Residence at Odeon in Vienna.[2]

As a composer, Löschel created works in the context of commissions for ORF, WDR, Bregenzer Festspiele, Musiktriennale Cologne, Wien modern, Diagonale, Wiener Volksliedwerk, Jeunesse, Jazzfestival Saalfelden, Glatt&Verkehrt, etc. Next to a number of CD productions and commissioned compositions, he realized productions for music and objects in cooperation with the artists Lisi Breuss and Silvia Beck, music for silent films, music for dance productions, stage music for puppet theatre as well as a vaudeville show in several parts (Das Unterösterreich) and a full-length opera (NEMESIS) for the sirene Operntheater in Vienna based on a text book by Kristine Tornquist.

== Compositions ==
- Messages, for small ensemble 1998
- Konferenz der Armseligkeit, for piano and tape 1999
- Memories of New Guinea, suite for string quartet, 1999
- Collage, string quartet, 2000
- Telenovela Largo, piano and tape, 2001
- Sang, for chamber ensemble and piano, 2004
- Spin, for chamber ensemble and piano, turntables and electronics 2006
- Flug, for chamber ensemble 2010
- Geflecht, for ensemble 2008
- Readymade IV, for piano and tape, 2010
- Nemesis, chamber opera, 2016

== Discography ==
- Songs of Innocence (Col Legno, 2010)
