= Arid (band) =

Belgian rock band

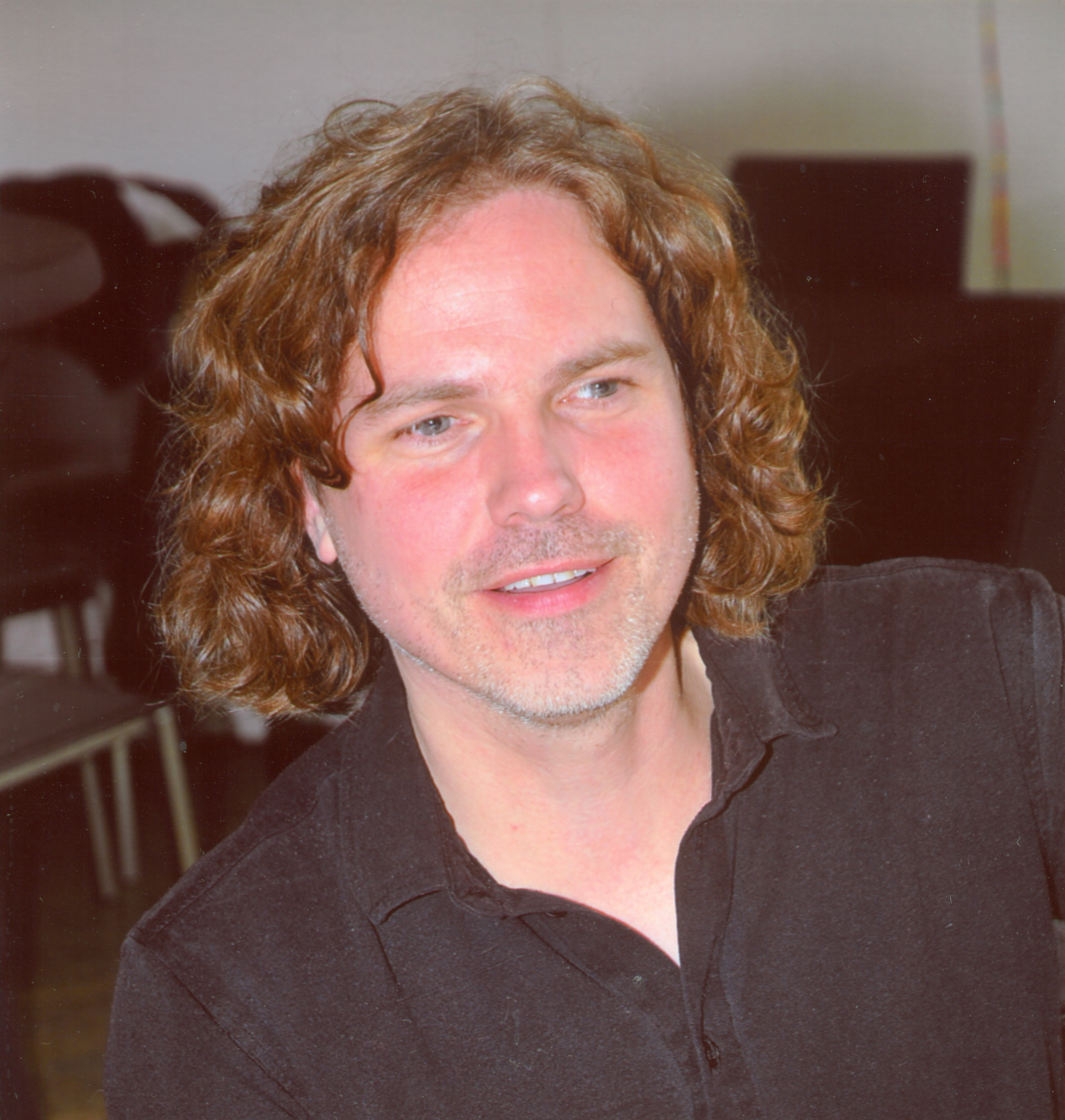
- Singer Jasper Steverlinck in 2017

Background information
- Origin: Belgium
- Genres: Alternative rock
- Years active: 1995–present
- Labels: Double T Sony Music Entertainment; PIAS Recordings
- Members: Jasper Steverlinck; David Du Pré; Filip Ros; Steven Van Havere
- Website: Arid's official website Jasper Steverlinck's official website

Arid is a Belgian rock band, formed in the mid-1990s, made up of four members: Jasper Steverlinck (vocals and guitar), David Du Pré (guitar), Filip Ros (bass) and Steven Van Havere (drums).

== History ==
The group first came to the attention of record label Double T when they were finalist at Humo's Rock Rally, a prestigious Belgian rock contest, in 1996.

Their first album was 1998's Little Things Of Venom (retitled At The Close Of Every Day for release in the United States). In 1999, after this album's success, they toured with Suede as well as opening for popular fellow Belgian band K's Choice. The following year they opened for Counting Crows on that band's European tour.

2001 brought extra fame for lead singer Steverlinck, who starred in the IMAX 3-D film Haunted Castle alongside Harry Shearer. The film also featured music by the band during the opening and closing credits.

In 2002 the band released a second studio album, All Is Quiet Now, which was soon followed by a live album (Live in 2003).

In 2008 their third studio album All Things Come in Waves was released.

In 2009 Steverlinck was chosen by Arjen Lucassen as lead singer for a side project called Guilt Machine.

2010 saw the release of their fourth studio album Under the Cold Street Lights.

== Influences ==
Steverlinck's voice, with its large vocal range, is comparable to that of Jeff Buckley or Freddie Mercury. On their official website, the band state their musical influences to include:

- Ben Harper
- Björk
- Boards Of Canada
- Fiona Apple
- Future Sound Of London
- Sigur Rós
- Pearl Jam
- Radiohead
- Aphex Twin
- Jeff Buckley
- Tool

They also state they are profoundly inspired by classical music and opera.

== Discography ==
=== Albums ===
- 1998 – Little Things Of Venom (released in the US in 2000 as At the Close of Every Day)
- 2002 – All Is Quiet Now
- 2003 – Live
- 2008 – All Things Come in Waves

- Track listing
1. "Right This Time" – 2:45
2. "When It's Over It's Over" – 3:54
3. "Words" – 3:46
4. "Why Do You Run" – 3:00
5. "Lost Stories (Run Away With You)" – 4:11
6. "If You Go" – 4:10
7. "Tied To The Hands That Hold You" – 3:13
8. "I Don't Know Where I'm Going" – 3:02
9. "I Hear Voices" – 3:28
10. "In Praise Of" – 3:17

- 2010 – Under the Cold Street Lights

Track-Listing
1. "The Flood" – 4:37
2. "Come On" – 3:28
3. "Something Brighter" – 3:39
4. "Seven Odd Years" – 3:14
5. "Mindless" – 4:11
6. "All That's Here Is All That's Left" – 4:40
7. "Custom Gold" – 3:57
8. "Broken Dancer" – 3:27
9. "Lock And Chain" – 4:35
10. "Cold Street Lights" – 3:55

=== Singles ===
- "Life" (1999)
- "Believer" (1999)
- "Too Late Tonight" (1999)
- "Me And My Melody" (2000)
- "All Will Wait" (2000)
- "You Are" (2002)
- "Everlasting Change" (2002)
- "Life On Mars" (2002)
- "Let Her Down Easy" (2003)
- "Words" (2007)
- "Why Do You Run" (2007)
- "Come On" (2010)
- "Broken Dancer" (2010)
- "The High Life" (2011)
- "Seven Odd Years" (2012)
