= Wise Girl (album) =

Studio album by Natalia
- Released: 2009
- Recorded: 2008
- Genre: pop

Natalia chronology
Everything & More (2007)	Wise Girl (2009)

Wise Girl is the fourth studio album by Belgian singer Natalia. The digital release was scheduled for April 17, 2009 and the store version was launched one week later.

The album was recorded largely in December 2008 in Canterbury, England. In January 2009 All Or Nothing, the first single, was released from the album. In February 2009, the album was mixed in Toronto, Canada.

In 2009, there was a summer tour to promote the album.

== Tracks ==
1. All or Nothing (04:11)
2. Heartbreaker (Kit Hain, Stefaan Fernandez) (03:26)
3. Cat That Got the Cream (03:18)
4. Wise Girl (04:21)
5. Lonely (03:16)
6. 17 Days (02:50)
7. Put That Record On (02:48)
8. Suspicion (03:35)
9. Match Made in Heaven (04:11)
10. On the Radio (03:48)
11. Treat Me Like a Woman Today (03:17)
12. Still with Me (04:29)

Exclusive bonustrack iTunes
13. Soul Divided (03:25)

Exclusive bonustrack Free Record Shop
13. Feeling (03:08)

Exclusive bonustracks Special Edition
13. Feeling (03:08)
14. Soul Divided (03:25)
15. Mind, Body & Soul (03:28)

== Chart performance ==
Chart (2009)	Peak position
Belgian Albums (Ultratop Flanders)	1

== Certifications ==
In 2009, Wise Girl was certified gold in Belgium.
