= Back for More Live =

Back For More Live

Video by Natalia
- Released: February 14, 2005
- Genre: Pop
- Length: 120:00
- Label: Sony BMG
- Director: Hans Pannecoucke
- Producer: Zuiderkroon Events, VMMa, Koen Hendrickx & Marc Leemans

Natalia chronology
Back For More Live (2005)	Natalia meets En Vogue feat. Shaggy (2008)

Back For More Live is the first concert DVD by Natalia, and documents one of the 40 shows she did in Belgium. The show was recorded in "De Zuiderkroon", Antwerp and was released on 14 February 2005. It was the best-selling DVD for 15 weeks and the most-sold DVD of 2005.

== Track listing ==
1. Unspeakable
2. Back For More
3. This Time
4. Alright, Okay, You Win
5. Hanky Panky (by Madonna)
6. You Are (by Dolly Parton)
7. Some Things Are Meant To Be
8. Get Back
9. Never Never
10. Higher Than The Sun
11. We're Gonna Have A Party
12. I've Only Begun To Fight
13. Queen of the Night (by Whitney Houston)
14. Fragile, Not Broken
15. What Don't Kill You Makes You Stronger
16. Shelter
17. I Want You Back
18. Elvis medley (Heartbreak Hotel, Jailhouse Rock, A Big Hunk o' Love, Hound Dog & Trouble)
19. Ridin' By
20. Love Shack
21. Risin'
22. Think (by Aretha Franklin)
23. You're Gonna Get There
24. Tina medley (Simply the Best, Steamy Windows, Nutbush City Limits & River Deep Mountain High)

Extra:

- Behind the scenes (live recording & CD recording)
- Videoclips (I've Only Begun To Fight, Risin' & Fragile, Not Broken)

°This song became so popular with the audience that it was released as a B-side of Natalia's single "Ridin' By".

== Charts ==
Chart (2005)	Peak position
Belgian music-DVD chart	1

== Musicians ==
- Wietse Meys: Musical director & sax
- Jeroen Van Melderen: Trumpet & keyboard
- Martijn De Laat: Trumpet
- Lode Mertens: Trombone
- Steven Cornillie: Piano & keyboards
- Kurt Lelièvre: Drums
- Guy Remmerie: Percussion
- Marc Cortens: Guitar
- Marc Van Puyenbroeck: Bass
- Helena Fontuyn: Backing vocals
- Wen Bellens: Backing vocals
- Liv Van Aelst: Backing vocals
- Vivica Turrentine: Backing vocals

== Dancers ==
- Kris Castelijns
- Oscar Millan
- Christian Celini
- Sarah Rafrari
- Charissa Soentpiet
- Natasha Debels
