= Gone to Stay =

2007 single by Belgian singer Natalia

Single by Natalia

from the album Everything and More
- Released: 19 May 2007
- Recorded: 2007
- Genre: Pop
- Length: 3'40
- Label: SonyBMG
- Songwriter(s): Herbert Crichlow, Ari Erik Lehtonen, Per Stappe
- Producer(s): Brix

Natalia singles chronology
"Rid of You" (2006)	"Gone to Stay" (2007)	"Glamorous" (2007)

"Gone To Stay" is a single by Natalia. It is the lead single of her third studio album, Everything and More. It was released in Belgium 19 May 2007. The song is recorded in Berlin, together with the other tracks of the album.

== Charts ==
Chart (2007)	Peak position
Donna's Most Wanted	1
Belgian Download top 10	1
Ultratop 50	9

== Music video ==
There was no music video for Gone To Stay. Natalia's manager Bob Savenberg: "It is summer, so there aren't many people that watch television. There will be a video of the next single, which will be released internationally as well."

== Awards ==
Natalia received the award for Best Song Of The Summer from radiostation "Radio 2". It's the first time she wins the award and she wins from Belle Perez, who won the award for 5 years.

The song was also nominated for Best Song Of The Summer on Tien Om Te Zien on the TV channel VTM. But she didn't win.

== Lyrics ==
The song handles a couple that is breaking up after a lot of troubles. But Natalia sings she'll be just fine without him. "I don't care and I don't mind, if you gonna find somebody else, boy that's alright".
