= Just Because of You =

Single by US5

from the album Here We Go
- Released: 14 October 2005
- Length: 3:34
- Label: Triple M; Global; Universal
- Songwriter(s): Dashiel Andrews; MM Dollar; Mike Michaels; Sammy Naja; TK-Roxx
- Producer(s): Mark Dollar; Mike Michaels; Sammy Naja

US5 singles chronology
"Maria" (2005)	"Just Because of You" (2005)	"Come Back to Me Baby" (2006)

"Just Because of You" is a song by German–American boy band US5. It was written by Dashiel Andrews, MM Dollar, Mike Michaels, Sammy Naja, and Jay "TK-Roxx" Khan for their debut studio album Here We Go (2005), while production was helmed by Dollar, Michaels, and Naja. The song reached the top 5 in Austria and Germany.

== Track listings ==
CD single
No.	Title	Writer(s)	Producer(s)	Length
1.	"Just Because of You" (Single Edit)	Dashiel Andrews; MM Dollar; Mike Michaels; Sammy Naja; TK-Roxx	Dollar; Michaels; Naja	3:34
2.	"Just Because of You" (Fullvocal House Remix)	Andrews; Dollar; Michaels; Naja; TK-Roxx	Dollar; Michaels; Naja; DJ Felyx Lighter^{[a]}; Antoine Montana^{[a]}	3:59
3.	"Just Because of You" (Video Cut – Incl. Dance-Break)	Andrews; Dollar; Michaels; Naja; TK-Roxx	Dollar; Michaels; Naja; Ivan Gogh^{[a]}	3:49
4.	"Just Because of You" (D&G Remix)	Andrews; Dollar; Michaels; Naja; TK-Roxx	Dollar; Michaels; Naja; Bo Diggler^{[a]}	4:48
5.	"Just Because of You" (Instrumental)	Andrews; Dollar; Michaels; Naja; TK-Roxx	Dollar; Michaels; Naja	3:33
6.	"Just Because of You" (Special Video Bonus Material)	Andrews; Dollar; Michaels; Naja; TK-Roxx	Dollar; Michaels; Naja	3:33

Notes

- ^{^a} denotes additional producer

== Charts ==
=== Weekly charts ===
Chart (2005–06)	Peak position
Austria (Ö3 Austria Top 40)	3
Germany (GfK)	3
Switzerland (Schweizer Hitparade)	8

=== Year-end charts ===
Chart (2005)	Position
Austria (Ö3 Austria Top 40)	51
Germany (Media Control GfK)	67
Switzerland (Schweizer Hitparade)	89
