= Back for More (Natalia album) =

Studio album by Natalia
- Released: August 30, 2004 (Belgium)
- Recorded: 2004
- Genre: Pop
- Length: 1:02:14
- Label: Sonybmg
- Producer: Steve Willaert

Natalia chronology
| This Time (2003) | Back for More (2004) | Everything and More (2007) |

Back for More is the second album by Natalia, a Belgian singer. It was released in Belgium 30 August 2004.

The album reached #1 in Belgium charts immediately. In October 2005 she received a TMF-award for Best Album national. In January 2006 after the first show of Natalia meets The Pointer Sisters she received 2× platinum for the sales of her album.

In June 2006, Back For More was re-released and included two bonus tracks: You Are & Heart Of Gold.

== Track listing ==
1. "Fragile Not Broken" – 2:53
2. "Risin'" – 4:05
3. "Every Single Day" – 3:12
4. "Ridin' By" – 4:04
5. "Unspeakable" – 3:15
6. "Some Things Are Meant to Be" – 3:11
7. "You're Gonna Get There" – 3:19
8. "We're Gonna Have a Party" – 3:51
9. "Get Back" – 3:20
10. "Alright, Okay, You Win" – 2:38
11. "Back for More" – 3:34
12. "What Don't Kill You Makes You Stronger" – 3:48
13. "Shelter" – 4:01

=== @ the club ===
14. "Feels So Good" – 4:11
15. "Risin' (remix)" – 3:50

=== Bonus tracks (new version) ===
16. You Are 5:08
17. "Heart Of Gold 3:41

== Charts ==
Albums in Belgium's top 50
| Title | Release | HP | WC | Remarks |
| Back For More | 30-08-2004 | 1 | 39 | 2× platinum |

== Singles ==
- Risin' (9 August 2004) #2
- Fragile, Not Broken (29 November 2004) #11
- Shelter (28 February 2005) #28
- Ridin' By/You Are (30 May 2005) #12

== Tour ==
Back For More live sold out over more than 90 times in Belgium. In February 2005 she released her first live-DVD: Back For More live. For 15 weeks, the DVD was the best-sold music-DVD of Belgium and it was the best-sold DVD of 2005.

=== DVD Track listing ===
1. "Unspeakable"
2. "Back for More"
3. "This Time"
4. "Alright, Okay, You Win"
5. "Hanky Panky" (by Madonna)
6. "You Are"° (by Dolly Parton)
7. "Some Things Are Meant to Be"
8. "Get Back"
9. "Never Never"
10. "Higher Than the Sun"
11. "We're Gonna Have a Party"
12. "I've Only Begun to Fight"
13. "Queen of the Night" (by Whitney Houston)
14. "Fragile, Not Broken"
15. "What Don't Kill You Makes You Stronger"
16. "Shelter"
17. "I Want You Back"
18. "Elvis medley" (Heartbreak Hotel", "Jailhouse Rock", "Big Hunk o' Love", "Hound Dog" & "Trouble")
19. "Ridin' By"
20. "Love Shack" (by B-52's)
21. "Risin'"
22. "Think"
23. "You're Gonna Get There"
24. "Tina medley" ("The Best", "Steamy Windows", "Nutbush City Limits" & "River Deep - Mountain High")

Extra:

- Behind the scenes (live recording & CD recording)
- Videoclip ("I've Only Begun to Fight", "Risin'" & "Fragile, Not Broken")

°This song became so popular with the audience that it was released as a B-side of "Ridin' By". In June 2006, it was also released as a bonus track on the re-release of Back For More.
