= Natalia (Belgian singer) =

Belgian singer (born 1980)

Natalia Druyts
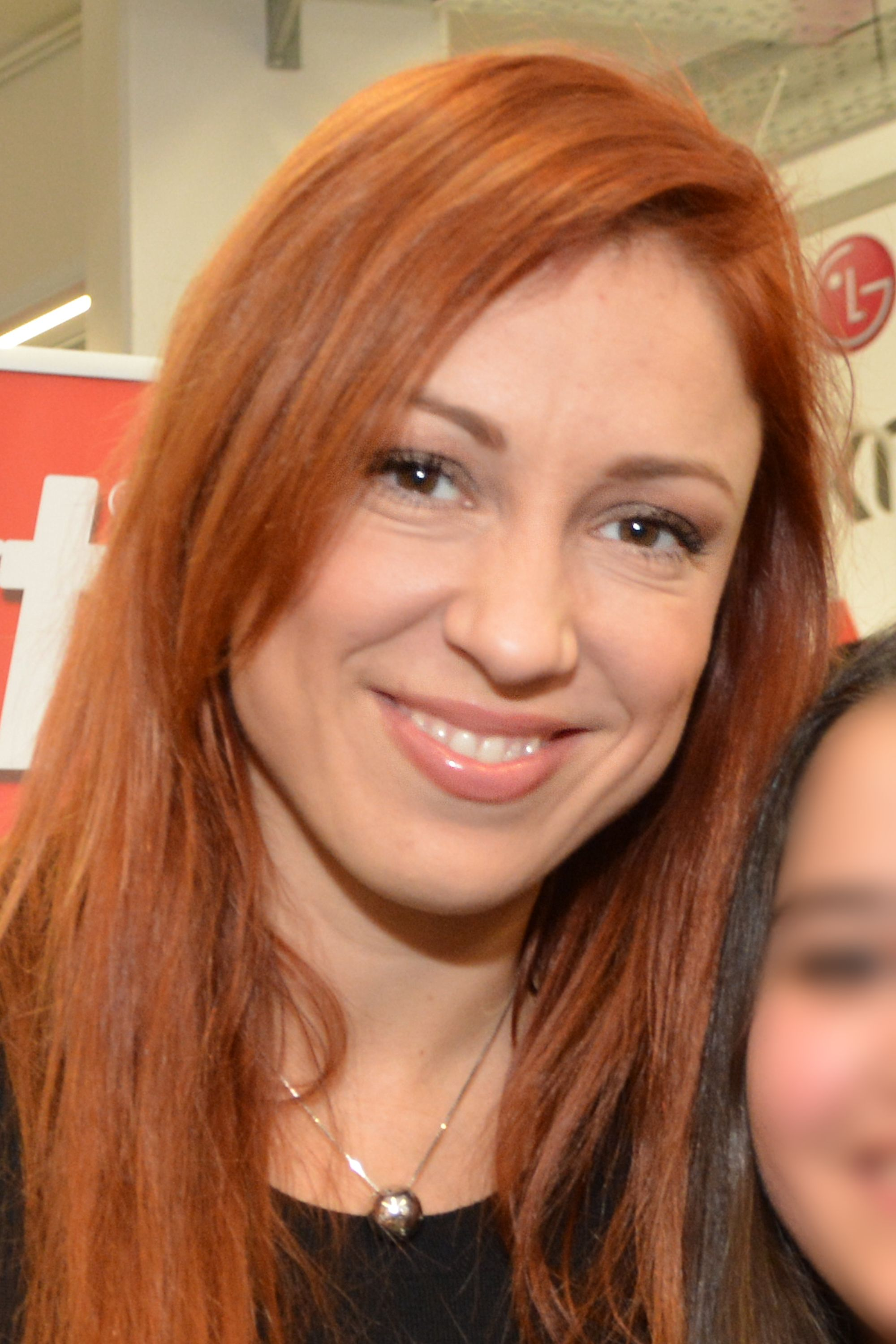

Background information
- Also known as: Natalia
- Born: Natalia Willy Druyts; 3 December 1980 (age 45); Geel, Antwerp, Belgium
- Genres: R&B, pop, rock
- Occupation: Singer
- Years active: 2003–present
- Labels: Sony Music Belgium, Universal
- Website: natalia.be

Natalia Willy Druyts (born 3 December 1980), known mononymously as Natalia, is a Belgian singer. She became known in Flanders during the VTM program Idool 2003, in which she finished in second place. She has also served a coach in Flemish TV-programs The Voice van Vlaanderen, The Voice Kids and The Voice Senior.

== Early life and career ==
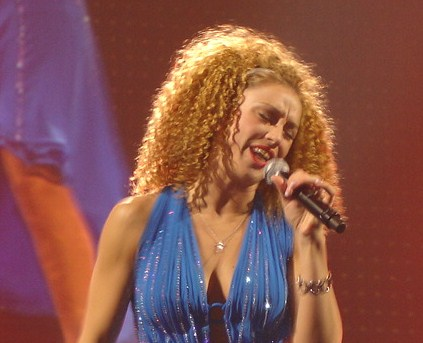
Natalia performing in 2008

Natalia was born on 3 December 1980 in Geel, Belgium. Her parents had always lived in Oevel, a village close by the Geel municipality. She graduated as a translator in English and Spanish.

Before 2003 Natalia was the singer of a small music group in Gierle (Belgium). This group was only known in the area of Turnhout (Belgium) and Westerlo (Belgium), where they had some performances. She got her breakthrough in 2003, which unfortunately meant she had to break up with her friends from 'Secret Me'.

In 2003 Natalia released her first single "Without You", the single peaked at number two in the Belgian charts and was certified gold in Belgium. Not much later, Natalia provided two songs for the Belgian movie Team Spirit II, releasing "I've Only Begun To Fight" as her second single and as part of the soundtrack for the movie. The song peaked at number one in the Belgian charts and was certified gold in Belgium. Shortly after, she recorded her first album, This Time. It was certified platinum in Belgium, and Natalia started her first tour, the This Time Live Tour. Originally planned as a 20 date tour, it was extended to 90 dates due to massive ticket demands. While on tour she performed at the pre-selections for the Eurovision Song Contest with "Higher Than The Sun", which was released as her third single. It peaked at number two in the Belgian charts. The fourth and last single of the This Time album was "I Want You Back", which peaked at number three in the charts.

In October 2005, Natalia released a single together with The Pointer Sisters, "Sisters Are Doin' It for Themselves", which reached number two in the Belgian charts. She performed 10 concerts with The Pointer Sisters in January 2006 during Natalia Meets The Pointer Sisters in the Sportpaleis, Antwerp, attended by more than 130,000 people.

Natalia released a single together with En Vogue called "Glamorous" in October 2007; it reached number two on the Belgian charts. In January 2008 she performed with En Vogue and Shaggy during Natalia Meets En Vogue, Feat Shaggy at the Sportpaleis in Antwerp.

In January 2011, Natalia planned a new concert series with an international superstar, this time she chose Anastacia. They recorded a single called "Burning Star", and in January 2011 toured as Natalia Meets Anastacia, selling over 75,000 tickets. In January 2014, Natalia was on the screen as a presenter for the first time. Together with Sam De Bruyn, she presented the Music Industry Awards on Eén. In the autumn of 2015 Natalia was a coach in the program The Voice Kids. A candidate from Natalia's team, Mentissa, eventually won the program. In 2015 she continued with her role as a coach in The Voice Kids. On 14 February 2015, Natalia was a guest at the Ladies of Soul in the Netherlands, singing the song Lady Marmalade. In August 2015, she presented her new single "Smoking Gun" during the Pop Up Live program on Eén.

== Discography ==
=== Studio albums ===
Year	Title	Chart positions	Certifications
Year	Title	BEL	Certifications
2003	This Time: 1st studio album; Released: 3 November 2003; Formats: CD, digital download; Versions: original version, New Version; (including "Higher Than The Sun"): Genre: Pop; Label: Sony BMG	4	Belgium: 2× Platinum
2004	Back For More: 2nd studio album; Released: 30 August 2004; Formats: CD, digital download; Versions: original version, New Version; (including "You Are" and "Heart Of Gold"): Genre: Pop; Label: Sony BMG	1	Belgium: 3× Platinum
2007	Everything and More: 3rd studio album; Released: 28 May 2007; Formats: CD, digital download; Versions: original version, New Version; (including "Drop A Little (Single Version)", "All That I Am", "Where She Belongs"): Genre: Pop; Label: Sony BMG	1	Belgium: 2× Platinum
2009	Wise Girl: 4th studio album; Released: 17 April 2009; Formats: CD, digital download; Versions: original version, New Version; (including "Feeling", "Soul Divided", "Mind, Body and Soul"): Genre: Pop; Label: Sony BMG	1	Belgium: Platinum
2010	Acoustelicious: 1st live album; Released: 16 February 2010; Formats: CD; Genre: Pop; Label: Sony BMG	1	Belgium: Platinum
2013	Overdrive: 5th studio album; Released: 26 April 2013; Formats: CD, digital download; Genre: Pop, Dance; Label: Universal Music Belgium	2	Belgium: Platinum
2016	In My Blood: 6th studio album; Released: 29 April 2016; Formats: CD, digital download; Genre: Pop, soul; Label: Natalia Music	2	Belgium: Platinum
2017	The Sound of Me: 7th studio album; Released: 9 June 2017; Formats: CD, digital download; Label: Natalia Music	3	Belgium: Gold
2023	Hallelujah to the Beat: 8th studio album; Released: 21 April 2023; Formats: CD, digital download; Label: Sony	2	

=== Singles ===
Title	Year	Peak chart positions	Album
Title	Year	BEL	Album
"Without You"	2003	2	This Time
"I've Only Begun to Fight"	2003	1	This Time
"Higher Than the Sun"	2004	2	This Time
"I Want You Back"	2004	3	This Time
"Risin'"	2004	2	Back For More
"Fragile, Not Broken"	2004	11	Back For More
"Shelter"	2005	28	Back For More
"Ridin' By/You Are"	2005	12	Back For More
"Sisters Are Doin' It for Themselves" (with The Pointer Sisters)	2005	2	Non-album singles
"Rid of You"	2006	14	Non-album singles
"Gone to Stay"	2007	9	Everything & More
"Glamorous/Where She Belongs" (with En Vogue)	2007	2	Everything & More
"I Survived You"^{[A]}	2008	26	Everything & More
"Drop a Little"	2008	7	Everything & More
"All or Nothing"	2008	13	Wise Girl
"Heartbreaker"^{[A]}	2009	48	Wise Girl
"Feeling"	2009	36	Wise Girl
"Still with Me"^{[A]}	2009	63	Wise Girl
"Hallelujah" (with Gabriel Rios)	2010	1	Non-album single
"On the Radio"	2010	—	Wise Girl
"Burning Star" (with Anastacia)	2010	45	Non-album singles
"1 Minute"	2011	58	Non-album singles
"Angel" (Lionel Richie featuring Natalia)	2012	32	Non-album singles
"Overdrive"	2013	19	Overdrive
"Boom"	2013	10	Overdrive
"A Girl Like Me"	2013	52	Overdrive
"Ride Like the Wind/Cavalgaré"	2014	55	Overdrive
"Downtown" (with Paul Michiels)	2014	41	"A Singer's Heart" (Paul Michiels)
"Smoking gun"	2015	13	In My Blood
"You Are So Beautiful"	2015	9	Non-album single
"In My Blood"	2016	16	In My Blood
"Razorblade" (with Lara Fabian)	2016	—^{[B]}	In My Blood
"Anyone Out There"	2016	—^{[C]}	In My Blood
"Synchronize"	2016	—^{[D]}	The Sound of Me
"You've Got a Friend" (live)	2017	9	The Sound of Me
"How I Danced" (live)	2017	31	The Sound of Me
"Conqueror"	2017	—^{[E]}	The Sound of Me
"Hear That Sound"	2018	—^{[F]}	Non-album single
"When You Came By"	2023	—	Hallelujah to the Beat
"Ready for the Ride"	2023	23	Hallelujah to the Beat
"—" denotes a recording that did not chart or was not released in that territory.

Notes A. "I Survived You", "Heartbreaker" and "Still with Me" were only released digitally.
B. "Razorblade" did not enter the Flemish Ultratop 50, but peaked at number 5 on the Ultratip chart.
C. "Anyone Out There" did not enter the Flemish Ultratop 50, but peaked at number 15 on the Ultratip chart.
D. "Synchronize" did not enter the Flemish Ultratop 50, but peaked at number 12 on the Ultratip chart.
E. "Conqueror" did not enter the Flemish Ultratop 50, but peaked at number 16 on the Ultratip chart.
F. "Hear That Sound" did not enter the Flemish Ultratop 50, but peaked at number 2 on the Ultratip chart.

=== DVDs ===
- Back For More live (2005) (#1)
- Natalia Meets En Vogue feat. Shaggy (2008)
- Natalia Live in Hasselt – 10 Year Anniversary Concert (2013)

== Awards ==
Year	Award-Show	Award	Result
2003	TMF Awards	Best New Artist National	Nominated
2003	Tien Om Te Zien summer (vtm)	Best song ("Without You")	Won
2003	Tien Om Te Zien winter (vtm)	Best song ("I've Only Begun To Fight")	Won
2003	Jommeke's Newspaper	Best Female Singer	Won
2004	Tien Om Te Zien summer (vtm)	Best Song ("I Want You Back")	Nominated
2004	Tien Om Te Zien summer (vtm)	Best Song ("Risin'")	Won
2004	ZAMU Music Awards	Most Popular	Won
2004	TMF Awards	Best Female Artist National	Won
2004	TMF Awards	Best Pop Natinonal	Won
2004	Jommeke's Newspaper	Best Female Singer	Won
2004	één	Best Song of the year ("Risin'")	Won
2004	Online Men Magazine "Feliks"	Most Desirable Woman of Belgium	Nominated
2005	Tien Om Te Zien summer	Best Song ("You Are")	Nominated
2005	TMF Awards	Best Female Artist National	Nominated
2005	TMF Awards	Best Pop National	Won
2005	TMF Awards	Best Album National ("Back For More")	Won
2005	Online Men Magazine "Feliks"	Most Desirable Woman of Belgium	Won
2005	Kids Awards	Chick of the Year	Won
2006	ZAMU Music Awards	Best Live Act	Nominated
2006	TMF Awards	Best Female Artist National	Won
2006	TMF Awards	Best Pop National	Nominated
2006	Radio 2	Best Concert ("Natalia meets The Pointer Sisters")	Won
2007	Radio 2	Best Summer Song ("Gone To Stay")	Won
2007	Radio 2	Best Performance	Nominated
2007	Tien Om Te Zien summer	Best Song ("Gone To Stay")	Nominated
2007	TMF Awards	Best Pop National	Nominated
2007	TMF Awards	Best Album National (Everything & More)	Nominated
2007	TMF Awards	Best Female Artist National	Won
2007	TMF Awards	Best Live National	Nominated
2007	Golden Flip Award	Best Female Singer	Won'
2007	Showbizz-Site of 2007	Best website https://www.nataliamusic.be	Won
2008	Music Industry Awards	Best Live act	Nominated
2008	Music Industry Awards	Best Solo Artist	Won
2008	Music Industry Awards	Best Pop	Nominated
2008	Music Industry Awards	Best Song (Gone to Stay)	Nominated
2008	Kids Awards	Music of the Year	Nominated
2008	Kids Awards	Chick of the Year	Nominated
2008	TMF Awards	Best Female Artist	Won
2008	TMF Awards	Best Live Act	Nominated
2008	TMF Awards	Best Pop Act	Won
2008	Radio 2	Best Song (I Survived You & Drop a Little)	Nominated
2008	Radio 2	Best Performance (Natalia meets En Vogue ft. Shaggy)	Nominated
2008	Radio 2	Best Video Clip (I Survived You)	Nominated
2009	Radio 2	Best Performance (Glamorous Arena Tour)	Won
2009	Radio 2	Best Song (All Or Nothing, Heartbreaker)	Nominated
2009	TMF Awards	Best Album (Wise Girl)	Nominated
2009	TMF Awards	Best Live Act	Nominated
2009	TMF Awards	Best Female	Won
2009	TMF Awards	Best Pop	Nominated
2009	Music Industry Awards	Best Pop	Nominated
2009	Music Industry Award	Best Female solo	Nominated
2009	Music Industry Award	Best Song (All Or Nothing)	Nominated
2014	Music Industry Award	Best Female solo	Nominated
2014	Music Industry Award	Best Pop	Nominated

== Autobiography ==
Met Hart En Soul (English: With Heart and Soul) was written by Natalia and a ghost-writer. It is about her early life and career. The book was released on 8 October 2007.
