= Here We Go (US5 album) =

Studio album by US5
- Released: 18 November 2005
- Length: 47:01
- Label: Triple M; Global; Universal
- Producer: Mark Dollar; Mike Michaels; Sammy Naja

US5 chronology
Here We Go (2005)	In Control (2006)

Singles from Here We Go
- 1. "Maria" Released: 26 June 2005; 2. "Just Because of You" Released: 14 October 2005; 3. "Come Back to Me Baby" Released: 10 February 2006; 4. "Mama" Released: 6 May 2006

Here We Go is the debut studio album by German-based boy group US5. It was released by Triple M Music, Global Music, and Universal Music on 18 November 2005 in German-speaking Europe. The album was in three formats: normal, limited edition (both released in November 2005) and new edition released in March 2006. Here We Go was certified 3× gold for sales of over 300,000 copies.

== Promotion ==
The promotion of Here We Go was supported by the release of several singles. The lead single, "Maria," became the album's most successful release and served as the main promotional track. It reached number one on the German Singles Chart, number 4 in Austria, number 5 in Poland, number 8 in Switzerland, and number 38 in the United Kingdom. The single also achieved Gold certification in Germany and the United States. Follow-up "Just Because of You" continued the album's momentum, reaching number 3 in both Germany and Austria, and number 8 in Switzerland. In 2006, Here We Go was reissued as Here We Go – New Edition, accompanied by new promotional singles. "Come Back to Me Baby" achieved strong chart results, reaching number 3 in Germany, number 4 in Austria, and number 4 in Switzerland. The final single, "Mama," also charted across Europe, reaching number 4 in Germany, and number 6 in Austria.

== Commercial performance ==
Here We Go achieved strong commercial success following its release in 2005, particularly in German-speaking European markets. The album performed well on the major national album charts, reaching number 7 on the Austrian Albums Chart, number 5 on the German Albums Chart, and number 23 on the Swiss Albums Chart. It also charted in Japan, where it reached number 248 on the Oricon Albums Chart. The album's strongest market was Germany, where it received a 3× Gold certification from the Bundesverband Musikindustrie (BVMI), representing 300,000 certified shipments. In Austria, Here We Go was certified Gold by IFPI Austria for sales of 15,000 units.

== Track listing ==
All tracks produced by Mike Michaels, Sammy Naja, and Mark Dollar.

Here We Go track listing
No.	Title	Writer(s)	Length
1.	"Last to Know"	Mike Michaels; Mark Dollar; Sammy Naja; TK-Roxx; Dashiel Andrews	4:17
2.	"Just Because of You" (Single Edit)	Michaels; Dollar; Naja; TK-Roxx; Andrews	3:34
3.	"Here We Go"	Obi Mhondera; Lars H. Jensen; Johannes R. Joergensen; Derek McDonald	3:14
4.	"Jesus"	Michaels; Dollar; Naja; TK-Roxx; Andrews; Ivan "Jazalou" Georgiev	3:48
5.	"Señorita"	Michaels; Dollar; Naja; TK-Roxx; Andrews	3:24
6.	"Maria" (Single Edit)	Michaels; Dollar; Naja; TK-Roxx; Andrews	3:42
7.	"I Can't Sleep"	Michaels; Dollar; Naja; TK-Roxx; Andrews; Jazalou; Lockefella	4:05
8.	"Spell on Me"	Michaels; Dollar; Naja; TK-Roxx	3:48
9.	"Your Love"	Michaels; Dollar; Naja; TK-Roxx; Andrews	4:33
10.	"The Day You Cried"	Michaels; Dollar; Naja; TK-Roxx; Andrews	3:53
11.	"Let It Go"	Michaels; Dollar; Naja; TK-Roxx; Jazalou	3:19
12.	"Say La, La, La, La"	Michaels; Dollar; Naja; TK-Roxx; Andrews	4:15
13.	"One of Us"	Benny Andersson; Björn Ulvaeus	3:49

New edition – bonus tracks
No.	Title	Writer(s)	Length
14.	"Come Back to Me Baby" (Single Edit)	Michaels; Dollar; Naja; TK-Roxx	3:53
15.	"Best Friends" (Special song for Richie)	Michaels; Dollar; Naja; TK-Roxx	4:28
16.	"Mama"	Michaels; Dollar; Naja; TK-Roxx	3:24
17.	"The Day You Cried" (Ivan Gogh Remix)	Michaels; Dollar; Naja; TK-Roxx; Andrews	3:31
18.	"Come Back to Me Baby" (Live Version)	Michaels; Dollar; Naja; TK-Roxx	3:41

== Charts ==
=== Weekly charts ===
Weekly chart performance for Here We Go
Chart (2005)	Peak position
Austrian Albums (Ö3 Austria)	7
German Albums (Offizielle Top 100)	5
Japanese Albums (Oricon)	248
Swiss Albums (Schweizer Hitparade)	23

=== Year-end charts ===
Year-end chart performance for Here We Go
Chart (2006)	Position
Austrian Albums (Ö3 Austria)	51
German Albums (Offizielle Top 100)	19

== Sales and certifications ==
Certifications for Here We Go
Region	Certification	Certified units/sales
Austria (IFPI Austria)	Gold	15,000^{*}
Germany (BVMI)	3× Gold	300,000^{^}
^{*} Sales figures based on certification alone.^{^} Shipments figures based on certification alone.
