= Maria (US5 song) =

Single by US5

from the album Here We Go
- Released: 26 June 2005
- Length: 3:42
- Label: Triple M; Global; Universal
- Songwriter(s): Dashiel Andrews; Mark "MM" Dollar; Mike Michaels; Sammy Naja; TK-Roxx
- Producer(s): Mark "MM" Dollar; Mike Michaels; Sammy Naja

US5 singles chronology
"Maria" (2005)	"Just Because of You" (2005)

"Maria" is the debut single of German-American boy band US5. It was written by Dashiel Andrews, Mark "MM" Dollar, Mike Michaels, Sammy Naja, and Jay "TK-Roxx" Khan for their debut studio album Here We Go (2005), while production was helmed by Dollar, Michaels, and Naja. The song peaked at number one on the German Singles Chart and charted within the top 10 in Austria and Switzerland. "Maria" also entered the top 40 of the UK Singles Chart, reaching number 38.

== Music video ==
A music video for "Maria" was directed by Oliver Sommer and produced by AVA Studios GmbH. Filmed in May and June 2005 at Universal Studios in Florida, it shows the band dancing with the girls along with their manager Lou Pearlman.

== Track listing ==
CD single
No.	Title	Writer(s)	Producer(s)	Length
1.	"Maria" (single edit)	Dashiel Andrews; MM Dollar; Mike Michaels; Sammy Naja; TK-Roxx	Dollar; Michaels; Naja	3:42
2.	"Maria" (remix)	Andrews; Dollar; Michaels; Naja; TK-Roxx	Dollar; Michaels; Naja	3:34
3.	"Maria" (video cut – incl. dance break)	Andrews; Dollar; Michaels; Naja; TK-Roxx	Dollar; Michaels; Naja	4:01
4.	"Maria" (Amore remix)	Andrews; Dollar; Michaels; Naja; TK-Roxx	Dollar; Michaels; Naja	3:07
5.	"Maria" (instrumental)	Andrews; Dollar; Michaels; Naja; TK-Roxx	Dollar; Michaels; Naja	3:42

== Credits and personnel ==
- Dashiel Andrews – songwriter
- Mike Delancett – assistant engineer
- Mark "MM" Dollar – producer, songwriter
- Doug Johnson – assistant engineer
- Mike Michaels – producer, songwriter
- Sammy Naja – producer, songwriter
- TK-Roxx – songwriter
- Lou Pearlman – executive producer
- Eric Schilling – mixing assistance
- Michael Skora – recording engineer (vocals)
- Kyle Weeks – recording engineer (vocals)

== Charts ==
=== Weekly charts ===
Weekly chart performance for "Maria"
Chart (2005)	Peak position
Austria (Ö3 Austria Top 40)	4
Europe (Eurochart Hot 100)	8
Germany (GfK)	1
Switzerland (Schweizer Hitparade)	8
UK Singles (OCC)	38

=== Year-end charts ===
Year-end chart performance for "Maria"
Chart (2005)	Position
Austria (Ö3 Austria Top 40)	34
Europe (Eurochart Hot 100)	80
Germany (Media Control GfK)	23
Switzerland (Schweizer Hitparade)	65

== Certifications ==
Certifications for "Maria"
Region	Certification	Certified units/sales
United States (RIAA)	Gold	500,000^{^}
^{^} Shipments figures based on certification alone.
