= Jasper Steverlinck =

Belgian singer and guitarist

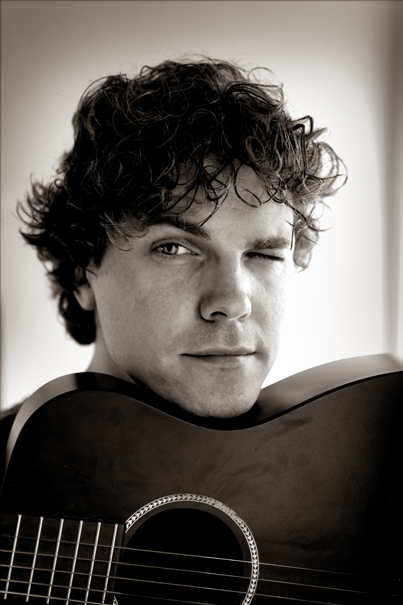

Background information
- Born: 30 April 1976 (age 50); Ghent, Belgium
- Genres: Pop rock
- Occupation: Singer
- Instruments: Vocals, guitar
- Years active: 1996–present
- Member of: Arid
- Website: www.jaspersteverlinck.com

Jasper Steverlinck (born 30 April 1976) is a Belgian Flemish singer and guitarist for Ghent-based Arid.

Steverlinck and his band Arid were finalists at Humo's Rock Rally in 1996. In 2000, Arid released their debut album Little Things of Venom and the follow-up All Is Quiet Now in 2002. Arid also performed several years at Rock Werchter.

In 2002 Steverlinck also started a solo career. His first single, "Life on Mars" in 2003 was a huge success. The single stayed at the top of the Ultratop 50 Official singles chart in Belgium for 8 weeks. His solo album Songs of Innocence also peaked at number one for 5 weeks. In 2005, he became ill with toxoplasmosis and could not work for a long while. He returned to music in 2008 with Arid's third album All Things Come in Waves. In 2012, Steverlinck focussed again on his solo career working with his brother.

In parallel, he became the singer of the newly created project progressive metal band Guilt Machine, by Dutch musician Arjen Anthony Lucassen (creator of Ayreon among others), in 2009. He was featured in their only album, On This Perfect Day, released in 2009.

He also appeared as a guest singer on "Firelight", a song by the Dutch symphonic metal band Within Temptation from their seventh studio album Resist.

== In popular culture ==
In 2001 Steverlinck went to work as a voice actor when he took on the role of Johnny in the movie Haunted Castle.

In 2011–2012, he became one of four coaches in the talent show The Voice van Vlaanderen. Glenn Claes part of his Team Jasper Steverlinck won the inaugural season 1 of the talent show. In 2013, another of his team contestants Paulien Mathues won again on season 2 of the show.

In 2025, he became one of the artists for the talent show, Lift You Up, where he placed fourth with his match, Madaliene.

== Discography ==
=== Albums ===
- Songs of Innocence (2004)
- Uncut (2017), EP
- Night Prayer (2018)
- The Healing (2025)

=== Singles ===
Year	Single	Peak positions		Album
Year	Single	BEL (Fl) Ultratop	BEL (Fl) Ultratip	Album
2003	"Life On Mars" (Jasper Steverlinck + Steven & Stijn Kolacny)	1	—	Songs of Innocence
2003	"Let Her Down Easy" (Jasper Steverlinck & Steven Kolacny)	—	4	Songs of Innocence
2004	"It Must Be Love"	—	3	Songs of Innocence
2005	"Insensitive"	—	17	Songs of Innocence
2015	"Things That I Should Have Done"	49	—	
2017	"That's Not How Dreams Are Made"	29	—	Uncut
2017	"Here's to Love"	6	—	Uncut
2017	"Need Your Love"	—	6	Uncut
2018	"My Day Will Come" (live)	—	35	
2018	"One Thing I Can't Erase" (live)	—	25	
2018	"Turn the Tide" (live)	—	17	
2018	"Broken"	—	4	Night Prayer
2018	"So Far Away from Me"	—	4	Night Prayer
2020	"Stand By Me (live)"	—	5	
