= In Control (US5 album) =

Studio album by US5
- Released: 24 November 2006
- Length: 49:22
- Label: Triple M; Global; Universal
- Producer: Mark Dollar; Mike Michaels; Sammy Naja

US5 chronology
Here We Go (2005)	In Control (2006)	Around the World (2008)

Singles from In Control
- 1. "In The Club" Released: 20 October 2006; 2. "One Night With You" Released: 12 January 2007; 3. "Rhythm Of Life (Shake It Down)" Released: 15 June 2007; 4. "Too Much Heaven" Released: 30 November 2007

In Control is the second studio album by German-based boy group US5. It was released by Triple M Music, Global Music, and Universal Music on 24 November 2006 in German-speaking Europe. The album was in two formats: normal and limited edition. The reloaded version was released in November 2007 and featured 7 new tracks, including the latest singles "Rhythm of Life" and "Too Much Heaven". The re-released edition featured vocals from Vincent Thomas in all songs. It also omits five tracks from the original album ("Let Me Know", "A Girl Like You", "Baby You're the One", "Mama" and "Baby I Like").

== Track listing ==
=== Standard edition ===
1. "In the Club"
2. "Gone"
3. "I Don't Think So"
4. "Bad Girl"
5. "Let Me Know"
6. "As Good As It Gets"
7. "One Night with You"
8. "A Girl Like You"
9. "What About"
10. "I Want You Back"
11. "Be My Girlfriend"
12. "Baby You're the One"
13. "Mama"
14. "Baby I Like" (Bonus Track)

=== Reloaded edition ===
1. "Rhythm of Life" (new)
2. "Gone"
3. "The Rain" (new)
4. "Too Much Heaven" (new)
5. "I Don't Think So"
6. "What About"
7. "Why" (new)
8. "One Night with You"
9. "In the Club"
10. "Bad Girl"
11. "Baby Be Mine" (new)
12. "As Good As It Gets"
13. "I'm with You" (new)
14. "I Want You Back"
15. "Work Your Body" (new)
16. "Be My Girlfriend"
17. "If You Leave" (new)

== Charts ==
Chart (2006)	Peak position
Austrian Albums (Ö3 Austria)	7
German Albums (Offizielle Top 100)	6
Japanese Albums (Oricon)	112
Swiss Albums (Schweizer Hitparade)	44
