= US5 =

Multinational pop boy band

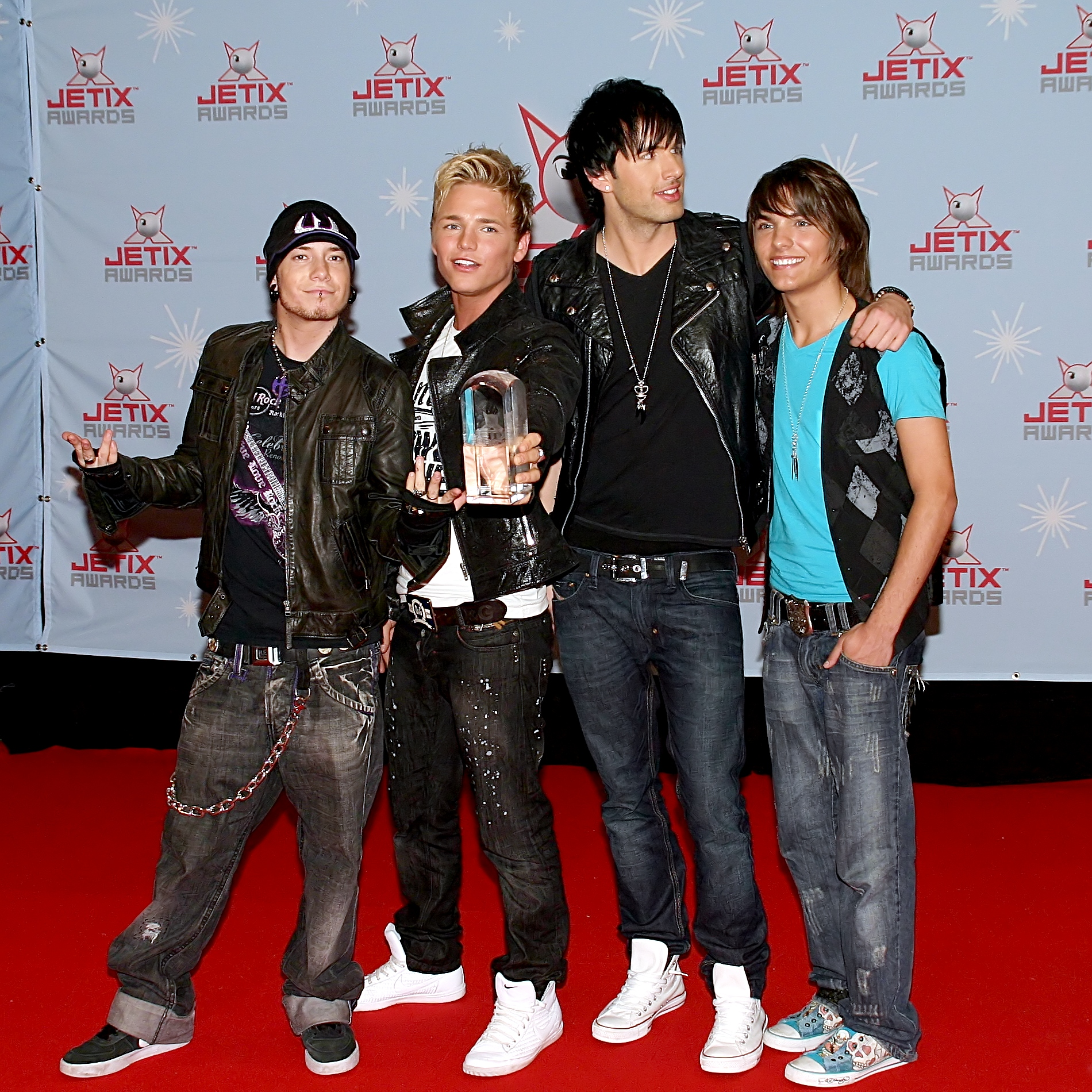
- US5, Berlin (2008)

Background information
- Origin: United Kingdom; United States; Germany
- Genres: Pop, dance-pop
- Years active: 2005–2010
- Labels: Sony BMG/Transcontinental
- Members: Christopher Richard Stringini; Izzy Gallegos; Cayce Clayton; Jay Khan; Jayson Pena
- Past members: Mikel Johnson; Chris Watrin; Vincent Tomas
- Website: None

US5 was a multinational pop boy band. The band originated in 2005 on the German RTL II television reality show Big in America and debuted in June of the same year on Lou Pearlman’s Transcontinental label. US5 became successful throughout central Europe with their first album Here We Go and with several hit records thereafter.

== Career ==
US5 enjoyed success, gaining their first Gold Record in America from their first single called "Maria" released in 2005. The same song went straight in at number 1 in Germany and became a huge summer hit in several other European countries. On the back of the success of "Maria" their debut album titled Here We Go released in October 2005, became a huge success gaining them Gold and Platinum records in Germany and Austria.

In 2006, US5 did a string of school tours and various promotions up and down the UK. This coincided with the second season of Big In America airing on UK's MTV channel. They released 'Maria' and it entered the UK top 40 at number 38. US5 continued their success in central Europe in 2006 and 2007.

Original member Mikel Johnson left the band for a solo career. He was replaced by Vincent Tomas. In 2008, the remaining German member of the band, Chris Watrin, also decided to leave the band citing "lack of interest" as a major reason. US5 released their single "The Boys Are Back" from the successful film High School Musical 3. This was followed by a third studio album titled Around the World.

At the end of 2008, the group welcomed another new member, Cayce Clayton. With four of the five members now being American, the group decided to relocate to the USA. In 2009, Vincent Tomas decided to leave the band. Later in the year, US5 had a competition called Make US5 Again to replace Vincent Tomas. Jayson Pena ended up winning the competition. The last line-up of US5 was Richie Stringini, Izzy Gallegos, Cayce Clayton, Jayson Pena all from the United States, and Jay Khan from England.

== Band members ==
- 2005–2010: Christopher Richard "Richie" Stringini
- 2008-2010: Cayce Clayton
- 2005–2010: Izzy Gallegos
- 2005–2010: Tariq Jay Khan
- 2009–2010: Jayson Pena

=== Former band members ===
- 2005–2007: Michael “Mikel” Johnson
- 2005–2008: Christoph “Chris” Watrin
- 2007-2009: Vincent “Vince” Tomas

== Discography ==
- Here We Go (2005)
- In Control (2006)
- Around the World (2008)
- Back Again (2010)

== Awards and nominations ==
2005

- Gold for - "Maria" (Germany)
- Gold for - "Maria" (USA)
- Gold for Here We Go (Germany)
- Platinum for Here We Go (Germany)
- Goldener Bravo Otto to "Superband Pop"
- Yam! Award "Superstar 2005" for Richie
- German Radio Award als "Best Newcomer Male"
- ADTV Music-Award for "Maria"

2006

- XPress-Award "Goldener Pinguin" to "Best Band"
- Gold for Here We Go (Austria)
- Gold for US 5 - The History (Germany)
- Jetix Kids Award "Best Band"
- Goldener Bravo Otto "Superband Pop"

2007

- Gold for Here We Go in Poland (10,000)
- Gold for In Control in Poland (10,000)
- Radio Regenbogen Award "Popgroup of the Year"
- Steiger Award "Nachwuchs"
- Goldene Kamera "Pop International Band"
- Goldener Otto "Super Band Pop"
- Vivalicious Style Award
- Viva Comet in Polen "Superband // Show of the Year"
- Nickelodeon Kid's Choice Awards "Favoriteband"
- Jetix Kids Award "Best Band"

2008

- Goldener Otto "Beste Band"
- Nickelodeon Kid's Choice Awards "Favoriteband"
- Jetix Kids Award "Best Band"
