= Kristel Verbeke =

Belgian singer

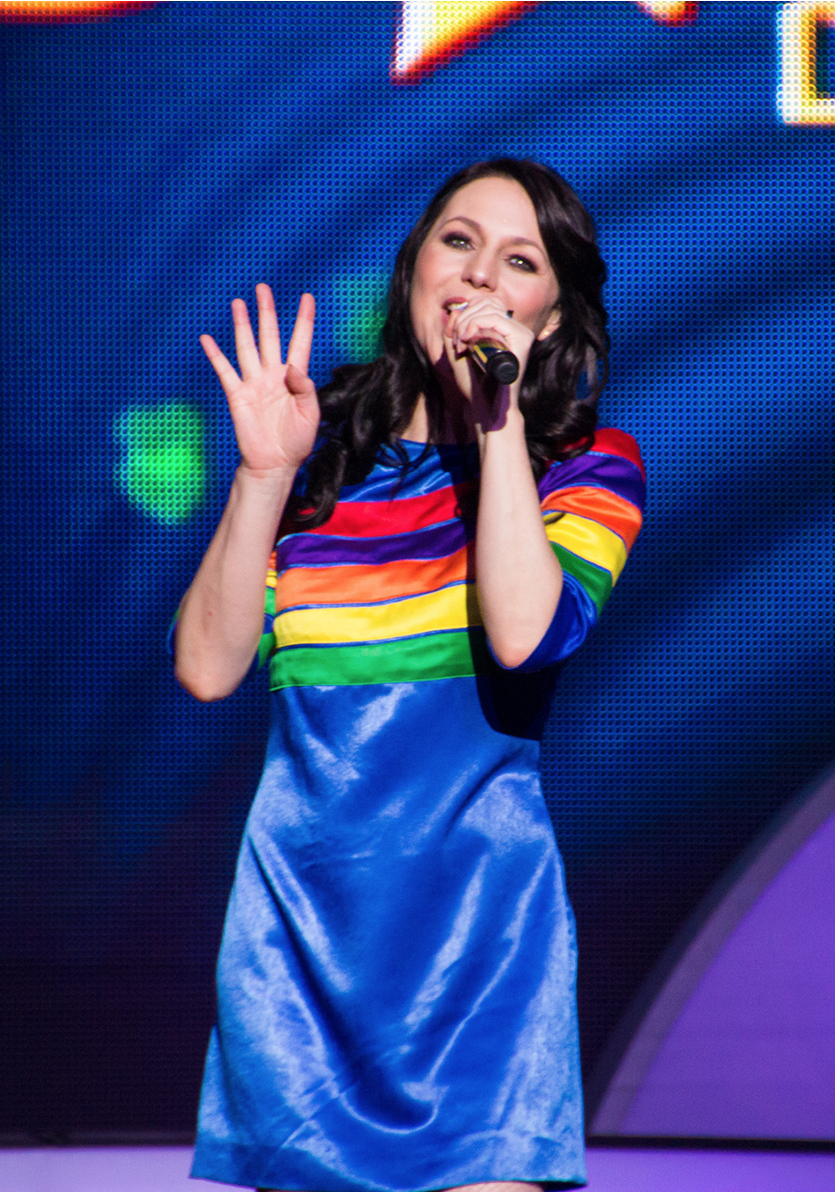

Background information
- Born: Kristel Philemon Charlotte Verbeke; 10 December 1975 (age 50)
- Origin: Hamme, Belgium
- Genre: Pop
- Occupation: Singer
- Instrument: Vocals
- Years active: 1997–present
- Labels: Studio 100, Sony BMG
- Formerly of: K3
- Website: k3.be

Kristel Philemon Charlotte Verbeke (born 10 December 1975) is a Flemish singer. She is known for being a member of the first K3 group, from 1998 until 2015. In 2015, she became the manager of the new K3, remaining in this position until 2017. Since then, Verbeke focused on TV producing and acting.

== Life and career ==
=== Early life ===
Verbeke was born in Hamme. When she was 13, her parents divorced. She lived with her father but kept in touch with her mother. Her two sisters died in their youth. Her younger sister, Véronique died at home at age 11 due to carbon monoxide poisoning, and her older sister Isabelle died in a car accident at age 21. Her father died of lung cancer at the beginning of the K3 breakthrough. After completing secondary education, she studied to be a teacher (regent) for Dutch, history and economics.

Before meeting the other two K3 members Karen Damen and Kathleen Aerts in 1998, she worked as a bank clerk in Laarne and performed in an homage to Ann Christy together with Robert Mosuse, Andrea Croonenberghs and Pascale Michiels. She also sang as a backing vocalist for Niels William, who later became the discoverer and very first manager of K3.

=== K3 ===
William introduced Verbeke to Damen and Aerts, and suggested they participate in the 1999 Eurovision Song Contest. They then entered the preselection's with the song "Heyah Mama". The intention was to make the group the Flemish version of the British all-female group "Spice Girls". Thus, K3 was composed of all females in their twenties, and like the Spice Girls, women in their twenties where originally the target audience. This is noticeable in their early lyrics including their first single, "Wat ik wil" (What I want), whose release was not very successful. Eventually, the group achieved great success with adults, but especially with children.

K3 achieved success after the release of "Heyah Mama," and in 2002 William sold the band to Studio 100. The production company made them an even bigger success, with merchandising, film, TV series and books also being released. Aerts left the band in 2009, while Verbeke and Damen kept on. From 27–29 May 2011, Verbeke, with K3, were guests at De Toppers in the Johan Cruyff Arena (then known as Amsterdam ArenA.) Verbeke and Damen participated to a talent show airing on VTM. Thereafter they made Josje Huisman join the band. Later it was announced that also Verbeke and Damen would leave the band. After K3's label announced that they would look for new members in late 2015, Verbeke herself helped to choose her successor in a televised competition to determine the new K3. The competition started airing in the Netherlands and Belgium in August 2015. Klaasje Meijer, Hanne Verbruggen and Marthe De Pillecyn were designated as the new K3.

Verbeke was then appointed as the new manager of K3 by Studio 100. After two years in this position, in June 2017, she announced that she was stepping down as manager of K3 to make more time for her family and focus on other projects.

=== Post K3 ===
After leaving K3, Verbeke emerged as a TV producer and theater actress. In 2016, she presented Generation K for Ketnet, an educational program broadcast by VRT. In 2021, she presented the TV program Zorgen voor mama, a docuseries about single parents in poverty. Verbeke grew up poor herself and has been putting this topic on the agenda. The first season of Zorgen voor mama was nominated for the Prix d'Europe in the best documentary category. In the spring of 2021, she rejoined Sven De Ridder in the theater comedy Proper Lakens, while also starting to record the second season of Zorgen voor mama.

== Personal life ==
She married singer Gene Thomas and has two daughters, Lily and Nanou.

== Discography ==
Studio albums
- 1999: Parels
- 2000: Alle Kleuren
- 2001: Tele Romeo
- 2002: Verliefd
- 2003: Oya Lele
- 2004: De Wereld Rond
- 2005: Kuma He
- 2006: Ya Ya Yippee
- 2007: Kusjes
- 2009: MaMaSé!
- 2011: Eyo!
- 2012: Engeltjes
- 2013: Loko le

== Filmography ==
Film
Year	Film	Role	Notes
2004	K3 en het Magische Medaillon	Kristel, main role	First K3 theater movie
2006	K3 en het Ijsprinsesje	Kristel, main role	
2006	Piet Piraat en het Vliegende Schip	The Blue Flesh-eating Plant	Voice only
2007	K3 en de Kattenprins	Kristel, main role	
2010	Wicky The Viking: The Movie	Lee Fu	Voice only, (Dutch Dub)
2012	K3 Bengeltjes	Kristel, main role	Sequel following the sitcom.
2014	K3 Dierenhotel	Kristel, main role	Sequel to K3 Bengeltjes
2014	How To Train Your Dragon 2	Valka	Flemish Dub
2015	Phantom Boy	Mom	(Dutch/Flemish Dub)
Television
Year	Title	Role	Notes
1999, 2002	Samson & Gert	Herself, special guest appearance	"K3 Komt Op Bezoek" & "K3 Komt Niet"
2003–2015	De Wereld van K3	Herself, host	Talkshow
2005	FC De Kampioenen	Herself	Cameo, "Het Lied"
2009	De Pfaffs	Herself	Reality series, guest appearance
2009	K2 Zoekt K3	Herself	Talentshow to search for the new K3 member
2010	De Pfaffs	Herself	Reality series, guest appearance
2010	Hallo K3!	Kristel, main role	Sitcom, 2010–2012
2014–2016	Ghostrockers	Elvira De Neve	Recurring role
2015	Perfect!?	Herself	Reality series, guest appearance
2015	K3 zoekt K3	Herself	Judge, talentshow to search for new members for K3
2016	Nieuwe Buren	Herself	Reality series, guest appearance
2016–present	Generatie K	Herself	Host
