= K3 Originals =

2025-26 reunion tour by K3

K3 Originals: de Reünie
- Tour by K3
- Promotional poster for the tour
- Location: Belgium; The Netherlands
- Associated album: The discography of the original K3 lineup (Note: All albums supported by the tour: Parels; Alle kleuren; Tele-Romeo; Verliefd; Oya lélé; De wereld rond; Kuma hé; Ya Ya Yippee; Kusjes)
- Start date: 3 October 2025
- End date: 7 June 2026
- Legs: 3
- No. of shows: 48
- Producer: Studio 100
- Attendance: 812,000+

K3 Originals (officially K3 Originals – De Reünie) was a concert series by the original lineup of Flemish girl group K3, consisting of Karen Damen, Kristel Verbeke, and Kathleen Aerts. It began at the AFAS Dome in Antwerp, Belgium, on 3 October 2025, and concluded idem on 7 June 2026, spanning 48 shows.

Directed by Gert Verhulst and Stefan Staes, and produced by Studio 100, the concerts marked the trio's first performances together since 2009. With over 750,000 tickets sold and over 40 million euro in revenue, K3 Originals has become one of the most commercially successful concert series in the Benelux region, breaking multiple ticket sales and attendance records. The shows in Antwerp have become one of the most-attended concert series at a single venue in concert history.

== Background ==
K3 was started by Flemish music producer Niels William in 1997 under the idea to form a Belgian version of the Spice Girls. It was first called Mascara and consisted of Karen Damen, Kristel Verbeke and Kelly Cobbaut. Ultimately, William managed to find Kathleen Aerts as a replacement after Cobbaut dropped out of the project. The group rose to prominence in 1999 with the single “Heyah Mama”, their bet for the Belgian entry for the Eurovision Song Contest in 1999. Despite being desliked by the jury, "Heyah Mama" peaked at number two on the Ultratop 50 chart, charting for twenty five weeks. They released their first studio album Parels that same year.

In early 2002, Williams sold the K3 trademark to family entertainment company Studio 100. Ever since, K3 has had a significant cultural impact in the Low Countries pop culture. Their music, choreography, and visual identity became closely associated with childhood for a generation, contributing to their long-term popularity and influence. Despite the continuated success, Aerts left the group in 2009, ending the original lineup. She was replaced by Josje Huisman following the televised talent show K2 zoekt K3. In 2015, Damen, Verbeke, and Huisman announced their departure. A new lineup was formed through the television program K3 zoekt K3, marking the first time the group continued without any original members.

In the years that followed, rumors of a reunion of the original trio persisted and intensified. On 24 March 2025, after years of speculation, the reunion concerts were officially announced, confirming the return of the original members. The announcement was widely perceived as a major cultural event, reflecting the enduring popularity and legacy of the original lineup.

== Commercial performance ==
The reunion concerts, branded as K3 Originals, were announced on 24 March 2025. There were originally three shows announced: for 3, 4, and 5 October 2025 at the AFAS Dome in Antwerp, along with two performances scheduled for April 2026 at Rotterdam Ahoy.

Due to exceptionally high demand, additional dates were rapidly added. That same day, the schedule expanded to fourteen concerts in Antwerp and eight in Rotterdam, all of which sold out within a few hours. During the first six hours, over 300,000 tickets were sold. A further expansion was announced on 29 April 2025, adding eight extra shows across both venues. On 8 and 10 October, three additional shows were announced in Antwerp, scheduled for 31 May and 3 June 2026 due to "overwhelming demand". On 13 October, an extra show was announced for 4 June. On 14 November, an additional show in Belgium was announced for 5 June. On 2 and 13 April, additional concerts were announced for 6 and 7 June, respectively.

Ticket sales exceeded 500,000 for the Antwerp concerts alone, setting a new attendance record for the AFAS Dome. The Antwerp residency is the most-attended concert series ever held at a single indoor venue in Belgium, and among the most-attended arena concert runs in Europe. In April 2026, the group received a ticketing award from Ticketmaster for selling more than 750,000 tickets across Belgium and the Netherlands, while ticket sales were still ongoing.

== Critical reception ==
Critical reception of the K3 Originals tour was generally positive. Reviews highlighted the concerts’ strong nostalgic appeal and the emotional connection between the performers and audiences, many of whom had grown up with the group's music.

The production was noted for its large-scale staging, choreography, and audience engagement, with particular emphasis on sing-along moments and the recreation of classic K3 performances. Media coverage frequently described the tour as a cross-generational phenomenon, attracting both children and adults.

== Spin-off media ==
The success of the K3 Originals tour led to the release of related spin-off media and merchandise. Streaming platforms VTM GO and Videoland made several productions connected to the reunion available to subscribers, including K3 Originals: De Reünie, a filmed registration of the group's performance 11 April 2026 at Rotterdam Ahoy.

In addition, the two-part documentary Het Verhaal van Karen, Kristel & Kathleen was released on 6 November 2025, chronicling the history of the original lineup of K3, their rise to fame, breakup, reunion, and preparations for the concert series. The documentary featured archival footage, new interviews, and behind-the-scenes material related to the production.

The reunion also generated a related merchandise line, including an official K3 Originals clothing collection released through Studio 100 and commercialized by JBC in Belgium. The collection included branded apparel and accessories inspired by the original group's visual identity and the reunion concerts, extending the tour's presence beyond live performances.

== Setlist ==
1. "Kuma Hé"
2. "I Love You Baby"
3. "Ya Ya Yippee"
4. "Toveren"
5. "Amor"
6. "De Wereld van K3"
7. "Frans Liedje"
8. "Hart Verloren
9. "Parels"
10. "Hippie Shake"
11. "Oma's Aan de Top"
12. "Superhero"
13. "Trouwen"
14. "Verliefd"
15. "Borst Vooruit"
16. "Kusjesdag"
17. Medley: "Wat Ik Wil" / "Yeke Yeke" / "Mama's en Papa's" / "Dokter Dokter" / "Blub, Ik Ben Een Vis" / "Baby Come Back"
18. "Feest"
19. "Liefdeskapitein"
20. "Leonardo"
21. "Je Hebt Een Vriend"
22. "Alle Kleuren"
23. "De 3 Biggetjes"
24. "Tele-Romeo"
25. "Oya Lélé"
26. "Heyah Mama"

== Tour dates ==
List of 2025 concerts
Date (2025)	City	Country	Venue
3 October	Antwerp	Belgium	AFAS Dome
4 October (Note: This day has both matinée and evening shows.)	Antwerp	Belgium	AFAS Dome
5 October	Antwerp	Belgium	AFAS Dome
6 October	Antwerp	Belgium	AFAS Dome
7 October	Antwerp	Belgium	AFAS Dome
8 October	Antwerp	Belgium	AFAS Dome
9 October	Antwerp	Belgium	AFAS Dome
10 October	Antwerp	Belgium	AFAS Dome
11 October	Antwerp	Belgium	AFAS Dome
12 October	Antwerp	Belgium	AFAS Dome

List of 2026 concerts
Date (2026)	City	Country	Venue
2 April	Rotterdam	Netherlands	Ahoy
3 April	Rotterdam	Netherlands	Ahoy
4 April	Rotterdam	Netherlands	Ahoy
5 April	Rotterdam	Netherlands	Ahoy
6 April	Rotterdam	Netherlands	Ahoy
7 April	Rotterdam	Netherlands	Ahoy
9 April	Rotterdam	Netherlands	Ahoy
10 April	Rotterdam	Netherlands	Ahoy
11 April	Rotterdam	Netherlands	Ahoy
12 April	Rotterdam	Netherlands	Ahoy
13 April	Rotterdam	Netherlands	Ahoy
21 May	Antwerp	Belgium	AFAS Dome
22 May	Antwerp	Belgium	AFAS Dome
23 May	Antwerp	Belgium	AFAS Dome
24 May	Antwerp	Belgium	AFAS Dome
25 May	Antwerp	Belgium	AFAS Dome
27 May	Antwerp	Belgium	AFAS Dome
28 May	Antwerp	Belgium	AFAS Dome
29 May	Antwerp	Belgium	AFAS Dome
30 May	Antwerp	Belgium	AFAS Dome
31 May	Antwerp	Belgium	AFAS Dome
3 June	Antwerp	Belgium	AFAS Dome
4 June	Antwerp	Belgium	AFAS Dome
5 June	Antwerp	Belgium	AFAS Dome
6 June	Antwerp	Belgium	AFAS Dome
7 June	Antwerp	Belgium	AFAS Dome
