= K3 discography =

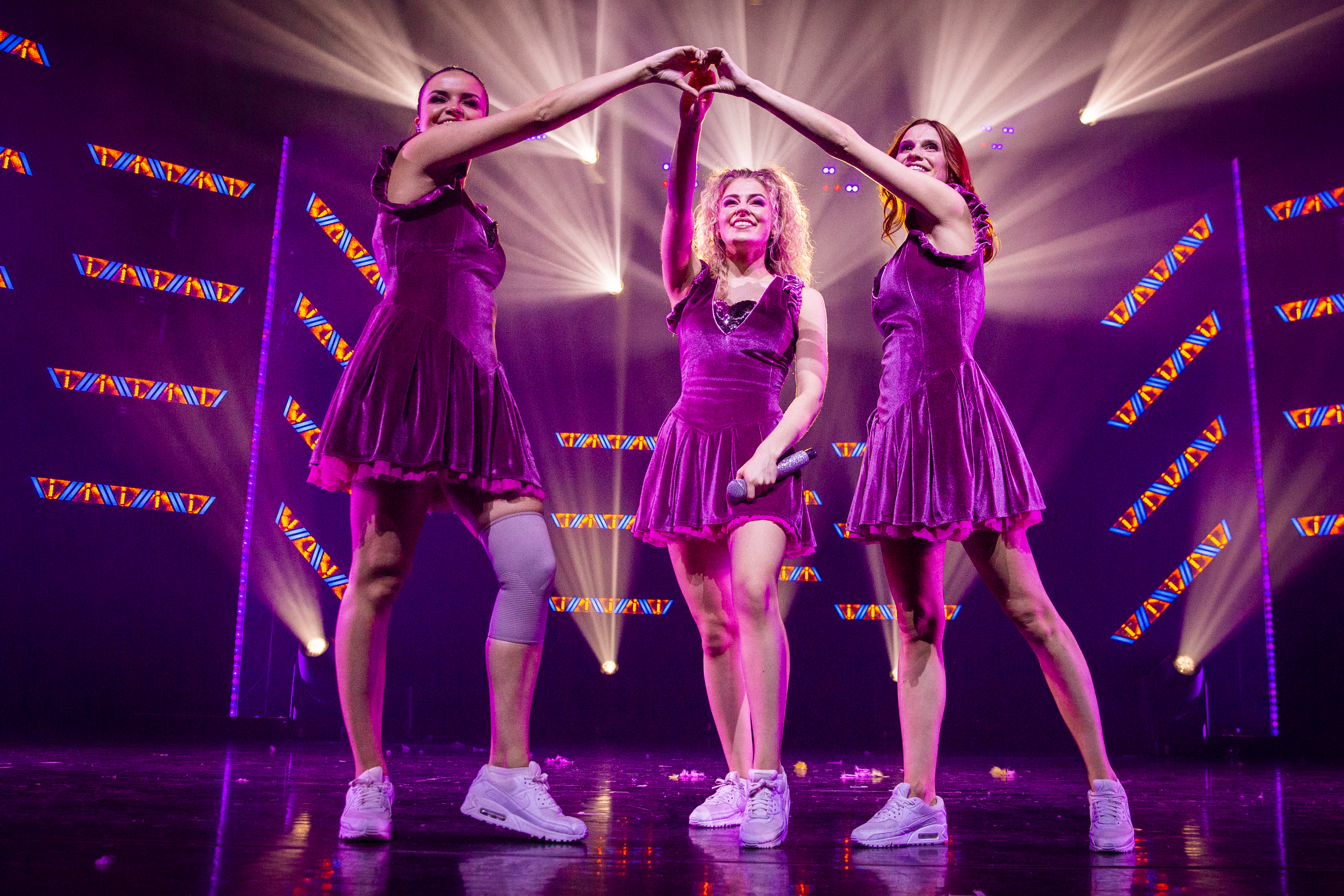
- K3 performing in 2023
- Studio albums: 22
- Soundtrack albums: 4
- Live albums: 4
- Compilation albums: 12
- Singles: 70
- Reissue albums: 1

The discography of K3, a Flemish-Dutch pop group, consists of 22 studio albums, four live albums, 12 compilation albums, four musical soundtrack albums and 42 singles. Their debut album Parels was released in 1999 and peaked at number 2 on the Flemish album chart. Their next singles and albums all became big hits in the Netherlands and Belgium.

== Albums ==
=== Studio albums ===
List of albums, with selected chart positions and certifications
| Title | Album details | Peak chart positions | | | Certifications |
| Title | Album details | BEL (FL) | BEL (WA) | NLD | Certifications |
|---|---|---|---|---|---|
| Parels (Note: The album Parels only charted on the Flemish chart. A 2000 reissue of the album, called Parels 2000 charted also on the Dutch chart, where it reached the 15th position. Both Parels and Parels 2000 reached the second place in the Flemish chart.) | Released: 4 October 1999; Label: Capetown / Wivani; Formats: CD, cassette, digital download, streaming | 2 | — | 15 | BEA: 2× Platinum; NVPI: Platinum |
| Alle kleuren | Released: 15 September 2000; Label: Niels William; Formats: CD, cassette, digital download, LP, streaming | 1 | — | 1 | BEA: 5× Platinum; NVPI: 3× Platinum |
| Tele-Romeo | Released: 3 September 2001; Label: Niels William; Formats: CD, cassette, digital download, LP, streaming | 1 | — | 1 | BEA: 4× Platinum; NVPI: 2× Platinum |
| Verliefd | Released: 9 September 2002; Label: Niels William; Formats: CD, cassette, digital download, streaming | 1 | — | 1 | BEA: 2× Platinum; NVPI: Platinum |
| Oya lélé | Released: 5 September 2003; Label: Studio 100; Formats: CD, digital download, streaming | 1 | — | 1 | BEA: Platinum; NVPI: Platinum |
| De wereld rond | Released: 6 September 2004; Label: Studio 100; Formats: CD, digital download, streaming | 1 | — | 1 | BEA: Gold |
| Kuma hé | Released: 3 October 2005; Label: Studio 100; Formats: CD, digital download, streaming | 1 | — | 1 | BEA: Gold; NVPI: Gold |
| Ya ya yippee | Released: 4 September 2006; Label: Studio 100; Formats: CD, digital download, streaming | 1 | — | 1 | BEA: Platinum |
| Kusjes | Released: 19 October 2007; Label: Studio 100; Formats: CD, digital download, streaming | 4 | — | 2 | BEA: Platinum |
| MaMaSé! | Released: 20 November 2009; Label: Studio 100; Formats: CD, digital download, LP, streaming | 1 | — | 1 | BEA: 4× Platinum; NVPI: Platinum |
| Eyo! | Released: 18 November 2011; Label: Studio 100; Formats: CD, digital download, streaming | 1 | — | 1 | BEA: Platinum |
| Engeltjes | Released: 23 November 2012; Label: Studio 100; Formats: CD, digital download, streaming | 2 | — | 1 | BEA: Platinum |
| Loko le | Released: 22 November 2013; Label: Studio 100; Formats: CD, digital download, streaming | 4 | — | 4 | BEA: Gold |
| 10.000 luchtballonnen | Released: 18 December 2015; Label: Studio 100; Formats: CD, digital download, LP, streaming | 1 | 188 | 2 | BEA: 8× Platinum |
| Ushuaia | Released: 11 November 2016; Label: Studio 100; Formats: CD, digital download, streaming | 1 | — | 3 | BEA: 4× Platinum |
| Love Cruise | Released: 17 November 2017; Label: Studio 100; Formats: CD, digital download, streaming | 1 | — | 4 | BEA: 2× Platinum |
| Roller Disco | Released: 16 November 2018; Label: Studio 100; Formats: CD, digital download, streaming | 1 | — | 3 | BEA: 2× Platinum |
| Dromen | Released: 15 November 2019; Label: Studio 100; Formats: CD, digital download, streaming | 1 | — | 3 | BEA: Platinum |
| Dans van de farao | Released: 13 November 2020; Label: Studio 100; Formats: CD, digital download, streaming | 1 | — | 5 | BEA: Gold |
| Waterval | Released: 17 December 2021; Label: Studio 100; Formats: CD, digital download, LP, streaming | 1 | — | 2 | |
| Vleugels | Released: 17 November 2022; Label: Studio 100; Formats: CD, digital download, LP, streaming | 1 | — | 2 | |
| Superheld | Released: 23 October 2026; Label: Studio 100; Formats: CD, digital download, LP, streaming | 1 | — | 8 | |
"—" denotes items which were not released in that country or failed to chart.

=== Live albums ===
List of live albums, with selected chart positions
| Title | Album details | Peak chart positions | |
| Title | Album details | BEL (FL) | NLD |
|---|---|---|---|
| Dromenshow Live | Released: 8 September 2021; Label: Studio 100; Formats: streaming | — | — |
| Kom erbij! – Live | Released: 20 May 2022; Label: Studio 100; Formats: CD, digital download, streaming | 3 | 6 |
| K3 Show – Zeesterren | Released: 5 September 2025; Label: Studio 100; Formats: CD, digital download, streaming | 4 | 15 |
| K3 Originals – De Reünie Live | Released: 12 June 2026; Label: Studio 100; Formats: CD, LP, streaming | 2 | 2 |

=== Compilation albums ===
List of compilation albums, with selected chart positions and certifications
| Title | Album details | Peak chart positions | | Certifications |
| Title | Album details | BEL (FL) | NLD | Certifications |
|---|---|---|---|---|
| 30 hits in 1 box | Released: December 2001; Label: Niels William | — | 52 | BEA: Gold |
| 5 jaar – Hun grootste hits | Released: 15 March 2004; Label: Studio 100 | 3 | 13 | BEA: Platinum |
| Vakantiehits | Released: 2005; Label: Studio 100 | — | — | |
| Vakantiehits | Released: 6 June 2008; Label: Studio 100 | — | 92 | BEA: Gold |
| Vakantiehits 2 | Released: 1 June 2009; Label: Studio 100 | — | 57 | |
| Vakantiehits | Released: 7 May 2012; Label: Studio 100 | — | — | |
| 15 jaar - De 60 grootste hits! | Released: 29 April 2013; Label: Studio 100 | 4 | 26 | BEA: Gold |
| Het beste van K3 | Released: 19 June 2015; Label: Studio 100 | — (Note: Het beste van K3 did chart on the Ultratop 50 Mid price albums chart, where it reached the peak position.) | — (Note: Het beste van K3 did chart on the Dutch Mid price Top 50 albums chart, where it reached the peak position.) | |
| K3 Toppers | Released: 6 March 2020; Label: Studio 100 | 9 | 45 | |
| Grootste hits van 25 jaar K3 | Released: 26 May 2023; Label: Studio 100 | 2 | 15 | |
| Zomerhits | Released: 28 June 2024; Label: Studio 100 | 5 | 27 | |
| Grootste hits | Released: 26 September 2025; Label: Studio 100 | 3 | 3 | |
"—" denotes items which were not released in that country or failed to chart.

=== Soundtrack albums ===
List of soundtrack albums, with selected chart positions and certifications
| Title | Album details | Peak chart positions | | Certifications |
| Title | Album details | BEL (FL) | NLD | Certifications |
|---|---|---|---|---|
| Doornroosje | Released: 22 March 2002; Label: Studio 100 | 4 | — | |
| De 3 biggetjes | Released: 20 March 2003; Label: Studio 100 | — | — | |
| Alice in Wonderland | Released: 28 March 2011; Label: Studio 100 | 6 | 4 | BEA: Platinum |
| De 3 biggetjes | Released: 2023; Label: Studio 100 | 1 | 6 | |
| Het lied van de zeemeermin | Released: 22 November 2024; Label: Studio 100 | 1 | 11 | |
"—" denotes items which were not released in that country or failed to chart.

== Singles ==
List of singles, with selected chart positions and certifications, showing year released and album name
| Title | Year | Peak chart positions | | | Certifications | Album |
| Title | Year | BEL (FL) | NL Top 40 | NL Top 100 | Certifications | Album |
|---|---|---|---|---|---|---|
| "Wat ik wil" | 1998 | — | — | — | | Parels |
| "Heyah mama" | 1999 | 2 | 18 | 9 | BEA: Platinum | Parels |
| "Yeke yeke" | 1999 | 4 | — | — | BEA: Gold | Parels |
| "I Love You Baby" | 1999 | 11 | — | — | | Parels |
| "Op elkaar (remix)" | 2000 | 40 | — | — | | Parels |
| "Alle kleuren" | 2000 | 2 | — | 33 | BEA: Platinum | Alle kleuren |
| "Yippee yippee" | 2000 | 13 | — | — | | Alle kleuren |
| "Oma's aan de top" (Note: "Oma's aan de top" was released as a double A-side single with "Blub, ik ben een vis" in the Netherlands.) | 2000 | 4 | 18 | 11 | BEA: Gold | Alle kleuren |
| "Hippie shake" | 2001 | 22 | — | — | | Alle kleuren |
| "Tele-Romeo" (Note: "Tele-Romeo" was released as a double A-side single with "Blub, ik ben een vis" in Flanders.) | 2001 | 1 | — | 29 | BEA: 2× Platinum | Tele-Romeo |
| "Blub, ik ben een vis!" (Note: "Blub, ik ben een vis" was released as a double A-side single with "Tele-Romeo" in Flanders.) (Note: "Blub, ik ben een vis" was released as a double A-side single with "Oma's aan de top" in the Netherlands.) | 2001 | 1 | 18 | 11 | BEA: 2× Platinum | Tele-Romeo |
| "Mama's en papa's" | 2001 | 18 | — | — | | Tele-Romeo |
| "Je hebt een vriend" | 2001 | 20 | — | — | | Tele-Romeo |
| "Toveren" | 2002 | 3 | 3 | 1 | BEA: Platinum | Tele-Romeo |
| "Feest" | 2002 | 7 | 8 | 3 | BEA: Gold | Verliefd |
| "Papapa" | 2002 | 13 | — (Note: "Papapa" did not enter the Dutch Top 40, but peaked at number two on the Tipparade chart, which acts as an extension to the Top 40.) | 34 | | Verliefd |
| "Verliefd" | 2002 | 18 | — (Note: "Verliefd" did not enter the Dutch Top 40, but peaked at number ten on the Tipparade chart, which acts as an extension to the Top 40.) | 43 | | Verliefd |
| "De 3 biggetjes" | 2003 | 5 | 21 | 4 | | Oya lélé |
| "Oya lélé" | 2003 | 2 | 9 | 4 | BEA: Gold | Oya lélé |
| "Frans liedje" | 2003 | 21 | — | 46 | | Oya lélé |
| "Hart verloren" | 2004 | 30 | — | 19 | | Oya lélé |
| "Liefdeskapitein" | 2004 | 8 | 4 | 3 | | De wereld rond |
| "Superhero" | 2004 | 16 | — | 21 | | De wereld rond |
| "Zou er iemand zijn op Mars?" | 2004 | — (Note: "Zou er iemand zijn op Mars?" did not enter the Ultratop 50, but peaked at number four on the Ultratip chart, which acts as an extension to the Ultratop 50.) | — | 54 | | De wereld rond |
| "Kuma hé" | 2005 | 2 | 2 | 1 | BEA: Gold | Kuma hé |
| "Borst vooruit" | 2005 | 13 | 31 | 10 | | Kuma hé |
| "Ya ya yippee" | 2006 | 3 | 25 | 15 | BEA: Gold | Ya ya yippee |
| "Dokter, dokter" | 2006 | 28 | — | 96 | | Ya ya yippee |
| "Kusjesdag" | 2007 | 7 | 7 | 9 | BEA: Gold | Kusjes |
| "Je mama ziet je graag" | 2008 | 38 | — (Note: "Je mama ziet je graag" did not enter the Dutch Top 40, but peaked at number four on the Tipparade chart, which acts as an extension to the Top 40.) | 49 | | Kusjes |
| "De Revolutie!" | 2008 | 14 | 10 | 48 | | MaMaSé! |
| "MaMaSé!" | 2009 | 1 | 2 | 1 | BEA: Gold; NVPI: Platinum | MaMaSé! |
| "Hallo K3" | 2010 | 2 | — | 11 | | Eyo! |
| "Alice in Wonderland" | 2011 | 7 | — | 24 | | Alice in Wonderland |
| "Eyo!" | 2011 | 11 | — | 25 | | Eyo! |
| "Waar zijn die engeltjes" | 2012 | 16 | — | 62 | | Engeltjes |
| "Koning Willem-Alexander" | 2013 | — (Note: "Koning Willem-Alexander" did not enter the Ultratop 50, but peaked at number 55 on the Ultratip chart, which acts as an extension to the Ultratop 50.) | — | 90 | | Loko le |
| "Eya hoya!" | 2013 | — (Note: "Eya hoya!" did not enter the Ultratop 50, but peaked at number four on the Ultratip chart, which acts as an extension to the Ultratop 50.) | — | — | | Loko le |
| "Loko le" | 2013 | — (Note: "Loko le" did not enter the Ultratop 50, but peaked at number thirteen on the Ultratip chart, which acts as an extension to the Ultratop 50.) | — | — | | Loko le |
| "K3 kan het!" | 2014 | — (Note: "K3 kan het!" did not enter the Ultratop 50, but peaked at number 54 on the Ultratip chart, which acts as an extension to the Ultratop 50.) | — | — | | Non-album single |
| "K3 Loves You" | 2015 | 14 | — | — | | Het beste van K3 |
| "10.000 luchtballonnen" | 2015 | 1 | — (Note: "10.000 luchtballonnen" did not enter the Dutch Top 40, but peaked at number 22 on the Tipparade chart, which acts as an extension to the Top 40.) | 61 | BEA: Platinum | 10.000 luchtballonnen |
| "Jodelee" | 2016 | — (Note: "Jodelee" did not enter the Ultratop 50, but peaked at number 39 on the Ultratip chart, which acts as an extension to the Ultratop 50.) | — | — | | 10.000 luchtballonnen |
| "Ushuaia" | 2016 | 34 | — | — | | Ushaia |
| "Love Boat Baby" | 2016 | — (Note: "Love Boat Baby" did not enter the Ultratop 50, but peaked at number 20 on the Ultratip chart, which acts as an extension to the Ultratop 50.) | — | — | | Ushaia |
| "De aarde beeft" | 2016 | — (Note: "De aarde beeft" did not enter the Ultratop 50, but peaked at number 15 on the Ultratip chart, which acts as an extension to the Ultratop 50.) | — | — | | Ushaia |
| "Play-O" | 2017 | — | — | — | | Ushaia |
| "Aliyee" | 2017 | — | — | — | | Ushaia |
| "Pina Colada" | 2017 | 49 | — | — | | Love Cruise |
| "Liefde is overal" | 2017 | — | — | — | | Love Cruise |
| "Disco oma" | 2018 | — | — | — | | Love Cruise |
| "Whoppa!" | 2018 | — (Note: "Whoppa!" did not enter the Ultratop 50, but peaked at number 44 on the Ultratip chart, which acts as an extension to the Ultratop 50.) | — | — | | Roller Disco |
| "Luka Luna" | 2018 | — (Note: "Luka Luna" did not enter the Ultratop 50, but peaked at number 22 on the Ultratip chart, which acts as an extension to the Ultratop 50.) | — | — | | Roller Disco |
| "Roller Disco" | 2018 | — | — | — | | Roller Disco |
| "Land van de regenboog" | 2019 | — | — | — | | Dromen |
| "Heyah Mama 2.0" | 2019 | — (Note: "Heyah Mama 2.0" did not enter the Ultratop 50, but peaked at number 15 on the Ultratip chart, which acts as an extension to the Ultratop 50.) | — | — | | Dromen |
| "Jij bent mijn Gigi" | 2019 | — (Note: "Jij bent mijn Gigi" did not enter the Ultratop 50, but peaked at number 40 on the Ultratip chart, which acts as an extension to the Ultratop 50.) | — | — | | Dromen |
| "Altijd blijven dromen" | 2019 | — | — | — | | Dromen |
| "Jij bent mooi" | 2019 | — | — | — | | Dromen |
| "Bubbel" | 2020 | — | — | — | | Dans van de farao |
| "Bikini vol zand" | 2020 | — | — | — | | Dans van de farao |
| "Dans van de farao" | 2020 | — | — | — | | Dans van de farao |
| "Piramide van liefde" | 2020 | — | — | — | | Dans van de farao |
| "Beter als je danst" | 2021 | — | — | — | | Non-album single |
| "Waterval" | 2021 | 1 | — | 89 | | Waterval |
| "Nooit meer oorlog" | 2022 | — | — | — | | Vleugels |
| "Tjikke boem" | 2022 | — | — | — | | Waterval |
| "Mango Mango" | 2022 | — | — | — | | Vleugels |
| "Vleugels" | 2022 | — | — | — | | Vleugels |
| "Visje in het water" | 2022 | — | — | — | | Vleugels |
| "Fata Morgana" | 2023 | — | — | — | | Het lied van de zeemeermin |
| "De 3 Biggetjes" | 2023 | — | — | — | | De 3 biggetjes |
| "Zomer van Liefde" | 2024 | — | — | — | | Het lied van de zeemeermin |
| "Het Lied van de Zeermeermin" | 2024 | — | — | — | | Het lied van de zeemeermin |
| "Iliake" (with Nora Gharib) | 2025 | — | — | — | | Superheld |
| "Goden" | 2025 | 40 | — | — | | Superheld |
| "Toveren" | 2025 | — | — | — | | Superheld |
| "Tik Tok Tobias" | 2025 | — | — | — | | Superheld |
| "Liefde Love Amour" | 2026 | — | — | — | | Superheld |
| "Schaduw" (with Donnie) | 2026 | — | — | — | | Superheld |
| "De zomer van Oya Lélé" | 2026 | 19 | — | — | | Superheld |
"—" denotes items which were not released in that country or failed to chart.

== Other charted songs ==
List of other charted songs, showing year released and album name
| Title | Year | Peak chart positions | Album |
| Title | Year | BEL (FLA) | Album |
|---|---|---|---|
| "De politie" | 2009 | 43 | MaMaSé! |
| "Zeg eens AAA" | 2013 | — (Note: "Zeg eens AAA" did not enter the Ultratop 50, but peaked at number 68 on the Ultratip chart, which acts as an extension to the Ultratop 50.) | Engeltjes |
| "Parapluutje" | 2013 | — (Note: "Parapluutje" did not enter the Ultratop 50, but peaked at number 62 on the Ultratip chart, which acts as an extension to the Ultratop 50.) | Engeltjes |
| "Drums gaan boem" | 2014 | — (Note: "Drums gaan boem" did not enter the Ultratop 50, but peaked at number 27 on the Ultratip chart, which acts as an extension to the Ultratop 50.) | Loko le |
| "En ik dans" | 2014 | — (Note: "En ik dans" did not enter the Ultratop 50, but peaked at number 69 on the Ultratip chart, which acts as an extension to the Ultratop 50.) | Loko le |
| "Eyo!" (Dauwe & Vancoillie Remix) | 2015 | 2 | Non-album single |
| "Als het binnenregent" | 2015 | 24 | 10.000 luchtballonen |
| "Jij bent de bom!" | 2015 | 31 | 10.000 luchtballonen |
| "Kus van de juf" | 2015 | 39 | 10.000 luchtballonen |
| "Kusjessoldaten" | 2015 | 48 | 10.000 luchtballonen |
"—" denotes items which were not released in that country or failed to chart.
