= Karen Damen =

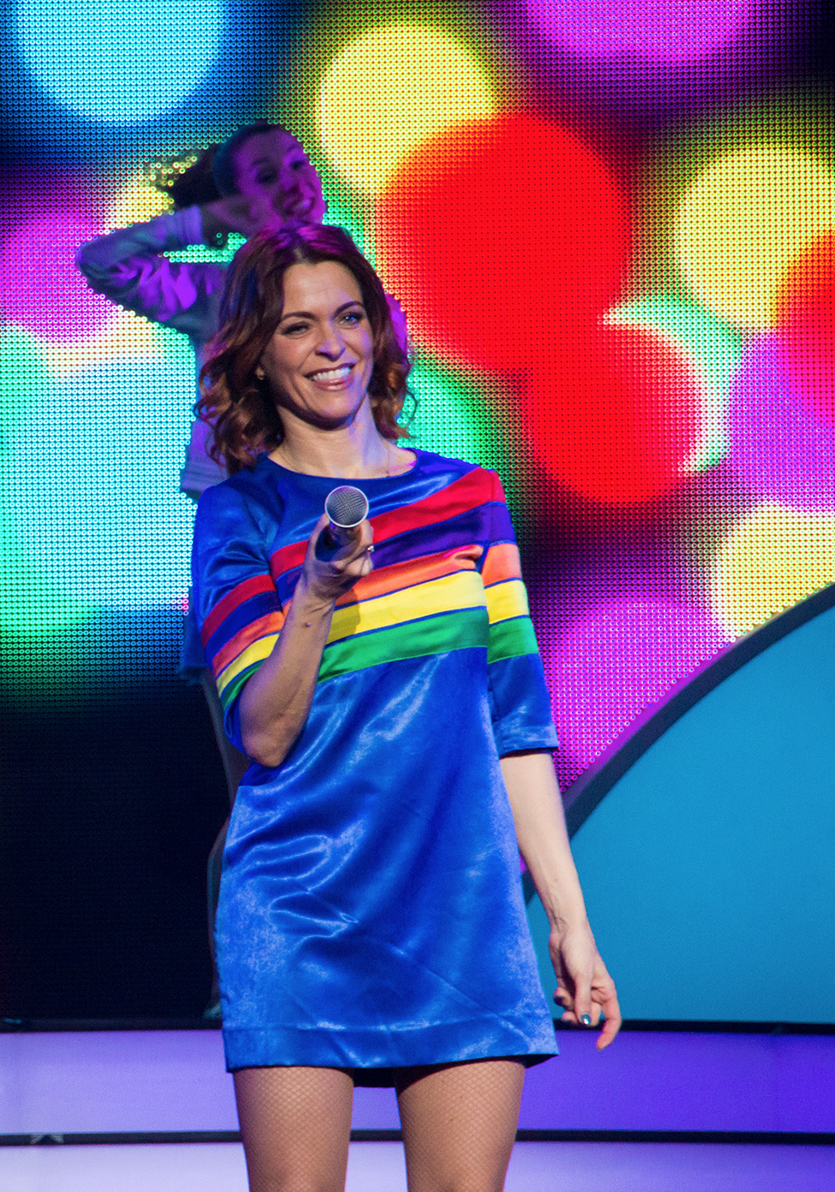
- Born: Karen Franciska Maria Louisa Damen; 28 October 1974 (age 51); Wilrijk, Belgium
- Occupations: Singer; actress; host; musical actress
- Years active: 1998–present
- Notable work: K3 discography
- Spouse: Antony Van der Wee (m. 2016; div. 2023)
- Children: 1
- Musical career
- Genre: Pop
- Instruments: Vocals
- Label: Studio 100
- Member of: K3
- Website: www.k3.be
- Website: www.karendamen.be

Karen Franciska Maria Louisa Damen (Dutch pronunciation: [ˈkaːrə(n) ˈdaːmə(n)]; born 28 October 1974) is a Belgian singer, actress, host and one of the first members of girl group K3. She acted in a few movies and hosted a few programs.

== Discography ==
Studio albums (as a member of K3)
- 1999: Parels
- 2000: Alle Kleuren
- 2001: Tele Romeo
- 2002: Verliefd
- 2003: Oya Lele
- 2004: De Wereld Rond
- 2005: Kuma He
- 2006: Ya Ya Yipee
- 2007: Kusjes
- 2009: MaMaSé!
- 2011: Eyo!
- 2012: Engeltjes
- 2013: Loko le

Solo Studio albums
- 2018: Een Ander Spoor

== Filmography ==
Film
Year	Film	Role	Notes
2004	K3 en het Magische Medaillon	Karen	First K3 theater movie, main role
2006	K3 en het Ijsprinsesje	Karen	Main role
2006	Piet Piraat en het Vliegende Schip	The Red Flesh-eating Plant	Voice only, supporting role
2007	K3 en de Kattenprins	Karen	Main role
2012	K3 Bengeltjes	Karen	Main role
2013	K3 Dierenhotel	Karen	Main role
2013	Finding Dory	Destiny	Belgian Dutch Dub
Television
Year	Title	Role	Notes
2000	Samson & Gert, episode K3 op bezoek	Herself	Special guest star in children's sitcom
2002	Samson & Gert, episode K3 komt niet	Herself	Special guest star in children's sitcom
2003–2013	De Wereld van K3	Herself	Host of children's talkshow
2005	FC De Kampioenen, episode Het lied	Herself	Cameo in sitcom
2006–2007	Het Huis Anubis	Esther Verlinden	Recurring role in children's soap opera
2009	De Pfaffs	Herself	Guest appearance in reality series
2009	K2 Zoekt K3	Herself	Judge/coach in talent show
2010	De Pfaffs	Herself	Guest appearance in reality series
2010–2012	Hallo K3!	Karen	Main role in children's sitcom
2012–2015	Belgium's Got Talent	Herself	Judge in talent show
2015	K3 Zoekt K3	Herself	Judge/coach in talent show
2015	Karen en De Coster	Herself	Co-host of talkshow
2015	Perfect	Herself	Host/subject of reality series
2015	Lolirock	Auriana	Dutch voice-over in children's animated series
2016	Glammertime	Herself	Host of showbizz magazine
2016	Nieuwe Buren	Herself	Subject of reality series
2017	Camping Karen en James	Herself	Host/subject of reality series
2017	Perfect	Herself	Host/subject of reality series
2018	Karen maakt een plaat	Herself	Subject of reality series
2019–	Familie	Vanessa Mariën	Recurring role in soap opera
2020	#LikeMe	Saskia Vleugels	Recurring role in children's drama
2020–	The Voice Senior	Herself	Judge in talent show
2020–	The Masked Singer	Herself	Judge in celebrity talent show
