= List of best-selling albums in Belgium =

Albums in Belgium are certified since 1995 by Belgian Entertainment Association. From 1995 to May 2007, gold/platinum levels for domestic albums were 15,000/30,000 while for international album 25,000/50,000. Since May 2007 to today gold/platinum domestic levels are 10,000/20,000 while international gold/platinum levels are 15,000/30,000. Ever since July 2017 gold level is 10,000 and platinum 20,000.

== Best-selling albums of all-time in Belgium ==
Year	Artist	Album	Sales	Notes
1995	Helmut Lotti	Helmut Lotti goes Classic	600,000	
1996	Helmut Lotti	Helmut Lotti goes Classic II	500,000	
1995	Nirvana	Nevermind	400,000	
1992	ABBA	ABBA Gold	350,000	
1995	Andrea Bocelli	Bocelli	350,000	
1996	Helmut Lotti	Helmut Lotti goes Classic III	350,000	
1995	Celine Dion	D'eux	300,000	
1995	Clouseau	Oker	300,000	
1983	Michael Jackson	Thriller	300,000	
1997	U2	The Best of 1980–1990	300,000	
1989	Clouseau	Hoezo	271,000	
2000	Beatles	1	250,000	
2001	Marco Borsato	Onderweg	250,000	
1995	Michael Jackson	HIStory: Past, Present and Future, Book I	250,000	
1980	Barbra Streisand	Guilty	250,000	
2015	Adele	25	240,000	
2013	Stromae	Racine carrée	240,000	
1977	Bee Gees	Saturday Night Fever	200,000	
1984	Bob Marley and the Wailers	Legend	200,000	
1993	Bryan Adams	So Far So Good	200,000	
1995	Celine Dion	Falling into You	200,000	
1997	Celine Dion	Let's Talk About Love	200,000	
1996	Clouseau	Adrenaline	200,000	
1985	Dire Straits	Brothers in Arms	200,000	
1998	Helmut Lotti	Helmut Lotti goes Classic Final Edition	200,000	
1973	Neil Diamond	Jonathan Livingston Seagull	200,000	
1992	Whitney Houston	The Bodyguard	200,000	
1994	Francis Cabrel	Samedi soir sur la Terre	200,000	
2011	Adele	21	180,000	
2015	K3	10.000 luchtballonnen	160,000	
1993	Axelle Red	Sans plus attendre	150,000	
2006	Amy Winehouse	Back to Black	150,000	
1997	Buena Vista Social Club	Buena Vista Social Club	150,000	
1999	Britney Spears	...Baby One More Time	150,000	
2000	Britney Spears	Oops!... I Did It Again	150,000	
1999	Celine Dion	All the Way... A Decade of Song	150,000	
2003	Dido	Life for Rent	150,000	
1999	Dido	No Angel	150,000	
1990	Elton John	The Very Best of Elton John	150,000	
2004	James Blunt	Back to Bedlam	150,000	
1997	James Horner	Titanic: Music from the Motion Picture	150,000	
2000	K3	Alle kleuren	150,000	
2000	Helmut Lotti	Latino Classics	150,000	
1999	Helmut Lotti	Out of Africa	150,000	
2000	Madonna	Music	150,000	
2007	Mika	Life in Cartoon Motion	150,000	
1997	Shania Twain	Come On Over	150,000	
1997	Spice Girls	Spice	150,000	
2021	Angèle	Brol	140,000	
2001	K3	Tele-Romeo	120,000	
1995	Alanis Morissette	Jagged Little Pill	100,000	
1992	Andrea Bocelli	Il mare calmo della sera	100,000	
1997	Andrea Bocelli	Romanza	100,000	
1999	Backstreet Boys	Millennium	100,000	
2002	Celine Dion	A New Day Has Come	100,000	
1993	Celine Dion	The Colour of My Love	100,000	
1997	Clouseau	87*97	100,000	
2000	Coldplay	Parachutes	100,000	
2002	Coldplay	A Rush of Blood to the Head	100,000	
2005	Coldplay	X&Y	100,000	
2000	Craig David	Born to Do It	100,000	
2000	Enya	A Day Without Rain	100,000	
2000	Eminem	The Marshall Mathers LP	100,000	
1997	Enya	Paint the Sky with Stars	100,000	
1997	Eros Ramazzotti	Eros	100,000	
1991	Enya	Shepherd Moons	100,000	
1987	Francis Cabrel	77-87	100,000	
1998	George Michael	Ladies & Gentlemen: The Best of George Michael	100,000	
1977	Jacques Brel	Brel	100,000	
2006	Justin Timberlake	FutureSex/LoveSounds	100,000	
2000	Linkin Park	Hybrid Theory	100,000	
1993	Mariah Carey	Music Box	100,000	
1999	Moby	Play	100,000	
1995	Norah Jones	Come Away With Me	100,000	
1997	Radiohead	OK Computer	100,000	
2003	R.E.M.	In Time: The Best of R.E.M. 1988–2003	100,000	
1999	Santana	Supernatural	100,000	
1991	Tina Turner	Simply the Best	100,000	
1999	Texas	The Greatest Hits	100,000	
1994	The Cranberries	No Need to Argue	100,000	
2002	U2	The Best of 1990–2000	100,000	
2000	U2	All That You Can't Leave Behind	100,000	
1992	Vangelis	1492: Conquest of Paradise	100,000	
