= The Voice Senior (Belgian TV series) =

- Genre: Reality television
- Created by: John de Mol Jr.
- Presented by: An Lemmens
- Judges: Helmut Lotti; Dana Winner; Natalia Druyts; Walter Grootaers; Karen Damen; Sam Gooris; André Hazes jr.
- Country of origin: Belgium
- Original language: Dutch
- No. of seasons: 2

Production
- Producer: Talpa Media Group

Original release
- Network: VTM
- Release: 7 December 2018 – 11 December 2020

Related
- The Voice (franchise); The Voice van Vlaanderen; The Voice Senior (Dutch TV series); The Voice Belgique

The Voice Senior is a Belgian reality singing competition for the Flemish part of Belgium, and which is part of the franchise that started in the Netherlands as The Voice of Holland. It kicked off in 2018 on VTM, shortly before the francophonie Belgian variant The Voice Belgique went on air.

One of the important premises of the show is the quality of the singing talent. Four coaches, themselves popular performing artists, train the talents in their group and occasionally perform with them. Talents are selected in blind auditions, where the coaches cannot see, but only hear the auditioner.

== Format ==
The series consists of three phases: a blind audition, a battle phase, and live performance shows. Four judges/coaches, all noteworthy recording artists, choose teams of contestants through a blind audition process. Each judge has the length of the auditioner's performance (about one minute) to decide if he or she wants that singer on his or her team; if two or more judges want the same singer (as happens frequently), the singer has the final choice of coach.

Each team of singers is mentored and developed by its respective coach. In the second stage, called the battle phase, coaches have two of their team members battle against each other directly by singing the same song together, with the coach choosing which team member to advance from each of four individual "battles" into the first live round. Within that first live round, the surviving four acts from each team again compete head-to-head, with public votes determining one of two acts from each team that will advance to the final eight, while the coach chooses which of the remaining three acts comprises the other performer remaining on the team.

In the final phase, the remaining contestants (Final 8) compete against each other in live broadcasts. The television audience and the coaches have equal say 50/50 in deciding who moves on to the final 4 phase. With one team member remaining for each coach, the (final 4) contestants compete against each other in the finale with the outcome decided solely by public vote.

== Coaches and hosts ==
On 17 December 2017 VTM announced they will produce a new singing competition for singers over the age of 60, which entitled Talpa's The Voice Senior, with Walter Grootaers as the first coach announced. On 29 June 2018 the coaching panel for the first season was confirmed with Grootaers, Helmut Lotti, Dana Winner and Natalia Druyts, who is also a coach on the Adult and Kids versions. Former host of The Voice Van Vlaanderen and The Voice Kids, An Lemmens, appointed as hosts for the first season.

On 26 November 2019 it was announced that Karen Damen, Sam Gooris and André Hazes jr. would replace Lotti, Natalia and Winner as new coaches, along with returning coach Grootaers.

Coaches	Seasons	
Coaches	1	2
Walter Grootaers		
Dana Winner		
Natalia Druyts		
Helmut Lotti		
Sam Gooris		
Karen Damen		
André Hazes jr.		

== Coaches and finalists ==
– Winner
– Runner-Up
– Third Place
– Fourth Place

Season	Coaches and their finalists			
1	Helmut Lotti	Walter Grootaers	Natalia Druyts	Dana Winner
1	Rita Roelandt; Harry Francis	John Leo; Karel Meganck	François Van den Broeck; Miet Luyten	Lou Driesen; Michel Acass
2	Sam Gooris	André Hazes	Karen Damen	Walter Grootaers
2	Didier; Doortje	Roland Van Beeck; Hedwig	Marie-Jeanne; Eddie Conard	Robin Rowley; Gerda

== Series overview ==
Colour key

Team Helmut
Team Walter
Team Natalia
Team Dana
Team Sam
Team Karen
Team André

Season	First aired	Last aired	Winner	Runner-up	Third place	Fourth place	Winning coach	Presenter	Coaches (chairs' order)			
Season	First aired	Last aired	Winner	Runner-up	Third place	Fourth place	Winning coach	Presenter	1	2	3	4
1	7 Dec 2018	28 Dec 2018	John Leo	Rita Roelandt	François Van den Broeck	Lou Driesen	Walter Grootaers	An Lemmens	Helmut	Walter	Natalia	Dana
2	20 Nov 2020	11 Dec 2020	Roland Van Beeck	Didier	Marie-Jeanne	Robin Rowley	André Hazes	An Lemmens	Sam	André	Karen	Walter

== See also ==
- The Voice (franchise)
