= AFAS Dome =

Multipurpose indoor arena in Antwerp, Belgium

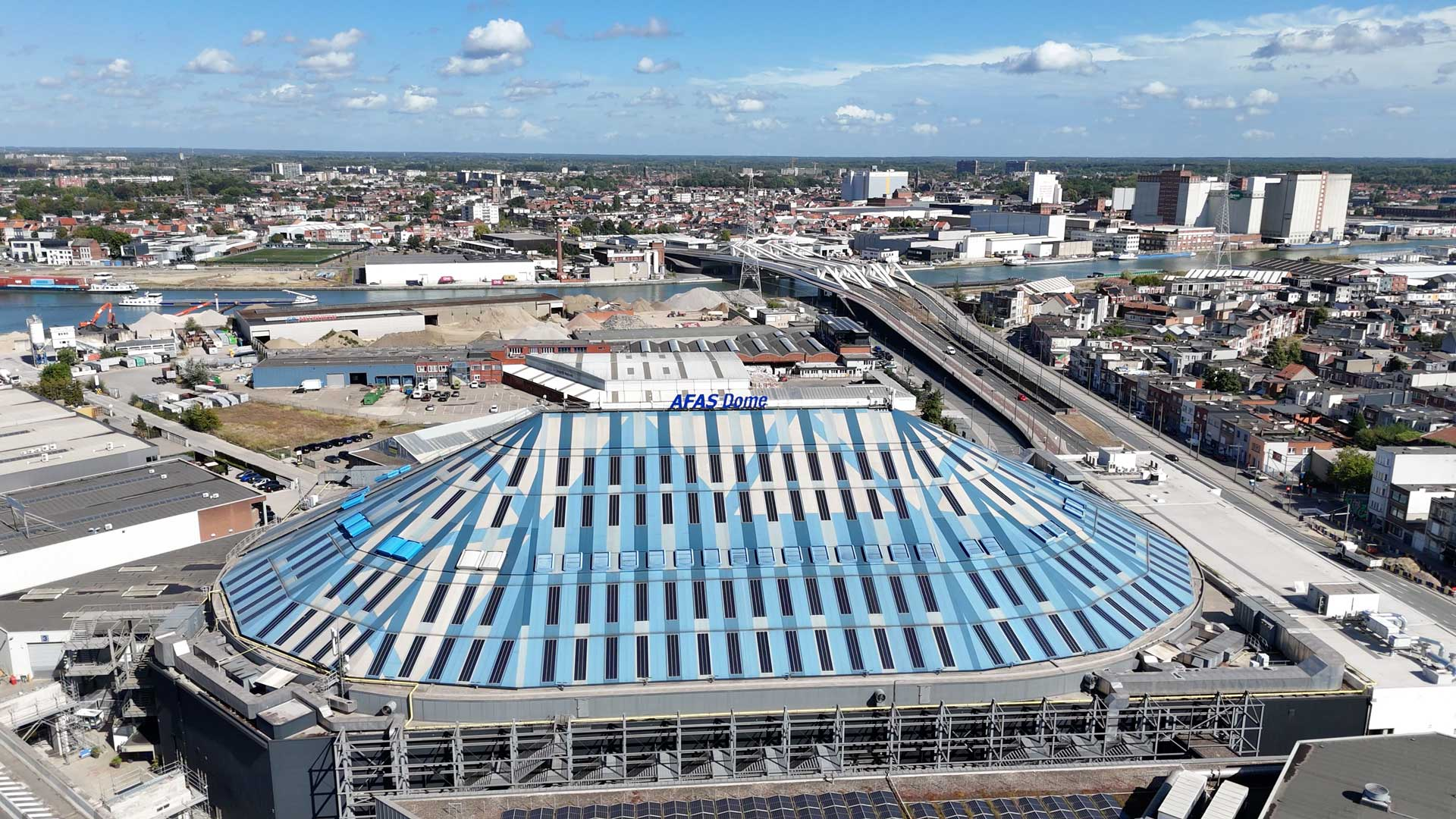
- Interactive map of AFAS Dome
- Former names: Sportpaleis (1933-2025)
- Address: Schijnpoortweg 119, 2170 Antwerpen
- Owner: Province of Antwerp
- Operator: be•at
- Capacity: 23,001 (maximum, standing floor); 18,575 (maximum, seated)

Construction
- Built: 1932-1933
- Opened: 11 September 1933
- Renovated: 1999, 2010-2013
- Architect: Albert Herent

Website
- www.afas-dome.be/en

The AFAS Dome (formerly Sportpaleis) is an indoor arena in Antwerp, Belgium. It is a multipurpose hall used for organizing concerts, sporting events, festivals, and fairs. The arena was built for sport, especially track cycling, but there is now little sport held there; it previously hosted the Diamond Games tennis tournament for women.

According to Billboard Magazine, for the period 2007/8 Sportpaleis was the second most visited event hall in the world, second only to Madison Square Garden. The AFAS Dome is known for performances by both Dutch-speaking and international artists.

== Construction ==
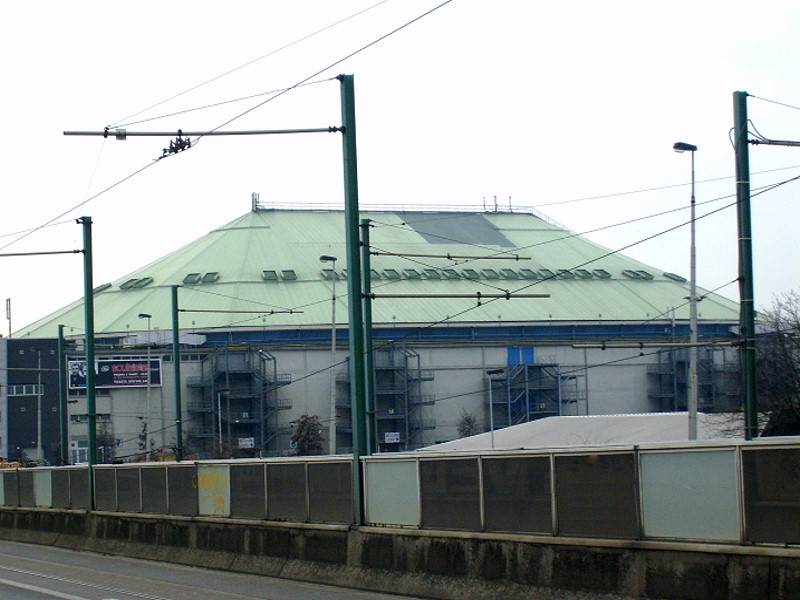
Sportpaleis in June 2007

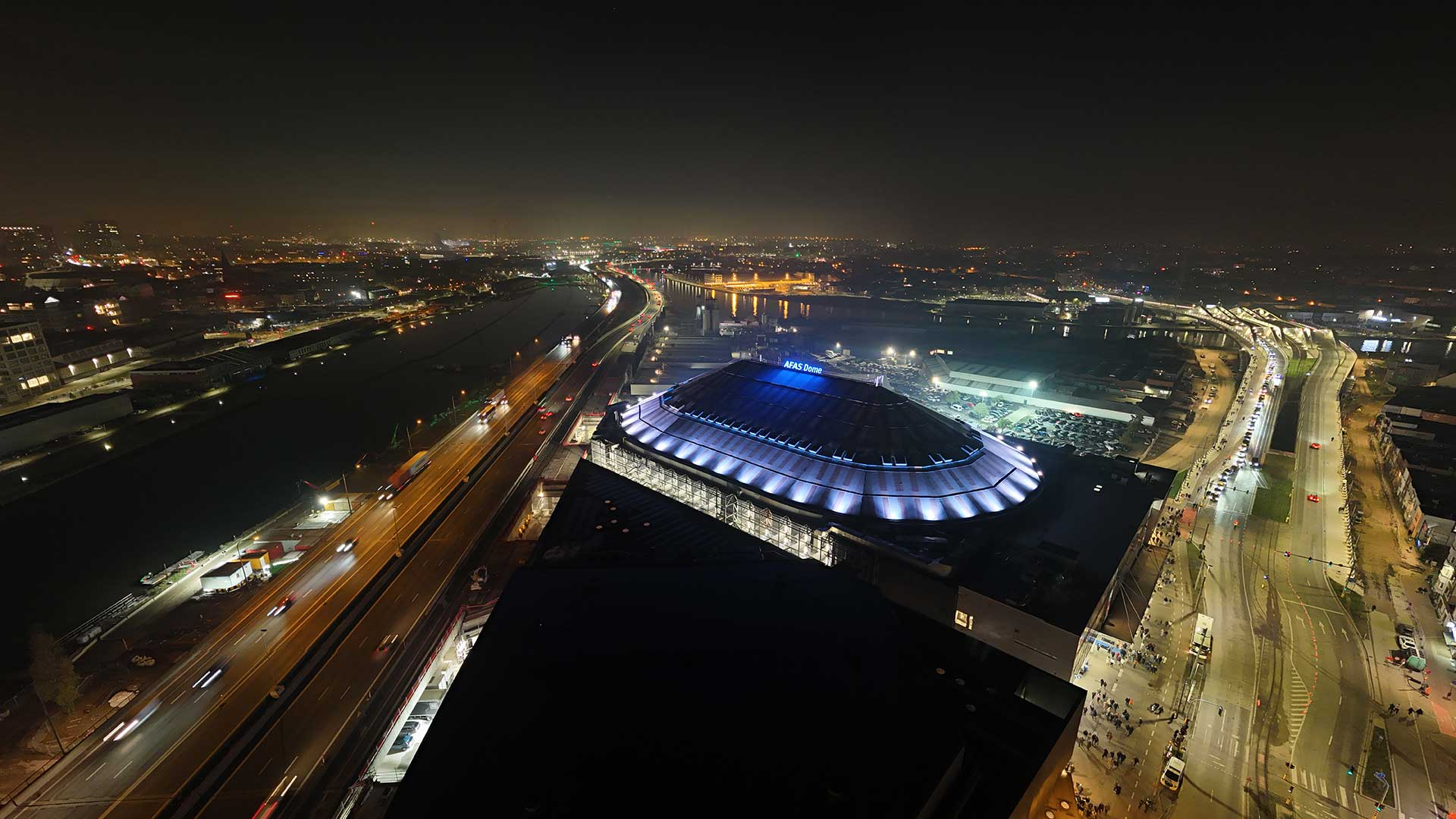
Aerial view of the AFAS Dome in 2026

Construction of the arena started on 11 January 1932. It lasted 21 months and was completed on 11 September 1933, becoming the largest indoor arena in Europe. The Sportpaleis was built by the Apostel-Mampaey family from Boom. They were internationally renowned velodrome builders from 1907 until the Second World War. The velodrome builders of Boom were very much in demand. They built tracks in Gentbrugge (1911), Wilrijk 'Garden City' (1916), Nice and Marseille (1920), Ostend (1921-1946), Brussel-Heizel (1932) and Oudenaarde (1933). The famous 'Kuipke' in Ghent (1922) and the even more famous Sportpaleis in Deurne (1933). In 2008, a book "De velodroombouwers Apostel-Mampaey" was published.

The main building is 132 by 88 metres (433 by 289 ft) and has a roof spanning 11,600 square metres (125,000 sq ft). The arena is elliptical and has two floors. In 2010, the arena's roof was replaced, and during 2011–2013 a €20 million re-development took place, increasing its total capacity from 18,400 to 23,001 (including standing). Until renovations in 2011, there was a 250-metre-long (270 yd) wooden cycling track under the stands.

Next to the AFAS Dome is its sister venue, the Lotto Arena, a hall that can accommodate 8,000 spectators.

On 2 April 2025, it was announced that after 92 years of operation under the same name, the name would be changed to AFAS Dome effective 1 September 2025.

== Events ==
On 29 September 1956, road cycling world champion Stan Ockers died a few days after a crash in his 116th performance at the track. The UCI Track Cycling World Championships were held at the Sportpaleis in 1969 and 2001.

On 19 November 1988, Roy Orbison gave his last European performance at the Sportpaleis.

Janet Jackson was scheduled to perform during her All for You Tour on 29 November 2001, but the show was cancelled along with the rest of her European tour because of possible terrorist threats. The same happened on her 2016 Unbreakable World Tour, but because of scheduling conflicts.

American R&B singer Beyoncé performed at the Sportpaleis as part of her The Beyoncé Experience Tour on 19 May 2007. She returned on 7 May 2009 for her I Am... World Tour and on 14 and 15 May 2013, as part of The Mrs. Carter Show World Tour, where she sold 33,000 tickets in just an hour. The first show on 14 May 2013 was cancelled three hours before the show and rescheduled to 31 May 2013. She subsequently beat her own record by selling 40,000 tickets in under one hour for two 2014 concerts at the venue.

Dutch symphonic metal band Within Temptation celebrated their 15th anniversary with a special show entitled "Elements" at the Sportpaleis. They were accompanied by the renowned Il Novecentro Orchestra and some special guests. The concert was held on 13 November 2012 and was sold out. Part of the concert was later released in the live album Let Us Burn – Elements & Hydra Live in Concert.

On 31 January 2015, the Antwerp Giants beat the attendance record for a basketball game in Belgium. The Belgian Basketball League team's 88–83 win over Spirou Charleroi was attended by 17,135 spectators.

In May 2019, the Final Four of the Basketball Champions League was hosted at the Sportpaleis, with Antwerp Giants being one of the playing teams.

In May 2022, The Major for Counter-Strike Global Offensive was hosted, featuring the world's best teams for one of the biggest esports events marking the first eSports event to be held in the arena.

In 2027, the arena will host the group phase matches for the FIBA Women's EuroBasket.

=== Sporting events ===
Date	Event	Sport/game
30 September–6 October 2013	2013 World Artistic Gymnastics Championships	Artistic Gymnastics
3–5 May 2019	2019 Basketball Champions League Final Four	Basketball
9–22 May 2022	PGL Major Antwerp 2022	Counter-Strike: Global Offensive
30 September–8 October 2023	2023 World Artistic Gymnastics Championships	Artistic Gymnastics
8–11 February 2024	2024 FIBA Women's Olympic Qualifying Tournaments – Antwerp	Basketball
16–27 June 2027	2027 FIBA Women's EuroBasket	Basketball

=== Concerts ===
Many world music stars have performed in this venue, including: 2 Unlimited, AC/DC, Adele, The Alan Parsons Project, Alice Cooper, Alicia Keys, Anastacia, André Rieu, Ariana Grande, Bastille, Beyoncé Knowles, Billie Eilish, The Black Eyed Peas, Bob Dylan, Bon Jovi, Boy George, Britney Spears, Bruce Springsteen, Bruno Mars, Bryan Adams, Celine Dion, Christina Aguilera, Coldplay, Deep Purple, Depeche Mode, Dimitri Vegas & Like Mike, Dua Lipa, The Eagles, Ellie Goulding, Eric Clapton, Faithless, Fleetwood Mac, Gotye, Green Day, Guns N' Roses, Gwen Stefani, Il Divo, Iron Maiden, Janet Jackson, Jean-Michel Jarre, Jennifer Lopez, John Fogerty, Jonas Brothers, Justin Bieber, Kanye West, K3, Katy Perry, Kings of Leon, Kylie Minogue, Lady Gaga, Lana Del Rey, Lenny Kravitz, Leonard Cohen, Lionel Richie, Madonna, Mark Knopfler, Massive Attack, Metallica, Michael Bublé, Mika, Milk Inc., Miley Cyrus, Muse, The Neighbourhood, Neil Diamond, Nick Cave & The Bad Seeds, One Direction, Ozzy Osbourne, Paul McCartney, Pink Floyd, Pink, Placebo, Prince, Queen + Adam Lambert, Queen + Paul Rodgers, Queens of the Stone Age, Rage Against the Machine, Rammstein, Rihanna, Robbie Williams, The Rolling Stones, Roy Orbison, Sade, Santana, Samson en Gert, Scorpions, Shakira, Simply Red, Spice Girls, Sting, Steve Harley and Cockney Rebel (the largest venue the band has ever played), Supertramp, Tiësto, Tina Turner, U2, Whitney Houston, Violetta, Within Temptation and Hans Zimmer.

==== 2011 ====
Date	Main performer(s)	Tour / Concert name	Tickets sold	Total gross notes
30 March	Justin Bieber	My World Tour	13,536 / 13,536 (100%)	$796,566

==== 2013 ====
Date	Main performer(s)	Tour / Concert name	Tickets sold	Total gross notes
10 April	Justin Bieber	Believe Tour	35,751 / 36,939 (97%)	$2,598,300
11 April	Justin Bieber	Believe Tour	35,751 / 36,939 (97%)	$2,598,300
15 May	Beyoncé	The Mrs. Carter Show World Tour	34,785 / 34,793 (99%)	$2,927,440
31 May	Beyoncé	The Mrs. Carter Show World Tour	34,785 / 34,793 (99%)	$2,927,440

==== 2014 ====
Date	Main performer(s)	Tour / Concert name	Tickets sold	Total gross notes
June 20	Miley Cyrus	Bangerz Tour	16,740 / 18,936 (88%)	$1,187,240
20 March	Beyoncé	The Mrs. Carter Show World Tour	36,972 / 36,972 (100%)	$3,489,100
21 March	Beyoncé	The Mrs. Carter Show World Tour	36,972 / 36,972 (100%)	$3,489,100
September 23	Lady Gaga	ArtRave: The Artpop Ball	15,188 / 15,188 (100%)	$1,394,133

==== 2015 ====
Date	Main performer(s)	Tour / Concert name	Tickets sold	Total gross notes
October 18	Violetta	Violetta Live	13,125 / 15,455 (85%)	$977,839

==== 2016 ====
Date	Main performer(s)	Tour / Concert name	Tickets sold	Total gross notes
9 February	Ellie Goulding	Delirium World Tour	19,699 / 20,151 (100%)	$812,320
12 June	Adele	Adele Live 2016	52,130 / 52,130 (100%)	$5,713,100
13 June	Adele	Adele Live 2016	52,130 / 52,130 (100%)	$5,713,100
15 June	Adele	Adele Live 2016	52,130 / 52,130 (100%)	$5,713,100
8 October	Justin Bieber	Purpose World Tour	37,616 / 37,616 (100%)	$2,890,081
9 October	Justin Bieber	Purpose World Tour	37,616 / 37,616 (100%)	$2,890,081

==== 2017 ====
Date	Main performer(s)	Tour / Concert name	Tickets sold	Total gross notes
28 March	Bruno Mars	24K Magic World Tour	42,710 / 43,512 (98%)	$3,156,750
29 March	Bruno Mars	24K Magic World Tour	42,710 / 43,512 (98%)	$3,156,750
5 April	Ed Sheeran	÷ Tour	21,109 / 21,151 (100%)	$1,325,480
22 April	Iron Maiden	The Book of Souls World Tour	19,844 / 19,844 (100%)	$1,323,671
9 May	Depeche Mode	Global Spirit Tour	20,195 / 20,195 (100%)	$1,477,132
1 November	Metallica	WorldWired Tour	45,242 / 45,242 (100%)	$4,411,706
3 November	Metallica	WorldWired Tour	45,242 / 45,242 (100%)	$4,411,706
26 November	Depeche Mode	Global Spirit Tour	19,299 / 19,299 (100%)	$1,544,331

==== 2018 ====
Date	Main performer(s)	Tour / Concert name	Tickets sold	Total gross notes
22 January	Lady Gaga	Joanne World Tour	15,533 / 15,533 (100%)	$1,435,452
16 February	Imagine Dragons	Evolve World Tour	20,272 / 21,372	$954,137
27 February	Kendrick Lamar	The Damn Tour	19,424 / 19,424 (100%)	$1,403,113
16 March	Harry Styles	Harry Styles: Live on Tour	12,156 / 12,156 (100%)	$856,747
17 April	Lana Del Rey	LA to the Moon Tour		
24 May	Katy Perry	Witness: The Tour	15,025 / 21,172 (71%)	$1,255,551
7 June	Shakira	El Dorado World Tour		
29 June	Queen and Adam Lambert	Queen + Adam Lambert Tour 2017-2018		
17 July	Justin Timberlake	The Man of the Woods Tour	34,819 / 34,819 (100%)	$3,191,467
18 July	Justin Timberlake	The Man of the Woods Tour	34,819 / 34,819 (100%)	$3,191,467
15 August	Britney Spears	Piece of Me Tour	17,246 / 19,911 (86%)	$1,399,873
10 October	Shania Twain	Now Tour		
26 October	Oscar and the Wolf	Infinity Tour	28,379 / 31,670 (89%)	$1,308,187
27 October	Oscar and the Wolf	Infinity Tour	28,379 / 31,670 (89%)	$1,308,187

==== 2019 ====
Date	Main performer(s)	Tour / Concert name	Tickets sold	Total gross notes
6 January	André Rieu	Johann Strauss Orchestra	9,634 / 10,996 (88%)	$855,922
19 February	Reverze			
10 March	Shawn Mendes	Shawn Mendes: The Tour	15,879 / 15,879 (100%)	$1,017,923
23 May	Elton John	Farewell Yellow Brick Road	16,348 / 16,348 (100%)	$1,588,629
6 July	Christina Aguilera	X Tour	8,416 / 8,416 (100%)	$547,752
30 August	Ariana Grande	Sweetener World Tour	20,720 / 21,826 (88%)	$1,366,100
27 September	Little Mix	LM5: The Tour	13,397 / 13,397 (100%)	$717,803
28 September	Cher	Here We Go Again Tour	10,192 / 10,924 (94%)	$1,114,603

==== 2020 ====
Date	Main performer(s)	Tour / Concert name	Tickets sold	Total gross notes
2 February	Sabaton	The Great Tour		

==== 2021 ====
Date	Main performer(s)	Tour / Concert name	Tickets sold	Total gross notes
2 June	Kiss	End of the Road World Tour	Rescheduled	
9 June	Eric Clapton	Summer 2021 European Tour	Canceled	
27 June	Iron Maiden	Legacy of the Beast World Tour	Canceled	
30 October	Regi	Komt wat dichterbij		
27 November	Niels Destadsbader	Sterker		
28 November	Niels Destadsbader	Sterker		
29 November	Niels Destadsbader	Sterker		

==== 2022 ====
Date	Main performer(s)	Tour / Concert name	Tickets sold	Total gross notes
9 April	LikeMe	LikeMe On Tour (4 shows)		
23 April	The War On Drugs	I Don't Live Here Anymore		
24 April	Hans Zimmer	EU Tour 2022		
6 May	Dua Lipa	Future Nostalgia Tour	42,550 / 42,550 (100%)	$2,241,927
7 May	Dua Lipa	Future Nostalgia Tour	42,550 / 42,550 (100%)	$2,241,927
13 May	Tool	Tool in Concert 2022		
6 June	Kiss	End of the Road World Tour		
12 June	Eric Clapton	Summer 2022 European Tour		
15 June	Alicia Keys	Alicia + Keys World Tour		
16 June	50 Cent	Tour 2022		
21 June	Green Day; Fall Out Boy; Weezer	Hella Mega Tour		
28 June	Billie Eilish	Happier Than Ever, The World Tour	20,793 / 20,793 (100%)	$1,472,283
7 July	Harry Styles	Love On Tour	18,245 / 18,245 (100%)	$1,207,376
15 July	Queen + Adam Lambert	The Rhapsody Tour		
27 October	Kendrick Lamar	The Big Steppers Tour	17,624 / 17,624 (100%)	$1,314,179
23 November	The Cure	Lost World Tour		
8 December	Volbeat	Servant of The Road World Tour		

==== 2023 ====
Date	Main performer(s)	Tour / Concert name	Tickets sold	Total gross notes
26 January	Robbie Williams	XXV Tour		
24 February	Lizzo	The Special Tour	10,677 / 11,305	$626,180
14 May	Roger Waters	This Is Not A Drill		
20 May	Depeche Mode	Memento Mori World Tour	16,668 / 16,668 (100%)	$1,668,464
13 July	Iron Maiden	The Future Past Tour		
17 September	Celine Dion	Courage World Tour		
18 September	Celine Dion	Courage World Tour		
20 September	Celine Dion	Courage World Tour		
21 October	Madonna	The Celebration Tour		
22 October	Madonna	The Celebration Tour		
12 November	Queens of the Stone Age	The End is Nero Tour		

==== 2024 ====
Date	Main performer(s)	Tour / Concert name	Tickets sold	Total gross notes
21 May	Olivia Rodrigo	Guts World Tour		
22 May	Olivia Rodrigo	Guts World Tour		
5 April	Simple Minds	2024 Global Tour		
8 June	Jonas Brothers	Five Albums. One Night. The World Tour		
9 July	Travis Scott	Circus Maximus Tour		
3 August	Justin Timberlake	The Forget Tomorrow World Tour		
4 August	Justin Timberlake	The Forget Tomorrow World Tour		
3 October	Janet Jackson	Janet Jackson: Together Again		

==== 2025 ====
Date	Main performer(s)	Tour / Concert name	Tickets sold	Total gross notes
2 January	Clouseau	Clouseau 40		
3 January	Clouseau	Clouseau 40		
4 January	Clouseau	Clouseau 40		
9 January	Clouseau	Clouseau 40		
10 January	Clouseau	Clouseau 40		
12 January	André Rieu			
17 January	Clouseau	Clouseau 40		
18 January	Clouseau	Clouseau 40		
19 January	Clouseau	Clouseau 40		
14, 15 March	Oscar and the Wolf			
26 March	Lenny Kravitz	Blue Electric Light Tour		
1 April	Limp Bizkit			
22 April	Ghost			
25 April	Tyler, the Creator	Chromakopia: The World Tour	Sold Out	
26 April	Antwerp Philharmonic Orchestra			
14 May	Tate McRae	Miss Possessive Tour		
9 June	Duran Duran	Europe 2025		
10 June	Ado	Hibana World Tour		
11 June	Dua Lipa	Radical Optimism Tour	57.721 / 57.721	$6 269 627
12 June	Dua Lipa	Radical Optimism Tour	57.721 / 57.721	$6 269 627
13 June	Dua Lipa	Radical Optimism Tour	57.721 / 57.721	$6 269 627
14 June	Pitbull	Party After Dark		
18 June	Lionel Richie			
25 June	John Fogerty	The Celebration Tour		
26 June	Santana	Oneness Tour		
1 July	Kylie Minogue	Tension Tour		
8 August	Drake	Some Special Shows 4 U		
24 September	Volbeat	Greatest of All Tours Worldwide		
3 October	K3	K3 Originals: de Reünie		
4 October (Note: There were two shows on this date.)	K3	K3 Originals: de Reünie		
5 October	K3	K3 Originals: de Reünie		
6 October	K3	K3 Originals: de Reünie		
7 October	K3	K3 Originals: de Reünie		
8 October	K3	K3 Originals: de Reünie		
9 October	K3	K3 Originals: de Reünie		
10 October	K3	K3 Originals: de Reünie		
11 October	K3	K3 Originals: de Reünie		
12 October	K3	K3 Originals: de Reünie		
16 October	Katy Perry	The Lifetimes Tour		
24 October	Regi Penxten, Milk Inc.	Regi vs. Milk Inc.		
25 October	Regi Penxten, Milk Inc.	Regi vs. Milk Inc.		
31 October	Metejoor	Metejoor 2025		
1 November	Metejoor	Metejoor 2025		
2 November	Till Lindemann	Meine Welt Tour		
8 November	Benson Boone	American Heart World Tour		
11 November	Lady Gaga	The Mayhem Ball		
12 November	Simply Red	40th Anniversary Tour		
13 November	Mumford & Sons			
15 November	Jan Smit	Live in het Sportpaleis		
2 December	Sabaton	The Legendary Tour		
4 December	Tom Odell	The Wonderful Life Tour		
12 December	Guus Meeuwis	Live in het Sportpaleis		

==== 2026 ====
Date	Main performer(s)	Tour / Concert name	Tickets sold	Total gross notes
11 January	André Rieu			
1 February	Raye	This Tour May Contain New Music		
23 February	Florence + The Machine	The Everybody Scream Tour		
19 March	Hans Zimmer	The Next Level Live		
27 March	Andrea Bocelli			
7 April	5 Seconds of Summer	Everyone's a Star! World Tour		
18 April	Alex Warren	Little Orphan Alex Live		
23 April	Pommelien Thijs			
24 April	Pommelien Thijs			
25 April	Pommelien Thijs			
26 April	Eric Clapton			
27 April	Rosalía	Lux Tour		
28 April	Pentatonix			
30 April	Pommelien Thijs			
1 May	Pommelien Thijs			
5 May	Tame Impala	Deadbeat Tour		
13 May	The Neighbourhood	Ultrasound Tour		
15 May	Conan Gray	Wishbone World Tour		
17 May	Ne-Yo and Akon			
21 May	K3	K3 Originals: de Reünie		
22 May	K3	K3 Originals: de Reünie		
23 May	K3	K3 Originals: de Reünie		
24 May	K3	K3 Originals: de Reünie		
25 May	K3	K3 Originals: de Reünie		
27 May	K3	K3 Originals: de Reünie		
28 May	K3	K3 Originals: de Reünie		
29 May	K3	K3 Originals: de Reünie		
30 May	K3	K3 Originals: de Reünie		
31 May	K3	K3 Originals: de Reünie		
3 June	K3	K3 Originals: de Reünie		
4 June	K3	K3 Originals: de Reünie		
5 June	K3	K3 Originals: de Reünie		
6 June	K3	K3 Originals: de Reünie		
7 June	K3	K3 Originals: de Reünie		
28 June	Guns N' Roses	World Tour 2026		
15 September	Katseye	The Wildworld Tour		
18 September	The Pussycat Dolls	PCD Forever Tour		
8 October	Alex Agnew	No More Heroes		
9 October	Alex Agnew	No More Heroes		
10 October	Alex Agnew	No More Heroes		
15 October	Bryan Adams			
17 October	J. Cole			
23 October	Milk Inc.	Forever Tour		
24 October	Milk Inc.	Forever Tour		
1 November	Placebo			
5 November	Niall Horan	Dinner Party: Live on Tour		
9 November	Korn			
12 November	Fontaines D.C.			

==== 2027 ====
Date	Main performer(s)	Tour / Concert name	Tickets sold	Total gross notes
10 January	André Rieu			
31 January	Nothing But Thieves			
10 March	Manowar	Kings of metal fighting the world tour		
26 March	Teddy Swims	The Ugly Tour		
27 March	Teddy Swims	The Ugly Tour		
15 April	Gracie Abrams	The Look at My Life Tour		
16 April	Gracie Abrams	The Look at My Life Tour		
29 April	Hans Zimmer	The World of Hans Zimmer		
5 May	Metejoor			
16 May	Sombr	You Are the Reason Tour		
5 July	Toto	50th Anniversary Tour		

== Audience ==
Billboard Magazine said the Sportpaleis was the second most visited event hall in the world between November 2007 and November 2008, with 1,239,436 visitors. Only Madison Square Garden in New York had more.

The arena can hold 23,001 people (including standing) after re-development which took place from 2011 to 2013.

== Transport connections ==
The AFAS Dome lies at the R. Grégoirplein square at the crossing of two large traffic axes, the Bisschoppenhoflaan/Schijnpoortweg, having an east–west orientation, and the Burgemeester Gabriel Theunisbrug, going north over the Albert Canal. In its immediate proximity also lies the Deurne highway ramp of the R1 ring road, as well as the Singel urban ring road. Also, nearby lie three car parks operated by the Sportpaleis, and two more car parks, of a nearby Gamma shop and the Antwerp slaughterhouse, which are also available when large events are held. Even so, traffic near the AFAS Dome can get extremely dense when such events are held, leading to large traffic jams and causing a nuisance with the inhabitants of the neighbourhood.

The AFAS Dome is also well connected to the Antwerp public transport system. Underground, next to the AFAS Dome, lies Sport premetro station, which is serviced by tram routes 2, 3 and 6, running between either Luchtbal or Merksem to the north and the city centre and the western or southern parts of the city in the other direction, via the Antwerp premetro network. Above ground also lies the terminus of tram route 12, following an above-ground trajectory toward the city centre and Zuid neighbourhood to the south. In addition to these, tram route 5 also has a stop called "Sportpaleis" near the premetro exit at the Ten Eekhovelei to the south of the complex. The route runs between Deurne and Wijnegem to the east and the city centre and Linkeroever to the west. Finally, it is also serviced by bus lines 19 and 413.

== See also ==
- List of cycling tracks and velodromes
- List of indoor arenas in Belgium
- List of tennis stadiums by capacity

== Notes ==
Preceded by Olympic Velodrome; Rome	UCI Track Cycling World Championships; Venue; 1969	Succeeded by Saffron Lane; Leicester
Preceded by Manchester Velodrome; Manchester	UCI Track Cycling World Championships; Venue; 2001	Succeeded by Siemens Arena; Ballerup, Copenhagen
Preceded by Tokyo Metropolitan Gymnasium; Tokyo, Japan	World Artistic Gymnastics Championships; Venue; 2013	Succeeded by Guangxi Gymnasium; Nanning, China
