= Hallo K3 =

Single by K3

from the album Eyo!
- Released: 15 September 2010
- Recorded: 2010
- Genre: Pop
- Label: Studio 100
- Songwriter(s): Miquel Wiels, A. Putte, P. Gillis
- Producer(s): Studio 100

K3 singles chronology
"Handjes Draaien" (2010)	"Hallo K3" (2010)	"Higher" (2011)

"Hallo K3" is the first single to be released from Flemish/Dutch girl group K3's eleventh studio album Eyo!. It was written by Miquel Wiels, A. Putte, P. Gillis, and produced by Studio 100. The song is also the intro for the same-named K3 sitcom Hallo K3.

== Track listing ==
1. Hallo K3
2. Hallo K3 (Instrumental)

== Charts ==
=== Weekly charts ===
Chart (2010)	Peak position
Belgium (Ultratop 50 Flanders)	2
Netherlands (Single Top 100)	11

=== Year-end charts ===
Chart (2010)	Position
Belgium (Ultratop Flanders)	76
