= K3 en het Magische Medaillon =

2004 film

K3 en het Magisch Medaillon
- Theatrical release poster
- Directed by: Indra Siera
- Written by: Hans Bourlon, Danny Verbiest
- Starring: Kathleen Aerts; Karen Damen kristel Verbeke
- Music by: K3
- Production company: Studio 100
- Distributed by: Independent Films (Netherlands); Kinepolis (Belgium)
- Release date: 29 September 2004
- Running time: 75 minutes (including aftertitles)
- Countries: Belgium; Netherlands
- Language: Dutch

K3 en het Magische Medaillon (English: K3 and the Magical Medallion) is a 2004 children's comedy film starring girl band K3 – Kathleen Aerts, Karen Damen and Kristel Verbeke – in their first full-length theater film.

== Plot ==
Gazpacho, a high-ranking criminal, orders his henchmen, Red Tiger and Black Panther, to steal the medallion that can make wishes come true. It once belonged to the Egyptian Pharaoh Washabi after which it is named. An explorer found it before the goons could and hid it in his house. However, the house had just been sold to K3 and the girls knew nothing about the medallion or its powers. When they do finally find it, they notice the strange powers. Meanwhile, Red Tiger and Black Panther are still trying to get the piece to make their own (bad) wishes come true.

The evil villains are blundering idiots and the three girls wishes are very simple and benign so the idiots are no match for the girls just like in any number of other children's movies and good of course triumphs over evil.

Numerous inside-joke references are present regarding their other work and works-in-progress up to that time, so that is a little amusing for the adult set.

== Cast ==
=== Main ===
- Kathleen Aerts...Kathleen
- Karen Damen...Karen
- Kristel Verbeke...Kristel

=== Supporting ===
- Paul de Leeuw...The Ghost (from the Medaillon)
- Eddy Vereycken...Red Tiger
- Daisy Ip...Black Panter
- Peter Rouffaer...Gazpacho
- Tom De Hoog...Police officer
- Angele De Backer...La Mama (Gazapacho's mother)
- Nicolas Vander Biest...Halewijn Van Helewout

=== Minor ===
- Nadja Schrauwen
- Ilke Siera
- André van Cleemput-Wils
- Annie van Cleemput-Wils

== DVD ==
The Video DVD was released in early 2005.
