= Hallo K3 (TV series) =

Belgian children's television series

- Created by: Gert Verhulst
- Starring: K3
- Theme music composer: Miquel Wiels
- Opening theme: "Hallo K3" sung by K3
- Countries of origin: Belgium; Netherlands
- Original language: Dutch
- No. of seasons: 3 (renewed for a second season)
- No. of episodes: 13 (aired) (list of episodes)

Production
- Camera setup: Videotape (filmized); Multi-camera
- Running time: approx. 22–23 and ½ minutes
- Production company: Studio 100

Original release
- Network: Vtm Kzoom
- Release: 6 October 2010 – 20 November 2012

Hallo K3 is a Studio 100 comedy television series, created by Gert Verhulst, that follows the experiences of pop trio and best friends K3, portrayed by Karen Damen, Kristel Verbeke and Josje Huisman try to live in their apartment and trying to find a balance between being a pop star and live a normal life which turns out to be not so easy. The series debuted on 6 October 2010. This is the first Studio 100 Original Series to be shot and aired in high-definition from the beginning; it is shot on tape, but uses a "filmized" appearance.

== Characters ==
=== Main characters ===
- Karen Damen as Karen-A fun loving, goofy, wacky, funny girl who buys an apartment to live in with her two best friends, she is the oldest one but sometimes doesn't act real mature. She loves Belgian fries, buy shoes and is addicted to her favourite soap "Good Weather, Bad Weather". She sometimes acts dumb for trying to be funny, but inside she is actually very smart. She mostly falls in love with every guy she meets and also for Bas her hot neighbour.
- Josje Huisman as Josje—A friendly, kind and sometimes naive girl who always sees the best in everyone and sometimes acts like a real dumb blonde. The first time she meets her neighbour Bas she immediately falls in love with him and tries everything to impress him. She is a real animal friend and always tries to help everyone.
- Kristel Verbeke as Kristel—A smart, mature, calm, but goodhearted girl who also likes Bas but not much as Karen and Josje. She has a cleaning obsession. She comes up with a non-flirting-pact which means that all three girls will not separately date Bas because this may ruin their friendship. in the last episode she and Karen let Josje date Bas after they see how much Josje is in love with him.
- Jacques Vermeire as Marcel—An old and geeky grandpa who always tries to help the girl whenever they need but he mostly can't fix it because he's a kinda of clumsy. He has a little crush on Josje but he doesn't say that. He has a Siamese cat named Suzy who makes really loud farts. He is a huge fan of The Little Mermaid (1989 film).
- Metta Gramberg as Rosie—A nice and friendly bartender and owner of The Rosebottle who is always there for the girls with a good advice. She isn't very feminine and doesn't like dresses. She acts sometimes very sarcastic towards Marcel but she does consider him as a friend.
- Winston Post as Bas—A sweet, friendly, shy neighbour who lives in the same building as Karenm Kristel and Josje. he is described as a superhunk but he doesn't call himself that. He knows that the girls like him but he doesn't flirt back, only sometimes.

== Production ==
On a local Belgian radio station Kristel Verbeke said they would be starring in their very first and own television sitcom. they started filming in the summer of 2010.

== Episodes ==
Seasons		Episodes	First air date	Last air date
1	13	6 October 2010	29 December 2011	
2	13	October 2011	March 2012	
3	14	November 2012	November 2012	

== International release ==
Country / Region	Channel	Premiere		
Belgium	Vtm Kzoom 6 October 2010	Netherlands	Z@pp	2 April 2011
