= Kuma hé (song) =

"Kuma Hé"

Single by K3

from the album Kuma Hé
- Released: 2 July 2005
- Recorded: 2005
- Genre: Pop
- Length: 3:20
- Label: Studio 100
- Songwriter(s): Miquel Wiels, A. Putte, P. Gillis
- Producer(s): Studio 100

K3 singles chronology
"Zou er iemand op zijn op Mars?" (2004)	"Kuma Hé" (2005)	"Borst vooruit" (2005)

"Kuma Hé" is the first single to be released from Flemish/Dutch girl group K3's seventh studio album Kuma Hé. It was written by Miquel Wiels, A. Putte, P. Gillis, and produced by Studio 100. The song premiered in July 2005, it premiered on the kids TV channel Ketnet. The song became a huge summer hit in the Netherlands and Belgium. The song reached nr. 1 in the Netherlands and in Belgium nr. 2.

== Music video ==
The video shows the girls dance in very colorful outfits in a kind of Africa vibe.

== Charts ==
=== Weekly charts ===
Chart (2005)	Peak position
Belgium (Ultratop 50 Flanders)	2
Netherlands (Dutch Top 40)	2
Netherlands (Single Top 100)	1

=== Year-end charts ===
Chart (2005)	Position
Belgium (Ultratop Flanders)	8
Netherlands (Dutch Top 40)	70
Netherlands (Single Top 100)	21
