= Helmut Lotti =

Belgian tenor and singer-songwriter (born 1969)

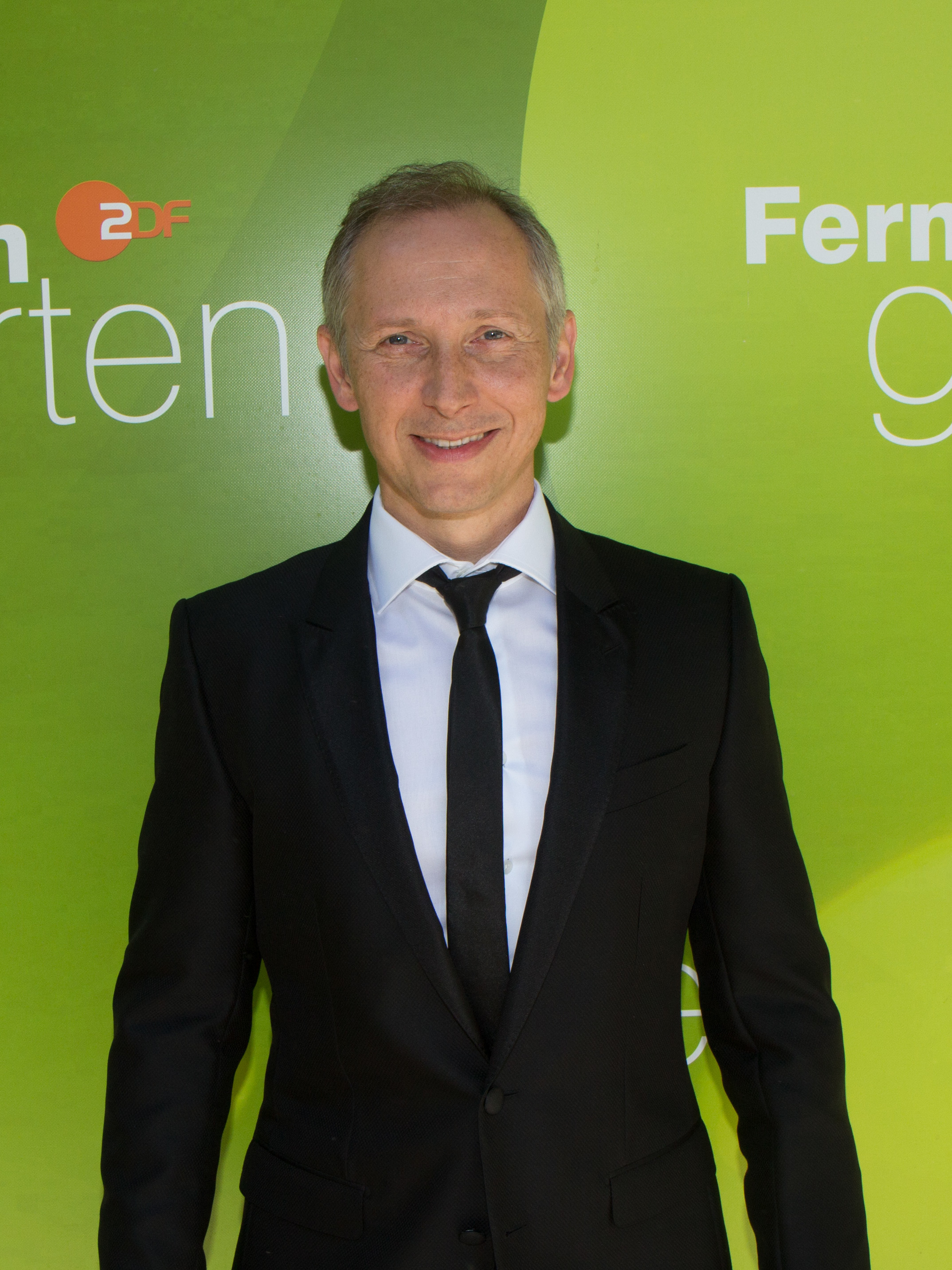
- Lotti in 2018

Background information
- Born: Helmut Barthold Johannes Alma Lotigiers; 22 October 1969 (age 57); Ghent, Belgium
- Genres: Classical, pop, rock & roll, easy listening
- Occupation: Singer-songwriter
- Years active: 1988–present
- Label: Piet Roelen Productions
- Website: www.helmutlotti.be

Helmut Lotti (born Helmut Barthold Johannes Alma Lotigiers; 22 October 1969), is a Belgian tenor and singer-songwriter. Lotti performs in several styles and languages. Once an Elvis impersonator, he has sung African and Latino and Jewish music hit records, and he crossed over into classical music in the 1990s. In 2023 he brought a selection of his favourite Heavy Metal songs at Graspop Metal Meeting.

== Life and music ==
The son of Luc and Rita (née Lagrou), Helmut Barthold Johannes Alma Lotigiers was born in Ghent, Belgium, and began his singing career with a visual and singing style in an obvious imitation of Elvis Presley, and was described as "De Nieuwe Elvis" (in Dutch) or "The New Elvis". His first two albums were Vlaamse Nachten ("Flemish Nights", 1990) and Alles Wat Ik Voel (All That I Feel, 1992). After a few more albums, he changed direction in 1995 with the first of what became a long series of "Helmut Lotti Goes Classic" albums, which proved to increase his popularity. Since 2000 he has also made successful recordings in traditional Latino, African and Russian-style music.

Lotti sings in his native language Dutch, as well as Afrikaans, English, French, German, Hebrew, Italian, Latin, Russian, Spanish, Ukrainian, Zulu, Xhosa, Ndebele and others. He has sold over 13 million albums worldwide.

Lotti does volunteer work as an ambassador for UNICEF. Lotti took part in the 0110 concerts against racism, organised by Tom Barman.

He was married and divorced three times and has one daughter. Lotti was diagnosed with autism as an adult.

== Discography ==
Year	Title	Sales	Certifications
1990	Vlaamse Nachten / Flemish Nights		
1992	Alles wat ik voel / All That I Feel		
1993	Memories		BEL: Platinum
1994	Just for You		BEL: Gold
1995	Helmut Lotti Goes Classic	BEL: 600,000; CAN: 202,000; NED: 50,000; WW: 1,000,000	AUT: Platinum; BEL: 12× Platinum; CAN: 2× Platinum; FRA: Gold; GER: Gold; NED: 2× Platinum; SWE: Platinum; SUI: Gold
1996	Helmut Lotti Goes Classic II	BEL: 500,000; CAN: 87,000	AUT: Platinum; BEL: 10× Platinum; CAN: Gold; GER: Gold; SWE: Gold; SUI: Gold
1997	Helmut Lotti Goes Classic III	BEL & GER: 455,000; CAN: 47,000	AUT: Gold; BEL: 7× Platinum; CAN: Gold; GER: Platinum; NED: Gold
1998	Romantic		BEL: Platinum; GER: Gold
1998	Helmut Lotti Goes Classic Final Edition		BEL: 4× Platinum
1998	A Classical Christmas with Helmut Lotti		
1999	Romantic 2		GER: Gold
1999	Out of Africa		AUT: Gold; BEL: 3× Platinum; GER: 3× Gold; NED: Platinum; SUI: Gold
2000	Vlaamse hits / Flemish hits		
2000	Latino Classics		AUT: Gold; BEL: 3× Platinum; GER: Platinum; NED: Platinum; SUI: Gold
2001	Latino Love Songs		AUT: Gold; BEL: Platinum; GER: Gold; SUI: Gold
2002	My Tribute to the King	Europe: 600,000	AUT: Platinum; BEL: 2× Platinum; BVMI: 3× Gold; NVPI: Gold; SWE: Gold; SUI: Gold
2003	Pop Classics in Symphony		AUT: Gold; BEL: Platinum; GER: Platinum; SUI: Gold
2004	From Russia with Love		AUT: Gold; BEL: Platinum; GER: Gold
2006	Meine geliebte Klassik / My Favorite Classics		
2006	The Crooners		AUT: Gold; BEL: Platinum; GER: Gold
2008	Time to Swing		BEL: Platinum
2013	Mijn Hart & Mijn Lijf		
2015	Faith, Hope & Love		
2016	The Comeback Album		
2018	Soul Classics in Symphony		BEL: Platinum
2021	Italian Songbook		
2023	Hellmut Lotti Goes Metal		
