= Loko le =

Studio album by K3
- Released: 22 November 2013
- Recorded: 2013
- Genre: Pop
- Length: 41:40
- Label: Studio 100
- Producer: Miguel Wiels; Peter Gillis

K3 chronology
Engeltjes (2012)	Loko le (2013)	10.000 luchtballonnen (2015)

Singles from Loko le
- 1. "Koning Willem-Alexander" Released: 15 April 2013; 2. "Eya hoya!" Released: 10 June 2013; 3. "Loko le" Released: 14 October 2013

Loko le is the thirteenth studio album by the Belgian-Dutch girlgroup K3. The album was released on 22 November 2013 through label Studio 100. Three singles were released to promote the album: "Koning Willem-Alexander" (a remake of their 2012 single "Willem-Alexander"), "Eya hoya!" and "Loko le". Loko le reached the top five in both the Flemish and Dutch album charts.

== Track list ==
Loko le – Standard edition
No.	Title	Writer(s)	Producer(s)	Length
1.	"Loko le"	Miguel Wiels; Peter Gillis; Tracy Atkins	Wiels; Gillis	3:30
2.	"Eya hoya!"	Wiels; Gillis; Atkins	Wiels; Gillis	3:56
3.	"Viva viool"	Wiels; Gillis; Alain Vande Putte	Wiels; Gillis	3:36
4.	"Kusje van jou"	Wiels; Gillis; Vande Putte	Wiels; Gillis	3:19
5.	"Drums gaan boem"	Wiels; Gillis; Vande Putte	Wiels; Gillis	3:00
6.	"En ik dans"	Wiels; Gillis; Vande Putte	Wiels; Gillis	3:38
7.	"Alleen door jou"	Wiels; Gillis; Vande Putte	Wiels; Gillis	3:26
8.	"Ik wil niet naar huis gaan"	Wiels; Gillis; Vande Putte	Wiels; Gillis	3:38
9.	"Het steltenlied"	Wiels; Gillis; Vande Putte	Wiels; Gillis	3:45
10.	"Wat jij doet met mij"	Wiels; Gillis; Vande Putte	Wiels; Gillis	3:15
11.	"Kitty"	Wiels; Gillis; Vande Putte	Wiels; Gillis	3:02
12.	"Kinderen baas"	Wiels; Gillis; Vande Putte	Wiels; Gillis	3:35
Total length:				41:40

Loko le – Standard edition bonus track
No.	Title	Writer(s)	Producer(s)	Length
13.	"Koning Willem-Alexander"	Wiels; Gillis; Vande Putte	Wiels; Gillis	3:15
Total length:				44:55

== Chart performance ==
=== Weekly charts ===
Chart (2013)	Peak position
Belgian Albums (Ultratop Flanders)	4
Dutch Albums (Album Top 100)	4

=== Year-end charts ===
Chart (2013)	Position
Belgian Albums (Ultratop Flanders)	43
Dutch Albums (Album Top 100)	36

Chart (2014)	Position
Belgian Albums (Ultratop Flanders)	12
Dutch Albums (Album Top 100)	54

== Certifications ==
Region	Certification	Certified units/sales
Belgium (BRMA)	Gold	10,000^{*}
^{*} Sales figures based on certification alone.
