= Engeltjes =

Studio album by K3
- Released: 23 November 2012
- Recorded: 2012
- Genre: Pop
- Length: 40:15
- Label: Studio 100
- Producer: Miguel Wiels; Peter Gillis

K3 chronology
Eyo! (2011)	Engeltjes (2012)	Loko le (2013)

Singles from Engeltjes
- 1. "Waar zijn die engeltjes" Released: 23 June 2012; 2. "Zeg eens AAA" Released: 2013; 3. "Parapluutje" Released: 2013

Engeltjes (English: Angels) is the twelfth studio album by the Belgian-Dutch girlgroup K3. The album was released on 23 November 2012 through label Studio 100. Three singles were released to promote the album: "Waar zijn die engeltjes", "Zeg eens AAA" and "Parapluutje". Engeltjes reached the peak position in the Dutch album charts.

== Track list ==
Engeltjes – Standard edition
No.	Title	Writer(s)	Producer(s)	Length
1.	"Waar zijn die engeltjes"	Miguel Wiels; Peter Gillis; Tracy Atkins	Wiels; Gillis	3:30
2.	"Zeg eens AAA"	Wiels; Gillis; Alain Vande Putte	Wiels; Gillis	3:04
3.	"Parapluutje"	Wiels; Gillis; Vande Putte	Wiels; Gillis	3:10
4.	"Mama kan alles"	Wiels; Gillis; Vande Putte	Wiels; Gillis	3:20
5.	"Vind ik leuk"	Wiels; Gillis; Vande Putte	Wiels; Gillis	3:22
6.	"Leugentje leugentje"	Wiels; Gillis; Vande Putte	Wiels; Gillis	2:47
7.	"Wie zal ik een kusje geven"	Wiels; Gillis; Vande Putte	Wiels; Gillis	3:20
8.	"Niet normaal"	Wiels; Gillis; Vande Putte	Wiels; Gillis	3:31
9.	"Gigaleuke dag"	Wiels; Gillis; Vande Putte	Wiels; Gillis	3:18
10.	"Jurkje"	Wiels; Gillis; Vande Putte	Wiels; Gillis	3:52
11.	"Zwaai als je verliefd bent"	Wiels; Gillis; Vande Putte	Wiels; Gillis	3:23
12.	"Mijn liefje achterna"	Wiels; Gillis; Vande Putte	Wiels; Gillis	3:38
Total length:				40:15

== Personnel ==
Credits for Engeltjes adapted from fan site.

- Tracy Atkins – text, music
- Allard Buwalda – saxophone
- Karen Damen – vocals
- Peter Gillis – text, music, production
- Serge Hertoge – guitars
- Josje Huisman – vocals
- Jel Jongen – trombone
- Serge Plume – trumpet
- Uwe Teichtert – mastering
- Pallieter Van Buggenhout – guitars
- Alain Vande Putte – text, music
- Kristel Verbeke – vocals
- Ronny Verbiest – accordion
- Miguel Wiels – text, music, keyboards, production

== Chart performance ==
=== Weekly charts ===
Chart (2012)	Peak position
Belgian Albums (Ultratop Flanders)	2
Dutch Albums (Album Top 100)	1

=== Year-end charts ===
Chart (2012)	Position
Belgian Albums Chart (Flanders)	39
Dutch Albums Chart	30
Chart (2013)	Position
Belgian Albums Chart (Flanders)	28
Dutch Albums Chart	33

== Certifications ==
Region	Certification	Certified units/sales
Belgium (BEA)	Platinum	20,000^{*}
Netherlands (NVPI)	Platinum	50,000^{^}
^{*} Sales figures based on certification alone.^{^} Shipments figures based on certification alone.
