= Eyo! =

Studio album by K3
- Released: 18 November 2011
- Genre: Pop
- Length: 39:40
- Label: Studio 100
- Producer: Miguel Wiels; Peter Gillis

K3 chronology
MaMaSé! (2009)	Eyo! (2011)	Engeltjes (2012)

Singles from Eyo!
- 1. "Hallo K3" Released: 15 September 2010; 2. "Eyo!" Released: 31 October 2011; 3. "Willem-Alexander" Released: 2 February 2012

Eyo! is the eleventh studio album by the Belgian-Dutch girlgroup K3. The album was released on 18 November 2011 through label Studio 100. Three singles were released to promote the album: "Hallo K3", "Eyo!" and "Willem-Alexander". Eyo! reached the peak position in both the Dutch and Flemish album charts.

== Track listing ==
Eyo! – Standard edition
No.	Title	Writer(s)	Producer(s)	Length
1.	"Eyo!"	Miguel Wiels; Peter Gillis; Tracy Atkins	Wiels; Gillis	3:30
2.	"Hallo K3"	Wiels; Gillis; Alain Vande Putte	Wiels; Gillis	2:47
3.	"Willem-Alexander"	Wiels; Gillis; Vande Putte	Wiels; Gillis	3:13
4.	"Smoorverliefd"	Wiels; Gillis; Vande Putte	Wiels; Gillis	3:19
5.	"K3-Airlines"	Wiels; Gillis; Vande Putte	Wiels; Gillis	3:44
6.	"Beroemd"	Wiels; Gillis; Vande Putte	Wiels; Gillis	3:03
7.	"Meiden van de brandweer"	Wiels; Gillis; Vande Putte	Wiels; Gillis	3:12
8.	"Verstoppertje"	Wiels; Gillis; Vande Putte	Wiels; Gillis	2:48
9.	"Telepathie"	Wiels; Gillis; Vande Putte	Wiels; Gillis	3:46
10.	"Dubbeldekkertrein"	Wiels; Gillis; Vande Putte	Wiels; Gillis	3:22
11.	"Bel me ringeling"	Wiels; Gillis; Vande Putte	Wiels; Gillis	3:26
12.	"Cowboys en indianen"	Wiels; Gillis; Vande Putte	Wiels; Gillis	3:30
Total length:				39:40

== Chart performance ==
=== Weekly charts ===
Chart (2011)	Peak position
Belgian Albums (Ultratop Flanders)	1
Dutch Albums (Album Top 100)	1

=== Year-end charts ===
Chart (2011)	Position
Belgian Albums Chart (Flanders)	36
Dutch Albums Chart	23
Chart (2012)	Position
Belgian Albums Chart (Flanders)	30
Dutch Albums Chart	58

== Certifications ==
Region	Certification	Certified units/sales
Belgium (BEA)	Platinum	20,000^{*}
Netherlands (NVPI)	Platinum	50,000^{^}
^{*} Sales figures based on certification alone.^{^} Shipments figures based on certification alone.
