= Kuma hé =

Studio album by K3
- Released: 3 October 2005
- Recorded: 2005
- Genre: Pop
- Length: 42:10
- Label: Studio 100
- Producer: Miguel Wiels; Peter Gillis

K3 chronology
De wereld rond (2004)	Kuma hé (2005)	Ya ya yippee (2006)

2009 reissue album cover

Singles from Kuma hé
- 1. "Kuma hé" Released: 27 June 2005; 2. "Borst vooruit" Released: 5 September 2005

Kuma hé is the seventh studio album by the Belgian girlgroup K3. The album was released on 3 October 2005 through label Studio 100. Two singles were released from the album: "Kuma hé" and "Borst vooruit". Kuma hé reached the peak position in both the Flemish and Dutch album charts. In 2009, a reissue of the album was released, which contains the original songs as well as karaoke versions.

== Track listing ==
Kuma hé – Standard edition
No.	Title	Writer(s)	Length
1.	"Kuma hé"	Miguel Wiels; Peter Gillis; Alain Vande Putte	3:30
2.	"Borst vooruit"	Wiels; Gillis; Vande Putte	3:21
3.	"Shakalaka"	Wiels; Gillis; Vande Putte	3:39
4.	"Antwoordapparaat"	Wiels; Gillis; Vande Putte	3:38
5.	"Alle baby's"	Wiels; Gillis; Vande Putte	3:36
6.	"Zonnestraaltje"	Wiels; Gillis; Vande Putte	3:17
7.	"Eerste kus"	Wiels; Gillis; Vande Putte	3:28
8.	"Lawine"	Wiels; Gillis; Vande Putte	3:02
9.	"Duizend deuren"	Wiels; Gillis; Vande Putte	3:38
10.	"Superformidastisch"	Wiels; Gillis; Vande Putte	3:19
11.	"Puppy love"	Wiels; Gillis; Vande Putte	3:55
12.	"Vrij"	Wiels; Gillis; Vande Putte	3:47
Total length:			42:10

Kuma hé – 2009 reissue bonus disc
No.	Title	Writer(s)	Length
1.	"Kuma hé" (karaoke version)	Wiels; Gillis; Vande Putte	3:30
2.	"Borst vooruit" (karaoke version)	Wiels; Gillis; Vande Putte	3:21
3.	"Shakalaka" (karaoke version)	Wiels; Gillis; Vande Putte	3:39
4.	"Antwoordapparaat" (karaoke version)	Wiels; Gillis; Vande Putte	3:38
5.	"Alle baby's" (karaoke version)	Wiels; Gillis; Vande Putte	3:36
6.	"Zonnestraaltje" (karaoke version)	Wiels; Gillis; Vande Putte	3:17
7.	"Eerste kus" (karaoke version)	Wiels; Gillis; Vande Putte	3:28
8.	"Lawine" (karaoke version)	Wiels; Gillis; Vande Putte	3:02
9.	"Duizend deuren" (karaoke version)	Wiels; Gillis; Vande Putte	3:38
10.	"Superformidastisch" (karaoke version)	Wiels; Gillis; Vande Putte	3:19
11.	"Puppy love" (karaoke version)	Wiels; Gillis; Vande Putte	3:55
12.	"Vrij" (karaoke version)	Wiels; Gillis; Vande Putte	3:47
Total length:			42:10

== Chart performance ==
=== Weekly charts ===
Chart (2005)	Peak position
Belgian Albums (Ultratop Flanders)	1
Dutch Albums (Album Top 100)	1

=== Year-end charts ===
Chart (2005)	Position
Belgian Albums Chart (Flanders)	18
Dutch Albums Chart	26

== Certifications ==
Region	Certification	Certified units/sales
Belgium (BRMA)	Gold	15,000^{*}
Netherlands (NVPI)	Gold	40,000^{^}
^{*} Sales figures based on certification alone.^{^} Shipments figures based on certification alone.
