= Kusjes =

Studio album by K3
- Released: 19 October 2007
- Recorded: 2007
- Genre: Pop
- Length: 41:26
- Label: Studio 100
- Producer: Miguel Wiels; Peter Gillis

K3 chronology
| Ya ya yippee (2006) | Kusjes (2007) | MaMaSé! (2009) |

Singles from Kusjes
- 1. "Kusjesdag" Released: 25 June 2007; 2. "Je mama ziet je graag" Released: 25 February 2008

Kusjes (English: Kisses) is the ninth studio album by the Belgian music trio K3. The album was released on 19 October 2007 through label Studio 100. It reached the top five in both the Flemish and Dutch album charts. Two singles were released to promote the album: "Kusjesdag" and "Je mama ziet je graag". This was the last album to feature Kathleen Aerts.

== Track listing ==
Kusjes – Standard edition
| No. | Title | Writer(s) | Length |
|---|---|---|---|
| 1. | "Kusjesdag" | Miguel Wiels; Peter Gillis; Alain Vande Putte | 3:46 |
| 2. | "Je mama ziet je graag" | Wiels; Gillis; Vande Putte | 3:11 |
| 3. | "Billy, Billy" | Wiels; Gillis; Vande Putte | 3:08 |
| 4. | "Sterren" | Wiels; Gillis; Vande Putte | 2:53 |
| 5. | "Jongen van mijn dromen" | Wiels; Gillis; Vande Putte | 3:25 |
| 6. | "Ons huis" | Wiels; Gillis; Vande Putte | 3:29 |
| 7. | "Iedereen op de dansvloer" | Wiels; Gillis; Vande Putte | 3:52 |
| 8. | "De wereld veranderen" | Wiels; Gillis; Vande Putte | 3:29 |
| 9. | "Sproetje" | Wiels; Gillis; Vande Putte | 3:37 |
| 10. | "Prinses" | Wiels; Gillis; Vande Putte | 3:01 |
| 11. | "Vliegen als een vogel" | Wiels; Gillis; Vande Putte | 3:35 |
| 12. | "Ware liefde" | Wiels; Gillis; Vande Putte | 4:00 |
| Total length: | | | 41:26 |

== Personnel ==
Credits for Kusjes adapted from fan site.

- Kathleen Aerts – vocals
- Children's choir (Charlotte, Laure, Dorien, Charlotte, Lisa, Kiara, Marie-Hélène and Charlotte) – vocals (background)
- Karen Damen – vocals
- Peter Gillis – text, music, production, drums, programming
- Dieter Limbourg – saxophone
- Carlo Mertens – trombone
- Vincent Pierins – bass
- Serge Plume – trumpet
- Uwe Teichtert – mastering
- Pallieter Van Buggenhout – guitars
- Alain Vande Putte – text, music
- Kristel Verbeke – vocals
- Miguel Wiels – text, music, production, keyboards

== Chart performance ==
=== Weekly charts ===
| Chart (2007) | Peak position |
|---|---|
| Belgian Albums (Ultratop Flanders) | 4 |
| Dutch Albums (Album Top 100) | 2 |

=== Year-end charts ===
| Chart (2007) | Position |
|---|---|
| Belgian Albums Chart (Flanders) | 39 |
| Dutch Albums Chart | 44 |
| Chart (2008) | Position |
| Belgian Albums Chart (Flanders) | 64 |

== Certifications ==
| Region | Certification | Certified units/sales |
|---|---|---|
| Belgium (BRMA) | Platinum | 20,000^{*} |
^{*} Sales figures based on certification alone.
