= Oya lélé =

Studio album by K3
- Released: 5 September 2003
- Recorded: 2003
- Genre: Pop
- Length: 43:09
- Label: Studio 100
- Producer: Miguel Wiels; Peter Gillis

K3 chronology
Verliefd (2002)	Oya lélé (2003)	De wereld rond (2004)

2009 reissue album cover

Singles from Oya lélé
- 1. "De 3 biggetjes" Released: March 2003; 2. "Oya lélé" Released: June 2003; 3. "Frans liedje" Released: 6 October 2003; 4. "Hart verloren" Released: 9 February 2004

Oya lélé is the fifth studio album by the Belgian music trio K3. The album was released on 5 September 2003 through label Studio 100. The album is a typical kids-pop album with summer-vibes. Four singles were released to promote the album: "De 3 biggetjes", "Oya lélé", "Frans liedje" and "Hart verloren". The album reached the peak position in both the Dutch and Flemish album charts.

Oya lélé also contains the intro tune of the K3 talkshow De Wereld van K3. The song "Dat ding dat je doet" features vocals from Belgian singer Marcel Vanthilt. In 2009 a reissue of the album was released, which contains the original songs as well as karaoke versions of all the songs.

== Track listing ==
Oya lélé – Standard edition
No.	Title	Writer(s)	Length
1.	"De Wereld van K3"	Miguel Wiels; Peter Gillis; Alain Vande Putte	2:49
2.	"Oya lélé"	Wiels; Gillis; Vande Putte	3:43
3.	"Frans liedje"	Wiels; Gillis; Vande Putte	3:21
4.	"Bij ons thuis"	Wiels; Gillis; Vande Putte	3:07
5.	"Opa"	Wiels; Gillis; Vande Putte	3:33
6.	"Hart verloren"	Wiels; Gillis; Vande Putte	3:16
7.	"Hey hallo"	Wiels; Gillis; Vande Putte	3:20
8.	"Torenhoog"	Wiels; Gillis; Vande Putte	2:53
9.	"Mr. de President"	Wiels; Gillis; Vande Putte	3:23
10.	"Dat ding dat je doet" (featuring Marcel Vanthilt)	Wiels; Gillis; Vande Putte	3:14
11.	"Ik kan niet meer verder zonder jou"	Wiels; Gillis; Vande Putte	3:36
12.	"Hou me in je armen"	Wiels; Gillis; Vande Putte	3:32
13.	"De 3 biggetjes"	Danny Verbiest; Gert Verhulst; Hans Bourlon; Johan Vanden Eede; Wiels; Gillis; Vande Putte	3:22
Total length:			43:09

Oya lélé – 2009 reissue bonus disc
No.	Title	Writer(s)	Length
1.	"De Wereld van K3" (karaoke version)	Wiels; Gillis; Vande Putte	2:49
2.	"Oya lélé" (karaoke version)	Wiels; Gillis; Vande Putte	3:43
3.	"Frans liedje" (karaoke version)	Wiels; Gillis; Vande Putte	3:21
4.	"Bij ons thuis" (karaoke version)	Wiels; Gillis; Vande Putte	3:07
5.	"Opa" (karaoke version)	Wiels; Gillis; Vande Putte	3:33
6.	"Hart verloren" (karaoke version)	Wiels; Gillis; Vande Putte	3:16
7.	"Hey hallo" (karaoke version)	Wiels; Gillis; Vande Putte	3:20
8.	"Torenhoog" (karaoke version)	Wiels; Gillis; Vande Putte	2:53
9.	"Mr. de President" (karaoke version)	Wiels; Gillis; Vande Putte	3:23
10.	"Dat ding dat je doet" (karaoke version)	Wiels; Gillis; Vande Putte	3:14
11.	"Ik kan niet meer verder zonder jou" (karaoke version)	Wiels; Gillis; Vande Putte	3:36
12.	"Hou me in je armen" (karaoke version)	Wiels; Gillis; Vande Putte	3:32
13.	"De 3 biggetjes" (karaoke version)	Verbiest; Verhulst; Bourlon; Vanden Eede; Wiels; Gillis; Vande Putte	3:22
Total length:			43:09

== Chart performance ==
=== Weekly charts ===
Chart (2003)	Peak position
Belgian Albums (Ultratop Flanders)	1
Dutch Albums (Album Top 100)	1

=== Year-end charts ===
Chart (2003)	Position
Belgian Albums Chart (Flanders)	9
Dutch Albums Chart	5
Chart (2004)	Position
Dutch Albums Chart	96

== Certifications ==
Region	Certification	Certified units/sales
Belgium (BRMA)	Platinum	30,000^{*}
Netherlands (NVPI)	Platinum	80,000^{^}
^{*} Sales figures based on certification alone.^{^} Shipments figures based on certification alone.
