= De wereld rond =

Studio album by K3
- Released: 6 September 2004
- Recorded: 2004
- Genre: Pop; world
- Length: 41:33
- Label: Studio 100
- Producer: Miguel Wiels; Peter Gillis

K3 chronology
Oya lélé (2003)	De wereld rond (2004)	Kuma hé (2005)

2009 reissue album cover

Singles from De wereld rond
- 1. "Liefdeskapitein" Released: 21 June 2004; 2. "Superhero" Released: 29 September 2004; 3. "Zou er iemand zijn op Mars?" Released: 29 November 2004

De wereld rond (English: Around the World) is the sixth studio album by the Belgian girlgroup K3. The album was released on 6 September 2004 through label Studio 100. Three singles were released to promote the album: "Liefdeskapitein", "Superhero" and "Zou er iemand zijn op Mars?". The album reached the peak position in the Dutch album chart. In 2009, a reissue of the album was released, which contains the original songs as well as karaoke versions of the songs.

== Track listing ==
De wereld rond – Standard edition
No.	Title	Writer(s)	Length
1.	"Liefdeskapitein"	Miguel Wiels; Peter Gillis; Alain Vande Putte	3:34
2.	"Ongelooflijk idee"	Wiels; Gillis; Vande Putte	3:35
3.	"Dat ik van je hou"	Wiels; Gillis; Vande Putte	3:33
4.	"Wij blijven vrienden"	Wiels; Gillis; Vande Putte	3:12
5.	"Zou er iemand zijn op Mars?"	Wiels; Gillis; Vande Putte	3:45
6.	"Fiesta de amor"	Wiels; Gillis; Vande Putte	3:09
7.	"Hakuna matata"	Wiels; Gillis; Vande Putte	3:26
8.	"Rokjes"	Wiels; Gillis; Vande Putte	3:49
9.	"(Ik wil) Bamba"	Wiels; Gillis; Vande Putte	3:19
10.	"Alle Chinezen"	Wiels; Gillis; Vande Putte	3:05
11.	"Fiets"	Wiels; Gillis; Vande Putte	3:34
12.	"Babouchka"	Wiels; Gillis; Vande Putte	3:32
Total length:			41:33

De wereld rond – Standard edition bonus track
No.	Title	Writer(s)	Length
13.	"Superhero"	Wiels; Gillis; Vande Putte	3:31
Total length:			45:04

De wereld rond – 2009 reissue disc 1
No.	Title	Writer(s)	Length
13.	"Superhero"	Wiels; Gillis; Vande Putte	3:31
Total length:			45:04

De wereld rond – 2009 reissue disc 2
No.	Title	Writer(s)	Length
1.	"Liefdeskapitein" (karaoke version)	Wiels; Gillis; Vande Putte	3:34
2.	"Ongelooflijk idee" (karaoke version)	Wiels; Gillis; Vande Putte	3:35
3.	"Dat ik van je hou" (karaoke version)	Wiels; Gillis; Vande Putte	3:33
4.	"Wij blijven vrienden" (karaoke version)	Wiels; Gillis; Vande Putte	3:12
5.	"Zou er iemand zijn op Mars?" (karaoke version)	Wiels; Gillis; Vande Putte	3:45
6.	"Fiesta de amor" (karaoke version)	Wiels; Gillis; Vande Putte	3:09
7.	"Hakuna matata" (karaoke version)	Wiels; Gillis; Vande Putte	3:26
8.	"Rokjes" (karaoke version)	Wiels; Gillis; Vande Putte	3:49
9.	"(Ik wil) Bamba" (karaoke version)	Wiels; Gillis; Vande Putte	3:19
10.	"Alle Chinezen" (karaoke version)	Wiels; Gillis; Vande Putte	3:05
11.	"Fiets" (karaoke version)	Wiels; Gillis; Vande Putte	3:34
12.	"Babouchka" (karaoke version)	Wiels; Gillis; Vande Putte	3:32
13.	"Superhero" (karaoke version)	Wiels; Gillis; Vande Putte	3:31
Total length:			45:04

== Chart performance ==
=== Weekly charts ===
Chart (2004)	Peak position
Belgian Albums (Ultratop Flanders)	1
Dutch Albums (Album Top 100)	1

=== Year-end charts ===
Chart (2004)	Position
Belgian Albums Chart (Flanders)	26
Dutch Albums Chart	19

== Certifications ==
Region	Certification	Certified units/sales
Belgium (BEA)	Gold	15,000^{*}
^{*} Sales figures based on certification alone.
