= Ya Ya Yippee =

Studio album by K3
- Released: 4 September 2006
- Recorded: 2006
- Genre: Pop
- Length: 39:20
- Label: Studio 100
- Producer: Miguel Wiels

K3 chronology
Kuma hé (2005)	Ya Ya Yippee (2006)	Kusjes (2007)

Singles from Ya Ya Yippee
- 1. "Ya Ya Yippee" Released: 6 June 2006; 2. "Dokter dokter" Released: 2 October 2006

Ya Ya Yippee is the eighth studio album by the Belgian girlgroup K3. The album was released on 4 September 2006 through label Studio 100, and is a mix of pop and country music. Two singles were released from the album: "Ya Ya Yippee" and "Dokter Dokter". The album reached the peak position in both the Dutch and Flemish album charts.

== Track listing ==
Ya Ya Yippee – Standard edition
No.	Title	Writer(s)	Length
1.	"Ya Ya Yippee"	Miguel Wiels; Peter Gillis; Alain Vande Putte	3:36
2.	"Dokter dokter"	Wiels; Gillis; Vande Putte	3:26
3.	"Trouwen"	Wiels; Gillis; Vande Putte	3:03
4.	"Zoo"	Wiels; Gillis; Vande Putte	3:17
5.	"Eskimo"	Wiels; Gillis; Vande Putte	3:19
6.	"Sprookjesbos"	Wiels; Gillis; Vande Putte	3:39
7.	"Bibliotheek"	Wiels; Gillis; Vande Putte	3:05
8.	"Feestje"	Wiels; Gillis; Vande Putte	3:15
9.	"Op televisie"	Wiels; Gillis; Vande Putte	3:00
10.	"Excuseer me"	Wiels; Gillis; Vande Putte	2:55
11.	"Vriendschap"	Wiels; Gillis; Vande Putte	3:40
12.	"Eeny meeny"	Wiels; Gillis; Vande Putte	3:05
Total length:			39:20

== Chart performance ==
=== Weekly charts ===
Chart (2006)	Peak position
Belgian Albums (Ultratop Flanders)	1
Dutch Albums (Album Top 100)	1

=== Year-end charts ===
Chart (2006)	Position
Belgian Albums Chart (Flanders)	8
Dutch Albums Chart	30

== Certifications ==
Region	Certification
Belgium (BEA)	Platinum
