= Verliefd =

Studio album by K3
- Released: 9 September 2002
- Recorded: 2002
- Genre: Pop
- Length: 46:28
- Label: Studio 100
- Producer: Miguel Wiels; Peter Gillis

K3 chronology
Tele-Romeo (2001)	Verliefd (2002)	Oya lélé (2003)

2009 reissue album cover

Singles from Verliefd
- 1. "Feest" Released: 12 June 2002; 2. "Papapa" Released: 8 September 2002; 3. "Verliefd" Released: 30 November 2002

Verliefd (English: In Love) is the fourth studio album by the Belgian girlgroup K3. The album was released on 9 September 2002 through label Niels William. The album is a typical kids-pop album with songs about love. It reached the peak position in both the Flemish and Dutch album charts.

Three singles were released to promote the album: "Feest", a song about partying in the whole world, "Papapa", a song about loving your father, and "Verliefd", a sweet song about being in love. In 2009 a reissue was released which contains the original songs and karaoke versions of all the songs.

== Track listing ==
Verliefd – Standard edition
No.	Title	Writer(s)	Length
1.	"Feest"	Miguel Wiels; Peter Gillis; Alain Vande Putte	3:20
2.	"Papapa"	Wiels; Gillis; Vande Putte	3:08
3.	"SMS"	Wiels; Gillis; Vande Putte	3:29
4.	"Verliefd"	Wiels; Gillis; Vande Putte	3:35
5.	"Hollywood"	Wiels; Gillis; Vande Putte	3:30
6.	"Samen feesten"	Wiels; Gillis; Vande Putte	3:25
7.	"Als het regent"	Wiels; Gillis; Vande Putte	3:48
8.	"Noodkreet"	Wiels; Gillis; Vande Putte	3:11
9.	"Beautiful Boy"	Wiels; Gillis; Vande Putte	3:51
10.	"Je doet maar wat"	Wiels; Gillis; Vande Putte	3:50
11.	"Letter V"	Wiels; Gillis; Vande Putte	3:35
12.	"Happy Birthday"	Wiels; Gillis; Vande Putte	3:21
13.	"Eeuwig en altijd"	Wiels; Gillis; Vande Putte	4:25
Total length:			46:28

Verliefd – 2009 reissue bonus disc
No.	Title	Writer(s)	Length
1.	"Feest" (karaoke version)	Wiels; Gillis; Vande Putte	3:20
2.	"Papapa" (karaoke version)	Wiels; Gillis; Vande Putte	3:08
3.	"SMS" (karaoke version)	Wiels; Gillis; Vande Putte	3:29
4.	"Verliefd" (karaoke version)	Wiels; Gillis; Vande Putte	3:35
5.	"Hollywood" (karaoke version)	Wiels; Gillis; Vande Putte	3:30
6.	"Samen feesten" (karaoke version)	Wiels; Gillis; Vande Putte	3:25
7.	"Als het regent" (karaoke version)	Wiels; Gillis; Vande Putte	3:48
8.	"Noodkreet" (karaoke version)	Wiels; Gillis; Vande Putte	3:11
9.	"Beautiful Boy" (karaoke version)	Wiels; Gillis; Vande Putte	3:51
10.	"Je doet maar wat" (karaoke version)	Wiels; Gillis; Vande Putte	3:50
11.	"Letter V" (karaoke version)	Wiels; Gillis; Vande Putte	3:35
12.	"Happy Birthday" (karaoke version)	Wiels; Gillis; Vande Putte	3:21
13.	"Eeuwig en altijd" (karaoke version)	Wiels; Gillis; Vande Putte	4:25
Total length:			46:28

== Chart performance ==
=== Weekly charts ===
Chart (2002)	Peak position
Belgian Albums (Ultratop Flanders)	1
Dutch Albums (Album Top 100)	1

=== Year-end charts ===
Chart (2002)	Position
Belgian Albums Chart (Flanders)	6
Dutch Albums Chart	10

== Certifications ==
Region	Certification	Certified units/sales
Belgium (BRMA)	2× Platinum	60,000^{*}
Netherlands (NVPI)	2× Platinum	160,000^{^}
^{*} Sales figures based on certification alone.^{^} Shipments figures based on certification alone.
