= Parels =

Studio album by K3
- Released: 4 October 1999
- Recorded: 1999
- Genre: Pop
- Length: 40:52
- Label: Capetown / Wivani
- Producer: Miguel Wiels

K3 chronology
Parels (1999)	Alle kleuren (2000)

Singles from Parels
- 1. "Wat ik wil" Released: 1998; 2. "Heyah mama" Released: April 1999; 3. "Yeke yeke" Released: August 1999; 4. "I Love You Baby" Released: November 1999; 5. "Op elkaar (remix 2000)" Released: March 2000

Parels (English: Pearls) is the debut album of Belgian girl group K3. It was released on 4 October 1999 through the Capetown/Wivani label. The album reached the 2nd position in the Flemish albums chart.

== Track listing ==
Parels – Standard edition
No.	Title	Writer(s)	Length
1.	"Yeke yeke"	Miguel Wiels; Peter Gillis; Alain Vande Putte	3:26
2.	"Wat ik wil"	Marc Paelinck; Ronald Buersens; Dennis Peirs	3:38
3.	"Heyah mama"	Wiels; Gillis; Vande Putte	3:21
4.	"Op elkaar"	Wiels; Gillis; Vande Putte	3:56
5.	"Parels"	Wiels; Gillis; Vande Putte	4:10
6.	"I Love You Baby"	Wiels; Gillis; Vande Putte	3:41
7.	"Ik kom tot leven"	Wiels; Gillis; Vande Putte	3:50
8.	"Altijd van je dromen"	Wiels; Gillis; Vande Putte	3:44
9.	"Geen tweede keer"	Paelinck; Buersens; Peirs	4:13
10.	"Zonder jou"	Paelinck; Buersens; Peirs	3:46
11.	"Oh ja"	Wiels; Gillis; Vande Putte	3:07
Total length:			40:52

== Chart performance ==
=== Weekly charts ===
Chart (1999)	Peak position
Belgian Albums (Ultratop Flanders)	2

=== Year-end charts ===
Chart (1999)	Position
Belgian Albums Chart (Flanders)	8
Chart (2000)	Position
Belgian Albums Chart (Flanders)	4

== Certifications ==
Region	Certification	Certified units/sales
Belgium (BRMA)	2× Platinum	60,000^{*}
Netherlands (NVPI)	Platinum	100,000^{^}
^{*} Sales figures based on certification alone.^{^} Shipments figures based on certification alone.

== Parels 2000 ==
On 28 September 2000 a reissue of the album was released through label Niels William, called Parels 2000. This album also charted in The Netherlands. Parels 2000 contains all the original songs as listed above, with an extra CD containing remixes and karaoke versions of the original songs. The remix of "Op elkaar", called "Op elkaar (remix 2000)" was released as fifth single from the album.

=== Track listing ===
Parels 2000 – bonus disc
No.	Title	Writer(s)	Length
1.	"Op elkaar" (Top remix)	Wiels; Gillis; Vande Putte	3:45
2.	"Heyah mama" (ID remix)	Wiels; Gillis; Vande Putte	2:57
3.	"Yeke yeke" (ID remix)	Wiels; Gillis; Vande Putte	2:46
4.	"Wat ik wil" (Milk Inc. remix)	Paelinck; Buersens; Peirs	3:22
5.	"Altijd van je dromen" (Top remix)	Wiels; Gillis; Vande Putte	3:35
6.	"Wat ik wil" (karaoke version)	Paelinck; Buersens; Peirs	3:38
7.	"Heyah mama" (karaoke version)	Wiels; Gillis; Vande Putte	3:21
8.	"Yeke yeke" (karaoke version)	Wiels; Gillis; Vande Putte	3:26
9.	"I Love You Baby" (karaoke version)	Wiels; Gillis; Vande Putte	3:41
10.	"Op elkaar" (karaoke version)	Wiels; Gillis; Vande Putte	3:45
Total length:			40:06

=== Chart performance ===
==== Weekly charts ====
Chart (2000)	Peak position
Belgian Albums (Ultratop Flanders)	2
Dutch Albums (Album Top 100)	15

==== Year-end charts ====
Chart (2001)	Position
Belgian Albums Chart (Flanders)	81
Dutch Albums Chart	48
Chart (2002)	Position
Dutch Albums Chart	54

== 2008 reissue ==
On August 11, 2008, another reissue of the album was released. This version of Parels contains two CDs, with on the first one the original songs as listed above, and on the second one karaoke versions of all the songs.

=== Track listing ===
Parels – 2008 reissue bonus disc
No.	Title	Writer(s)	Length
1.	"Yeke yeke" (karaoke version)	Wiels; Gillis; Vande Putte	3:26
2.	"Wat ik wil" (karaoke version)	Paelinck; Buersens; Peirs	3:38
3.	"Heyah mama" (karaoke version)	Wiels; Gillis; Vande Putte	3:21
4.	"Op elkaar" (karaoke version)	Wiels; Gillis; Vande Putte	3:56
5.	"Parels" (karaoke version)	Wiels; Gillis; Vande Putte	4:10
6.	"I Love You Baby" (karaoke version)	Wiels; Gillis; Vande Putte	3:41
7.	"Ik kom tot leven" (karaoke version)	Wiels; Gillis; Vande Putte	3:50
8.	"Altijd van je dromen" (karaoke version)	Wiels; Gillis; Vande Putte	3:44
9.	"Geen tweede keer" (karaoke version)	Paelinck; Buersens; Peirs
10.	"Oh ja" (karaoke version)		3:07
Total length:			40:52
