= Alle kleuren =

Studio album by K3
- Released: 15 September 2000
- Recorded: 2000
- Genre: Pop; dance
- Length: 37:56
- Label: Niels William
- Producer: Miguel Wiels; Peter Gillis

K3 chronology
Parels (1999)	Alle kleuren (2000)	Tele-Romeo (2001)

Singles from Alle kleuren
- 1. "Alle kleuren" Released: June 2000; 2. "Yipee yipee" Released: 25 September 2000; 3. "Oma's aan de top" Released: December 2000; 4. "Hippie shake" Released: 26 February 2001

Alle kleuren (English: All Colours) is the second studio album by the Belgian music trio K3. The album was released on 15 September 2000 through label Niels William. The album became a massive hit in Flanders and the Netherlands: it reached the peak position in both the Dutch and Flemish album charts. A few months after the original release, a limited edition, with two extra songs and some karaoke versions of original songs, was released. In 2008 a reissue was released with the original songs and an extra CD with karaoke versions of the songs.

The first single from the album is called "Alle kleuren" and reached number two in the Ultratop 50. "Yippee yippee" is the second single from the album, a happy pop song. The third and fourth singles are "Oma's aan de top" and "Hippie shake".

== Track listing ==
Alle kleuren – Standard edition
No.	Title	Writer(s)	Length
1.	"Alle kleuren"	Miguel Wiels; Peter Gillis; Alain Vande Putte	3:38
2.	"Hippie shake"	Wiels; Gillis; Vande Putte	2:32
3.	"Yippee yippee"	Wiels; Gillis; Vande Putte	3:20
4.	"Leonardo"	Wiels; Gillis; Vande Putte	3:13
5.	"Oma's aan de top"	Wiels; Gillis; Vande Putte	3:23
6.	"1, 2, Doe met me mee"	Wiels; Gillis; Vande Putte	3:52
7.	"Miljoen"	Wiels; Gillis; Vande Putte	3:29
8.	"Laat de wind maar waaien"	Wiels; Gillis; Vande Putte	3:29
9.	"Om te dromen"	Wiels; Gillis; Vande Putte	3:52
10.	"Ik schreeuw het van de daken"	Wiels; Gillis; Vande Putte	3:26
11.	"Jongens zijn gek!"	Wiels; Gillis; Vande Putte	3:14
12.	"Doe maar"	Wiels; Gillis; Vande Putte	3:28
Total length:			37:56

Alle kleuren – Standard edition bonus track
No.	Title	Writer(s)	Length
13.	"De Gordel is er weer"	Wiels; Gillis; Vande Putte	3:28
Total length:			41:24

Alle kleuren – Limited edition bonus disc
No.	Title	Writer(s)	Length
1.	"Ster aan de hemel"	Wiels; Gillis; Vande Putte	3:46
2.	"Stapelgek"	Wiels; Gillis; Vande Putte	3:00
3.	"Alle kleuren" (karaoke version)	Wiels; Gillis; Vande Putte	3:38
4.	"Yippee yippee" (karaoke version)	Wiels; Gillis; Vande Putte	3:20
5.	"Oma's aan de top" (karaoke version)	Wiels; Gillis; Vande Putte	3:23
6.	"Hippie shake" (karaoke version)	Wiels; Gillis; Vande Putte	2:32
Total length:			19:39

Alle kleuren – 2008 reissue disc 1
No.	Title	Writer(s)	Length
13.	"Ster aan de hemel"	Wiels; Gillis; Vande Putte	3:46
14.	"Stapelgek"	Wiels; Gillis; Vande Putte	3:00
Total length:			44:42

Alle kleuren – 2008 reissue disc 2
No.	Title	Writer(s)	Length
1.	"Alle kleuren" (karaoke version)	Wiels; Gillis; Vande Putte	3:38
2.	"Hippie shake" (karaoke version)	Wiels; Gillis; Vande Putte	2:32
3.	"Yippee yippee" (karaoke version)	Wiels; Gillis; Vande Putte	3:20
4.	"Leonardo" (karaoke version)	Wiels; Gillis; Vande Putte	3:13
5.	"Oma's aan de top" (karaoke version)	Wiels; Gillis; Vande Putte	3:23
6.	"1, 2, Doe met me mee" (karaoke version)	Wiels; Gillis; Vande Putte	3:52
7.	"Miljoen" (karaoke version)	Wiels; Gillis; Vande Putte	3:29
8.	"Laat de wind maar waaien" (karaoke version)	Wiels; Gillis; Vande Putte	3:29
9.	"Om te dromen" (karaoke version)	Wiels; Gillis; Vande Putte	3:52
10.	"Ik schreeuw het van de daken" (karaoke version)	Wiels; Gillis; Vande Putte	3:26
11.	"Jongens zijn gek!" (karaoke version)	Wiels; Gillis; Vande Putte	3:14
12.	"Doe maar" (karaoke version)	Wiels; Gillis; Vande Putte	3:28
13.	"Ster aan de hemel" (karaoke version)	Wiels; Gillis; Vande Putte	3:46
14.	"Stapelgek" (karaoke version)	Wiels; Gillis; Vande Putte	3:00
Total length:			44:42

== Personnel ==
Credits for Alle kleuren adapted from fan site.

- Kathleen Aerts – vocals
- Karen Damen – vocals
- Peter Gillis – text, music, production, drums
- Pietro Lacirignola – saxophone
- Patrick Mortier – trumpet
- Vincent Pierins – bass
- Patrick Steenaerts – guitar
- Alain Vande Putte – text, music
- Kristel Verbeke – vocals
- Rino Ver Eecke – vocals (radio voice-over)
- Alexia Waku – vocals (background)
- Miguel Wiels – text, music, production, keyboards

== Chart performance ==
=== Weekly charts ===
Chart (2000)	Peak position
Belgian Albums (Ultratop Flanders)	1
Dutch Albums (Album Top 100)	1

=== Year-end charts ===
Chart (2000)	Position
Belgian Albums Chart (Flanders)	2
Chart (2001)	Position
Belgian Albums Chart (Flanders)	1
Dutch Albums Chart	5
Chart (2002)	Position
Dutch Albums Chart	46

== Certifications ==
Region	Certification	Certified units/sales
Belgium (BEA)	5× Platinum	150,000^{*}
Netherlands (NVPI)	2× Platinum	160,000^{^}
^{*} Sales figures based on certification alone.^{^} Shipments figures based on certification alone.
