= Tele-Romeo =

Studio album by K3
- Released: 3 September 2001
- Recorded: 2001
- Genre: Pop
- Length: 39:32
- Label: Niels William
- Producer: Miguel Wiels; Peter Gillis

K3 chronology
Alle kleuren (2000)	Tele-Romeo (2001)	Verliefd (2002)

Singles from Tele-Romeo
- 1. "Tele-Romeo" Released: 4 April 2001; 2. "Mama's en papa's" Released: 15 September 2001; 3. "Je hebt een vriend" Released: 1 December 2001; 4. "Toveren" Released: February 2002

Tele-Romeo is the third studio album by the Belgian girl group K3. The album was released on 3 September 2001 by label Niels William. The album is a pop album for kids. Tele-Romeo reached the peak position in both the Dutch and Flemish album charts. A limited edition of the album was released and contains an extra song ("Toveren", the fourth single from the album) and a few karaoke versions of the original songs. In 2008, a reissue was released with the original songs and an extra CD with karaoke versions of the songs.

== Track listing ==
Tele-Romeo – Standard edition
No.	Title	Writer(s)	Length
1.	"Tele-Romeo"	Miguel Wiels; Peter Gillis; Alain Vande Putte	3:19
2.	"Mama's en papa's"	Wiels; Gillis; Vande Putte	3:00
3.	"Keileuke zomer"	Wiels; Gillis; Vande Putte	3:26
4.	"Ali Baba"	Wiels; Gillis; Vande Putte	3:55
5.	"Blijven staan"	Wiels; Gillis; Vande Putte	3:56
6.	"Je hebt een vriend"	Wiels; Gillis; Vande Putte	3:25
7.	"Baby Come Back"	Wiels; Gillis; Vande Putte	3:35
8.	"Chacha loco"	Wiels; Gillis; Vande Putte	3:33
9.	"Hand in hand"	Wiels; Gillis; Vande Putte	4:04
10.	"Jupiter"	Wiels; Gillis; Vande Putte	3:46
11.	"Honingbeer"	Wiels; Gillis; Vande Putte	3:52
12.	"Iedereen is anders"	Wiels; Gillis; Vande Putte	3:41
Total length:			39:32

Tele-Romeo – Standard edition bonus track
No.	Title	Writer(s)	Length
13.	"Blub, ik ben een vis!"	Jesper Winge Leisner; Vande Putte	3:11
Total length:			42:43

Tele-Romeo – Limited edition disc 1
No.	Title	Writer(s)	Length
13.	"Blub, ik ben een vis!"	Winge Leisner; Vande Putte	3:11
Total length:			42:43

Tele-Romeo – Limited edition disc 2
No.	Title	Writer(s)	Length
1.	"Toveren"	Gert Verhulst; Hans Bourlon; Johan Vanden Eede; Gillis; Vande Putte	3:08
2.	"Tele-Romeo" (karaoke version)	Wiels; Gillis; Vande Putte	3:19
3.	"Blub, ik ben een vis!" (karaoke version)	Winge Leisner; Vande Putte	3:11
4.	"Mama's en papa's" (karaoke version)	Wiels; Gillis; Vande Putte	3:00
5.	"Je hebt een vriend" (karaoke version)	Wiels; Gillis; Vande Putte	3:25
6.	"Toveren" (karaoke version)	Verhulst; Bourlon; Vanden Eede; Gillis; Vande Putte	3:08
Total length:			19:11

Tele-Romeo – 2008 reissue disc 1
No.	Title	Writer(s)	Length
13.	"Blub, ik ben een vis!"	Winge Leisner; Vande Putte	3:11
14.	"Toveren"	Verhulst; Bourlon; Vanden Eede; Gillis; Vande Putte	3:08
Total length:			45:51

Tele-Romeo – 2008 reissue disc 2
No.	Title	Writer(s)	Length
1.	"Tele-Romeo" (karaoke version)	Wiels; Gillis; Vande Putte	3:19
2.	"Mama's en papa's" (karaoke version)	Wiels; Gillis; Vande Putte	3:00
3.	"Keileuke zomer" (karaoke version)	Wiels; Gillis; Vande Putte	3:26
4.	"Ali Baba" (karaoke version)	Wiels; Gillis; Vande Putte	3:55
5.	"Blijven staan" (karaoke version)	Wiels; Gillis; Vande Putte	3:56
6.	"Je hebt een vriend" (karaoke version)	Wiels; Gillis; Vande Putte	3:25
7.	"Baby Come Back" (karaoke version)	Wiels; Gillis; Vande Putte	3:35
8.	"Chacha loco" (karaoke version)	Wiels; Gillis; Vande Putte	3:33
9.	"Jupiter" (karaoke version)	Wiels; Gillis; Vande Putte	3:46
10.	"Honingbeer" (karaoke version)	Wiels; Gillis; Vande Putte	3:52
11.	"Iedereen is anders" (karaoke version)	Wiels; Gillis; Vande Putte	3:41
12.	"Blub, ik ben een vis!" (karaoke version)	Winge Leisner; Vande Putte	3:11
13.	"Toveren" (karaoke version)	Verhulst; Bourlon; Vanden Eede; Gillis; Vande Putte	3:08
Total length:			41:47

== Personnel ==
Credits for Tele-Romeo adapted from fan site.

- Kathleen Aerts – vocals
- Hans Bourlon – text (only for "Toveren")
- Karen Damen – vocals
- Peter Gillis – text, music, production, drums
- Pietro Lacirignola – saxophone
- Dieter Limbourg – saxophone
- Vincent Pierins – bass
- Serge Plume – trumpet
- Patrick Steenaerts – guitar
- Children's choir Studio 100 – vocals (background)
- Alain Vande Putte – text, music
- Johan Vanden Eede – music (only for "Toveren")
- Kristel Verbeke – vocals
- Gert Verhulst – text (only for "Toveren")
- Miguel Wiels – text, music, keyboards
- Jesper Winge Leisner – text, music (only for "Blub, ik ben een vis")

== Chart performance ==
=== Weekly charts ===
Chart (2000)	Peak position
Belgian Albums (Ultratop Flanders)	1
Dutch Albums (Album Top 100)	1

=== Year-end charts ===
Chart (2001)	Position
Belgian Albums Chart (Flanders)	2
Dutch Albums Chart	25
Chart (2002)	Position
Belgian Albums Chart (Flanders)	23
Dutch Albums Chart	8

== Certifications ==
Region	Certification	Certified units/sales
Belgium (BRMA)	4× Platinum	120,000^{*}
Netherlands (NVPI)	2× Platinum	160,000^{^}
^{*} Sales figures based on certification alone.^{^} Shipments figures based on certification alone.
