= The Voice Kids (Belgian TV series) season 8 =

Season of television series

The Voice Kids
- Season 8
- Hosted by: Nora Gharib; Aaron Blommaert
- Coaches: Metejoor; Maksim Stojanac; Camille Dhont; Thibault Christiaensen

Release
- Original network: VTM

The eighth season of the talent show The Voice Kids returns after two years and will premiere in 2026 on VTM. Metejoor returned for his third consecutive season. He was joined by Camille Dhont, Maksim Stojanac and Thibault Christiaensen. Nora Gharib and Aaron Blommaert returned to present the show, for their second seasons.

== Coaches and host ==
=== Coaches ===
The Voice Kids van Vlaanderen season 8 coaches

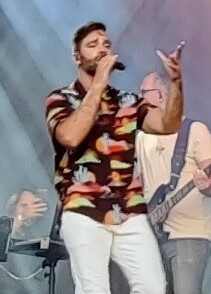
Metejoor

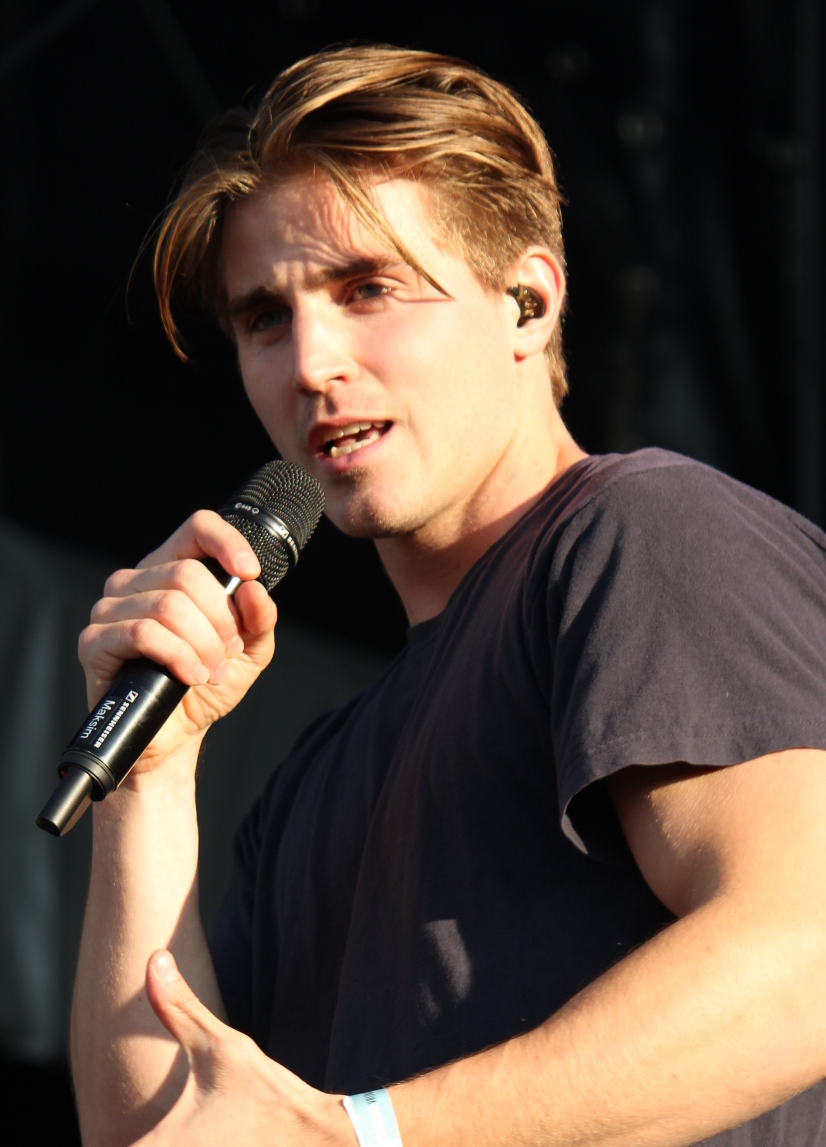
Maksim Stojanac

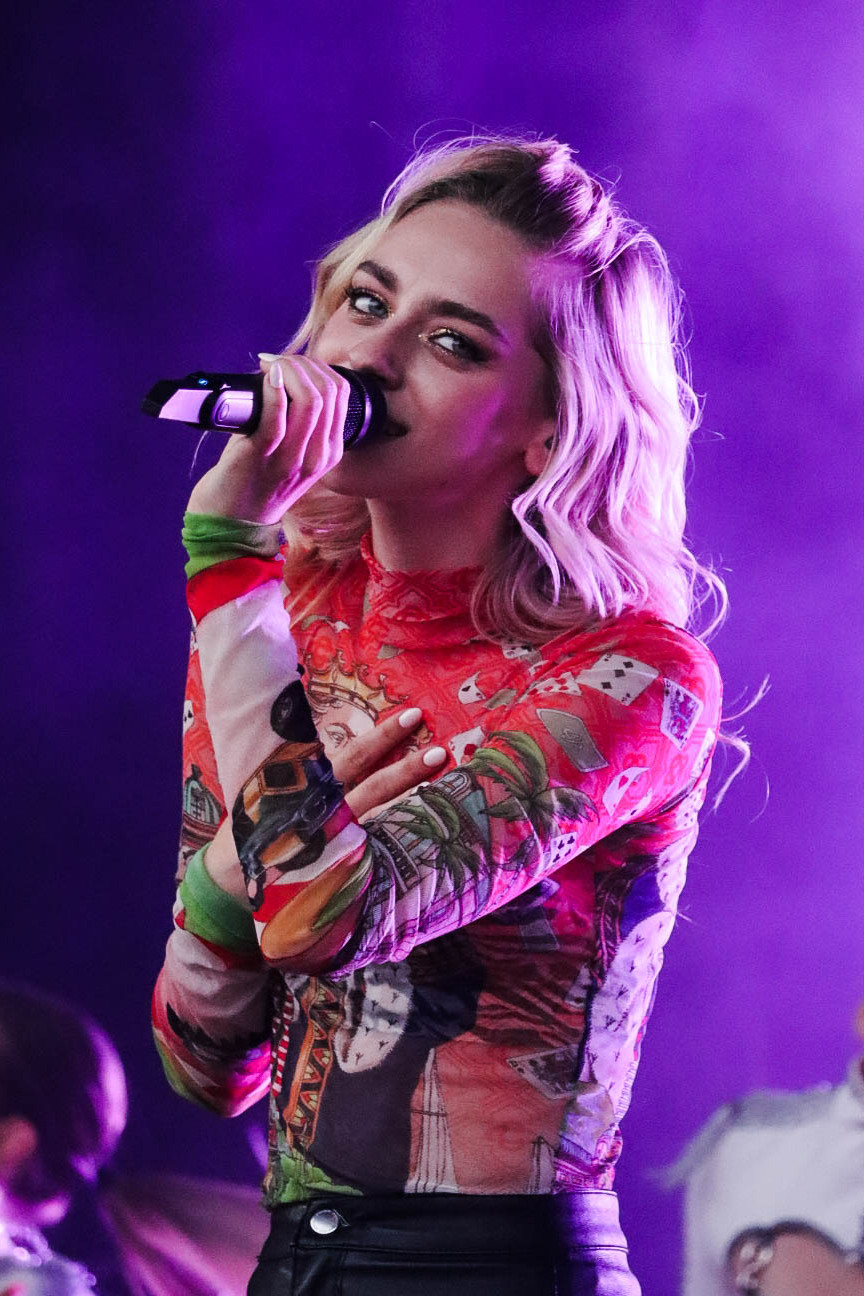
Camille Dhont

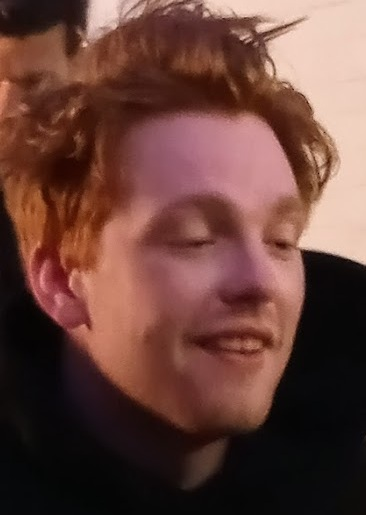
Thibault Christiaensen

On 22 December 2025, it was announced that Laura Tesoro, Coely, and Pommelien Thijs would be leaving the show, while Metejoor would return for his third season. He was joined by former backstage presenter Maksim Stojanac, Thibault Christiaensen, and Camille Dhont, the latter of whom had previously competed on the show but failed to receive a chair turn.

=== Hosts ===
On the same date, Nora Gharib, Aaron Blommaert were announced to remain as the main presenters.
