= Thibault Christiaensen =

- Christiaensen in 2026

Background information
- Born: 14 March 1995 (age 31); Antwerp, Belgium
- Genre: Garage rock
- Occupations: Singer, guitarist, radio personality
- Instruments: Vocals, guitar

Thibault Christiaensen (born 14 March 1995) is a Belgian singer and guitarist. Christiaensen is known primarily for his work as the frontman in the garage rock band Equal Idiots. He is also a radio personality for Studio Brussels and hosts the podcast Thank you, boomer.

== Early life ==
Christiaensen was born in Antwerp and grew up in Hoogstraten. He studied Language and Literature at the University of Antwerp and obtained a master's degree in multilingual professional communication.

== Career ==
=== Music ===
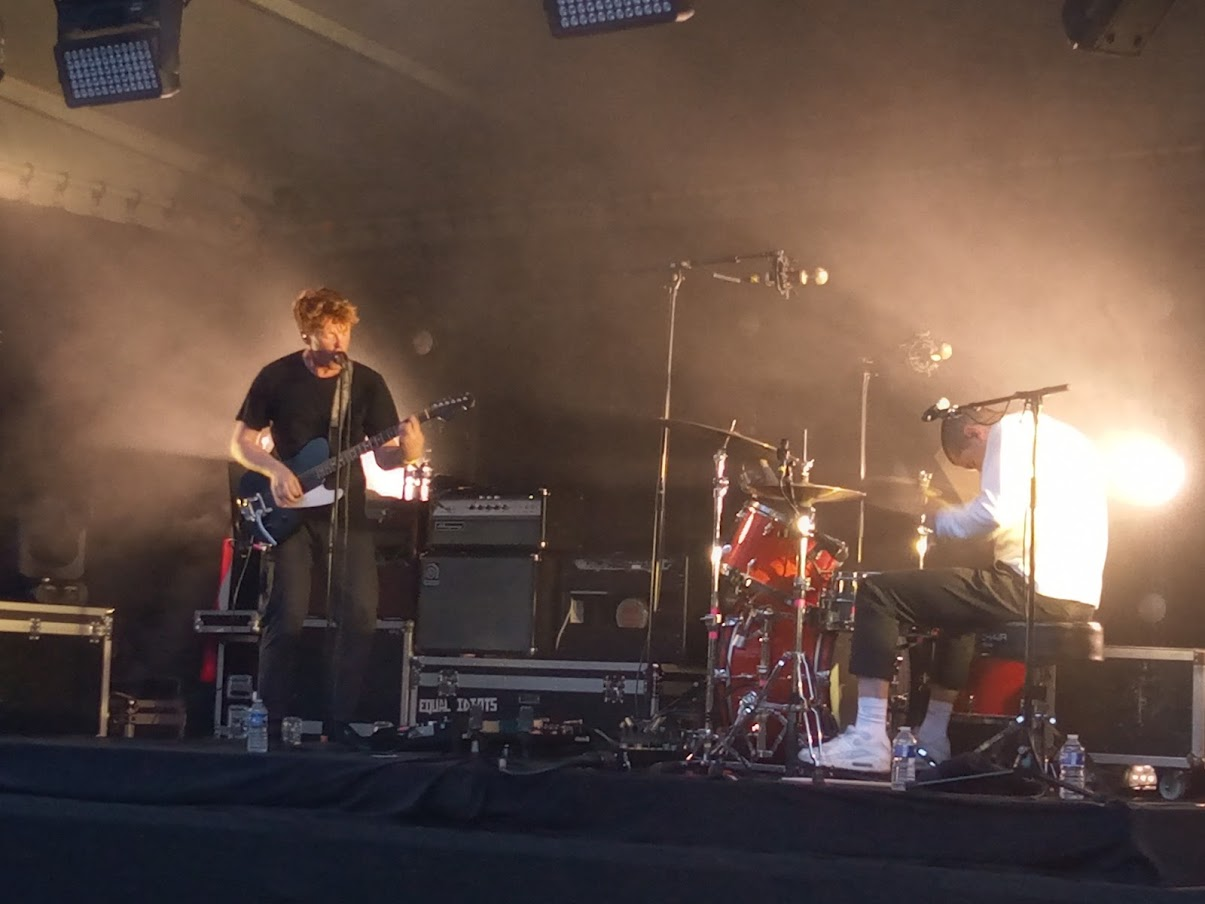
Christiaensen (left) performing with Pieter Bruurs in Equal Idiots

==== Equal Idiots ====
Christiaensen, alongside Pieter Bruurs, founded the garage rock band Equal Idiots. The band's breakthrough came in the fall of 2016 when they won the public prize of De Zes, won De Nieuwe Lichting and reached the final of Humo's Rock Rally. Their debut single, "Put My Head in the Ground" was the harbinger of their debut album, Eagle Castle BBQ, with release on June 23, 2017.

The band played at summer festivals such as Suikerrock in 2017, Dour and Rock Werchter in 2018, and Pukkelpop, Lokerse Feesten, Werchter Parklife] and Crammerock in 2019. The band also performed in the Netherlands, in 2018 they performed at Eurosonic Noorderslag in Groningen.

In 2020, Equal Idiots played for the first time in the Great Hall of the AB in Brussels, where they presented their new album Adolescence Blues Community. In 2022, the band performed as the opening act for Jack White in Vorst Nationaal.

In 2024, Equal Idiots together with The Priceduifkes gave eight concerts in different cities in Japan, VRT later published "De Kempen in Japan' on VRT MAX. That same year they played on the main stage on Rock Werchter and in the Marquee on Pukkelpop. Their single "I Am The Light" reached second place on the Studio Brussels hit list.

=== Radio ===
In early 2021, he became co-host of the morning program at Studio Brussel, initially with Michèle Cuvelier in De Ochtend and since September 2021 with Fien Germijns in Fien en Thibault Staan Op. In the week of 12 November 2024, he presented Fien en Thibault staan niet op at Studio Brussel, where both presenters were hiding and had to be searched by listeners. He and Germijns quit Fien en Thibault Staan Op at the end of June 2025.

=== Other work ===
In 2017, Christiaensen was one of the candidates in the show De Slimmeste Mens Ter Wereld. Since 2022, Christiaensen, together with Sander De Keere, has been providing the column "The Classics" in the program Iedereen Beroemd on VRT 1. In 2026, he will debut as a coach on the children's singing program The Voice Kids Vlaanderen alongside Metejoor, Camille Dhont, and Maksim Stojanac.

== Discography ==
=== Singles ===
(as part of Equal Idiots)

- from album Eagle Castle BBQ
  - 2014: Salmon Pink
  - 2017: Put My Head In The Ground
  - 2017: Hippie Man
  - 2017: Styx
  - 2017: The Seduction Of Judas
  - 2017: I Know
  - 2017: Money Man Midas
  - 2017: Butter (Up Down)
  - 2017: Eagle Castle BBQ
  - 2017: Toothpaste Jacky
  - 2017: What You Gonna Say
- from album Adolescence Blues Community
  - 2020: Run
  - 2020: Alphabet Aerobics
  - 2020: Comfortable Home
  - 2020: Dogs
  - 2020: Knife & Gun
  - 2020: Wrong
  - 2020: Time
  - 2020: 16
  - 2020: Adolescence Blues
  - 2020: Cowboy Mambo's Desert Dream

=== Albums ===
(as part of Equal Idiots)

- 2017: Eagle Castle BBQ
- 2020: Adolescence Blues Community
- 2024: Equal Idiots
