= Maksim Stojanac =

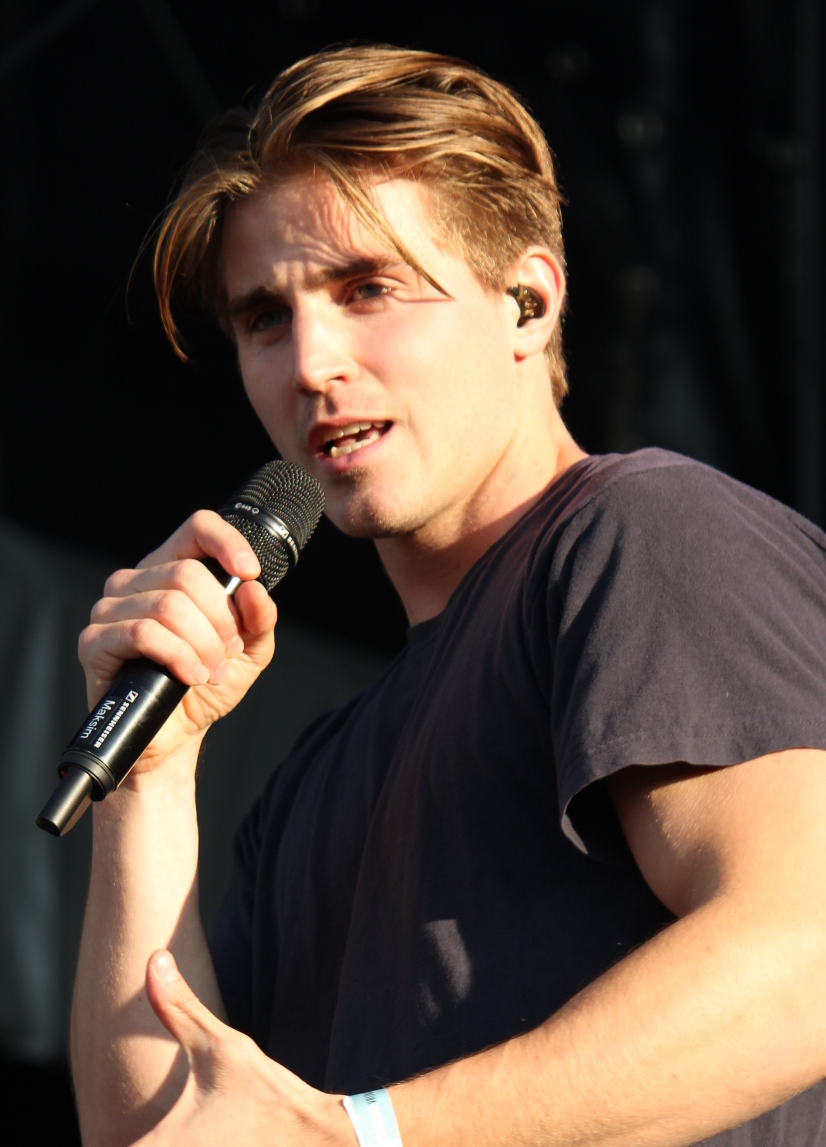
- Stojanac in 2023

Background information
- Born: 29 December 1997 (age 28); Antwerp, Belgium
- Occupations: Singer, actor
- Instruments: Vocals

Maksim Stojanac (born 29 December 1997) is a Belgian singer, presenter and actor. As a singer, Stojanac has achieved success in both Flanders and Netherlands. In addition to his musical career, he has acted in films and has appeared in various roles on several television shows.

== Early life ==
Stojanac was born in Antwerp on 29 December 1997. His father is Serbian and his mother is Russian and Ukrainian. Stojanac studied business management at Karel de Grote University of Applied Sciences and Arts. He also played football.

== Career ==
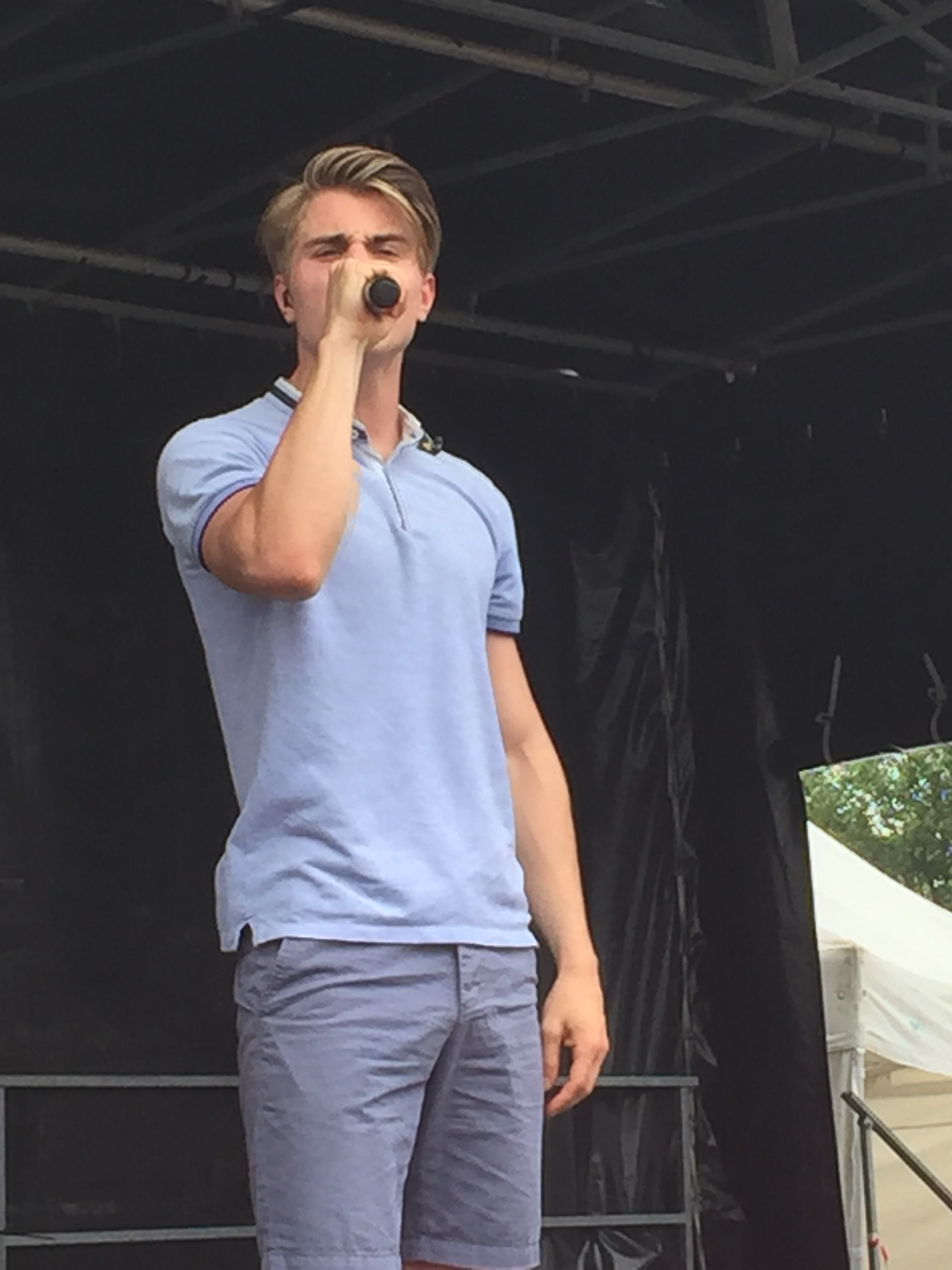
Stojanac performing at the start of his career

After turning down a possible professional contract as a footballer, Stojanac chose a career as a singer and actor. In 2019, he became known to a larger audience due to his role as Vince Dubois in the television series #LikeMe. In this role, he performed alongside Pommelien Thijs, Camille Dhont, and Francisco Schuster, among others.

In the fall of 2021, his first solo single, Vechten voor je, was released, which became a modest hit in Flanders. On 6 May 2022, his first album, Maksim, was released. The anlbum immediately entered number 1 in the Ultratop 200 Albums. In between, Stojanac appeared on television as host of The Voice Kids (together with An Lemmens) and as a participant in the second season of BV Darts on VTM, which he also won by defeating Hans Van Alphen in the final.

In 2023, Stojanac released two singles: "Onder invloed" and "Dat hadden wij moeten zijn" (a duet with Emma Heesters). Both singles achieved gold status in Flanders. In that same year, Stojanac won the first season of Tulpen uit Antwerpen on Play. He also participated in the program The Masked Singer, in which he was exposed as "Lion".

With "Ik wil dat je liegt", a duet with Hannah Mae, Stojanac achieved his first number 1 hit in the Flemish Ultratop 50 in 2024. The single was awarded double platinum and named winner of the VRT Summer Hit. For Stojanac, it also meant his breakthrough in the Netherlands, where the song reached eighth place in the Dutch Top 40. Later that year, his second album Dagdromer was released, which, like his debut album, entered number 1 on the Flemish album list. The song "Blote voeten" from his album Maksim was used in 2024 for the credits of the feature film Young Hearts.

In 2025, Stojanac participated in the television program Liefde voor muziek, in which he performed songs by Hooverphonic and Guus Meeuwis, among others. With Meeuwis, he later recorded the duet "Sparen voor de nacht", which became a hit in both Flanders and the Netherlands. In the fall of 2025, Stojanac, together with Niels Destadsbader, provided the new intro number for Thuis.

In 2026, Stojanac will return to The Voice Kids in the role of a vocal coach, alongside Camille Dhont, Metejoor, and Thibault Christiaensen.

== Discography ==
=== Albums ===
- MAKSIM - 2022
- Dagdromer - 2024
- Dagdromer (deluxe version) - 2025

=== Singles ===
- Vechten voor je - 2021
- Jongens huilen ook, toch? - 2021
- Als het uitkomt - 2021
- Alleen met mij - 2021
- Zonder mij - 2022
- Onder invloed - 2023
- Dat hadden wij moeten zijn (with Emma Heesters) - 2023
- Leef voor jou - 2024
- Ik wil dat je liegt (with Hannah Mae) - 2024
- Als ik voor jou kon kiezen - 2024
- Wie (with Tourist LeMC) - 2024
- Sparen voor de nacht (with Guus Meeuwis) - 2025
- Bij jou voel ik me thuis (with Niels Destadsbader) (opening for Thuis) - 2025
- Gister - 2025
