= De Revolutie! =

Single by K3
- Released: October 2008
- Recorded: 2008
- Genre: Dance-pop
- Label: Studio 100
- Songwriters: Miquel Wiels, A. Putte, P. Gillis
- Producer: Studio 100

K3 singles chronology
"Je mama ziet je graag" (2008)	"De Revolutie!" (2008)	"MaMaSé!" (2009)

"De Revolutie!" was the last single from Flemish/Dutch girl group K3 with first blonde member Kathleen Aerts. It was written by Miquel Wiels, A. Putte, and P. Gillis, and it was produced by Studio 100. The song premiered in 2008 in their 10th anniversary show. The song was supposed to be the leading single of their tenth album, but the album did not make it because Kathleen wanted to quit K3. However, a year later, when Josje Huisman was chosen to replace Kathleen, the song was rerecorded and put on the tenth album MaMaSé!.

The song was popular in Belgium and the Netherlands. It peaked at #14 in Netherlands.

== Music video ==
Originally, the music video was a dance video with the three girls wearing pink and dancing with kids. Later, it was a concert video from their 10th anniversary show.
