= Hannah Mae =

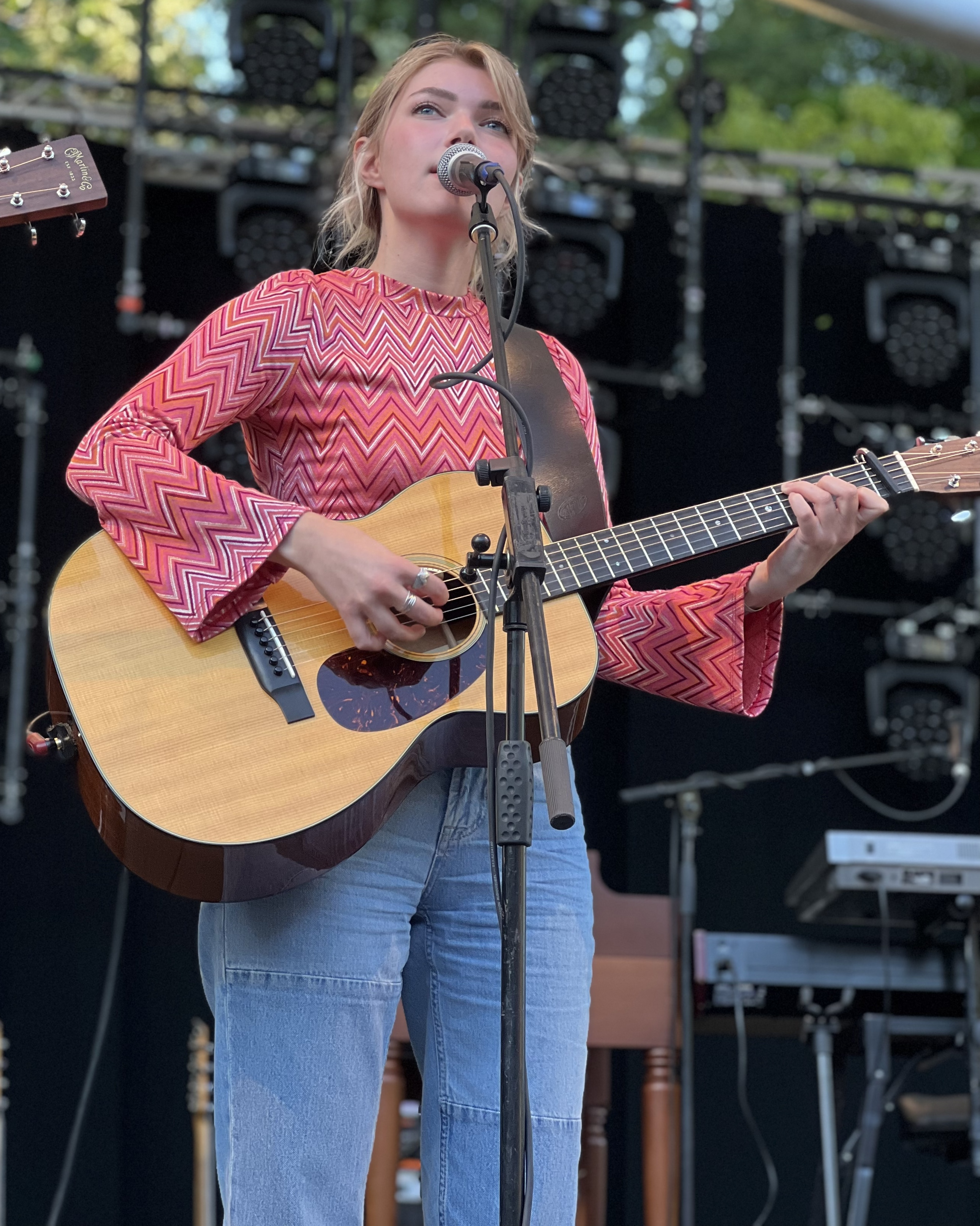
- Mae performing at the Zuiderpark in Den Haag in 2022

Background information
- Born: Hannah Schoonbeek; 16 November 1998 (age 28); Emmen, Netherlands
- Genres: Country; folk
- Instrument: Guitar
- Label: Spark Records
- Website: https://www.hannahmae.nl

Hannah Mae Schoonbeek (born 16 November 1998), known professionally as Hannah Mae, is a Dutch singer-songwriter from Emmen, Drenthe.

== Biography ==
Hannah Mae began writing songs when she was sixteen. Her song "Back to You" reached first place in the Tipparade in 2019 and would be used in an advertisement for the Dutch supermarket PLUS. During the filming of a local music program, she said that Ilse DeLange was a musical inspiration. Shortly after, DeLange signed her to her record label, Spark Records.

In 2021, after the COVID-19 lockdown had ended, Mae started her "Little Things Tour" through the Netherlands and released her first Dutch song "De kerkstraat". She decided soon after to only write songs in Dutch. In November 2022, she released "Wat wil je van mij", a duet with the Belgian singer Metejoor.

In November 2023, she released "Waterdicht", a personal song written for her mother which addresses topics of mental health. In the song, Mae emphasizes that showing emotion is not a weakness but rather a path to connection and empathy with others. The song reached number nine in the Dutch Top 40. In May 2024, she released "Ik wil dat je liegt" with Belgian singer Maksim, which won the Radio 2 Summer Hit award in Belgium. She participated in season 17 of Beste Zangers, which began airing in September 2024.

In 2026, she collaborated with Dutch rock band Bløf on the song "Ik ben niet meer bang", which was released on 27 March and lyrically discusses trust and feelings of safety.

== Discography ==
=== Studio albums ===
Title	Details	Peak chart positions		Certification
Title	Details	NLD	BEL (FL)	Certification
Rode Draad	Released: 7 February 2025; Label: Spark Records; Format: streaming, digital download	10	77	NVPI: Platinum

=== Singles ===
List of singles, with selected chart positions
Title	Year	Peak chart positions			Certification	Album
Title	Year	NLD Dutch Top 40	NLD Single Top 100	BEL (FL)	Certification	Album
"Back to You"	2019	—	—	—		Non-album single
"Little Things"	2020	—	—	—		Non-album single
"Wat wil je van mij" (with Metejoor)	2022	2	6	2	NVPI: Platinum	Rode Draad
"Zonder"	2023	—	—	—		Rode Draad
"Waterdicht"	2023	9	7	—	NVPI: Platinum	Rode Draad
"Ik wil dat je liegt" (with Maksim)	2024	8	18	1	NVPI: Gold	Rode Draad
"Rode draad"	2024	29	75	—		Rode Draad
"Mes In M'n Rug"	2024	—	75	—	NVPI: Gold	Non-album singles
"Wacht op mij"	2025	18	21	—		Non-album singles
"Ik ben niet meer bang" (with Bløf)	2026	—	60	—		Non-album singles
"Adem uit adem in"	2026	40	83	—		Non-album singles
