= The Voice Kids (Belgian TV series) =

Belgian music talent television show

- Genre: Reality television
- Created by: John de Mol
- Presented by: An Lemmens; Koen Wauters; Nora Gharib; Aaron Blommaert; Kürt Rogiers; Sieg De Doncker; Maksim Stojanac
- Judges: Sean Dhondt; Regi Penxten; Natalia; Slongs Dievanongs; Laura Tesoro; Josje Huisman; Gers Pardoel; K3; Metejoor; Duncan Laurence; Coely; Pommelien Thijs; Camille Dhont; Maksim Stojanac; Thibault Christiaensen
- Country of origin: Belgium
- Original language: Dutch
- No. of seasons: 8

Production
- Running time: 120 minutes

Original release
- Network: VTM
- Release: 5 September 2014 – present

Related
- The Voice (franchise)

The Voice Kids is a Dutch-language Belgian music talent show for aspiring singers aged 8 to 14, based on the concept of the show The Voice van Vlaanderen. It began airing on 5 September 2014 on VTM.

There are five different stages to the show: producers' auditions, blind auditions, battle / knockout rounds, sing-offs / semi-finals, and the final. The winners of the seven seasons have been: Mentissa Aziza, Jens Dolleslagers, Katarina Pohlodkova, Jade De Rijcke, Gala Aliaj, Karista Khan, and Sikudhani Wangui Mbugua.

The show was originally presented by An Lemmens. In 2022 she was joined by Koen Wauters. In 2023, Lemmens and Wauters departed with Nora Gharib and Aaron Blommaert being announced as their replacements.

The coaches for the upcoming eighth season are Metejoor, Camille Dhont, Maksim Stojanac, and Thibault Christiaensen. Coaches from previous seasons were Sean Dhondt, Regi Penxten, Natalia, Slongs, Josje Huisman, Laura Tesoro, Gers Pardoel, K3, Duncan Laurence, Coely, and Pommelien Thijs.

== Coaches and hosts ==
=== Hosts ===
The Voice Kids presenters
Presenter	Seasons							
Presenter	1	2	3	4	5	6	7	8
An Lemmens								
Koen Wauters								
Nora Gharib								
Aaron Blommaert								
Kürt Rogiers								
Sieg De Doncker								
Maksim Stojanac								

Key
Main presenter
Backstage presenter

=== Coaches gallery ===
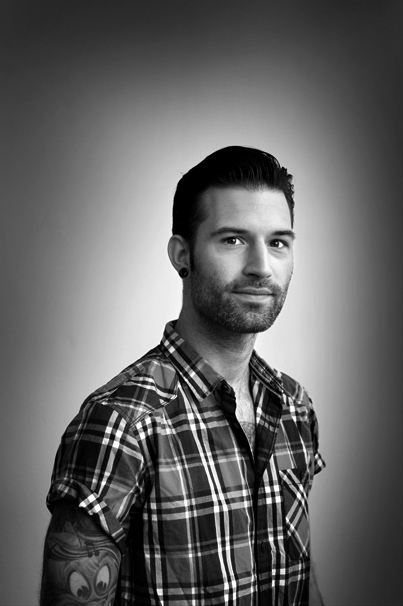
Sean Dhondt (1–5)

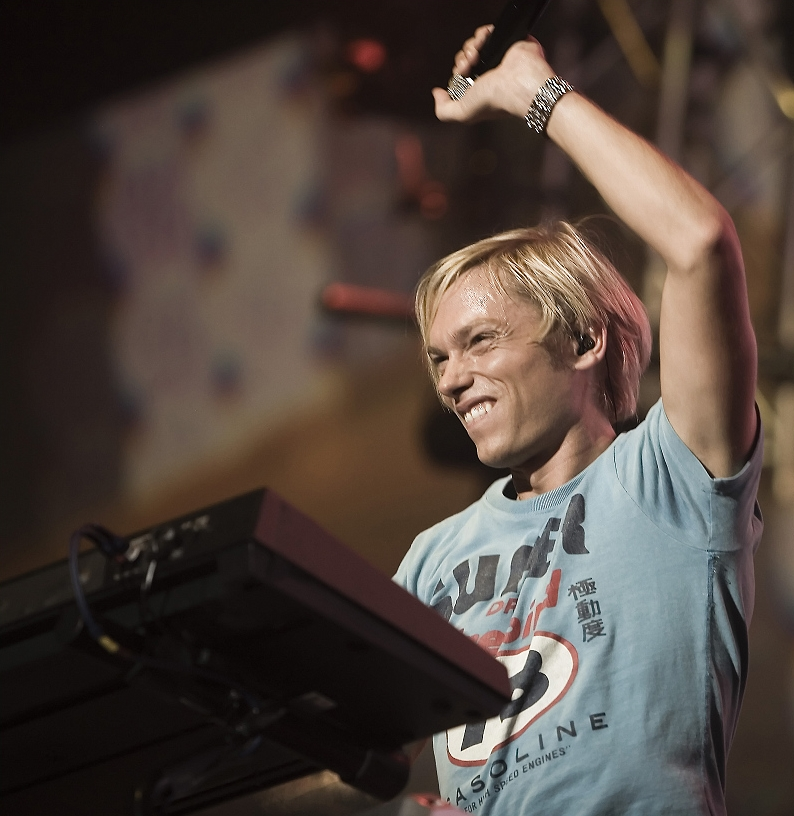
Regi Penxten (1)

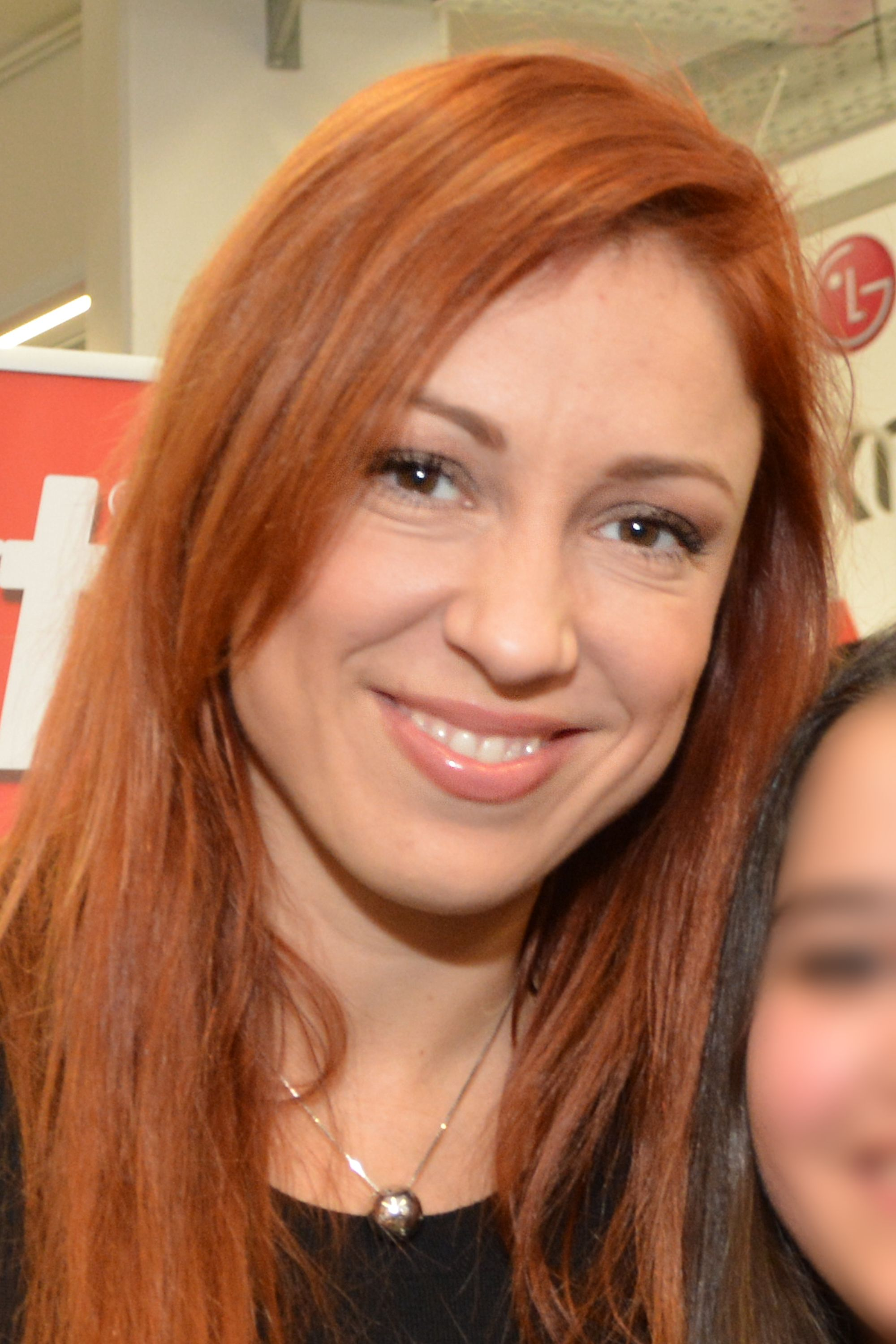
Natalia Druyts (1–2)

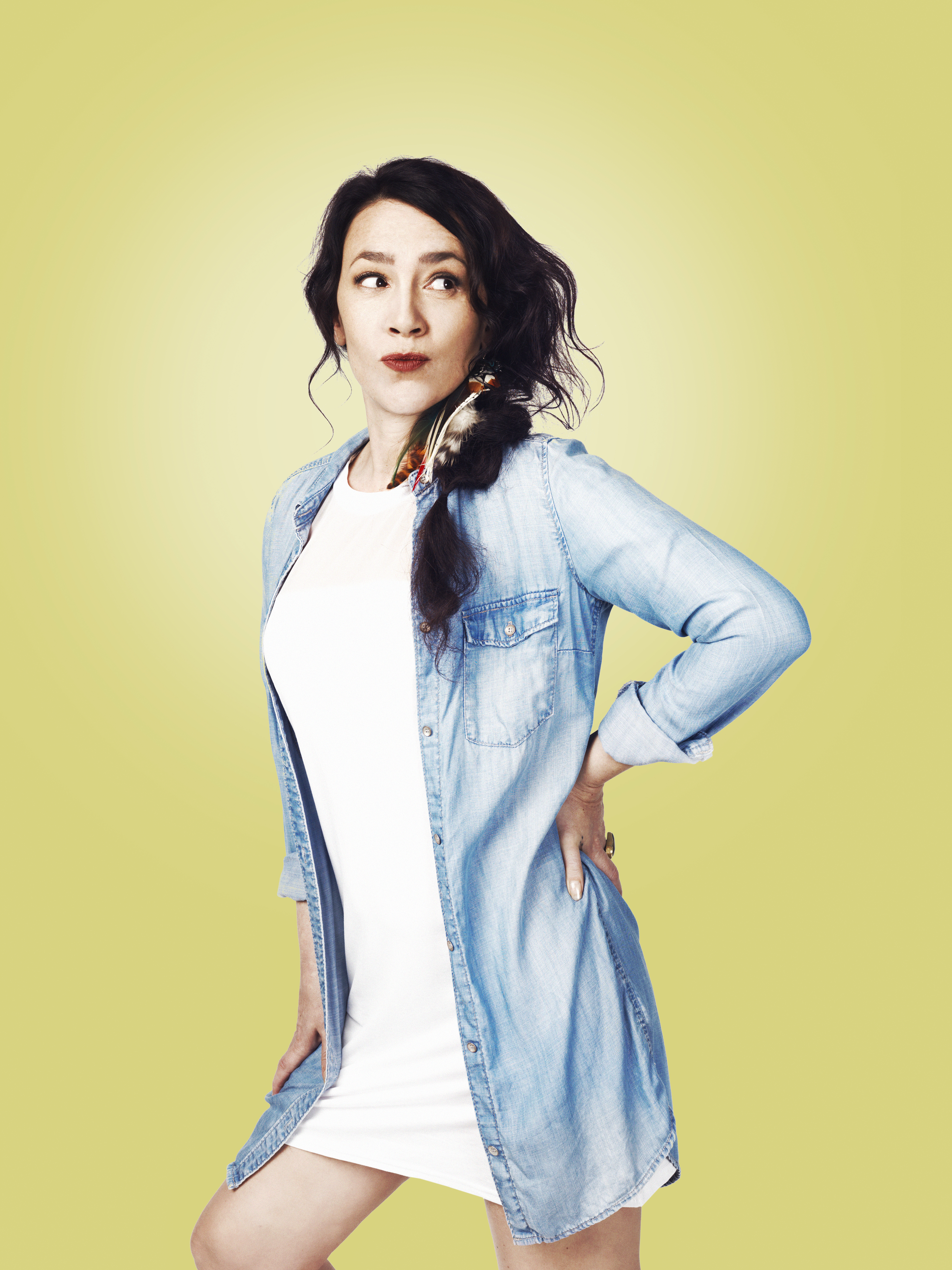
Slongs Dievanongs (2)

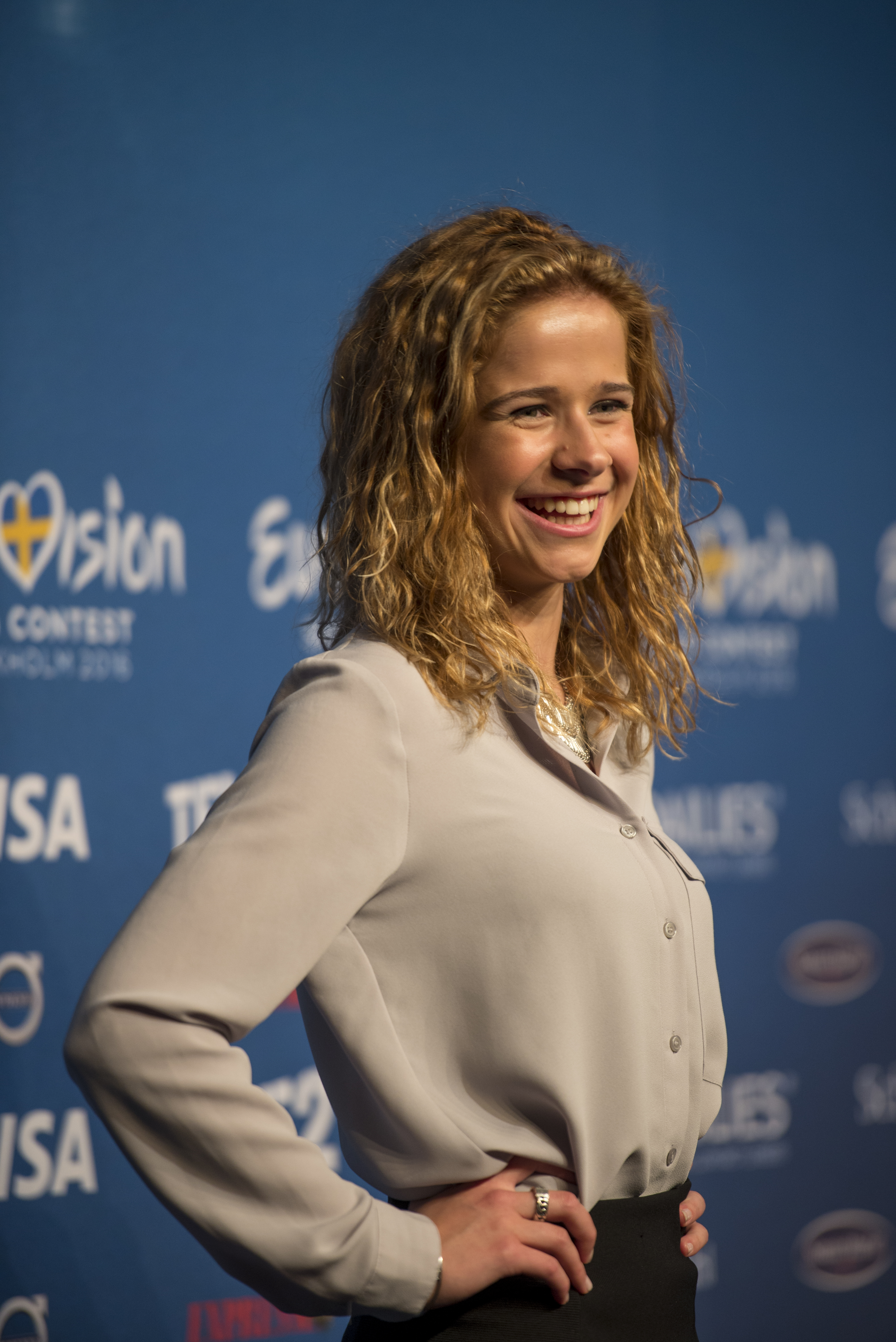
Laura Tesoro (3–7)

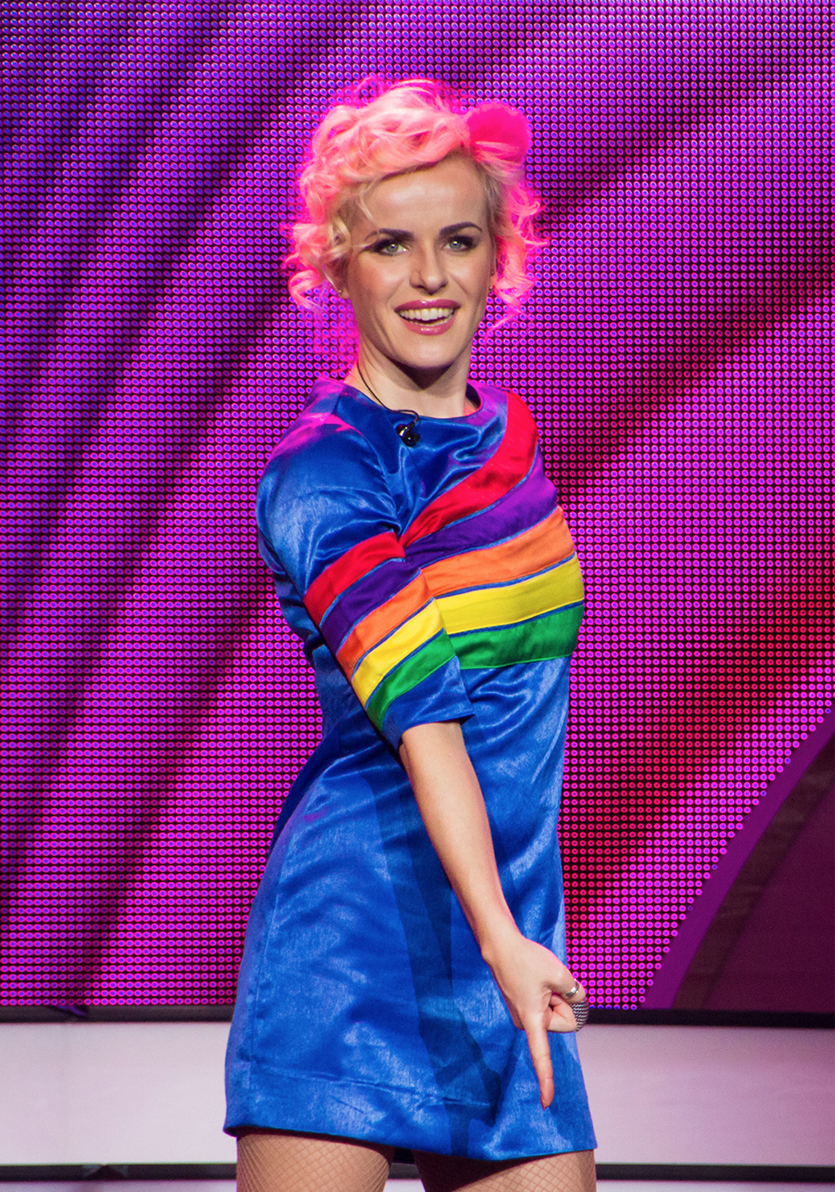
Josje Huisman (3)

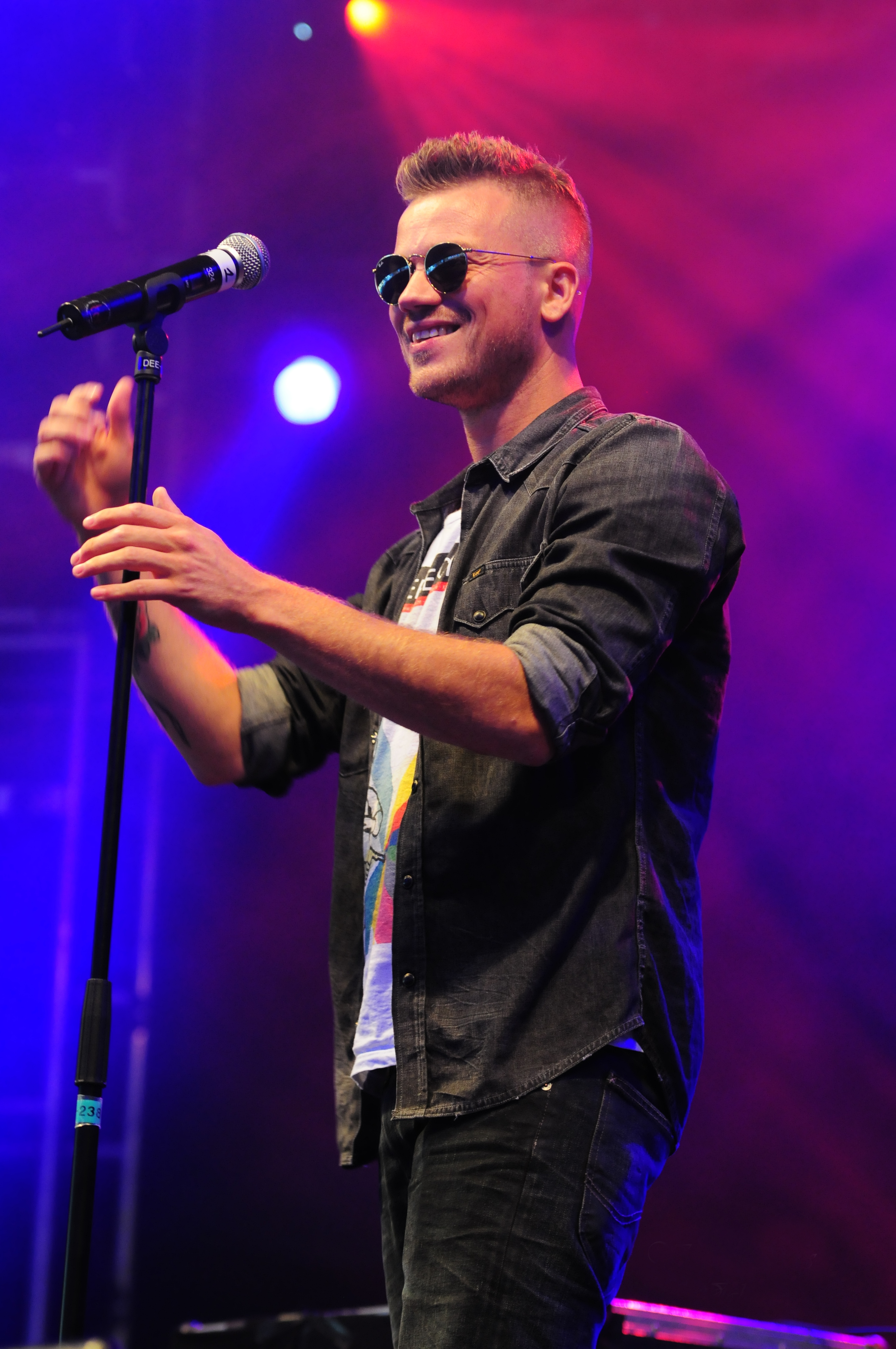
Gers Pardoel (4–5)

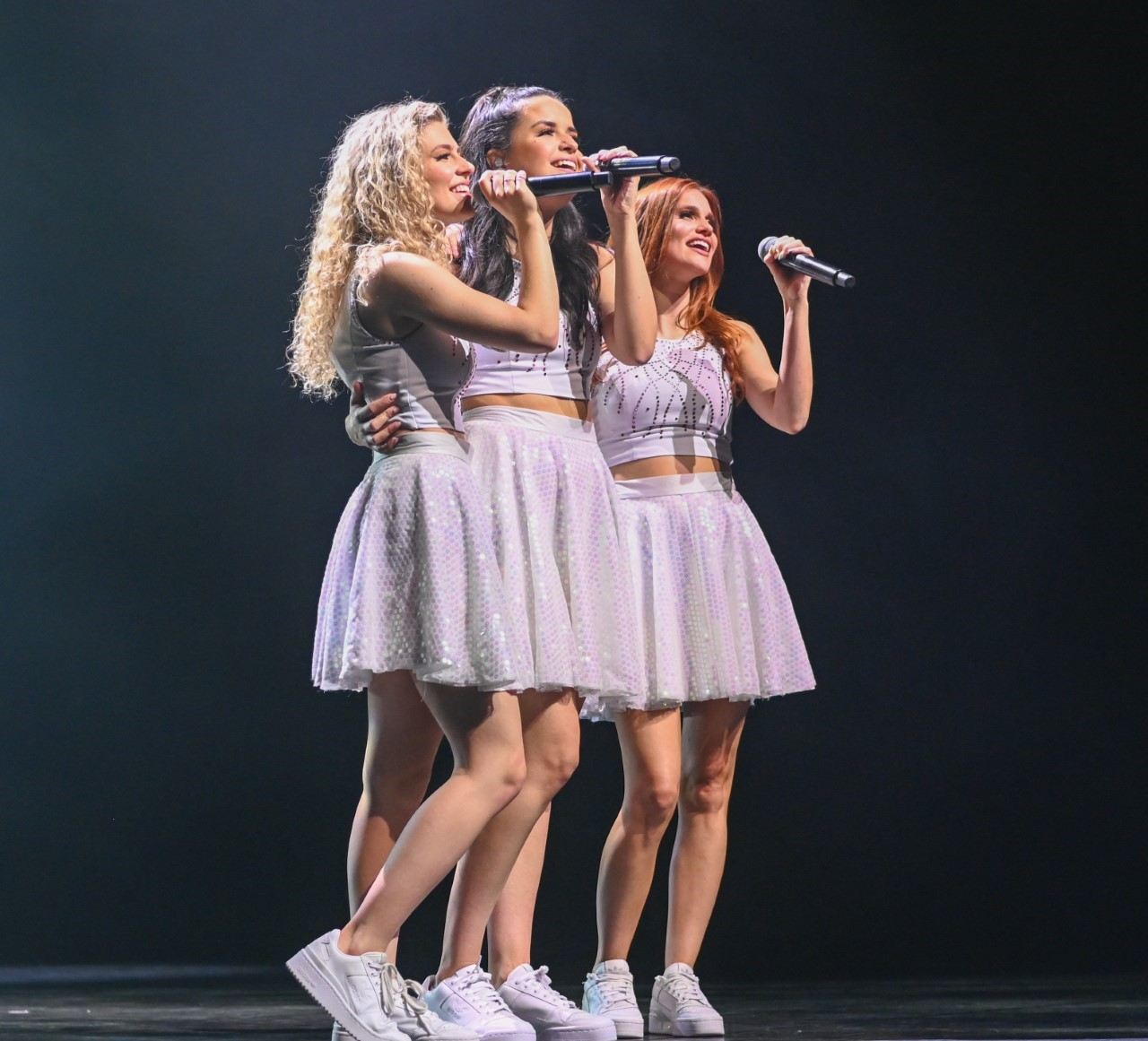
K3 (4–6)

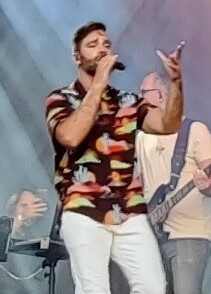
Metejoor (6–)

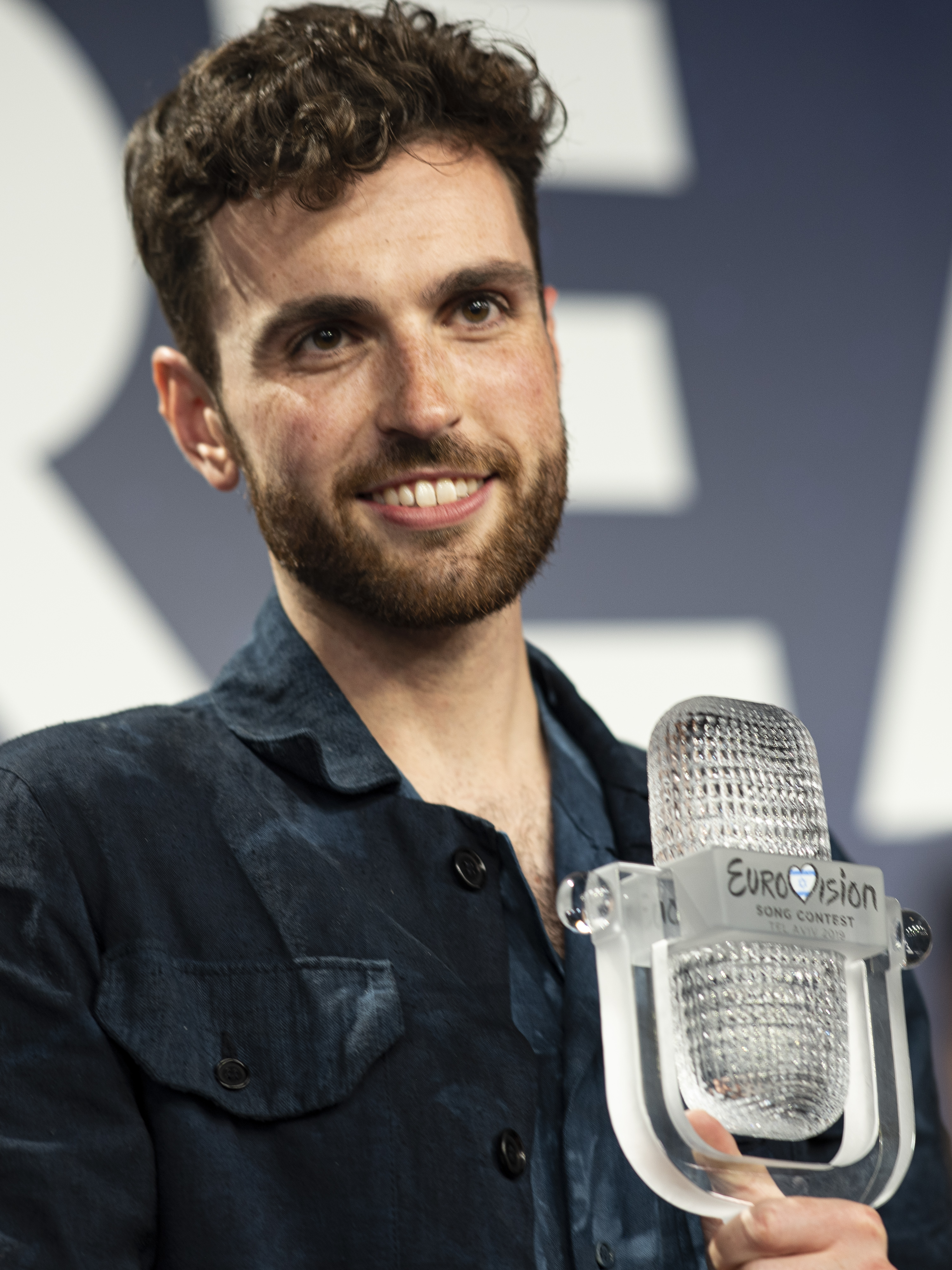
Duncan Laurence (6)

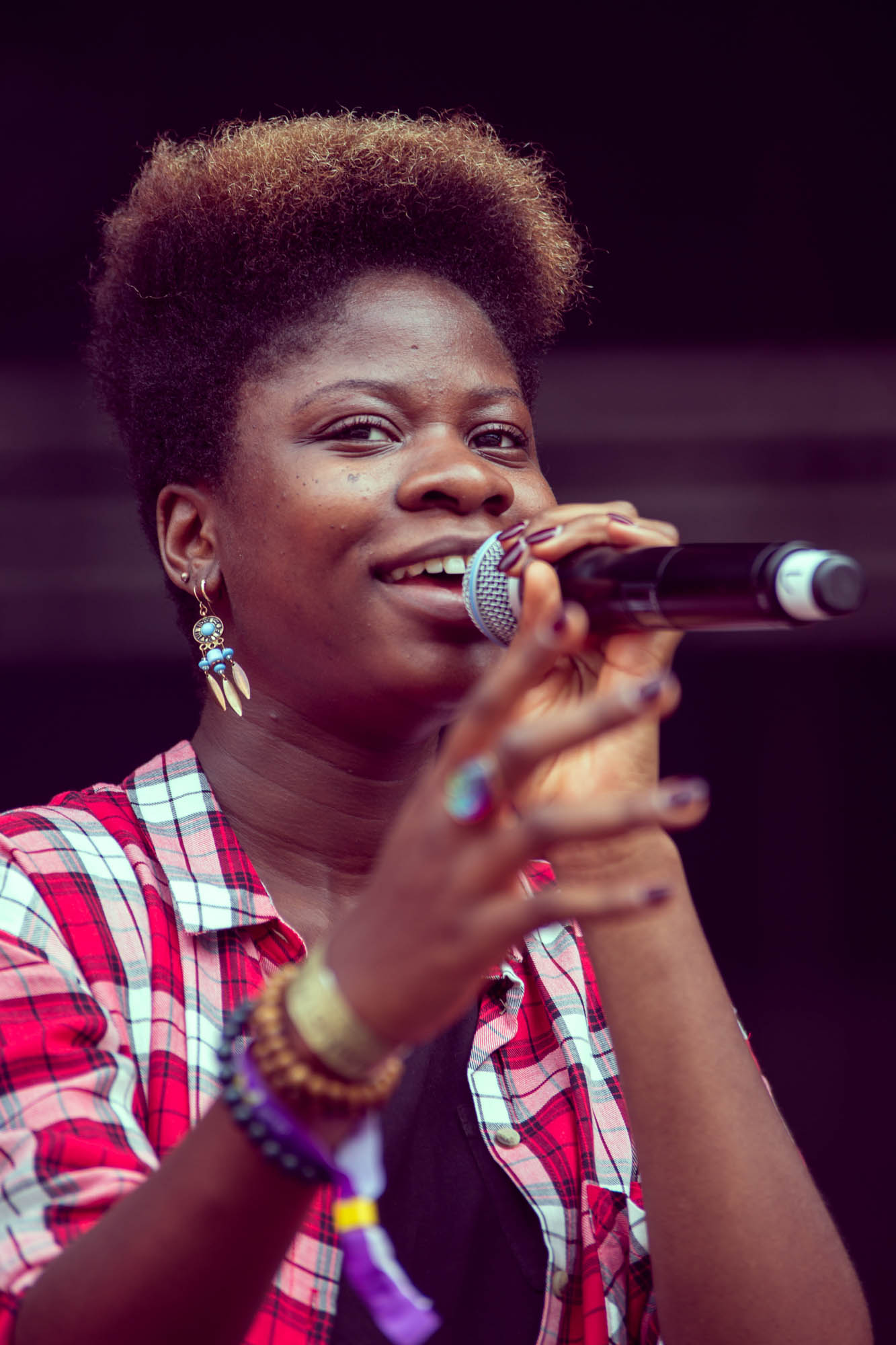
Coely (7)

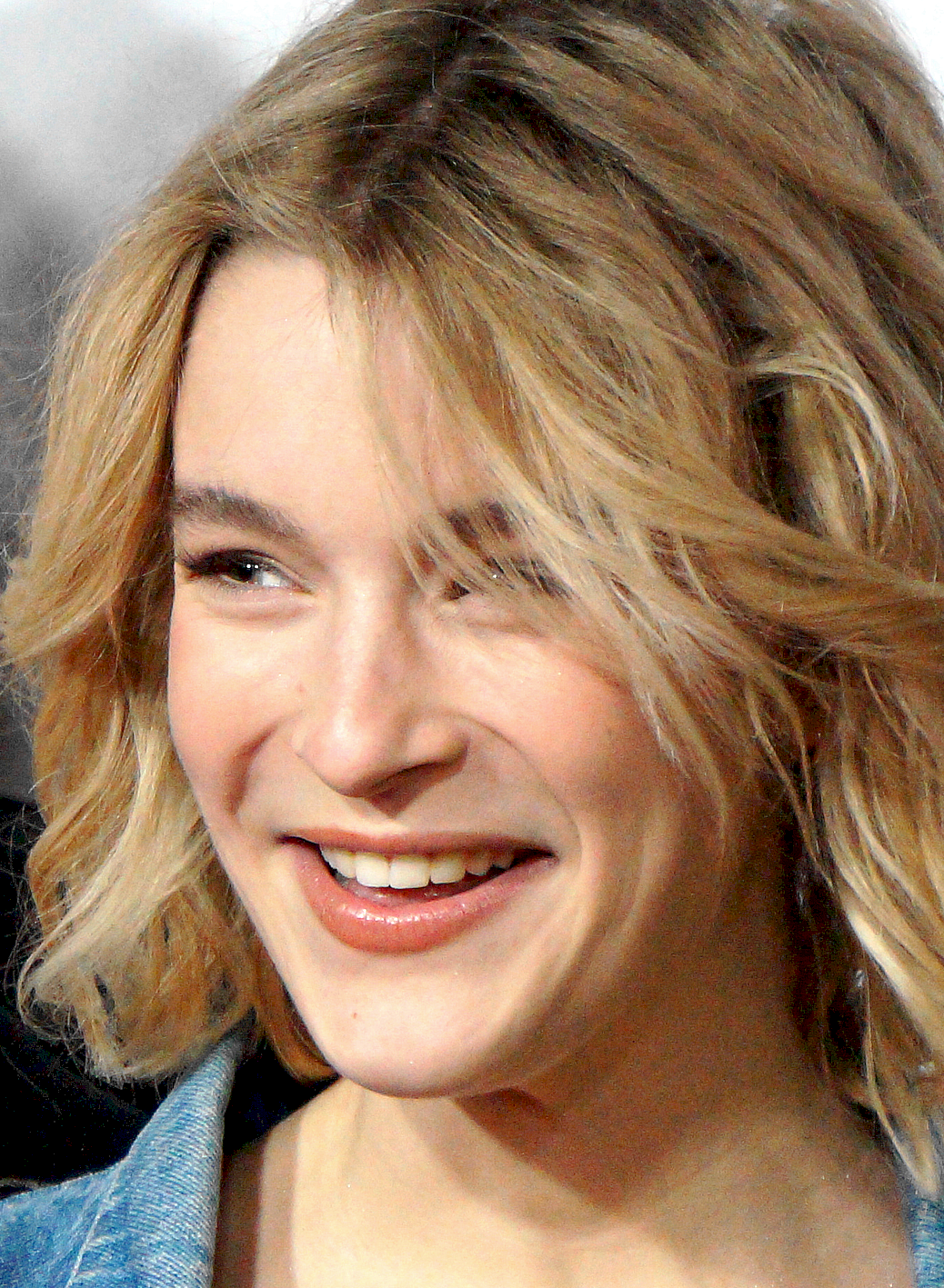
Pommelien Thijs (7)

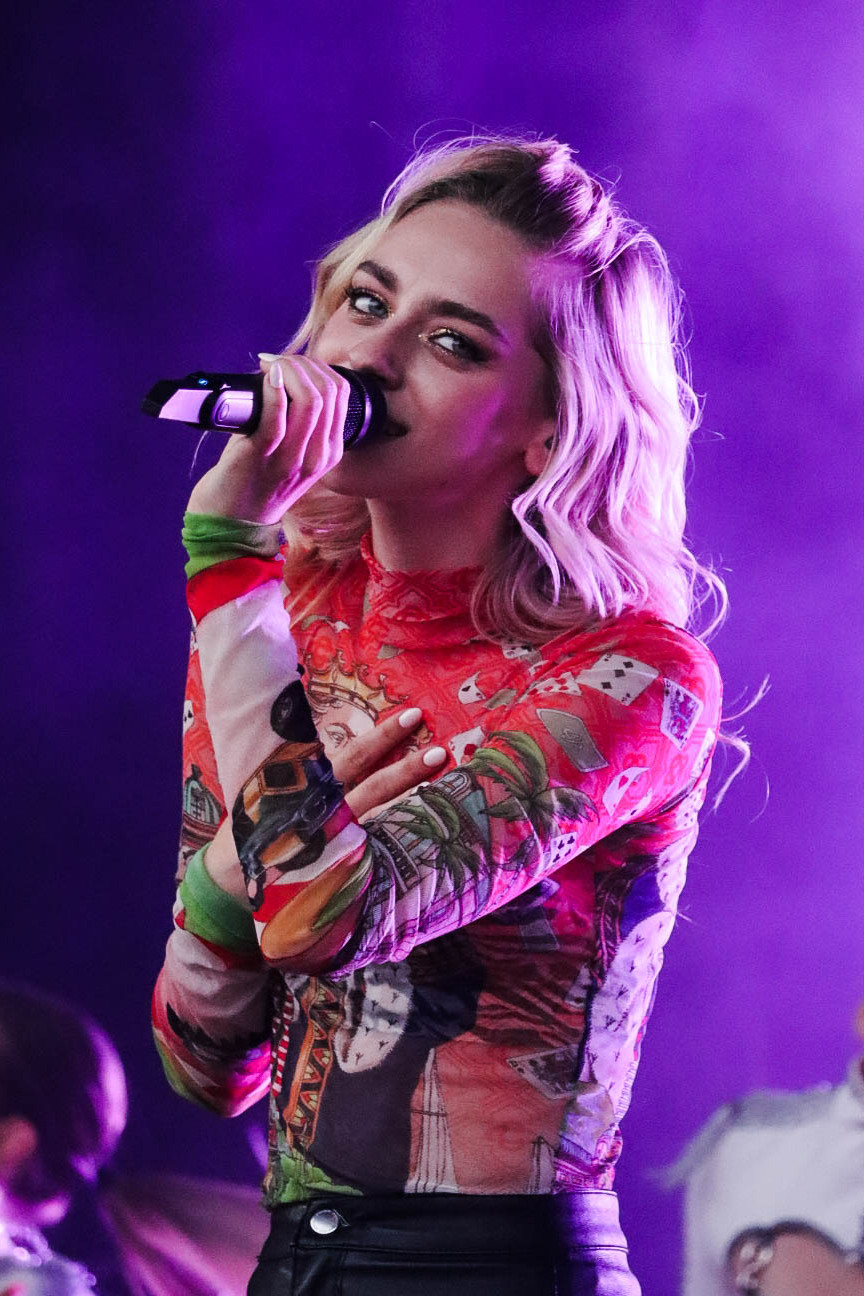
Camille Dhont (8–)

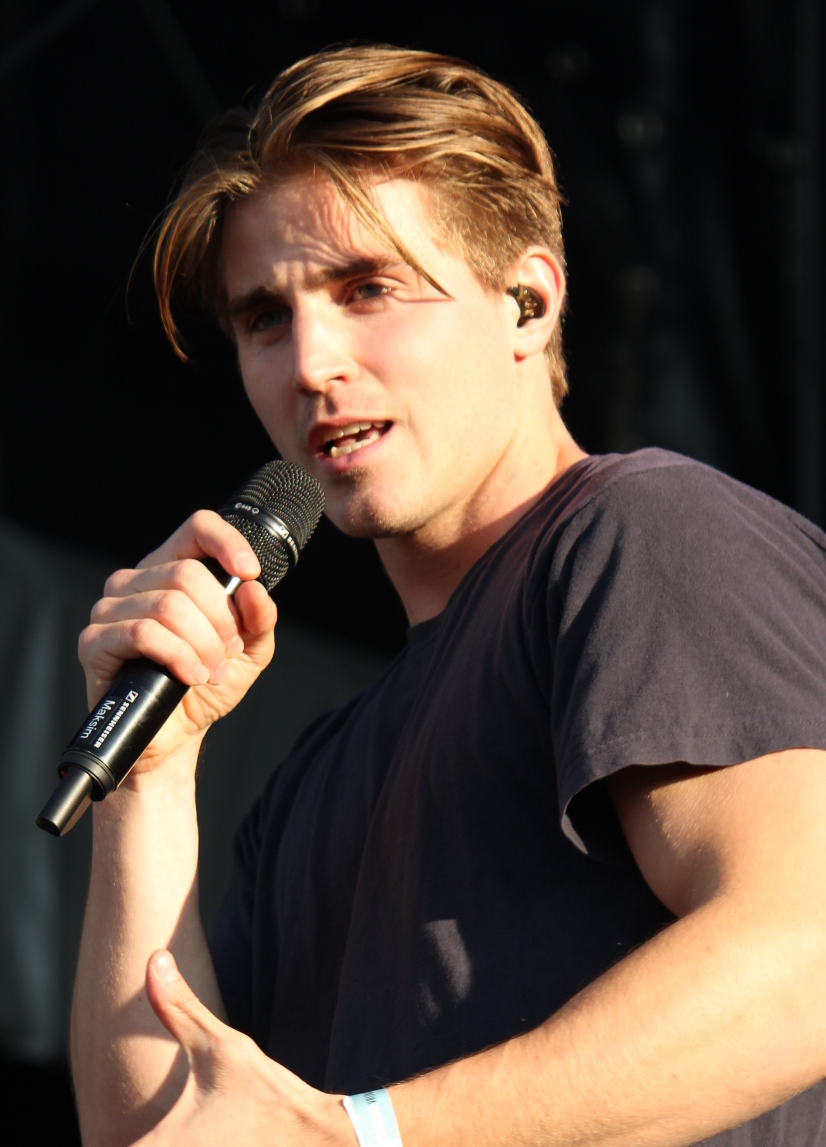
Maksim Stojanac (8–)

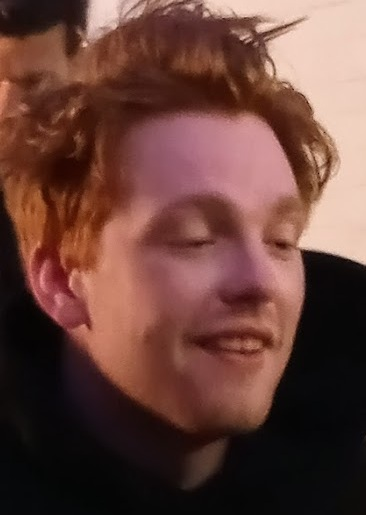
Thibault Christiaensen (8–)

=== Timeline of coaches ===
The Voice Kids coaches
Coach	Seasons							
Coach	1	2	3	4	5	6	7	8
Sean								
Natalia								
Regi								
Slongs								
Laura								
Josje								
Gers								
K3^{1}								
Metejoor								
Duncan								
Coely								
Pommelien								
Camille								
Maksim								
Thibault								

- ^1 Due to Klaasje Meijer's departure from the group, she was replaced by Julia Boschman after the fifth season.

=== Lineup of coaches ===
Coaches' line-up by chairs order
Season	Year	Coaches			
Season	Year	1	2	3	4
1	2014	Sean	Natalia	Regi	—N/a
2	2015–16	Natalia	Sean	Slongs	—N/a
3	2017	Laura	Sean	Josje	—N/a
4	2018	Gers	Laura	Sean	K3
5	2020	Gers	Laura	Sean	K3
6	2022	Metejoor	Laura	Duncan	K3
7	2023	Laura	Coely	Metejoor	Pommelien
8	2026	Metejoor	Maksim	Camille	Thibault

== Coaches and finalists ==
The box shows finalists of each team, the bold ones are the winners/topfinalist

- Winner
- Runner-up
- Third place
- Fourth place

Season	Sean Dhondt	Natalia Druyts	Regi Penxten	No fourth coach
1	Jens Broes; Juliette Van Damme	Mentissa Aziza; Otice Dury	Fiona Verbrugghe; Alessia De Simone	No fourth coach
Season	Natalia Druyts	Sean Dhondt	Slongs Dievanongs	No fourth coach
2	Josefien Derijcke; Julie Tilborghs	Jasmine McGuinness; Leeloo Gilbert	Jens Dolleslagers; Anke Huysentruyt	No fourth coach
Season	Laura Tesoro	Sean Dhondt	Josje Huisman	No fourth coach
3	Robin Jonckheere; Oona Caron	Tim Bostoen; Noralie Van Der Linden	Katarina Pohlodkova; Abobaker Rahman	No fourth coach
Season	Gers Pardoel	Laura Tesoro	Sean Dhondt	K3
4	Jade De Rijcke; Noa Claeys	Emma Franssens; Marilys Van der Hagen	Elisabeth Vergauwe; Soraya Brigui	Maëlle Moquet; Mary Arutunian
5	Max Atzmon; Sofia Stuyck	Veronika Bikarova; Justin Degryse	Gala Aliaj; Tiany Michiels	Mette-Marie Maes; Romina Pecceu
Season	Metejoor	Laura Tesoro	Duncan Laurence	K3
6	Marie-Émilie; Jinthe Moens	Gloria; J.A.P	Karista Khan; Lina Lasri	Sien van Glabeke; Anne Dexters
Season	Laura Tesoro	Coely	Metejoor	Pommelien Thijs
7	Ines Hanin; Ariona Hamzallari	Miriam Owusu-Banahene; Nisa Taspinar	Sofian Hachana; Sid Janssen	Sikudhani Wangui Mbugua; Lize Laekman
Season	Metejoor	Maksim Stojanac	Camille Dhont	Thibault Christiaensen
8	Upcoming season			

== Series overview ==
Teams color key
Artist from Team Natalia	Artist from Team Josje	Artist from Team Duncan
Artist from Team Regi	Artist from Team Laura	Artist from Team Metejoor
Artist from Team Sean	Artist from Team Gers	Artist from Team Coely
Artist from Team Slongs	Artist from Team K3	Artist from Team Pommelien

Flemish The Voice Kids series overview
Season	Aired	Winner	Runner-up	Third place	Fourth place	Winning coach	Presenter(s)
1	2014	Mentissa Aziza	Fiona Verbrugghe	Jens Broes	—N/a	Natalia Druyts	An Lemmens
2	2015–16	Jens Dolleslagers	Jasmine McGuinness	Josefien Derijcke	—N/a	Slongs Dievanongs	An Lemmens
3	2017	Katarina Pohlodkova	Tim Bostoen	Robin Jonckheere	—N/a	Josje Huisman	An Lemmens
4	2018	Jade De Rijcke	Elisabeth Vergauwe	Emma Franssens	Maëlle Moquet	Gers Pardoel	An Lemmens
5	2020	Gala Aliaj	Mette-Marie Maes	Max Atzmon	Veronika Bikarova	Sean Dhondt	An Lemmens
6	2022	Karista Khan	Gloria	Sien van Glabeke	Marie-Émilie	Duncan Laurence	Lemmens, Koen Wauters
7	2023	Sikudhani Wangui Mbugua	Miriam Owusu-Banahene	Sofian Hachana	Ines Hanin	Pommelien Thijs	Aaron Blommaert, Nora Gharib
8	2026	Upcoming season					Aaron Blommaert, Nora Gharib

== Seasons' synopsis ==
Winner
Runner-up
Third place
Fourth place
Eliminated in the Final
Eliminated in the Sing-offs/ Semi Final
Eliminated in the Battles / Knockouts

=== Season 1 (2014) ===
The inaugural season premiered on 5 September 2014 with Sean Dhondt, Natalia Druyts, and Regi Penxten as coaches. Mentissa Aziza from Team Natalia won the season finale a week before Halloween.

Coaches	Top 36 Kids			
Sean	Jens	Juliette	Arunee	Danai
Sean	Armin	Heda	Fé	Jonathan
Sean	Juliette	Ranya	Mevlyde	Mariam
Natalia	Mentissa	Otice	Camille	Suzanne
Natalia	Alicia	Améline	Flore	Bjarne
Natalia	Morgan	Tessa	Merel	Lisa
Regi	Fiona	Alessia	Emma	Seppe
Regi	Evy	Ebe	Leonore	Max
Regi	Isabella	Junia	Manon	Sam

=== Season 2 (2015-16) ===
Season 2 of The Voice Kids premiered on 20 November 2015 with Sean Dhondt and Natalia Druyts switching seats while Slongs Dievanongs replaced Regi Penxten. Jens Dolleslaeghers from Team Slongs won the season 2 finale at the beginning of 2016.

Coaches	Top 36 Kids			
Natalia	Josefien	Julie	Daria	Resa
Natalia	Precious	Britt	Anna	Ella
Natalia	Zita	Sharmy	Luana	Jemina
Sean	Jasmine	Leeloo	Pien	Serena
Sean	Kitana	Aurélie	Lore	Dioniza
Sean	Oscar	Romane	Tine	Hannabel
Slongs	Jens	Anke	Anneleen	Dina
Slongs	Anton	Kato	Aaron	Cecilia
Slongs	Felix	Samuel	Camille	Lola

=== Season 3 (2017) ===
Season 3 of The Voice Kids premiered on 14 April 2017 with Sean Dhondt as a returning coach while Eurovision Song Contest 2016 star Laura Tesoro and former K3 member Josje Huisman replacing Natalia Druyts and Slongs Dievanongs, respectively. Katarina Pohlodkova from Team Josje won the season 3 finale in June.

Coaches	Top 36 Kids			
Laura	Robin	Oona	Emma	Jonathan
Laura	Bo	Jill	Maud	Arman
Laura	Cindy	Nathan	One	Nina
Sean	Tim	Noralie	Babs	Stijn
Sean	Jill	Julie	Angel Pink	Raphaëlla
Sean	Moira	Lien	Jerko	Romy
Josje	Katarina	Abu	Pauline	Pauline
Josje	Julliette	Delano	Flore	Merlijn
Josje	Lotte	Senne	Jens	Sofia

=== Season 4 (2018) ===
Season 4 of The Voice Kids premiered on 14 September 2018, and for the first time, had four coaches instead of three. Sean Dhondt and Laura Tesoro returned as coaches while Gers Pardoel and K3 replaced the latter's former member Josje Huisman. Jade De Rijcke from Team Gers won the season 4 finale in November.

Coaches	Top 48 Kids			
Gers	Jade	Noa	Lindsy	Victoria
Gers	Laura	Kato	Jósephine	Indy
Gers	Lotte	Sari	Louise	Stien
Laura	Emma	Marilys	Charlotte	Kyle
Laura	Lauren	Hanne	Eva	Evi
Laura	Mamy	Noor	Ricardo	Silvie
Sean	Elisabeth	Soraya	Helena	Karry
Sean	Eva	Anna	Emma	Billy
Sean	Nathan	Latif	Jolien	Lisa
K3	Maëlle	Mary	Ebe	Jools
K3	Aja	Axelle	Anaïs	Kylan
K3	Amber	Helena	Lola	Luca

=== Season 5 (2020) ===
Season 5 of The Voice Kids premiered on 7 February 2020 but was interrupted for several months due to the COVID-19 pandemic in Belgium. All four coaches from the previous season returned, and the live shows commenced in August, with Gala Aliaj from Team Sean winning the season 5 finale on 11 September.

Coaches	Top 48 Kids			
Gers	Max	Sofia	Aenea	Klara
Gers	Elle	Lauren	Daan	Dilara
Gers	Fleur	Leslie	Endrew	Lentel
Laura	Veronika	Justin	Femke	Nabil
Laura	Caitlin	Connor	Anouk	Aurelie
Laura	Inneke	Stan	Chiana	Sanna
Sean	Gala	Tiany	Liza	Zita
Sean	Tara	Grace	Jen	Claire
Sean	Tiana	Tamsen	Jill	Thalia
K3	Mette-Marie	Romina	Elisabeth	Matisse
K3	Naëma	Ashley	Sarah	Chaya
K3	Sofia	Nele	Zita	Fie

=== Season 6 (2022) ===
Season 6 of The Voice Kids premiered on 25 March 2022. Laura Tesoro and K3 returned as coaches, while Metejoor and Eurovision Song Contest 2019 winner Duncan Laurence replaced Gers Pardoel and Sean Dhondt, respectively. Karista Khan from Team Duncan won the season 6 finale in May.

Coaches	Top 49 Kids			
Metejoor	Marie-Émilie	Jinthe	Zita	Maïté
Metejoor	Cara	Elise	Romy	Lise
Metejoor	Sien & Lena	Louis	Benne	Amelie
Laura	Gloria	J.A.P.	Lena	Samuel
Laura	Emma	Solara	Jools	Elise
Laura	Juliette	Marit	Lize	Eldiona
Duncan	Karista	Lina	Isis Lilja	Finn
Duncan	Fleur	Sofian	Renée	Ayco
Duncan	Marthe	Noor	Amira	Lola
Duncan	Floris			
K3	Sien	Anne	Naomi	Lars
K3	Emma	Elianice	Gaëlle	Elise
K3	Julie	Nienke	Eloïse	Juliette

=== Season 7 (2023) ===
Season 7 of The Voice Kids premiered on 15 September 2023. Laura Tesoro and Metejoor returned as coaches, while Coely and Pommelien Thijs replaced Duncan Laurence and K3, respectively. Sikudhani Wangui Mbugua from Team Pommelien won the season 7 finale on 24 November.

Coaches	Top 48 Kids			
Laura	Ines	Ariona	Milena	Sipho
Laura	Nina & Fien	Ella	Camille	Yanaika
Laura	Fé	Milà	Estée	Victoria
Coely	Miriam	Nisa	Frauke	Felix
Coely	Josefien	Eline	Annabel	Disha
Coely	Sam	Laurence	Tiana	Aurora
Metejoor	Sofian	Sid	Ezra	Marieke
Metejoor	Eliisa	Céleste	Lars	Binke
Metejoor	Maud	Luna	Mirko	Abigail
Pommelien	Sikudhani	Lize	Diene	Dominika
Pommelien	Saar	Claire	Senta	Alpha Nathan
Pommelien	Olivia	Nisa	Lise	Louise

=== Season 8 (2026) ===
Season 8 of The Voice Kids will premiere in 2026. On 22 December 2025, it was announced that of the previous season's coaches, only Metejoor would return. In the meantime, Laura Tesoro, Coely, and Pommelien Thijs were replaced by debuting coaches Camille Dhont, Thibault Christiaensen and Maksim Stojanac, who also featured as a backstage presenter in the sixth season. The season will remain hosted by Aaron Blommaert and Nora Gharib.

Coaches	Top TBA Kids
Metejoor	
Maksim	
Camille	
Thibault	
