= Lift You Up (disambiguation) =

Lift You Up is a Belgian reality talent show for the Flemish region of Belgium.

Lift You Up may also refer to:

- "Lift You Up", a song by Danny Brown from Stardust, 2025
- "Lift You Up", a song by Delta Heavy from Only in Dreams, 2019
- "Lift You Up", a 2024 single by Jessie Ware featuring Romy
- "Lift You Up", a song by TobyMac from This Is Not a Test, 2015
