= De politie =

"De Politie"

Single by K3

from the album MaMaSe!
- Released: December 2009
- Recorded: 2009
- Genre: Pop
- Length: 3:20
- Label: Studio 100
- Songwriter(s): Miquel Wiels, A. Putte, P. Gillis
- Producer(s): Studio 100

K3 singles chronology
"MaMaSé!" (2009)	"De Politie" (2009)	"Handjes Draaien" (2010)

"De Politie" is the second single released from Flemish/Dutch girl group K3' tenth studio album MaMaSé!. It was written by Miquel Wiels, A. Putte, and P. Gillis. The producer was Studio 100. The song premiered in October 2009 on the reality television show K2 Zoekt K3, which was the search for a new third K3 member (Kathleen Aerts had left back in March). It wasn't released as a single but only as a download. The song was released in Belgium in December 2009. It was released in the Netherlands in February 2010.

== Music video ==
In the music video the girls dance in their police outfits and catch a bad guy. The video was filmed a week after Josje won K2 zoekt K3.
