= K3 Kan Het! =

Televisionprogram from belgium

- Genre: Family/Children
- Created by: Gert Verhulst; Hans Bourlon
- Directed by: Steven Segers; Jeroen De Greef
- Starring: Karen Damen; Kristel Verbeke; Josje Huisman
- Theme music composer: Miquel Wiels
- Opening theme: K3 Kan Het!
- Composer: K3
- Countries of origin: Belgium; Netherlands
- Original language: Dutch
- No. of seasons: 2
- No. of episodes: 26

Production
- Producer: Anja Van Mensel

Original release
- Network: Belgium:Studio 100 TV vtmKzoom Netherlands:RTL Telekids
- Release: 3 May 2014 – 2015

K3 Kan Het! is a series with the Flemish girlsband K3. In this series the girls are searching for adventures with their fans, where they make the wish of their fans come true. There were 2 seasons aired with 13 episodes each. The first episode was aired on 3 May 2014.

== Plot ==
Karen, Kristel and Josje make the wishes of the kids come true. In every episode they fill three wishes, one by Karen, one by Kristel and one by Josje. Mostly it is something with adventure like a helicopter flight or training dogs, but sometimes it's an easy wish like being famous for one day.

== Cast ==
- Karen Damen
- Kristel Verbeke
- Josje Huisman
- Voice-over = Kobe Van Herwegen

== Crew ==
- Producer: Anja Van Mensel
- Concept: Gert Verhulst and Hans Bourlon
- Creative Producer: Sven Duym
- Executive Producer: Tinne Liipens
