= Sean Dhondt =

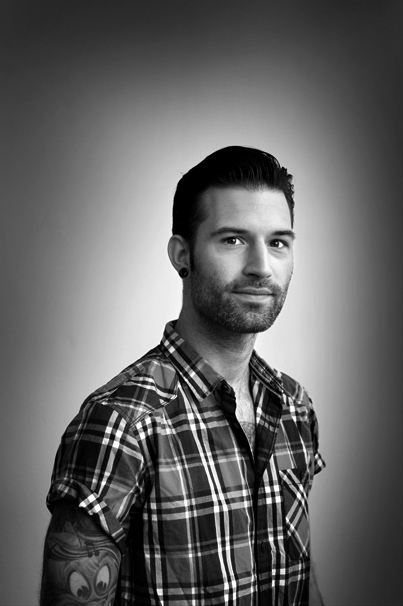
- Sean Dhondt

Background information
- Birth name: Sean Aloys Simonne Dhondt
- Born: 13 February 1984 (age 41); Sint-Niklaas, East Flanders, Belgium
- Genres: Pop-punk; Punk rock
- Occupations: Musician; radio personality; television presenter
- Years active: 2003–present

Sean Dhondt (born 13 February 1984) is a Belgian musician and presenter. He became known as the singer of the Belgian pop punk group Nailpin from 2001 until 2009 and as a video jockey on channels TMF and JIM. He has also been the lead vocalist of the Manoeuvres (2014–2019) and a presenter on VTM and Qmusic.

== Biography ==
=== Music ===
Sean Dhondt started his career as musician in 2003 as a drummer of Belgian punk band Nailpin. He became the new lead vocalist of the group in 2006 after the departure of Niko Van Driessche. That year Nailpin released their second album. The single "They Don't Know" (first recorded by Kirsty MacColl in 1979 and later, in 1983, a hit for Tracey Ullman), released in 2007, peaked at number 6 in the Belgian Ultratop 50. This single was one of Nailpin's greatest hits. After a third album, III, released in 2008 and a tour in 2009, the band took an indefinite hiatus. A few years later it became clear that there were no longer any plans to restart Nailpin.

After Nailpin he made some sporadic solo work such as singing the theme song of children's channel vtmKzoom, the theme song of the youth series De 5eboog and the vocals for the single Hold You by Dimaro. In 2014 he became the lead vocalist of the newly launched group Maneuvers.

In 2020 he was a singer in the VTM program Liefde voor muziek.

=== Television ===
In 2005 he became a veejay at TMF Flanders, presenting the programs Hitzone and Most Played Top 20. He later became a VJ at JIM, where he presented a daily afternoon program alongside Eline De Munck. He also got his own late night talk show, titled Sean Late Night. In the summer of 2015 he said goodbye to JIM to present on radio station Qmusic.

In the spring of 2011, Dhondt was featured as the host of the 2BE program The Ultimate Dance Battle. Later that year, he became the permanent co-presenter of An Lemmens on VTM during the live shows of The Voice van Vlaanderen, a role he also retained in the 2013 and 2014 editions. In the meantime, from the end of 2011 to the end of 2012, he was one of the regular reporters of the VTM magazine Voor de Show, he presented a second season of The Ultimate Dance Battle in 2012 and in 2014 he was one of the regular coaches in the children's talent show The Voice Kids. In 2020 he did that for the fifth time.[2] During the summer of 2016, together with Sam De Bruyn, he presented the music festival magazine Festivalitis on 2BE. In the spring of 2017, Dhondt and Rik van de Westelaken presented the seventh season of Peking Express on Q2. In 2018 he presented the Flemish program Boxing Stars.

He replaced Koen Wauters in the Snackmasters program in 2020 after Wauters contracted COVID-19. That year he also appeared in the program Een echte job on VTM. Dhondt was also seen on VTM in the sixth season of Liefde voor muziek.

== Radio ==
At the end of August 2015, Dhondt started presenting The BSMNT on Qmusic. The first season of the program ran until the end of June 2016 and was presented by Dhondt together with Marcia Bwarody. The second season, with Vincent Fierens as Dhondt's new co-presenter, was broadcast from the end of August 2016 to the end of June 2017. In the fall of 2017, Dhondt presented his own radio program on Sundays between 10 a.m. and 12 noon.
