= Mentissa (singer) =

Belgian singer and songwriter

Mentissa Aziza
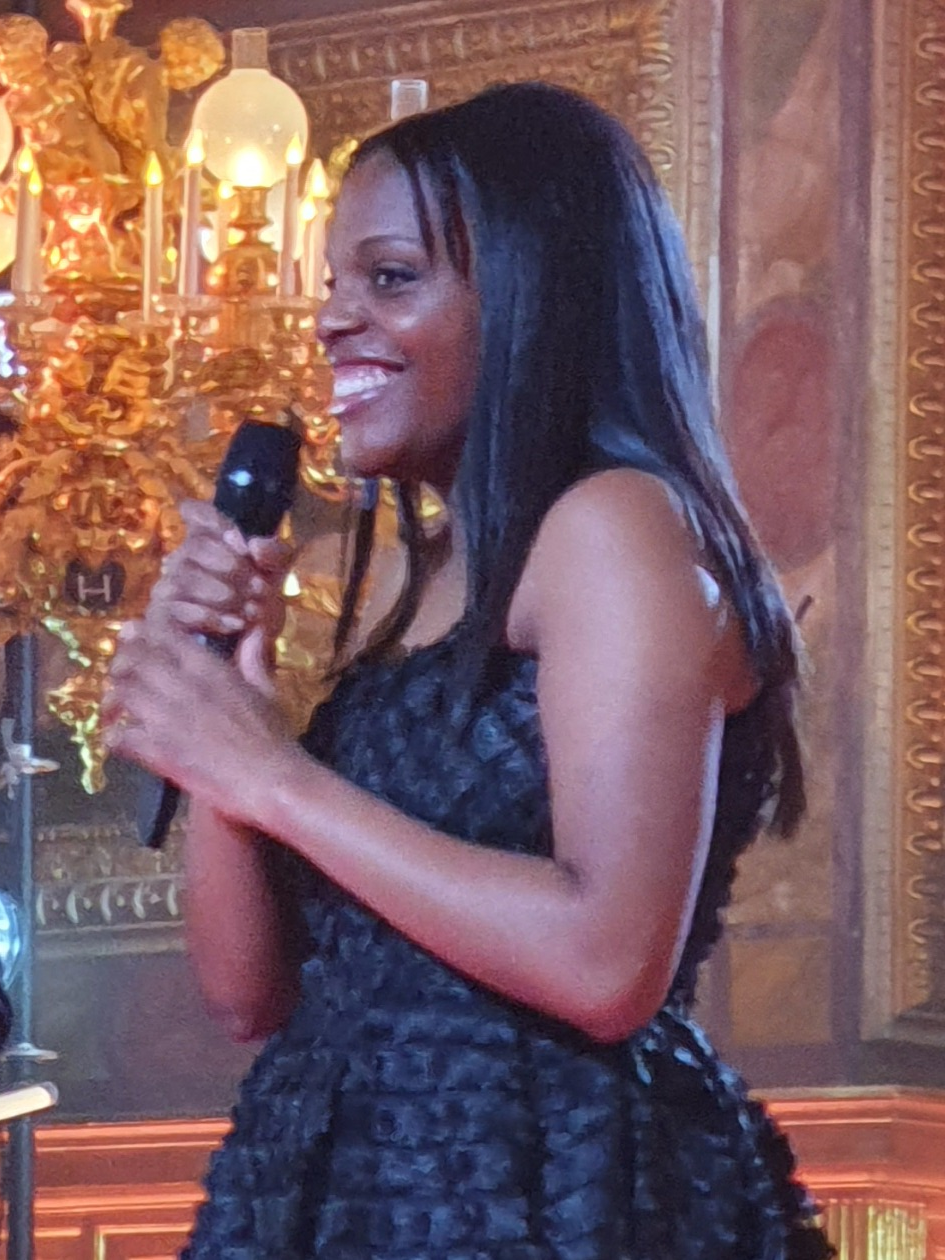
- Mentissa in 2022

Background information
- Also known as: Mentissa Mpatha Ngandu
- Born: 4 April 1999 (age 27); Ixelles, Belgium
- Origin: Denderleeuw, Belgium
- Genres: Pop; R&B
- Occupations: Singer; songwriter
- Years active: 2014–present
- Label: Tôt ou Tard
- Website: mentissaofficiel.com

Mentissa Eleonore Aziza (born 4 April 1999), known mononymously as Mentissa, is a Belgian singer and songwriter. She is known for winning the first season of The Voice Kids in Flanders, and for her participation in the tenth season of The Voice : La plus belle voix in France.

== Early life and education ==
Mentissa Aziza was born on 4 April 1999 in Ixelles, Brussels-Capital Region to parents of Congolese descent. Raised only by her mother, she grew up and attended secondary school in Dutch-speaking Denderleeuw, East Flanders. She later studied at the Karel de Grote University of Applied Sciences and Arts in Antwerp.

== Career ==
Mentissa developed an interest for singing at the age of 12. In 2014, she was a participant in the first season of The Voice Kids in Flanders. She joined the team of Natalia Druyts after her blind audition, and went on to win the competition.

In 2018 and 2019, Mentissa participated in the ninth season of The Voice of Holland, in which she reached the 'Knockouts' round as part of team Lil' Kleine. Two years later, in 2021, she entered the French version of The Voice franchise, finishing in the top 4 as part of team Vianney.

The Voice performances and results
Version	Season	Round	Song	Original artist	Result
Flanders (Kids)	1st (2014)	Blind Auditions	"I Want You Back"	The Jackson 5	Joined team Natalia
Flanders (Kids)	1st (2014)	The Battles	"Feeling Good"	Nina Simone	Advanced
Flanders (Kids)	1st (2014)	Final	"I've Got the Music in Me"	The Kiki Dee Band	Advanced
Flanders (Kids)	1st (2014)	Final	"The Greatest Love of All"	Whitney Houston	Winner
Netherlands	9th (2018–19)	Blind Auditions	"Perfect"	Ed Sheeran	Joined team Lil' Kleine
Netherlands	9th (2018–19)	The Battles	"Stuck"	Stacie Orrico	Advanced
Netherlands	9th (2018–19)	The Knockouts	"Beneath Your Beautiful"	Labrinth feat. Emeli Sandé	Eliminated
France	10th (2021)	Blind Auditions	"New Rules"	Dua Lipa	Joined team Vianney
France	10th (2021)	The Battles	"Freedom"	Beyoncé	Advanced
France	10th (2021)	The Knockouts	"Un point c'est toi"	Zazie	Advanced
France	10th (2021)	The Cross-Battles	"Chandelier"	Sia	Advanced
France	10th (2021)	Semi-Final	"Pour ne pas vivre seul"	Dalida	Advanced
France	10th (2021)	Final	"We Are the World"	USA for Africa	3rd–4th place
France	10th (2021)	Final	"Derrière le brouillard"	Grand Corps Malade and Louane	3rd–4th place

In October 2021, she joined the record label Tôt ou Tard. The airplay of the song "Et bam" on radio launched her career. Her debut album, La Vingtaine, was released on 18 November 2022. Mentissa opened for Vianney at the Olympia on 24, 25 and 26 November 2022, and embarked on her first tour in February 2023.

In 2024, she became a coach in the eleventh season of The Voice Belgique, alongside Beverly Jo Scott, Christophe Willem and Hatik. She was also announced as one of eight participants in Eurosong 2025, the Belgian national selection for the Eurovision Song Contest 2025, with the song "Désolée". The song was co-written by Vianney.

== Personal life ==
Mentissa is fluent in both Dutch and French, and sings mostly in French. She lives in Paris.

== Discography ==
=== Studio albums ===
Title	Year	Peak chart positions		
Title	Year	FRA	BEL (FL)	BEL (WA)
La Vingtaine	2021	46	160	34
Enfants difficiles	2026	100	—	3

=== Singles ===
Title	Year	Peak chart positions			Album
Title	Year	FRA	BEL (FL)	BEL (WA)	Album
"Et bam"	2021	49	—	43	La Vingtaine
"Balance"	2022	—	—	—	La Vingtaine
"Mamma mia"	2023	40	40	6	La Vingtaine
"Desolée"	2025	—	—	—	Enfants difficiles
"La vie qu'on mène"	2025	—	—	27	Non-album single
"Les enfants difficiles"	2026	—	—	14	Enfants difficiles
"Fais gaffe à toi"	2026	—	—	11	Enfants difficiles
