= Renée Rienties =

Dutch comics artist and illustrator

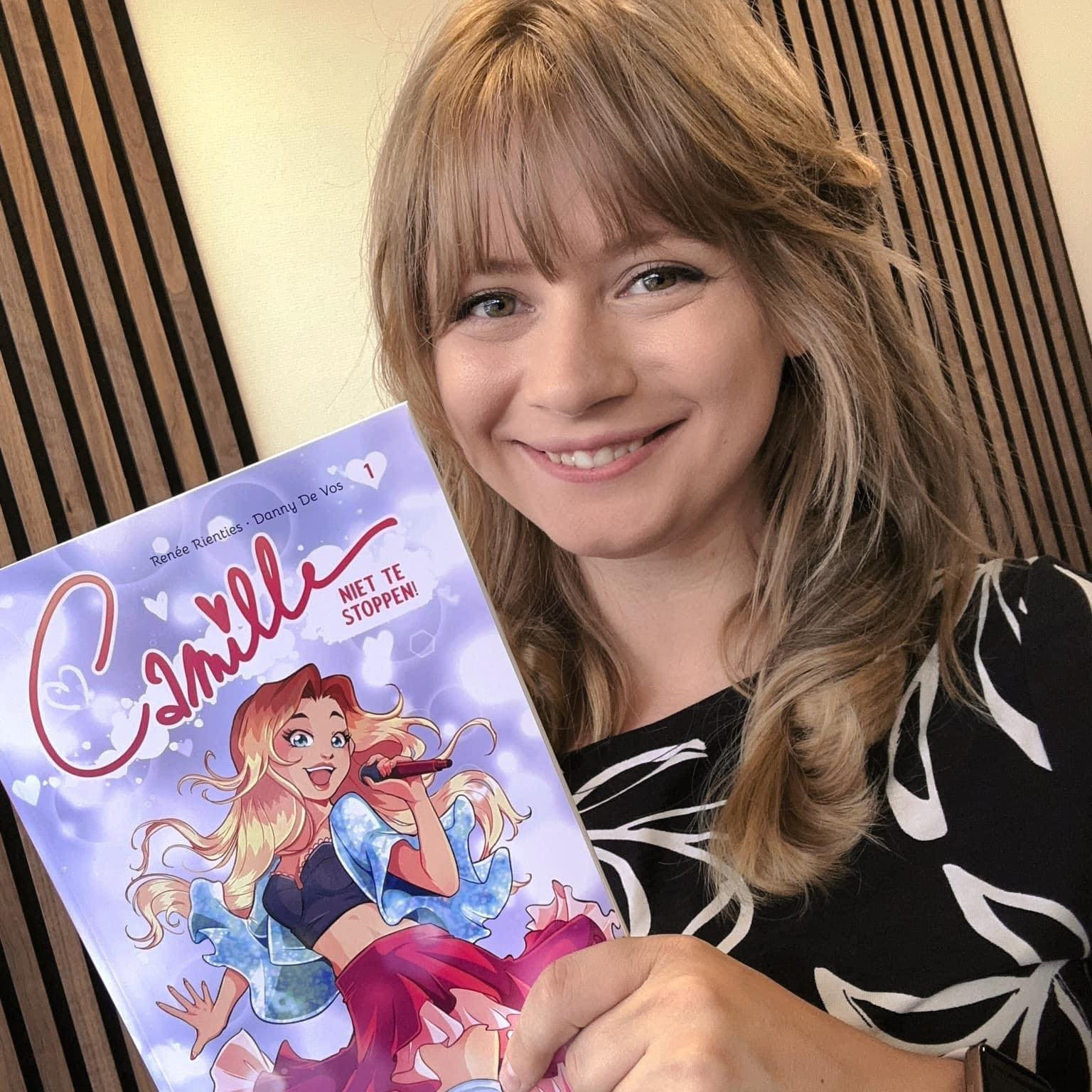
- Renée Rienties (2023)
- Born: Renée Rienties; 1993 (age 32–33) Netherlands
- Areas: Cartoonist, Writer, Penciller, Artist, Inker, Colourist

Renée Rienties (born 1993) is a Dutch cartoonist and illustrator.

== Career ==
Renée Rienties graduated from the colleague Cibap in Zwolle, the Netherlands in 2015, majoring in Multimedia, but she preferred a career as an independent cartoonist and illustrator. In her youth, she was a big fan of Japanese manga comics and later American comics. As a self-taught artist, she learnt those drawing styles from an early age on. Professionally she works with a digital drawing tablet.

In 2016 she made her professional debut with the gag strip My Daily Life Comics. In 2017 the comic Oyasumi was released, a collection of three horror stories drawn by three Dutch mangaka, including Rienties with her story Distortia. In 2018, she drew a short story for the Hollandsch Manga Anthology series. Her story was a mixture of mystery, thriller and horror.

Since 2020, Rienties has been an illustrator for the children's book series Snelle Sam (Eng: Fast Sam), whose authors include Dutch Formula One television presenter Olav Mol. In 2022 she initiated the comic-anthology series Figments of Passion, which was financed by crowdfunding. The series brings together eleven short stories by comic artists from all around the world. That same year she was commissioned as a cartoonist for a children's comic series around Flemish pop star Camille. The first volume called Camille - Niet te stoppen! (Eng: Camille - Unstoppable!) was published in August 2023.

Besides being a cartoonist, Rienties works as an illustrator on commercials and promotional work for companies like the Formula 1 television programme of the Dutch channel Ziggo Sport in 2019. In her typical manga drawing style, she created the illustrations for a promotional film for the seventeenth Grand Prix at the Suzuka circuit in Japan.

She also works as a manga coordinator and curator for The Big Draw Nijmegen, which is part of an international art and education programme in the Netherlands, Japan and South Korea. In 2022, she was one of six illustrators in The Big Draw's Ripple project. They were locked up in the "Besiendershuis" historical building in Nijmegen for 24 hours with the task of creating a short story that warned for the dangers of fast fashion or that made people conscious of throwing away less plastic in nature.

== Bibliography ==
- My Daily Life Comics, gag strip (2016)
- Oyasumi: Distortia (2017)
- Hollandsch Manga, a short story (2018)
- Stripkookboek: 50 recepten (Eng: Comics cookbook: 50 recipes): One of the 50 illustrators (2019)
- Figments of Passion, a short story (2022)
- Ripple, a short story (2022)

=== Series ===
- Snelle Sam (Eng: Fast Sam) (2020–present)
- Sisterhood, short stories in part 1 & 2 (2021-2022)
- Camille (2023–present)
