= MaMaSé! =

Studio album by K3
- Released: 20 November 2009
- Recorded: 2009
- Genre: Pop
- Length: 84:06
- Label: Studio 100
- Producer: Miguel Wiels; Peter Gillis

K3 chronology
| Kusjes (2007) | MaMaSé! (2009) | Eyo! (2011) |

Singles from MaMaSé!
- 1. "De Revolutie!" Released: 9 June 2008; 2. "MaMaSé!" Released: 19 October 2009; 3. "De politie" Released: 12 December 2009

MaMaSé! is the tenth studio album by the Belgian-Dutch girlgroup K3. The album is the first K3 album released featuring the new line-up: with Josje Huisman, who was found via a television contest called K2 zoekt K3, instead of Kathleen Aerts, who had left the group in March 2009. It was released on 20 November 2009 through label Studio 100.

The album contains two CDs. The first CD contains brand new original songs, and the second one contains a selection of K3's biggest hits, but now remixed and featuring new member Josje's voice. Three singles were released to promote the album: "De Revolutie!", "MaMaSé!" and "De politie". MaMaSé! became a big hit and reached the peak position in both the Dutch and Flemish album charts.

== Track listing ==
MaMaSé! – Standard edition disc 1
| No. | Title | Writer(s) | Length |
|---|---|---|---|
| 1. | "MaMaSé!" | Miguel Wiels; Peter Gillis; Alain Vande Putte | 3:20 |
| 2. | "De politie" | Wiels; Gillis; Vande Putte | 3:15 |
| 3. | "Handjes draaien" | Wiels; Gillis; Vande Putte | 3:46 |
| 4. | "Leukste van het land" | Wiels; Gillis; Vande Putte | 3:47 |
| 5. | "Lollypopland" | Wiels; Gillis; Vande Putte | 3:48 |
| 6. | "De Revolutie!" | Wiels; Gillis; Vande Putte | 3:22 |
| 7. | "Hiep hiep hoera" | Wiels; Gillis; Vande Putte | 3:38 |
| 8. | "Radio" | Wiels; Gillis; Vande Putte | 3:22 |
| 9. | "Blankenberge" | Wiels; Gillis; Vande Putte | 3:44 |
| 10. | "Hey hey" | Wiels; Gillis; Vande Putte | 3:38 |
| 11. | "Ster" | Wiels; Gillis; Vande Putte | 3:12 |
| 12. | "Wanneer zie ik jou terug" | Wiels; Gillis; Vande Putte | 3:21 |
| Total length: | | | 42:16 |

MaMaSé! – Standard edition disc 2
| No. | Title | Writer(s) | Length |
|---|---|---|---|
| 1. | "Alle kleuren" | Wiels; Gillis; Vande Putte | 3:37 |
| 2. | "Tele-Romeo" | Wiels; Gillis; Vande Putte | 3:17 |
| 3. | "Heyah mama" | Wiels; Gillis; Vande Putte | 3:22 |
| 4. | "Kuma hé" | Wiels; Gillis; Vande Putte | 3:28 |
| 5. | "Ya ya yippee" | Wiels; Gillis; Vande Putte | 3:35 |
| 6. | "Oya lélé" | Wiels; Gillis; Vande Putte | 3:44 |
| 7. | "Toveren" | Danny Verbiest; Gert Verhulst; Hans Bourlon; Johan Vanden Eede; Wiels; Gillis | 3:15 |
| 8. | "Je hebt een vriend" | Wiels; Gillis; Vande Putte | 3:24 |
| 9. | "Oma's aan de top" | Wiels; Gillis; Vande Putte | 3:22 |
| 10. | "Verliefd" | Wiels; Gillis; Vande Putte | 3:35 |
| 11. | "De 3 biggetjes" | Verbiest; Verhulst; Bourlon; Vanden Eede; Wiels; Gillis | 3:23 |
| 12. | "Kusjesdag" | Wiels; Gillis; Vande Putte | 3:46 |
| Total length: | | | 41:48 |

== Personnel ==
Credits for MaMaSé! adapted from fan site.

K3:

- Karen Damen – main vocals
- Josje Huisman – main vocals
- Kristel Verbeke – main vocals
- Children's choir led by Kristof Aerts – vocals (background)
- Bella Beli – styling
- Hans Bourlon – text
- Alexia Ceulemans – choreography
- Peter Gillis – text, music, production, drums, programming
- Pietro Lacirignola – saxophone
- Kurt Lelièvre – percussion
- Dieter Limbourg – saxophone
- Carlo Mertens – trombone
- Patrick Mortier – trumpet
- Vincent Pierins – bass
- Serge Plume – trumpet
- Monique Stam – styling
- Patrick Steenaerts – guitars
- Children's choir Studio 100 Kids – vocals (background)
- Uwe Teichtert – mastering
- Pallieter Van Buggenhout – guitars
- Wim Van de Genachte – photography
- Jody Van Geert – styling
- Alain Vande Putte – text, music
- Johan Vanden Eede – music
- Danny Verbiest – text
- Ronny Verbiest – accordion
- Gert Verhulst – text
- Geert Waegeman – violin
- Alexia Waku – vocals (background)
- Winke Walschap – make-up
- Miguel Wiels – text, music, production, keyboards

== Chart performance ==
=== Weekly charts ===
| Chart (2009) | Peak position |
|---|---|
| Belgian Albums (Ultratop Flanders) | 1 |
| Dutch Albums (Album Top 100) | 1 |

=== Year-end charts ===
| Chart (2009) | Position |
|---|---|
| Belgian Albums Chart (Flanders) | 2 |
| Dutch Albums Chart | 7 |
| Chart (2010) | Position |
| Belgian Albums Chart (Flanders) | 1 |
| Dutch Albums Chart | 4 |
| Chart (2011) | Position |
| Belgian Albums Chart (Flanders) | 52 |
| Dutch Albums Chart | 46 |

== Certifications ==
| Region | Certification | Certified units/sales |
|---|---|---|
| Belgium (BRMA) | 4× Platinum | 80,000^{*} |
| Netherlands (NVPI) | Platinum | 50,000^{^} |
^{*} Sales figures based on certification alone.^{^} Shipments figures based on certification alone.
