= Lift You Up =

- Genre: Reality competition
- Presented by: Koen Wauters; Eva De Roo
- Judges: Metejoor; Jasper Steverlinck; Laura Tesoro; Bart Peeters
- Country of origin: Belgium
- Original language: Dutch
- No. of series: 1
- No. of episodes: 9

Production
- Producer: DPG Media
- Running time: 100 minutes

Original release
- Network: vtm
- Release: January 24 – March 14, 2025

Lift You Up is a Belgian reality talent show for the Flemish region of Belgium. It premiered on 24 January 2025 on VTM. The show only aired one season.

The show consists of three stages: understage, collabs and finals. The winner of the first original season was Anna Winkin.

The artists for the first season were Bart Peeters, Jasper Steverlinck, Laura Tesoro and Metejoor.

== Format ==
The format consists of three phases: Understage, Collabs, and Finals. Contestants perform on a mechanized stage lift that physically rises based on audience voting.

=== Understage ===
Before auditing, contestants select their preferred artists. Only the selected artists can participate in that contestant's audition.

The audition begins with the contestant performing on a platform hidden beneath the main stage. The studio audience is split into four "fanzones," each representing a artist. Audience members vote electronically during the performance. If a contestant receives enough votes, the lift rises to the main stage. The contestant is then assigned to the team of the artist whose fanzone gave them the highest percentage of votes.

Each artist can use one "Supermatch" per season. This overrides the audience vote, automatically awards 100 points, raises the lift to the top, and forces the contestant onto that artist's team.

=== Collabs ===
In the "Collabs" round, artists join their contestants on stage to perform duets. These performances test the musical chemistry between the artist and the contestant. The fanzones vote on the collaborations, and the contestants with the lowest scores are eliminated to narrow down the teams.

=== Finals ===
In the finals, the remaining contestants debut an original single alongside their artist. The winner is determined by a final audience vote. The winning contestant receives a €15,000 cash prize, the official release of their collaborative single, and a spot as the opening act on their artist's upcoming tour.

== Artists and presenters ==
| Presenters | Koen Wauters: 2025; Eva De Roo: 2025 |
| Artists | Jasper Steverlinck: 2025; Bart Peeters: 2025; Laura Tesoro: 2025; Metejoor: 2025 |

=== Artists ===
In May 2024, the artists were announced to be The Voice van Vlaanderen original coach, Jasper Steverlinck, previous Belgium's Got Talent judge, Bart Peeters, and The Voice Kids coaches, Laura Tesoro, and Metejoor.

=== Presenters ===
In August 2024, the presenters were announced. Longest serving coach of The Voice van Vlaanderen, Koen Wauters was the presenter of this season, he was joined by Studio Brussel radio presenter, Eva De Roo.

== Artists and matches ==
Color key
Winner
Runner-up
Third place
Fourth place

- Warning: the following table presents a significant amount of different colors.
- Winners are in bold, the finalists in the finale are in italicized font, and the eliminated artists are in small font.

| Season | Matches | | | |
| 1 | Metejoor | Jasper Steverlinck | Laura Tesoro | Bart Peeters |
|---|---|---|---|---|
| 1 | Katrien | Madeline | **Anna Winkin** | Daan |

== Series overview ==
Lift You Up series overview
| Season | No. of episodes | Originally aired | | Winner | Runner-up | Third place | Fourth place | Winning artist |
| Season | No. of episodes | First episode | Last episode | Winner | Runner-up | Third place | Fourth place | Winning artist |
|---|---|---|---|---|---|---|---|---|
| 1 | 9 | January 24, 2025 | March 14, 2025 | Laura Tesoro & Anna Winkin | Bart Peeters & Daan | Metejoor & Katrien | Jasper Steverlinck & Madeline | Laura Tesoro |

== Season summary ==
=== Season 1 (2025) ===
The first season of Lift You Up aired from 24 January to 14 March 2025. Koen Wauters presented the season, as well as Eva De Roo. The artists for this season were Laura Tesoro, Metejoor, Bart Peeters and Jasper Steverlinck. The winner of this season was Anna Winkin, matched with Tesoro.
