= Jade De Rijcke =

Belgian singer (born 2003)

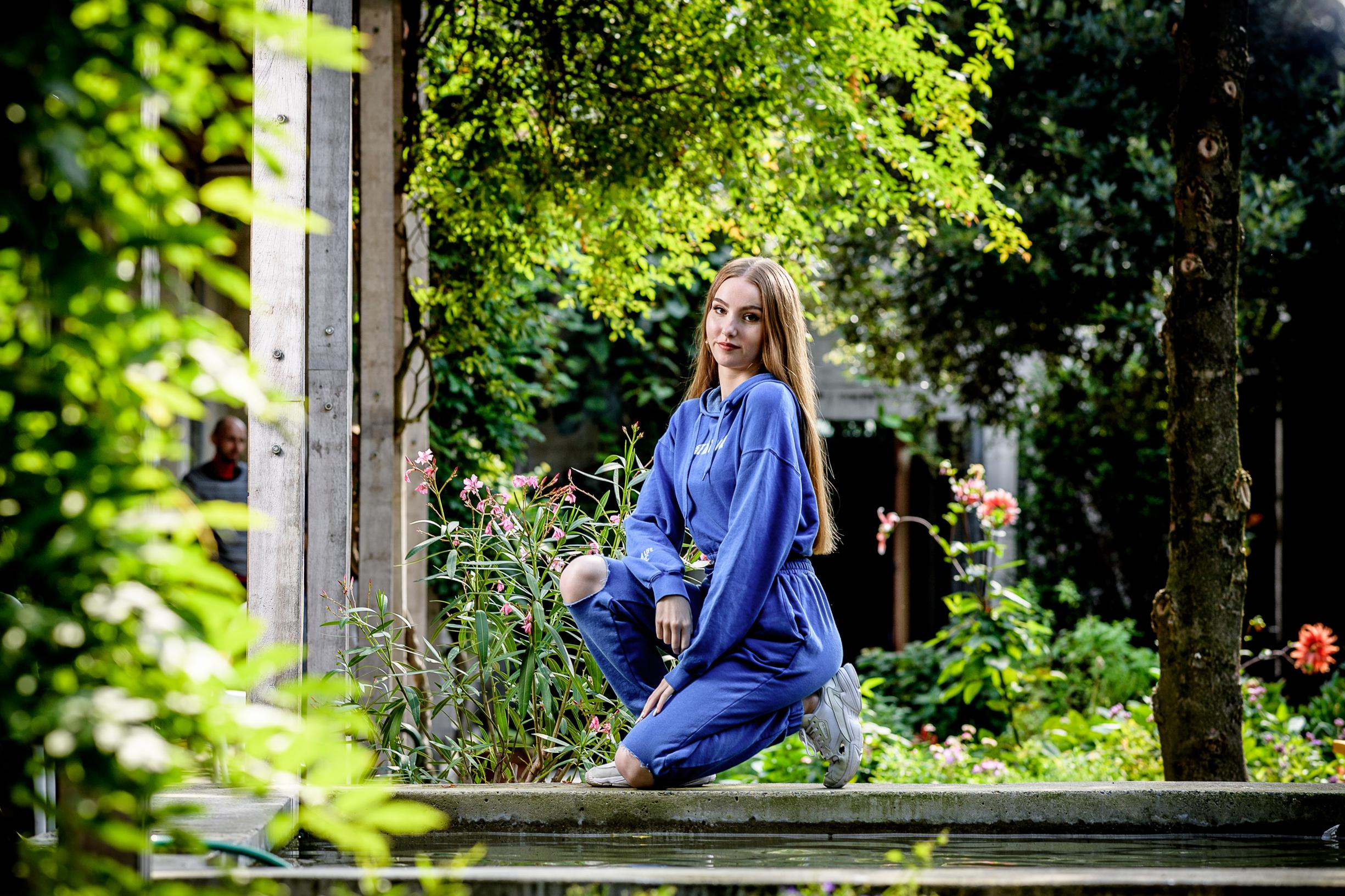
- De Rijcke in 2022

Background information
- Also known as: Jade
- Born: Jade De Rijcke; 2 December 2003 (age 22); Belgium
- Genres: Pop
- Occupation: Singer
- Instruments: Vocals
- Years active: 2018-present

Jade De Rijcke (2 December 2003), known mononymously as Jade, is a Belgian singer. When she was 14 years old, De Rijcke won season 4 of Belgium's The Voice Kids.

== Life and career ==
Jade De Rijcke is from Oostakker, Belgium. In 2016, she performed at the Ghent Festival at Sint-Baafsplein. She has also performed at the Bruudruuster Rock festival in her hometown.

De Rijcke auditioned for Belgium's The Voice Kids in 2017 with "Don't Let Me Down" by The Chainsmokers but did not progress past the blind auditions. She auditioned again in September 2018 with "Homesick" by Dua Lipa, persuading all four judges to turn their chairs within a few seconds. She decided to join Team Gers.

De Rijcke sang "Better Now" by Post Malone for the battle round and "Sober" by Demi Lovato for the semifinals. In the finals, she performed "Perfect" by Pink and "Grand Piano" by Nicki Minaj. She won the show, taking home 10,000 euros and a record contract for her first single.

Shortly after her win, De Rijcke performed at the Rode Neuzen XL in Sportpaleis. She signed a contract with Universal and released her first single, "Straw House", in March 2019. Within a year, the song had 1.5 million streams on Spotify. This was followed by a second single, "Your Type", which was released in September 2019. She released "Lately" on 23 September 2020 and "When I Cry" on 28 January 2022. She performed "Lately" on the season 5 finale of Belgium's The Voice Kids.

On 6 May 2022, it was announced that De Rijcke would represent Belgium at Europops Song Contest 2022. Her song "Pages" was released on 7 September 2022. The Grand Final was held on 11 November. De Rijcke won the contest with her song "Pages", getting 553 points.
