= MaMaSé! (song) =

"MaMasé!"

Single by K3

from the album MaMaSe!
- Language: Dutch
- Released: October 2009
- Recorded: 2009
- Genre: Pop
- Length: 3:47
- Label: Studio 100
- Songwriters: Miguel Wiels, A. Putte, P. Gillis
- Producer: Studio 100

K3 singles chronology
"De Revolutie!" (2008)	"MaMasé!" (2009)	"De Politie" (2009)

"MaMaSé!" is the first single to be released from Flemish/Dutch girl group K3' tenth studio album MaMaSé!. It was written by Miguel Wiels, A. Putte, P. Gillis, and produced by Studio 100. The song premiered in October 2009, on the reality television show called K2 Zoekt K3, which was the search for a new third k3 member (Kathleen Aerts had left back in March). It has charted in the Top 40 and the Ultra Top 50, and according to mid-week predictions, was already a massive success in its first week of release. The song later went platinum.

== Music video ==
There are two versions of MaMaSé! one featuring Karen, Kristel, Josje, Noa, and Madelon and a final version that only features K2 featuring the new member Josje. There are scenes where the girls watch the TV show K2 Zoekt K3 finale and scenes where they dance with a rainbow background behind them.

== Charts ==
=== Weekly charts ===
Chart (2009)	Peak position
Belgium (Ultratop 50 Flanders)	1
Netherlands (Dutch Top 40)	2
Netherlands (Single Top 100)	1

=== Year-end charts ===
Chart (2009)	Position
Belgium (Ultratop Flanders)	2
Netherlands (Dutch Top 40)	42
Netherlands (Single Top 100)	3

=== Decade-end charts ===
Chart (2009)	Position
Netherlands (Single Top 100)	88
