= Josje Huisman =

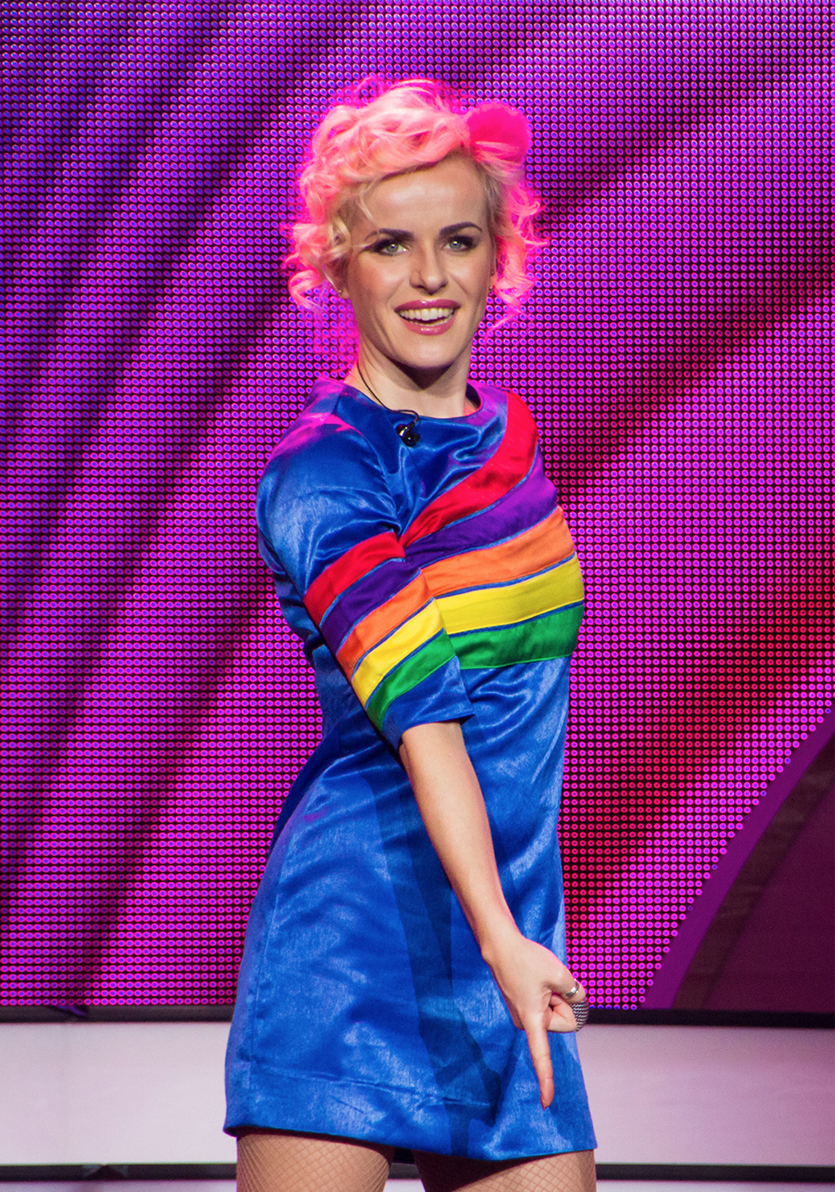

Background information
- Born: Josina Cornelia Huisman; 16 February 1986 (age 40)
- Origin: Heusden, Netherlands
- Genre: Pop
- Occupation: Singer
- Instrument: Vocals
- Years active: 2009–2016
- Labels: Studio 100, Sony BMG
- Website: k3.be

Josina Cornelia "Josje" Huisman (born 16 February 1986) is a Dutch singer best known as the second blonde member of the girl group K3. She was the winner of the televised talent show K2 zoekt K3 in 2009 and was part of the group until 2016.

== Life and career ==
=== Early life ===
Josina Cornelia Huisman was born in Heusden, the Netherlands. She is the daughter of a vicar. She took ballet class as a child at school. In 2008, Huisman completed her studies at the Dansacademie Lucia Marthas in Groningen. She took musical lessons.

=== K3 ===
Huisman entered the television talent contest K2 zoekt K3 where the winner would become the new third member of hit sensation K3, a Belgian group. The contest was broadcast in the Flemish-speaking part of Belgium and in the Netherlands. On 3 October 2009 Huisman won the much publicized talent show. She was the favorite of the viewers, the judges and the other two members of the band K3. By winning the contest, Huisman became a member of K3.

The first single with Huisman, Mamasé became very successful and went platinum. Becoming part of the group, Huisman moved to Antwerp, Belgium. While Huisman was a member of K3, the group released four albums, two movies and two television shows, performed in seven tours and one musical. During her time as a member of the band, Huisman was a favorite subject of the tabloids, often publicizing about her relations with other celebrities, such as Gert Verhulst, Johnny de Mol and Kevin Janssens or her changing looks.

Besides K3, Huisman starred in the Dutch series Fashion Planet (2014) and took part in the reality contest Dansdate (2014) where she became the semi-finalist with her then-boyfriend, Kevin Janssens. She performed in the musical Wickie de Viking (2015–2016).

On 18 March 2015 K3 announced that the current band members would quit the band after finding new members. A new television talent contest, K3 zoekt K3 aired. On 6 November 2015 the three new members of K3 were chosen. Following the show, the old and the new K3 launched a tour together. It was a goodbye tour for Huisman and the other old members and a debuting tour for the new members. At 8 May 2016 Huisman performed for the last time as a member of K3.

=== It-girl ===
On 31 August 2016 Huisman released her first book, Dresscode Josje. On 1 October 2016 she was one of the celebrities entering a boxing contest to promote the new television channel, CAZ. She participated in December 2016, at the celebrity quiz, De Slimste Mens ter Wereld.

A new Beauty and the Beast (musical) premiered on 10 December 2016, at Flanders Expo in Ghent. Huisman performed as Belle.

== Discography ==
Studio albums

- 2009: MaMaSé!
- 2011: Eyo!
- 2012: Engeltjes
- 2013: Loko le

== Filmography ==
Television
Year	Title	Role	Notes
2009	K2 Zoekt K3	Herself	Winner, search for the new K3 member
2009	De Wereld van K3	Host	Talkshow, 2009–2013
2010–2013	Hallo K3!	Josje, main role	Sitcom, screen-acting debut
2012	K3 Bengeltjes	Josje, main role	Feature film, spin-off of the sitcom, movie-debut
2014	K3 Dierenhotel	Josje, main role	Feature film, spin-off of the sitcom
2014–2015	K3 Kan Het!	Josje, main role	Reality show, where K3 makes wishes of children come true
