= Camille Dhont =

Belgian singer and actress

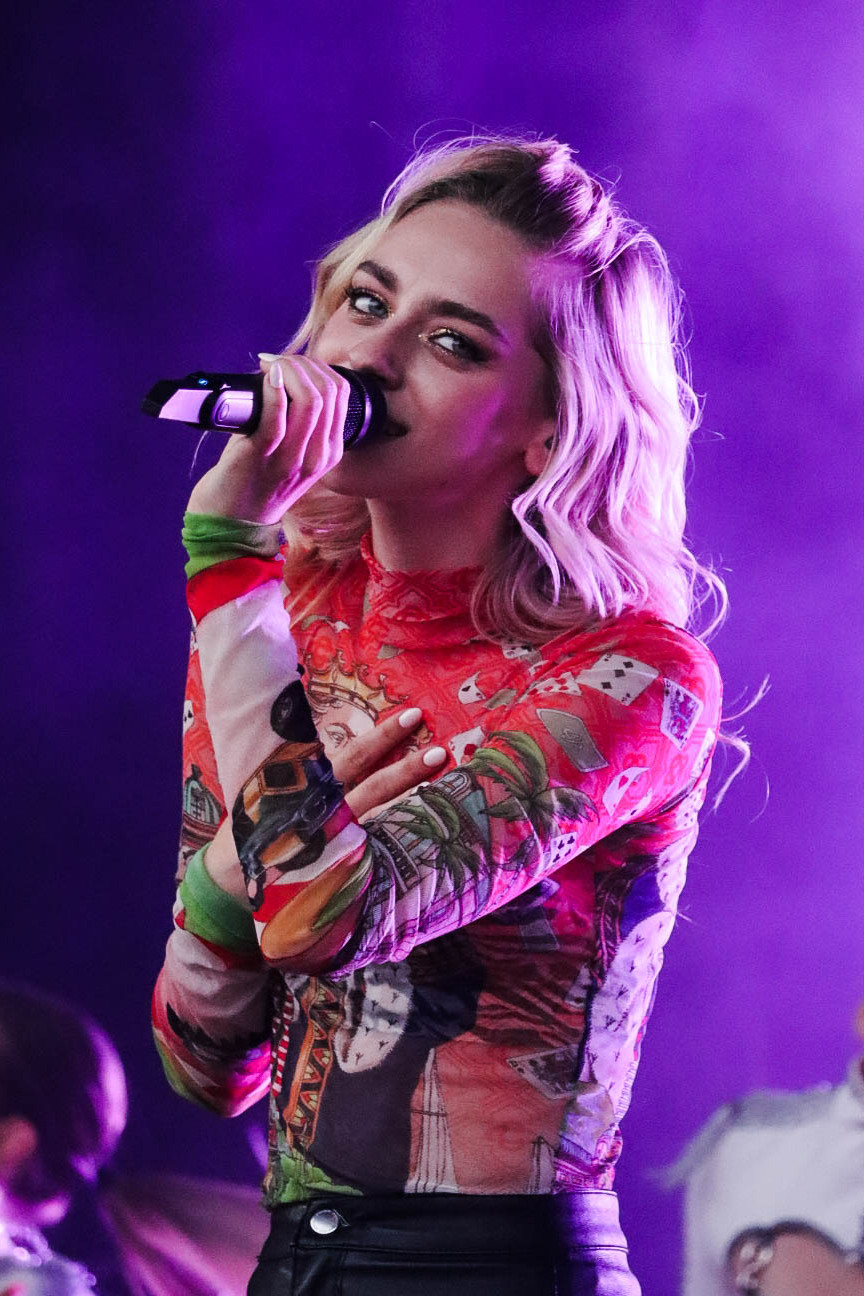
- Dhont in 2021
- Born: 12 June 2001 (age 25); Wevelgem, Belgium
- Occupations: Singer, actress
- Years active: 2017–present

Camille Dhont, also known as Camille (born 12 June 2001) is a Belgian singer and actress.

== Biography ==
Born in Wevelgem, Dhont made her professional debut in 2017, in the stage musical De ridders van de ronde keukentafel. She had her breakout thanks to a leading role in the Ketnet series #LikeMe. In 2021 she made her recording debut with the album Vuurwerk using the mononym Camille. In 2022 she released her album SOS and held a tour with over 100 dates, including five sold-out concerts at the Lotto Arena in Antwerp. The same year, she was protagonist of a 9 episodes reality mini series, Camille, Welkom In Mijn Leven ("Camille, Welcome In My Life") and of the two-parts television documentary ‘Ik Ben Camille ("I am Camille"), both broadcast on VTM. In 2023 she won the Music Industry Awards for Best Dutch Language Song and Best Pop Song.

Dhont was the winner of the second season of the Flemish version of The Masked Singer. She also served as an ambassador in the Week Against Bullying.

She has her own comic book created by the Dutch comic artist Renée Rienties and the Belgian writer Danny De Vos. The first volume called Camille - Niet te stoppen! (Eng: Camille - Unstoppable!) was published in August 2023.

== Discography ==
Studio albums

- Vuurwerk (2021)
- SOS (2022)
- Magie (2023)
- Circus (2025)
- Negen levens (2026)
