= Metejoor =

Belgian singer

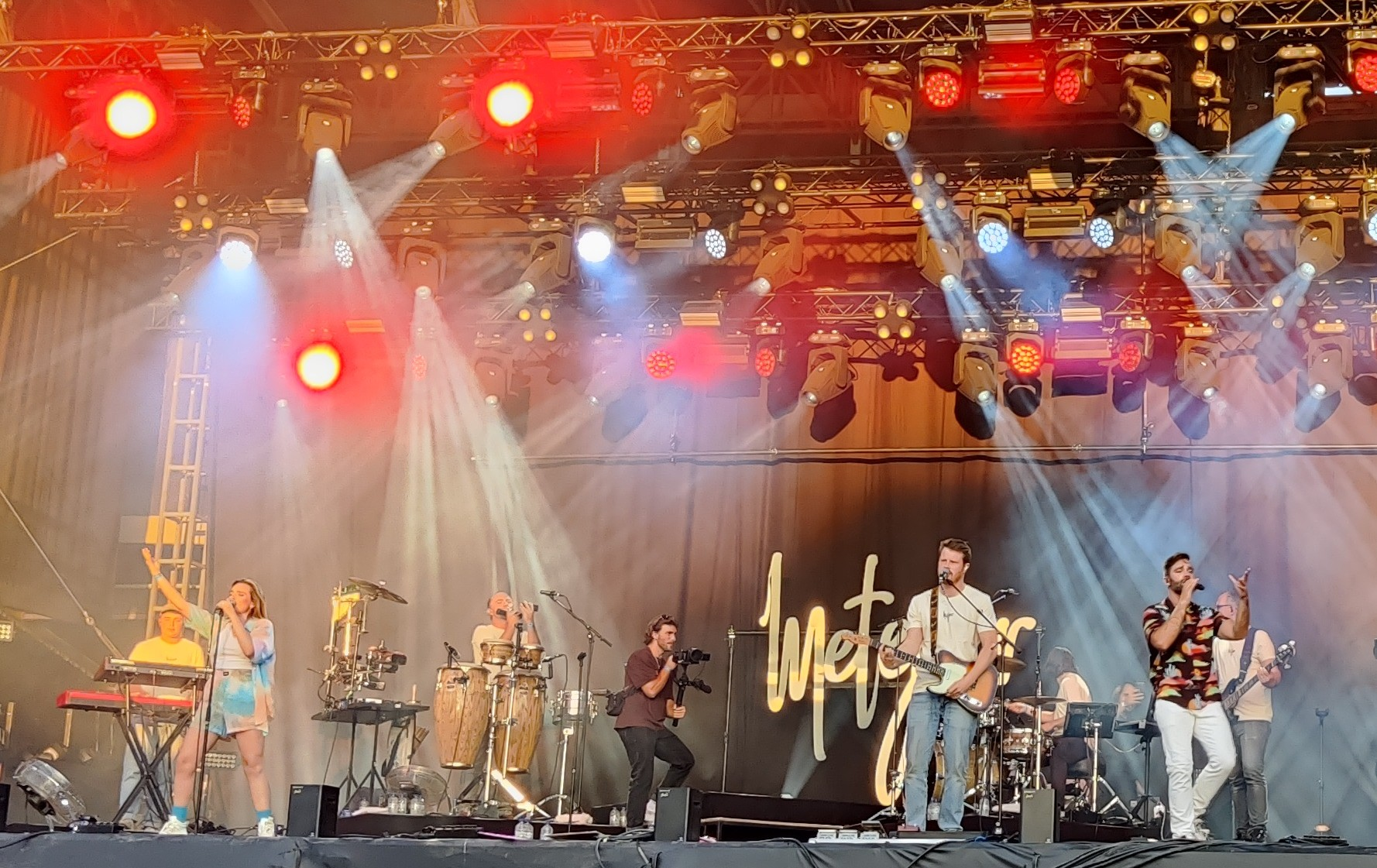
Metejoor (front right) at Maanrock Mechelen, 2022

Joris Van Rossem (born 4 January 1991), known artistically as Metejoor, is a Belgian pop singer who sings in Dutch. He topped the Ultratop charts in Flanders with the singles "1 op een miljoen" and "Dit is wat mijn mama zei", from his self-titled debut album that topped the respective album chart.

== Music career ==
Born in Duffel, Metejoor wanted to be a gymnastics instructor before pursuing music. After his sister sent an audition tape to The Voice van Vlaanderen in 2016, he met the producer Hans Francken and began releasing music. He suffered from extreme stage fright in his early career. In 2018, he opened for the Belgian group Clouseau on their tour of the Netherlands, and for Niels Destadsbader at Antwerp's Sportpaleis.

Metejoor topped the Ultratop 50 Singles chart for Flanders in two non-consecutive weeks of April 2021 with the single "1 op een miljoen", a duet with Dutch singer Babet. The song also peaked at number 29 in the Dutch Top 40. The song "Dit is wat mijn mama zei" also topped the Flemish charts for three separate weeks in March and April 2022. His eponymous debut album went straight to number one in Flanders on 6 November 2021, and topped the chart for three weeks early in the following year.

== Television work ==
Metejoor took part on the Flemish version of Dancing with the Stars in late 2021 but withdrew through injury. He also took part in the second season of the reality show Een echte job on VTM, in which celebrities learned how to work in a hospital in Hasselt.

In 2022, Metejoor became a judge for the sixth season of The Voice Kids in Flanders.

Metejoor appeared as guest artist in I Can See Your Voice (2022) and appeared as mentor in Lift You Up (2025)

He appeared as himself in a scene with the character Christine Leysen (Daphne Paelinck) in episode 5391 of the VRT 1 Soap opera Thuis (2023) as part of a week in which Flemish celebrities make cameo appearances. He also played a version of himself in season 2 of the VTM-telenovelle Milo (2024).

In 2025, he became one of the artists for the talent show, Lift You Up, where he placed third with his match, Katrien.

== Discography ==
List of studio albums, with selected details and peak chart positions
Title	Details	Peak chart positions	Certifications
Title	Details	BEL (FL)	Certifications
Metejoor	Released: 29 October 2021; Label: Fruity, Mostiko; Format: CD, digital download, streaming	1	BEA: Platinum
Joris	Released: 29 September 2023; Label: Fruity, Mostiko; Format: CD, digital download, streaming	1	
3	Released: 31 October 2025; Label: Fruity, CNR; Format: CD, digital download, streaming	1	
