= De 3 Biggetjes (musical) =

De 3 Biggetjes (English: The Three Pigs or Three Little Pigs)
- 2003 album cover
- Music: Johan Vanden Eede; Miguel Wiels
- Lyrics: Gert Verhulst; Danny Verbiest; Hans Bourlon; Tijl Dauwe
- Basis: The Three Little Pigs
- Productions: 2003 Belgium: Antwerp; 2007 Belgium: Antwerp and Hasselt; 2007 Netherlands: Rotterdam; 2024 Belgium Tour; 2024 Netherlands Tour
- Awards: Musical Awards 2024: Audience Award Best Family Musical

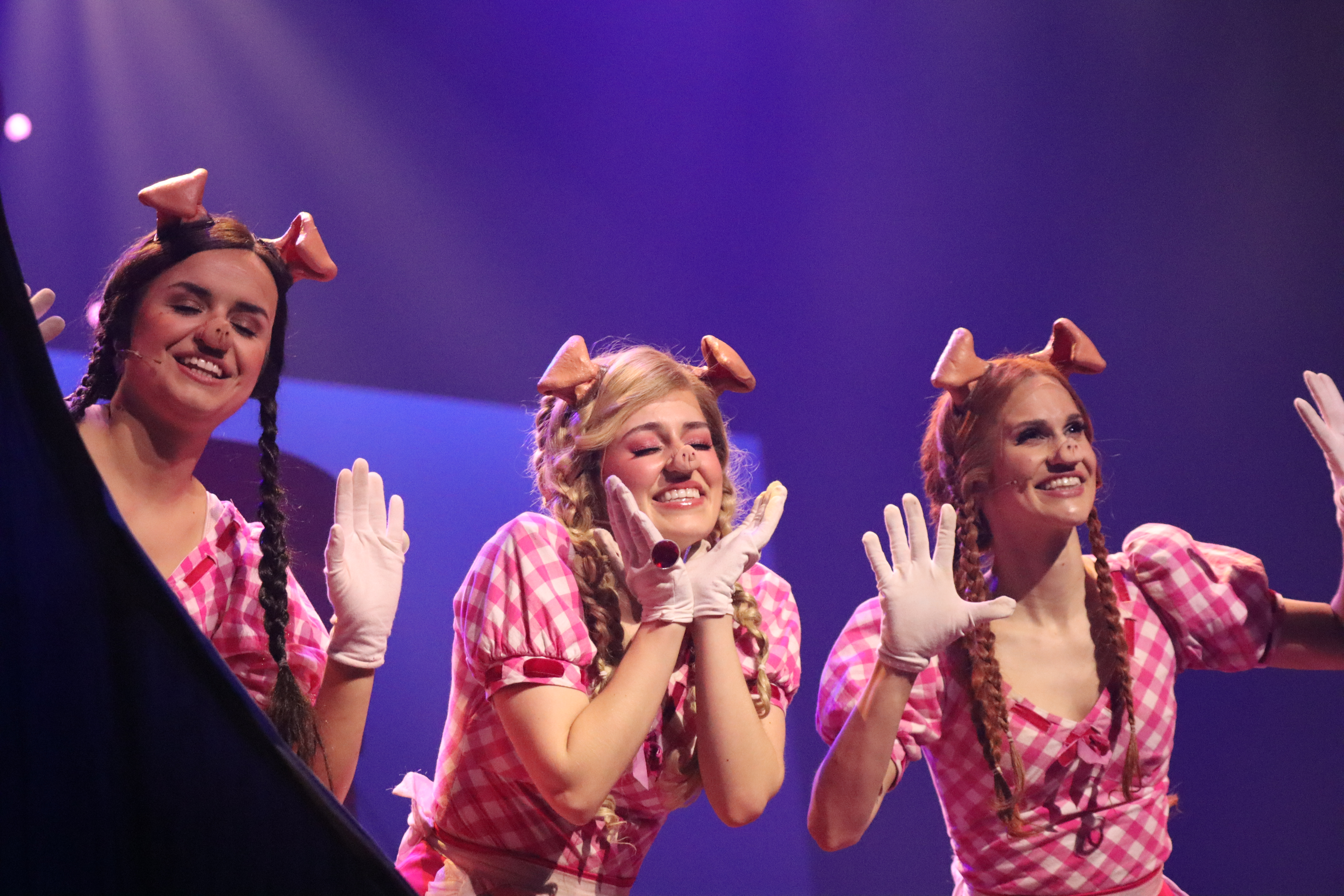
De 3 Biggetjes Musical 2024

The Three Little Pigs (Dutch: De 3 Biggetjes) is a Flemish-Dutch musical, based on the fairy tale of the same name and serves as a sequel to it. The leading roles are played by the pop group K3. The musical tells the story of the three daughters of the pig with the brick house: Knirri, Knarri, and Knorri, who work as waitresses in their mother's Three Little Pigs Café. Meanwhile, the big bad wolf now has three sons, who are the same age as the three pig sisters. The wolf wants his sons to catch the three pig sisters as part of a personal vendetta, but the pigs and wolves fall in love with each other instead.

== Casts ==
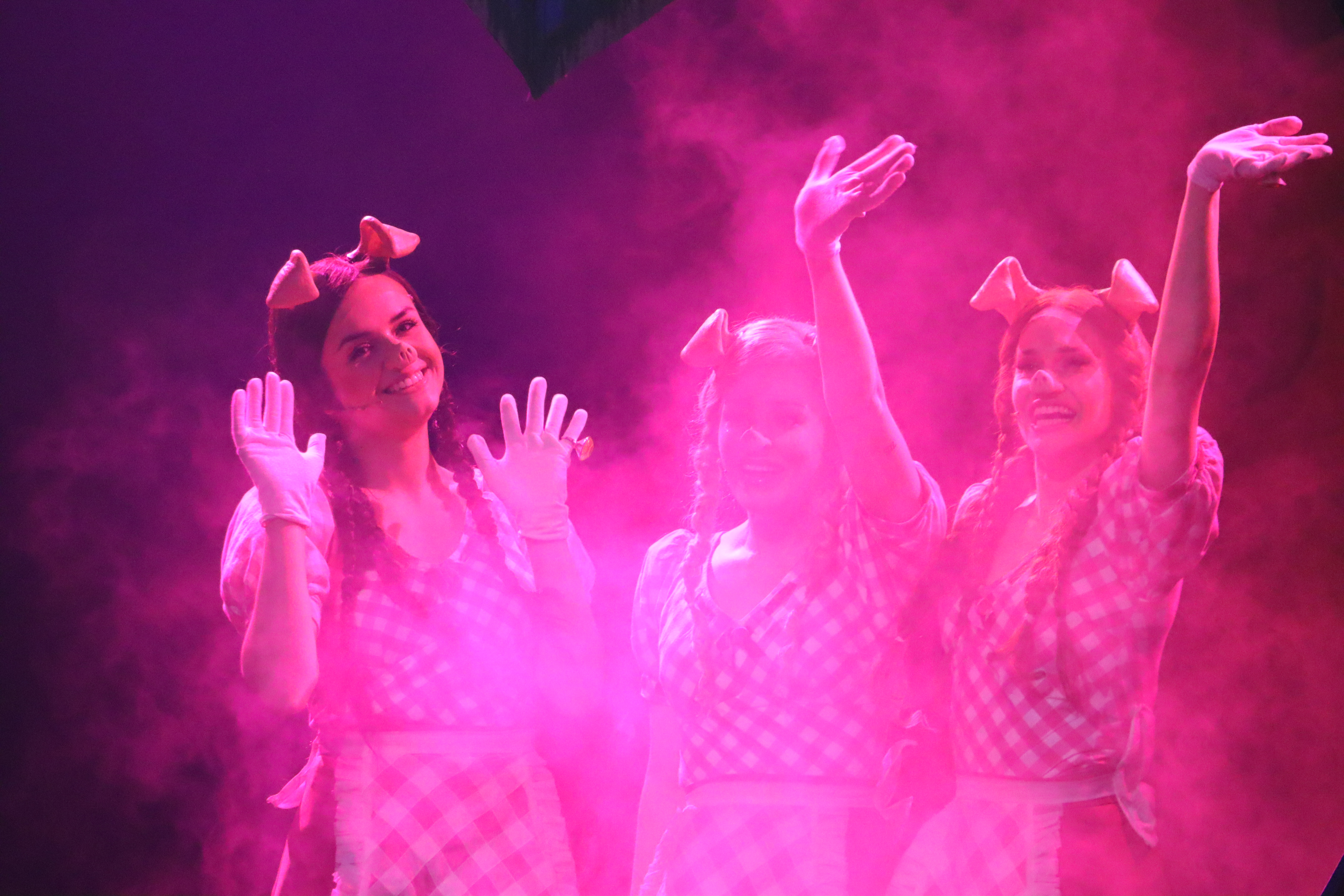
Marthe De Pillecyn, Julia Boschman and Hanne Verbruggen

The principal original casts of the major productions of De 3 Biggetjes.

Character	Cast 2003	Understudy 2003	Cast 2007	Understudy 2007	Cast 2024	Understudy 2024
Knirri	Kristel Verbeke	Hilde Weber	Kristel Verbeke	Deborah De Ridder	Marthe De Pillecyn	Charlotte Champion
Knarri	Karen Damen	Ann Vanderstighelen	Karen Damen	Deborah De Ridder	Hanne Verbruggen	Engel Talarima
Knorri	Kathleen Aerts	Marscha de Haan	Kathleen Aerts	Deborah De Ridder	Julia Boschman	Oonagh Jacobs
Willy	Jan Schepens	Frank van Erum	David Michiels	Ferry de Graaf	Michiel De Meyer	Matthew Michel
Waldo	Dimitri Verhoeven	Sebastien de Smet	Patrick Onzia	Martijn Egelmeer	Giovanni Kemper	Bas van Rijswijk
Wuppert	Peter Thyssen	Stefan Hamblok	Peter Thyssen	Frank van Erum	Louis Thyssen	Chris Schep
Baltimore	Dirk Lavrysen	Michael Zanders	Dirk Lavrysen	Michael Zanders	Peter Thyssen	Brent Pannier
Louie the Fox	Door Van Boeckel	Michael Zanders	Door Van Boeckel	Michael Zanders	Walter Baele	Brent Pannier
Mama Ganda	Daisy Thys	Rhiannon Hansen	Daisy Thys	Petra Hanskens	Nurlaila Karim	Maja van Honsté
Bunny	Free Souffriau	Hilde Weber	Free Souffriau	Tine Brouwers	Marie Verhulst	Charlotte Champion

== Recording chart positions ==
Chart	2003 peak position	2024 peak position
Belgian Albums (Ultratop Flanders)	2	1
Dutch Albums (Album Top 100)	16	6
