= Belgian Recorded Music Association =

Music industry organisation in Belgium

- Abbreviation: BRMA
- Predecessor: Belgian Entertainment Association (BEA)
- Formation: February 1, 2008; 18 years ago
- Type: Nonprofit organisation
- VAT ID no.: BE0406594306
- Headquarters: UCLouvain Brussels Woluwe
- Location: Brussels, Belgium
- Region served: Belgium
- Website: brma.be

The Belgian Recorded Music Association (BRMA), previously Belgian Entertainment Association (BEA) is the organisation that represents the interests of the music industry in Belgium. The BRMA is the local record industry association in Belgium of the International Federation of the Phonographic Industry (IFPI).

== History ==
Logo of the Belgian Entertainment Association

Its predecessor, the Belgian Entertainment Association (BEA), was founded in February 2008, as a merger of three organisations: IFPI Belgium, the local chapter of the International Federation of the Phonographic Industry (IFPI), which represented the music industry, the Belgian Video Federation, which represented the video industry, and the Belgian Luxembourg Interactive Software Association, which represented the video game industry. In 2022, the organisation changed its name from the BEA to the BRMA.

== Sales charts ==
The publication of sales charts in Belgium is done through Ultratop, a non-profit organisation created by the BRMA. Due to the cultural differences in Belgium, separate charts are published for the Dutch-speaking Flanders region and the French-speaking Wallonia region. In Flanders the most important charts are the Ultratop 50 singles and the Ultratop 50 albums. In Wallonia the most important charts are the Ultratop 40 singles.

== Certifications ==
Through Ultratop, the BRMA certifies albums, singles and DVDs. Since 2016 for singles, and since July 2017 for albums, the Ultratop charts also include streaming, and this practice is also in effect for certifications. The exact number of streams that are counted as a single or an album is undisclosed. In order to avoid inflation of album sales through raising the number of tracks, only the twelve most streamed tracks are counted. To avoid the effect of one-hit wonders, the two most streamed tracks are counted at the average of the next ten tracks.

=== Albums ===
The current thresholds for albums, in effect since the inclusion of streams in July 2017, are 10,000 units for Gold album and 20,000 for Platinum. Prior to that, the thresholds distinguished between local, French or Dutch speaking albums ("domestic"), and international or non French or Dutch speaking ones ("international"). Since May 2007, the thresholds for domestic albums were 10,000 units for Gold and 20,000 for Platinum, the same as they are currently, while the international repertoire the threshold for Gold was 15,000 units and the threshold for Platinum was 30,000. Previous to that, the thresholds were 15,000/30,000 for domestic repertoire and 25,000/50,000 for international repertoire. Jazz and Classical repertoire shares the thresholds with the domestic repertoire.

=== Singles ===
The current thresholds for domestic singles are 10,000 units for Gold and 20,000 for Platinum, while the levels for international singles are 20,000/40,000, respectively. The international levels were set in July 2018, following the sudden increase in single awards due to the inclusion of streaming. Prior to that, the levels for international singles were the same as the ones for domestic ones, i.e., 10,000 units for Gold and 20,000 for Platinum. The newer levels are applied retroactively, as long as the single was not previously certified.

The thresholds prior to the inclusion of streaming followed the thresholds for albums, i.e., 10,000/20,000 for domestic singles and 15,000/30,000 for international. Based on the IFPI 2009 report, these levels were in effect from mid-2009, however, the change from the older levels, 15,000/30,000 for domestic repertoire and 25,000/50,000 for international repertoire, succeeded the levels change of albums in May 2007, as these levels are still listed by the October 2007 IFPI report.

=== DVDs ===
The thresholds for DVDs distinguish between Belgian products sold in one locality, Belgian products sold nationwide, and foreign products. For Belgian-local products, the thresholds are 7,500 units for Gold, 15,500 units for Platinum and 25,500 units for Diamond. For Belgian-nationwide products, the thresholds are 15,000 units for Gold, 30,000 units for Platinum and 50,000 units for Diamond. For foreign products, the thresholds are 25,000 units for Gold, 50,000 units for Platinum and 100,000 units for Diamond.

=== Archive ===
An archive of past certifications going back to 1997 is available on the Ultratop website.

== List of multi-platinum certified albums ==
The following is a list of albums that have been certified multi-platinum by the Belgian Entertainment Association.

=== Two times ===
- 19
- A Day Without Rain
- A Rush of Blood to the Head
- Black Ice
- Bretonne
- Des roses & des orties
- Duetten
- Entity
- Eros
- Good Girl Gone Bad
- Hybrid Theory
- Intensive Care
- Les Mots
- Loose
- Metallica
- Notre-Dame de Paris
- On trace la route
- One Love
- Only by the Night
- Parachutes
- Paint the Sky with Stars
- Rockferry
- Romanza
- Shepherd Moons
- Soul
- S'il suffisait d'aimer
- The Best of 1990–2000
- The Broken Circle Breakdown
- The Colour of My Love
- Map of the Soul: Persona
- The Fame
- The Fame Monster
- Michael Jackson's This Is It
- This Is the Life
- Tous les rêves ...
- Unplugged
- X&Y

=== Three times ===
- All the Way... A Decade of Song
- ...Baby One More Time
- Back to Bedlam
- Back to Black
- Buena Vista Social Club
- Cheese
- Greatest Hits
- MaMaSé!
- MTV Unplugged in New York
- Multitude
- Music
- Oops!...I Did It Again
- Quinze ans d'amour - Best Of
- The Best Of
- The E.N.D.
- Viva la Vida or Death and All His Friends
- Zaz

=== Four times ===
- Falling into You
- Hits
- Let's Talk About Love
- Samedi soir sur la terre
- Selah Sue
- Story

=== Five times ===
- Clouseau 20
- Liefde voor publiek
- Life in Cartoon Motion
- Ushuaia
- Spice
- Spiceworld

=== Six times ===
- 21
- The Best of 1980–1990
- D'eux

=== Seven times ===
- Gold: Greatest Hits

=== Eight times ===
- 25
- 10.000 luchtballonnen

=== Twelve times ===
- Racine carrée

== See also ==
- List of music recording certifications
- Music Industry Awards, Flemish music prizes awarded by the VRT in collaboration with Music Centre Flanders
