= K3 en de Kattenprins =

2007 film featuring the Flemish girlband K3

- Theatrical release poster
- Directed by: Matthias Temmermans
- Produced by: Studio 100
- Music by: K3
- Distributed by: Belgium:Kinepolis Film; Netherlands:Independent Films
- Release date: December 2007
- Running time: 73 minutes
- Countries: Belgium; Netherlands
- Language: Dutch

K3 en de Kattenprins (K3 and the Cat Prince) is the third movie of the Flemish girlband K3. The movie was released in 2007 and was directed by Matthias Temmermans. This was also their last movie to include former member of K3, Kathleen Aerts. The film was aired on Zappelin, Ketnet, Kindernet and RTL Telekids.

== Plot ==
K3 has found a book of fairy tales in their bedroom. In this book hey see a prince who had been cursed by the cat-queen. If the prince is not kissed by his true love by midnight, he will change into a cat. To find his true love, he asks the fairy Fiorella for help. Fiorella goes down to the house of K3 and brings them to Fairyland, high in the clouds.

== Cast ==
- Karen Damen as herself
- Kristel Verbeke as herself
- Kathleen Aerts as herself
- Roel Vanderstukken as The Prince
- Terence Schreurs as Fiorella
- Irene Moors as Cook/Aunt Yvette
- Carry Goossens as Lackey Nestor/Uncle André
- Frank van Erum as Lackey Fribulaer
- Geert Dehertefelt as Lackey
- Inni Massez as Lady in waiting
- Kim Nelis as Lady in waiting
- Annelies Smeyers as Lady in waiting
- Wali Oliviers as Gardener
- Anne Mie Gils as Abbesinia
- Britt Van Der Borght as Fillina
- Knarf Van Pellecom as Krats

== Soundtrack ==
- K3 - Prinses (Princess)
- K3 - Ware liefde (True Love)
