= K3 (group) =

Belgian-Dutch girl group

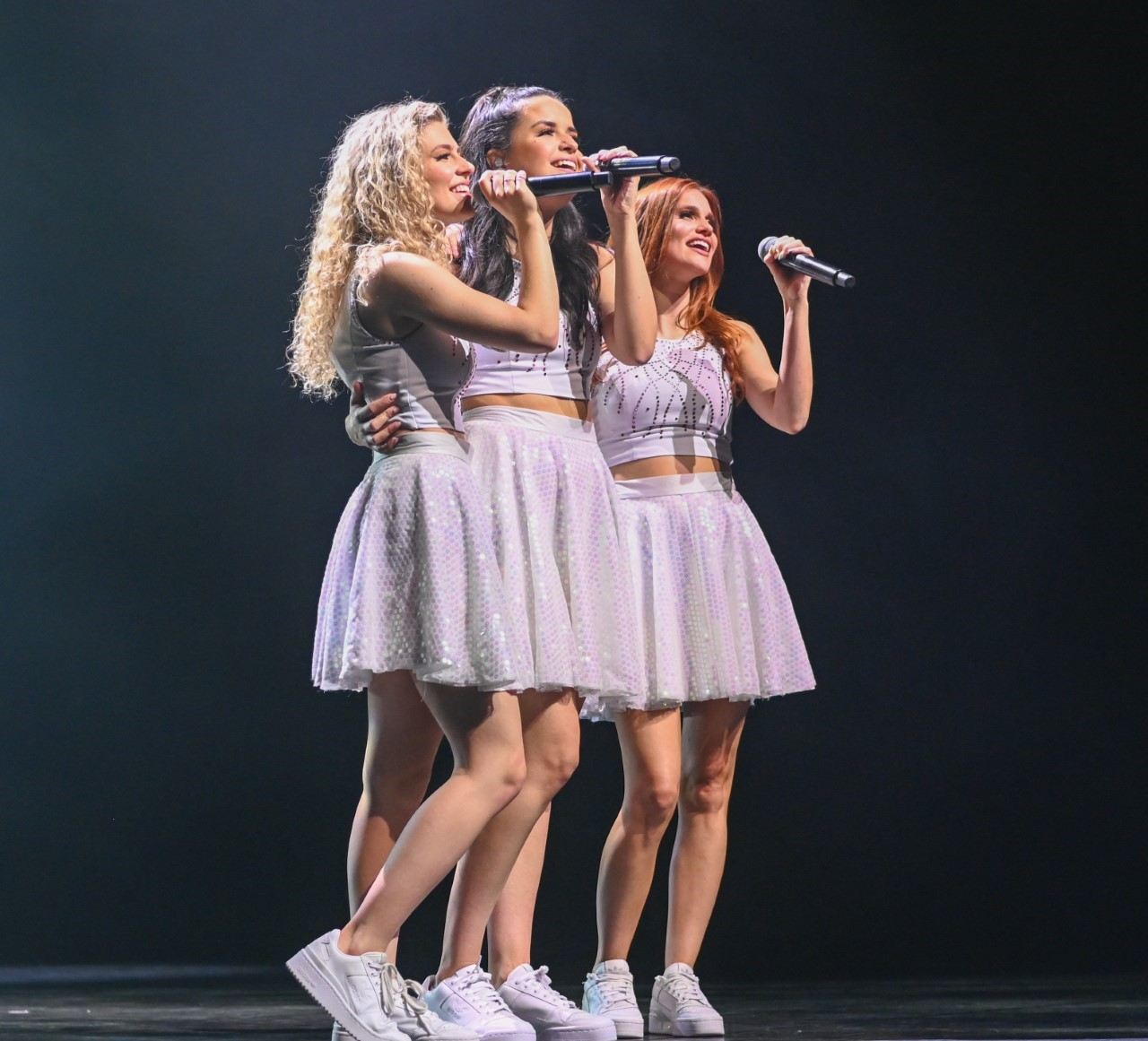
- Julia, Marthe and Hanne

Background information
- Also known as: Mascara
- Origin: Belgium
- Genre: Pop
- Instrument: Vocals
- Works: K3 discography
- Years active: 1998–present
- Labels: BMG (1999–2002); Studio 100 (2002–present)
- Members: Julia Boschman; Marthe De Pillecyn; Hanne Verbruggen
- Past members: Kathleen Aerts; Karen Damen; Josje Huisman; Klaasje Meijer; Kristel Verbeke
- Website: studio100.com/be/nl

K3 is a Belgian-Dutch girl group with a Dutch-language pop repertoire, consisting of Hanne Verbruggen, Marthe De Pillecyn and Julia Boschman. In addition to music, they are also central to many films, television series and musicals. The signature style and iconicity of K3 rely on all three girls mostly wearing the same outfit, and they are traditionally a redhead, a brunette, and a blonde. Throughout its career, K3 has built a space within Dutch and Belgian pop culture, becoming one of the most successful groups of the Benelux. The group's name is derived from the first letters of the three first members from 1998: Karen Damen, Kristel Verbeke, and Kathleen Aerts.

Aerts stepped out of the formation in March 2009. She was replaced by Josje Huisman later that year after winning the audition reality show K2 Zoekt K3. On 6 November 2015 Damen, Verbeke and Huisman were succeeded by Hanne Verbruggen, Klaasje Meijer and Marthe De Pillecyn after they became the winners of K3 Zoekt K3. In February 2021 Meijer announced her departure from K3 and another audition reality show was held in the same year to find a new member. Of more than 22,000 participants, Julia Boschman won the contest and became part of the group.

== History ==
=== Rise to fame (1998–2002) ===
The band was started by Niels William in 1997. It was first named Mascara and consisted of Karen Damen, Kristel Verbeke and Kelly Cobbaut. Their intention was to form a kind of Flemish version of the "Spice Girls". Because of their first names, they were often already referred as K3. In 1998, Cobbaut left the group to go to college. She was supposed to be replaced by Deborah Ostrega, but she immediately withdrew after she signed the contract, because she didn't want to sing in Dutch. Ultimately, William managed to find Kathleen Aerts as a replacement and because again someone joined with a 'K' as the initial letter, they decided to change the name of the band officially to K3 on 13 November 1998. The first single was "Wat ik wil" (What I want). This release was not very successful.

In 1999, K3 participated in the selection for the Belgian entry for the Eurovision Song Contest with their song "Heyah Mama". The song was not well received by one of the judges, who called the girls "assorted meat products". Notwithstanding, "Heyah Mama" was released as a single and became the first big hit for the band, peaking at the number two spot of the Flemish Ultratop 50 chart, charting 25 weeks. Its popularity grew rapidly. About a year after becoming famous in Flanders, K3 also became famous in the Netherlands.

K3 is noted for being the first pop act to break through to the top of the charts without receiving any airplay from the regular music television channels. Their songwriters became Miguel Wiels, Alain Vande Putte and Peter Gillis.

=== Joining Studio 100 (2002–2009) ===
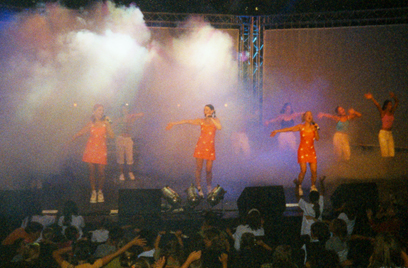
K3 performance - Oostende - 2001

In 2002, Niels William sold the band to Studio 100, a Flemish television production company for Dutch and Belgian programs, movies and musicals.

K3 provided many hits, they had released nine albums. Their eighth album Ya Ya Yippee sold more than 50,000 copies in pre-sales within the Benelux. The ninth album, Kusjes (Kisses), sold 20,000. They also released several DVD's with video clips, musicals, films and with specially recorded footage. K3 has a children's television program called De wereld van K3 (K3's World).

In 2006, a party was held at Plopsaland, a popular theme park, to celebrate the tenth anniversary of Studio 100. At the event Damen, Verbeke and Aerts opened the K3 Museum which provides an overview of their career. There are interviews, clothes, and props from the films to be seen, including the air scooters from the film K3 en het Magische Medaillon (K3 and the magic medallion). Their gold and platinum certifications can also be seen.

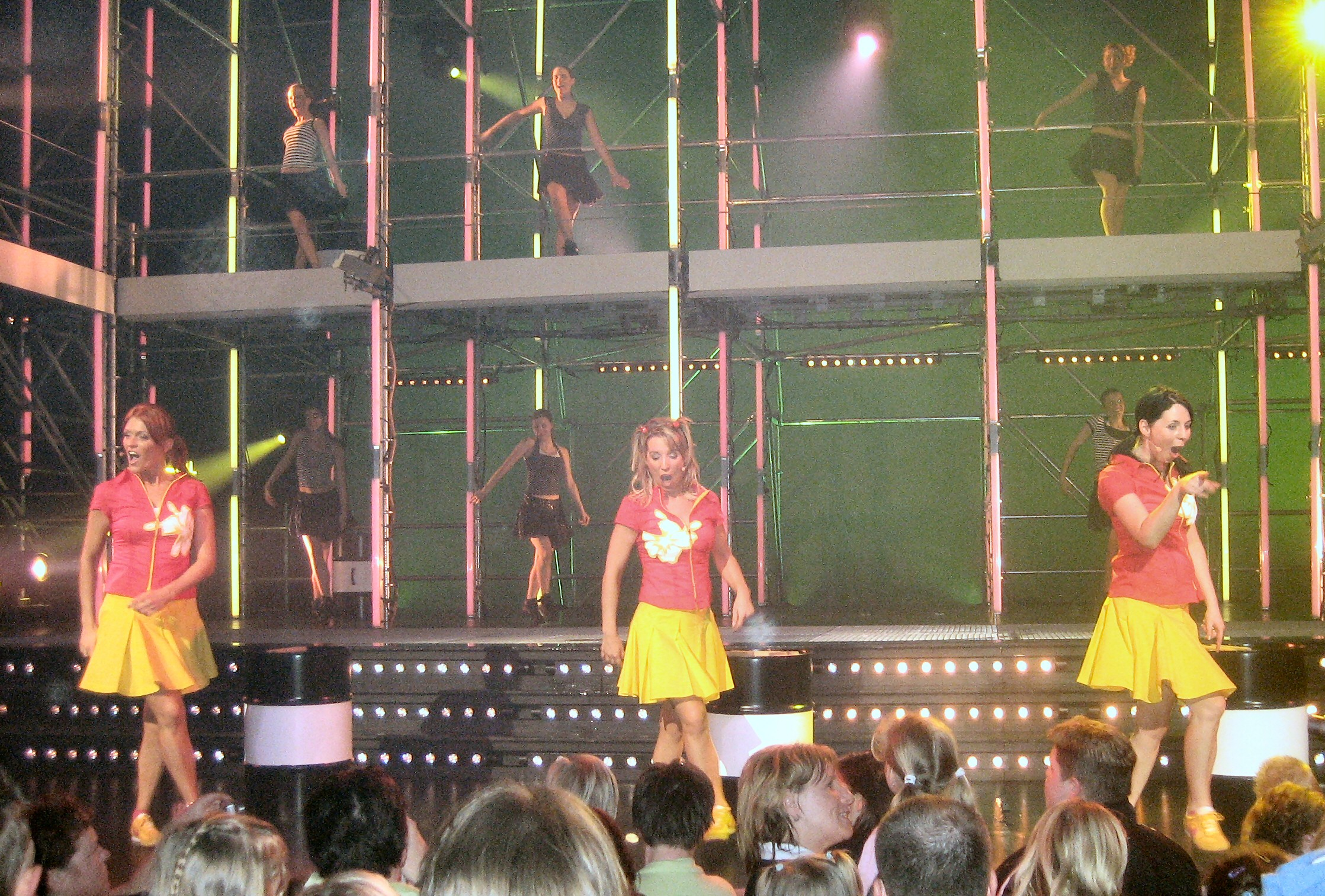
K3 performance - Hasselt - 2006

In 2007, a team from Madame Tussauds in London took measurements of the band members for wax statues. K3 unveiled these at Madame Tussauds Amsterdam the same year. In 2008, the band celebrated their 10-year anniversary with the show 10 jaar K3 (10 years of K3). It was also celebrated in Plopsaland.

=== Line-up change (2009) ===
On 23 March 2009 Aerts announced her departure at a press conference. "It was a tough decision, after all, I gave the best years of my life to K3. People change and life is constantly in motion; I'm 30 now and after ten years it's time to move on". She made her last two appearances with K3 in June at a Studio 100 showcase at the Rotterdam Ahoy.

Damen and Verbeke then searched for a replacement on television through a talent show called 'K2 zoekt K3' ('K2 searching for K3'). In the final episode, Josje Huisman was chosen as the newest member of K3.

=== Further success (2010–2014) ===
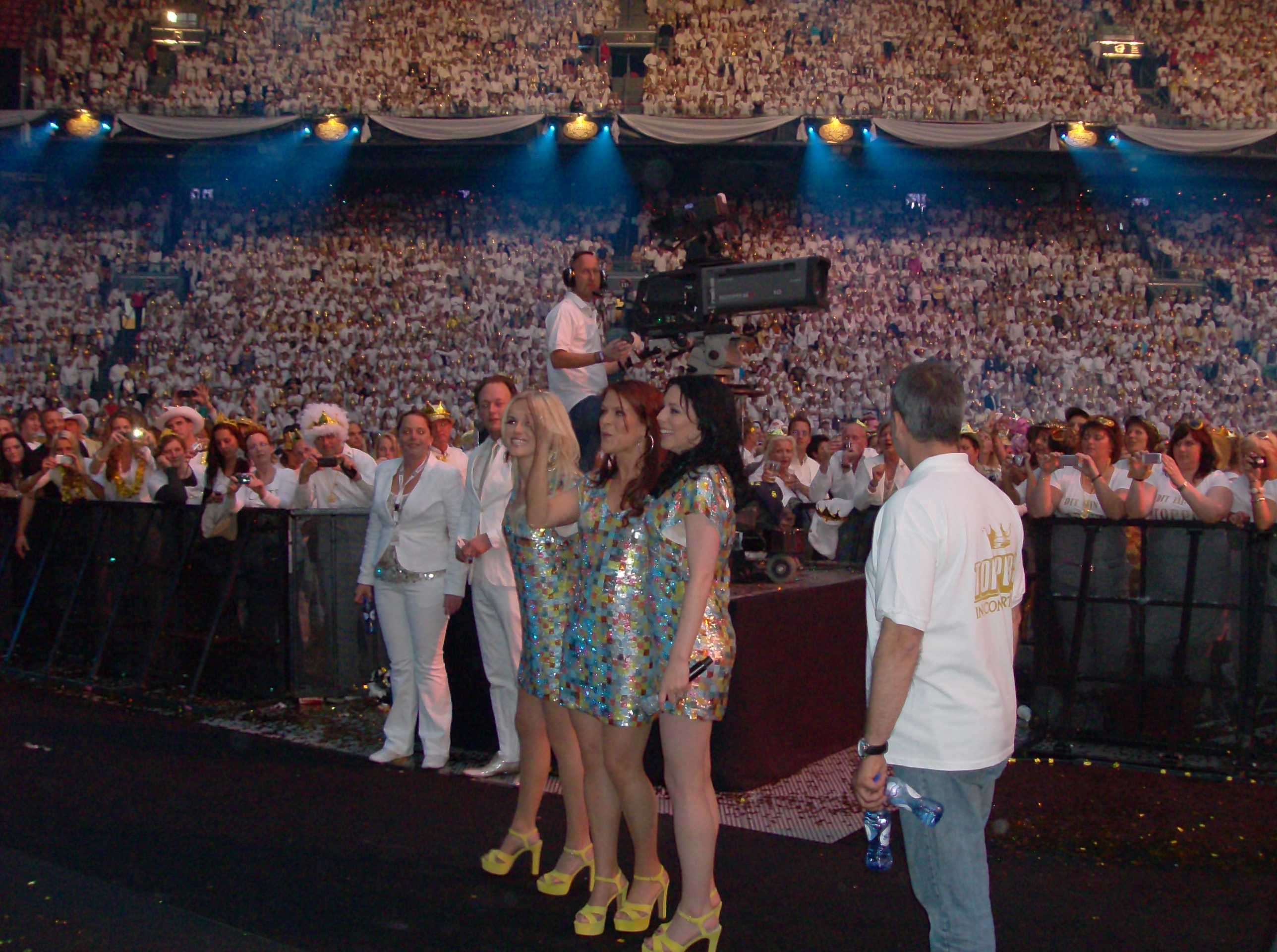
K3 guest performance - Amsterdam - 2011

The first single with Huisman as part of the group, "MaMaSé!", became a smash hit, peaking at number one for six consecutive weeks in The Netherlands and for seven weeks in Belgium. It listed in the top three of both countries' year-end charts. The album of the same name entered the year-end album chart in both countries in 2009, 2010 and 2011.

In 2010, K3 shot new episodes for their kids-talkshow (now with Huisman) and also started their own sitcom called "Hello K3", in which they portray fictional versions of themselves living in the same building and trying to balance a normal life with being superstars. A new single with the same name was also released on the album Eyo!.

In 2011 they starred in the first 3D-musical in the world, based in Lewis Carrol's Alice in Wonderland. In 2012 they released their album Engeltjes (little angels) accompanied by their fourth movie K3 Bengeltjes. In 2013, they released their album Loko Le and their fifth movie K3 Dierenhotel (K3 Animalhotel).

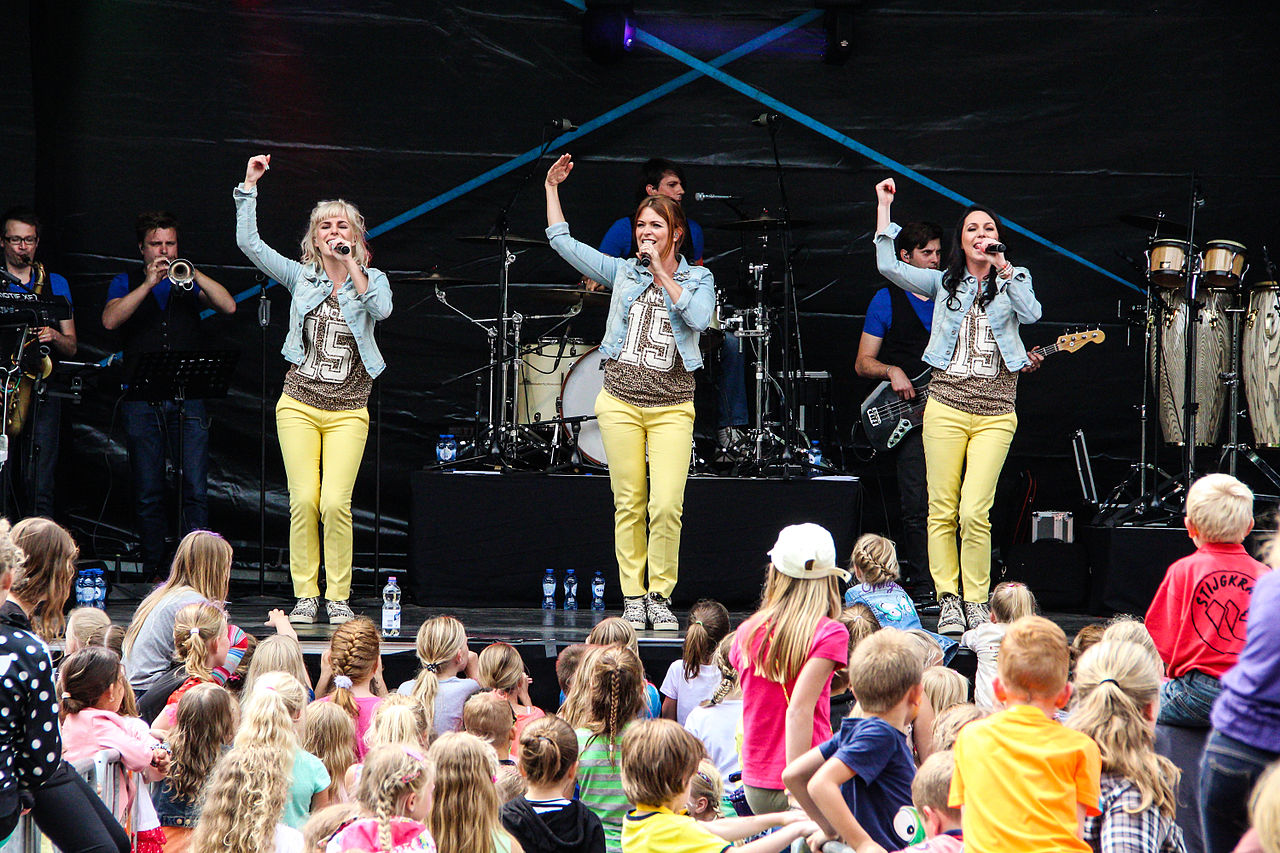
K3 performance - Drenthe - 2014

In 2014 they also started a new unscripted TV-show, 'K3 kan het!' (K3 can do it!'), in which they travel through Belgium and the Netherlands to help children fulfill their dreams.

=== The new K3 (2015–2021) ===
On 18 March 2015 Damen, Verbeke and Huisman announced through a press conference that they were all leaving the group stating "since we started, we knew there would be a time which we would feel that it was the accurate moment to stop; well, that moment is now present". K3's label has announced that they'll look for new members in late 2015. A second audition television show, K3 Zoekt K3, premiered in autumn to find the new K3 members. On 6 November 2015 Hanne Verbruggen, Klaasje Meijer and Marthe De Pillecyn had been chosen as Damen, Verbeke and Huisman's successors (respectively) and would become the new K3. They were chosen from 6,081 girls.

From autumn 2015, the old and the new K3 went on tour together. For Damen, Verbeke and Huisman this was a farewell tour, for the new trio it was the start of their new career. The tour with double occupancy was a great success and was extended, there was also a special 'adult evening show' with standing room. Kristel Verbeke became the manager of the new K3 for the first two years.

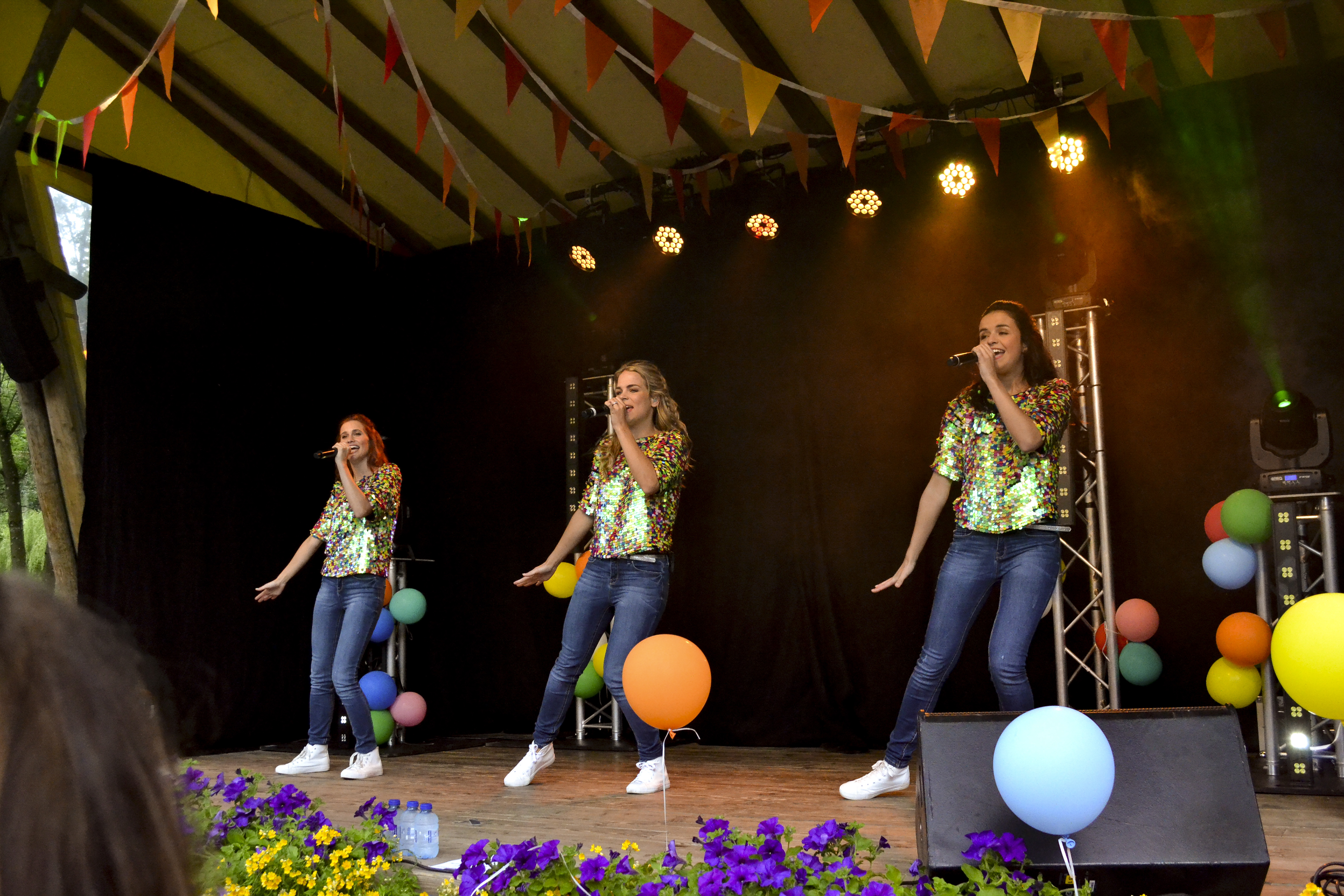
K3 performance - Plopsaland - 2016

Verbruggen, Meijer and De Pillecyn's first release, "10.000 Luchtballonnen" topped the charts in Belgium and The Netherlands, becoming 8× Platinum. The music video of the single also broke the Belgian YouTube record. Five more albums followed. In 2016, their own animated series De Avonturen van K3 (The adventures of K3) premiered. That same year there came a new children's television program called Iedereen K3 (Everyone K3). It was the successor to De wereld van K3 (K3's World). In August they won the 'Radio 2 Zomerhit' award with their summer single "Ushuaia". At the end of 2016, the special Het dagboek van K3 (The Diary of K3) was released, in which K3 looks back on the past year. This was an annual tradition until 2018. The 2016 Story Awards were presented in the Trixxo Arena, K3 won both the award for 'Favorite newcomer' and being the best 'Female Singer of the Year'.

In 2017, K3 started vlogging, leading to a bi-weekly tradition on YouTube and VTM. That same year, the new K3 got their first movie called K3 Love Cruise and there was a new special: Overal K3 (Everywhere K3), in which Verbruggen, Meijer and De Pillecyn showed more of themselves and talked about the impact of K3 on their private lives. In March 2018, there was a collaboration with the singer Jan Smit. They recorded a single together and K3 performed as guest artists at his concert at the sportpaleis.

The fiction series K3 Roller Disco, was released on 31 October 2018. It's a spin-off of 'Hello K3', including a same character and actor from the sitcom. For the first time in history, K3 has started roller skating, which is reflected in the Roller Disco series, their video clip of the title song and on stage during their tour in 2018. On their third album, Meijer played along on her flute, becoming the only K3 member to ever play an instrument by herself on the songs. She also did it on stage during various K3 performances/shows. From 2018, K3 became television judges/coaches on seasons four and five of the Flemish version of The Voice Kids.

In 2019, the band celebrated their 20th anniversary with a spectacle show with moving stands, stages and LED Walls. Includes a moving car, light-up outfits and more than 80 dancers. In May they opened their own roller coaster in Plopsaland named 'K3 Roller Skater' themed around their roller skates and their fiction series.

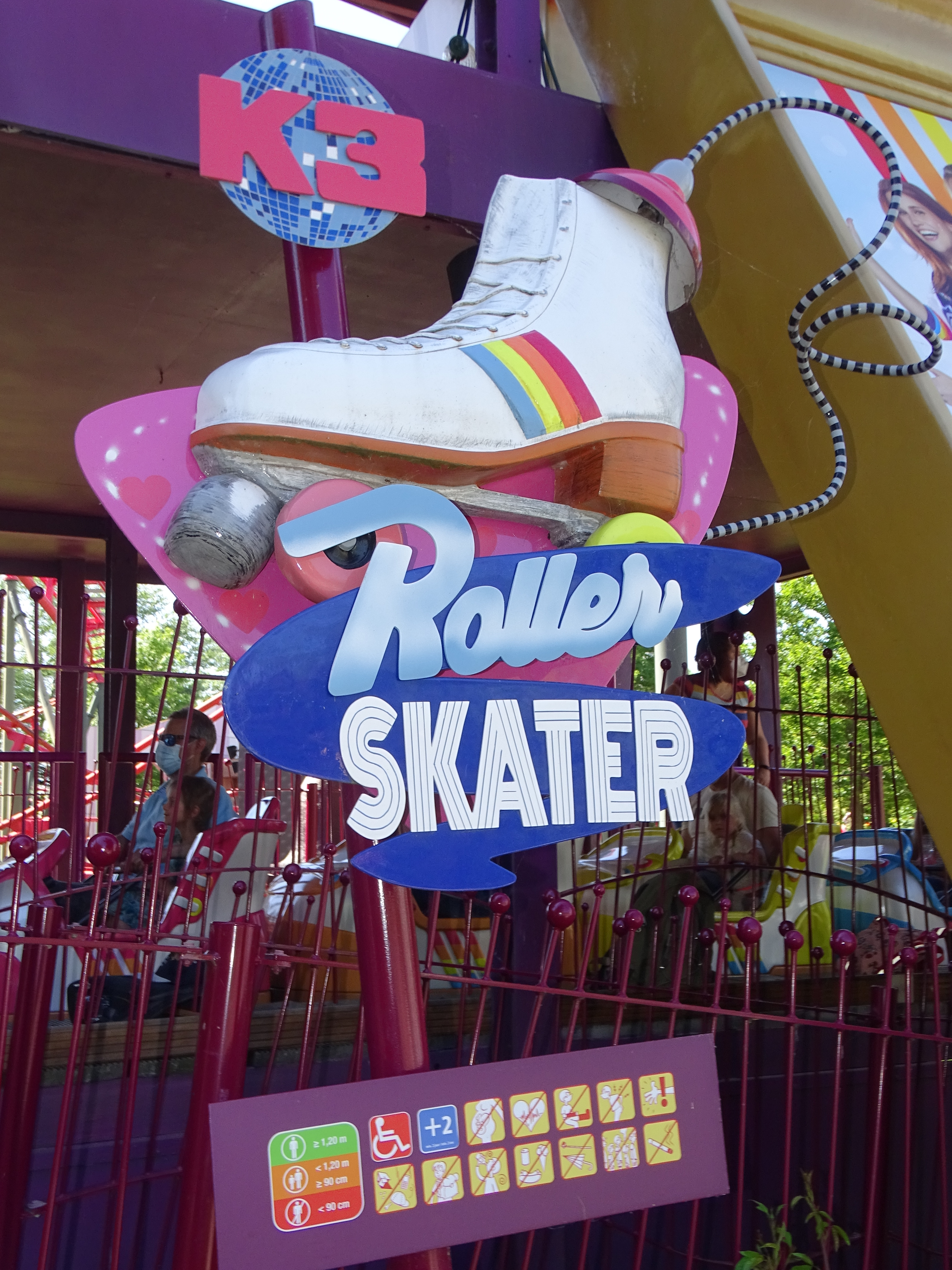
Entrance of roller coaster 'K3 Roller Skater' in Plopsaland

Initially, a new tour was planned to follow in the spring of 2020, but due to the COVID-19 pandemic in Europe, this tour was postponed to the autumn of 2021. Responding to the crisis, K3 released a new version of their song 'Handjes draaien' (Turning hands) entitled 'Handjes wassen' (Wash hands) to children to explain a little about the disease and provide them with some support.

That same year, Verbruggen, Meijer and De Pillecyn recorded their second cinema movie K3 Dans van de Farao (K3 Dance of the Pharaoh). After postponement, the movie premiered in June 2021. At the same time a sports event started in collaboration with the sports policy board of the Flemish government and Studio 100, called the K3 Run & Fun. In which there are various sports activities and performances by guests, including K3 and they are also the presenters. Due to its success, the K3 Run & Fun has grown into an annual event in Flanders. In 2023, it was also organized in the Netherlands.

From 2020, K3 became part of the rhythm game series Just Dance with their singles '10.000 luchtballonnen' and 'Dans van de Farao' in Just Dance 2020 and Just Dance 2021, respectively.

=== Search for new member (2021) ===
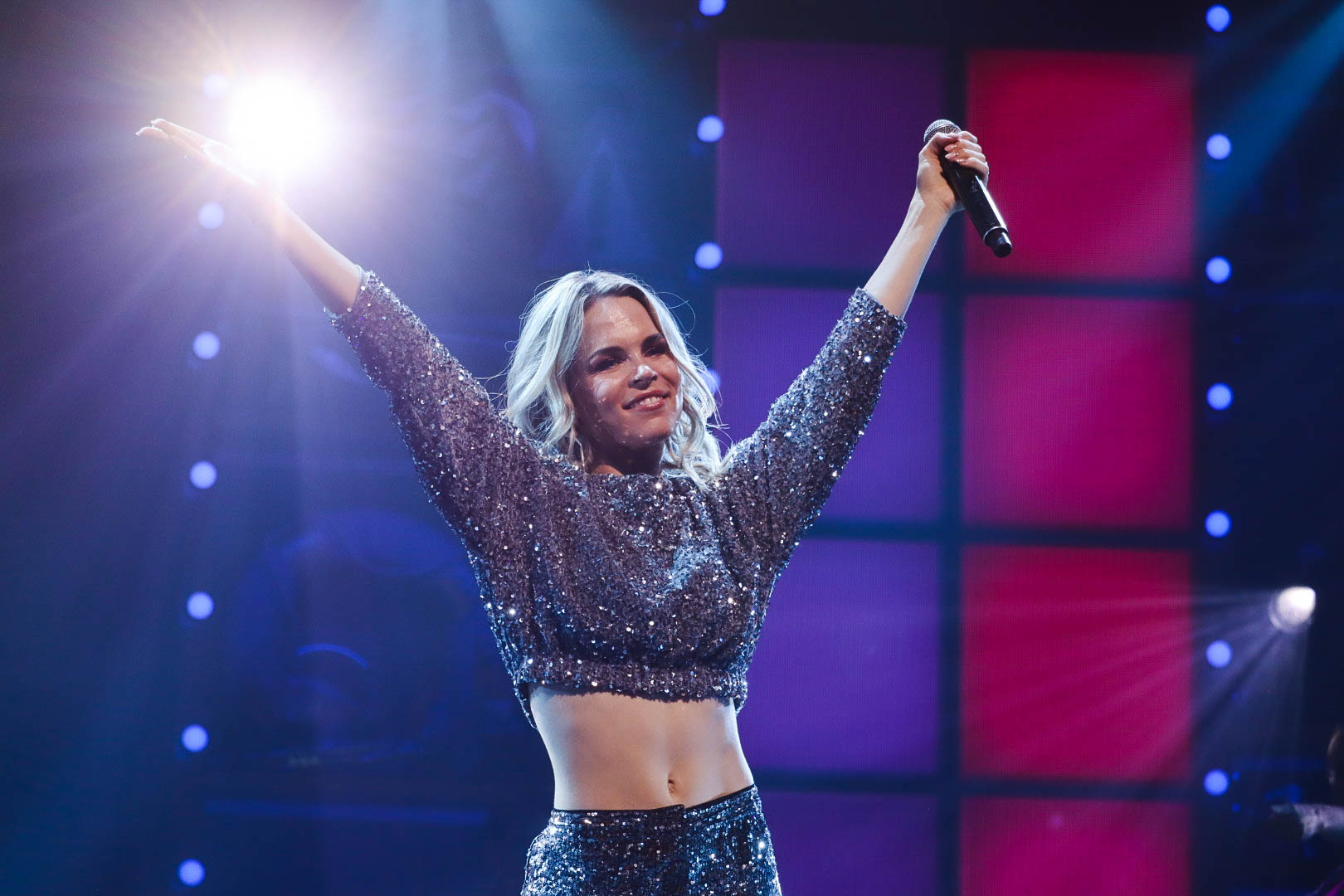
Meijer during her last show with K3

On 9 February 2021, Meijer announced her departure from K3. "K3's life is fantastic, but I feel it's time now to spread my wings; just as there is a beginning and an end for everything, now the time has come for me to look further and broaden my horizons. I will miss Hanne and Marthe enormously". She fulfilled the 2021 group schedules up until the last quarter, including a farewell tour. The last performance of Verbruggen, Meijer and De Pillecyn together as K3 was on 6 November 2021 at the Sportpaleis for 'Back to the Nineties and Nillies', the same date on which they became K3 six years ago.

The label, Studio 100, announced a new member will be cast through a survival show similar to K2 zoekt K3 and K3 zoekt K3. For the first time, both sexes are qualified to join the group. In September 2021, the renewed 'K2 zoekt K3' appeared on Belgian and Dutch television. The audition shows are similar to those of The Voice. The final was on 27 November 2021, where Meijer was also present. De Pillecyn had tested positive for the coronavirus and could not be physically present, she performed by video connection. Ultimately, 19-year-old Julia Boschman became the winner, who was chosen as the new member of K3 from a total of 22,690 candidates.

=== Further success (2022–) ===
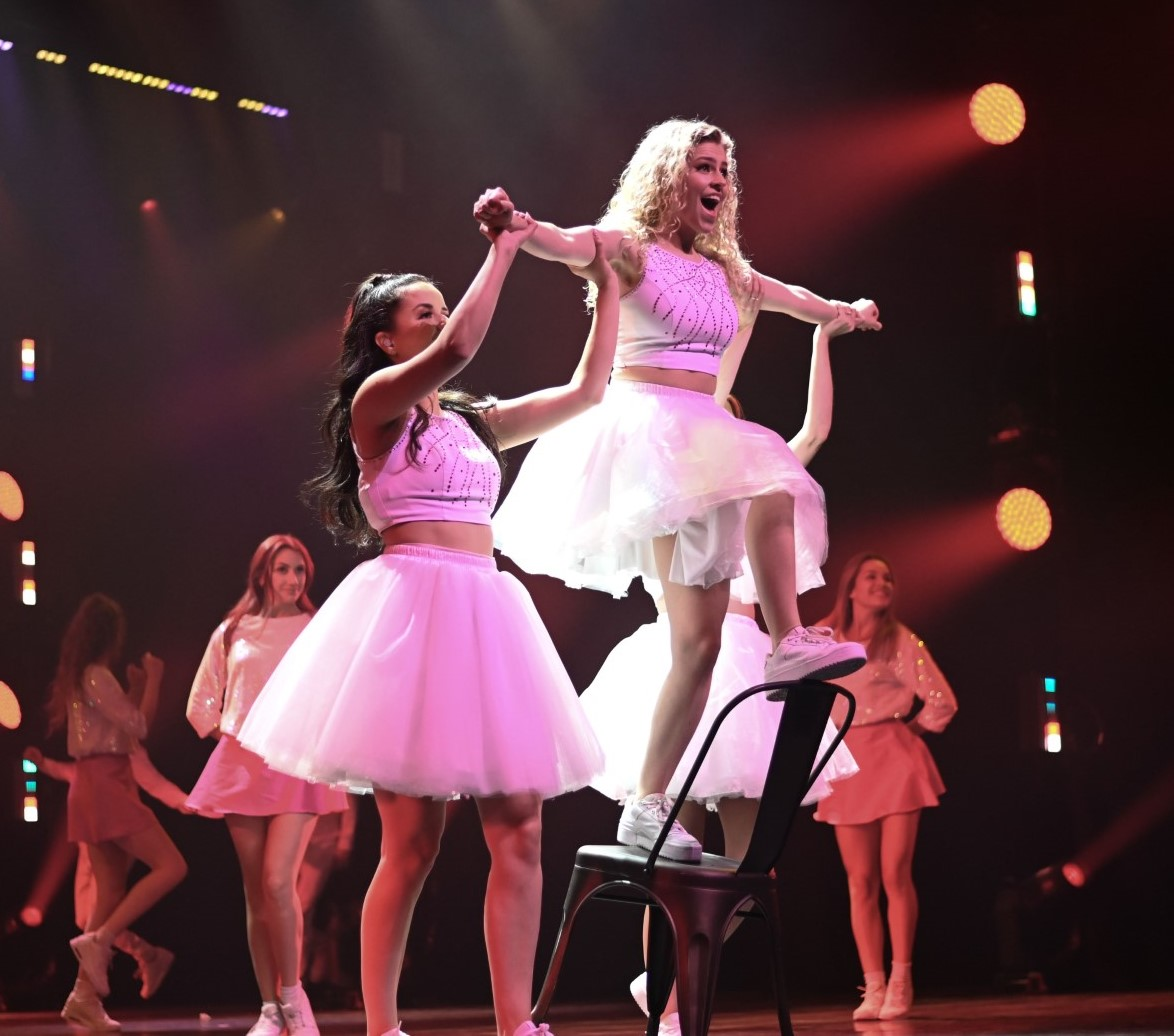
K3 during their first show with Boschman

The first single with Boschman, 'Waterval', was released the same evening and became a great success. Also reached the highest position in the charts in Flanders. It won the "Song of the Year" award. The album of the same name also reached a peak in the Album Charts in Belgium and the Netherlands, with 12,000,000 streams. Their song 'Waterval' then featured in Just Dance 2022.

Now with Boschman, they were again television judges/coaches of The Voice Kids in Flanders for season six and they also continued vlogging and releasing music videos of their songs. Verbruggen, De Pillecyn and Boschman's first show tour together, premiered on 4 March 2022 in Belgium. They also did a separate live concert in July. After the summer their show tour continued in The Netherlands, but after a number of shows it turned out to be too difficult for the heavily pregnant Verbruggen to continue. After which it was decided in October that K2 zoekt K3-finalist Diede van den Heuvel would fill in for her for the rest of the shows of the 2022 tour.

The song and album 'Vleugels' was released in November, for which they received a gold record. The song was then featured in Just Dance 2023 Edition, where they appear as the dancers in a ‘VIP Version’, instead of the typical Just Dance coaches. Since Verbruggen was still pregnant during the production process, it was the first Just Dance map to feature a visibly pregnant coach.

The same year a new TV-show, K3 Vriendenboek was released (K3 Friendship book) in which they experience adventures with older children. During the ending song of K3's performance at The Grote Sinterklaas Show in December 2022, their good friend and also the daughter of their boss Marie Verhulst, sang for Verbruggen, who had just given birth to her son at that time. On 3 December, a new special was broadcast on TV called K3, één jaar later (K3, one year later) in which they looked back on the first year with Boschman. Including Verbruggen's entire pregnancy process and the maternity visit of the two "aunts".

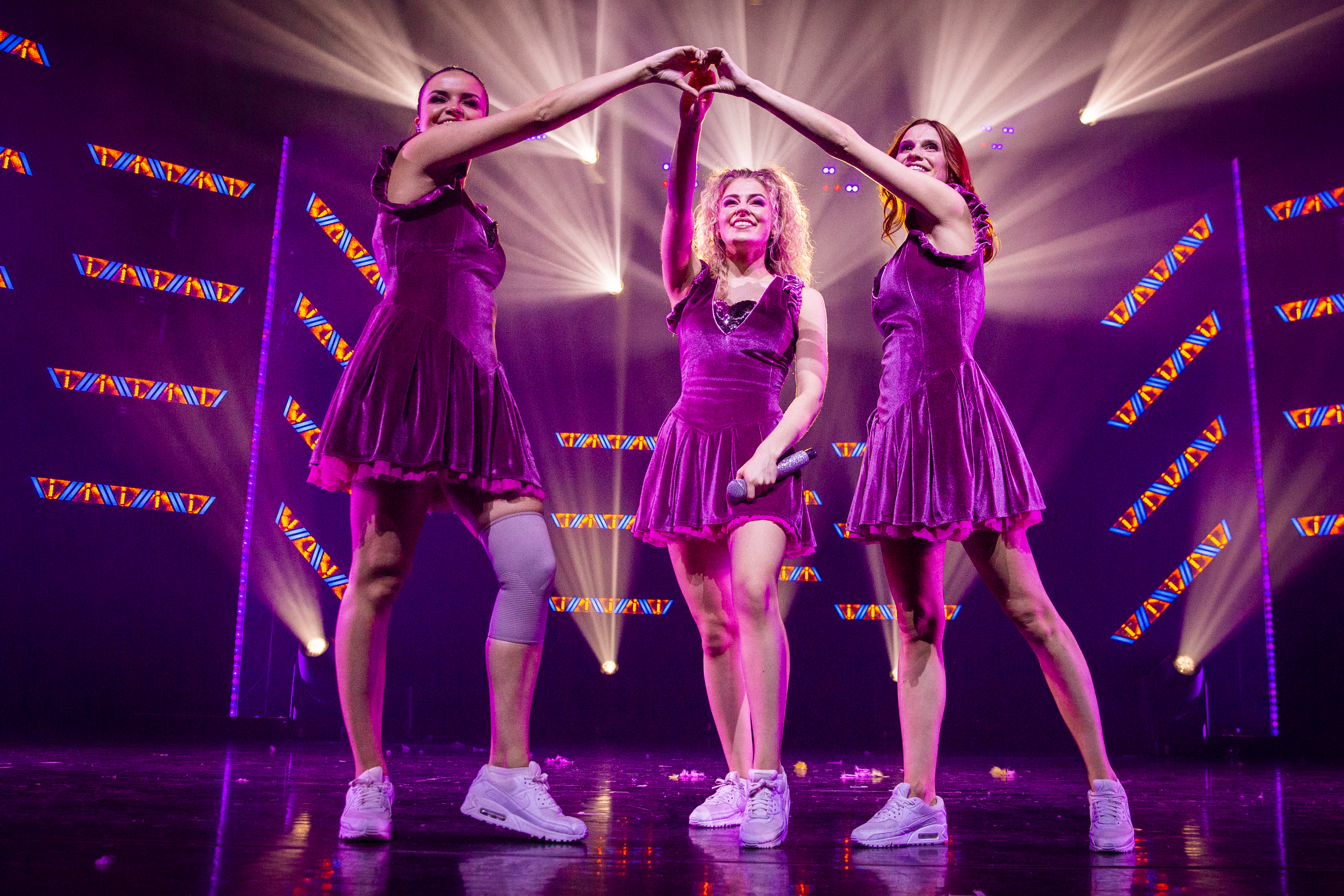
K3 performance - Almere - 2023

In February 2023, after reuniting with Verbruggen after her maternity leave, their second concert tour 'Vleugels' started and they were part of season 9 of Liefde voor muziek, the Flemish version of The Best Singers. A year later, they participated again for the anniversary edition season 10. In June 2023, K3 entered into collaboration with the Technopolis science museum, to bring music and science together. Some experiments for visitors were designed in a K3 guise. In September, a K3 fashion exhibition was organized in Wijnegem Shopping Center in honor of the group's 25th anniversary. K3 itself opened the month-long presentation, which offered an overview of various K3 garments from the past quarter century. Verbruggen, De Pillecyn and Boschman also designed their own clothing collection for clothing chain JBC for the first time in K3 history.

Part of the celebration of 25 years of K3, LP records were released with their greatest hits in history and there came the special Een terugblik op 25 jaar K3 (A look back at 25 years of K3). K3 also performed special live concerts in the summer, including two 'Live Late Night' concerts with standing room. From 1 December 2023, the Studio 100 SingAlong was launched, in which the artists from Studio 100, including K3, perform several evenings at the Sportpaleis. The show event has become an annual tradition.

The renewed K3 musical De 3 Biggetjes (The Three Little Pigs) premiered in 2024, after a major announcement 8 months earlier that the musical would return 20 years after the first performance. In April, the 'Eventim Public Prize’ for best Family Musical was won at the Musical Awards 2024. On 3 August, K3 debuted by performing at Pride Amsterdam during the Canal Parade, with also having the theme for attention/support to deafness and sign language. In the summer the first movie of Verbruggen, De Pillecyn and Boschman was shot, for which they stayed on Malta for 5 weeks. The movie called K3 en Het Lied van de Zeemeermin (K3 and the Mermaid's song) premiered in December. It was the first time a K3 film had a distant shooting location and being on an island. After Miguel Wiels had stepped away a few years earlier, songwriters Alain Vande Putte and Peter Gillis ended the collaboration in January 2025, after nearly thirty years and three hundred songs. The premiere of the Zeesterren tour took place in the Trixxo Arena in March 2025, Nora Gharib was appointed to replace De Pillecyn during her maternity leave. The same month, the first K3 members Karen Damen, Kristel Verbeke and Kathleen Aerts announced a one-off reunion with a series of concerts at the AFAS Dome and Ahoy under the name K3 Originals, during which over 300,000 tickets were sold in a record time of four hours. In the run-up to the reunion concerts, they were followed for the documentary K3 Originals: Het verhaal van Karen, Kristel en Kathleen, that it won the Kastaar! price for Newcomer of the Year in January 2026. Subsequently, Damen, Verbeke, and Aerts each received a crystal Kastaar, a new price created specifically for them and presented by the Flemish Minister-President Matthias Diependaele. During the live broadcast, Hanne Verbruggen, Marthe De Pillecyn and Julia Boschman paid also tribute to their predecessors.

In June 2025, the single 'Goden' was released and entered the Ultratop 50 Singles Flanders at number 40. The first edition of K3-Land took place during the summer, featuring a week-long evenement of the group at Plopsaland. In October, Verbruggen, De Pillecyn, and Boschman released a new version of the K3-song 'Alle kleuren' with more than thirty artists for the campaign of 11.11.11. That same month, K3 also appeared as guest detectives in the Halloween special of the The Masked Singer in flanders. In December, The Gi-Ga Gantische Christmas Show was performed for the first time in Ahoy, a collaboration between all artists from Studio 100, Efteling and De Toppers Genzee. K3 also performed the opening act for Guus Meeuwis first concert at the AFAS Dome. On 13 March 2026, the launch event for their own Roblox game took place: K3 Regenboogland. At the end of March, K3 performed during the nineteenth edition of the Schlagerfestival in Hasselt.

The premiere of the revamped Sleeping Beauty took place on 1 May 2026, at the Studio 100 Theater De Panne in Plopsaland Belgium. Less than two weeks later, the track 'Schaduw' was released in collaboration with rapper Donnie, alongside the Foute Anthem of 2026 for the Dutch radio station Qmusic. The same week, the song also received the 'Alarmschijf' title, which was the very first time ever for K3. On 3 June, the fifth summer single by Verbruggen, De Pillecyn, and Boschman was released: 'De zomer van Oya Lélé'. The single and music video are based on their own childhoods, around the time the single 'Oya Lélé' was released in the summer of 2003. In August, they won the VRT Zomerhit with it.

== Members ==
Name	Date of birth	Place of birth
Marthe De Pillecyn	16 July 1996 (age 30)	Duffel, Belgium
Hanne Verbruggen	3 March 1994 (age 32)	Mechelen, Belgium
Julia Boschman	8 June 2002 (age 24)	Bergen op Zoom, Netherlands

Signatures

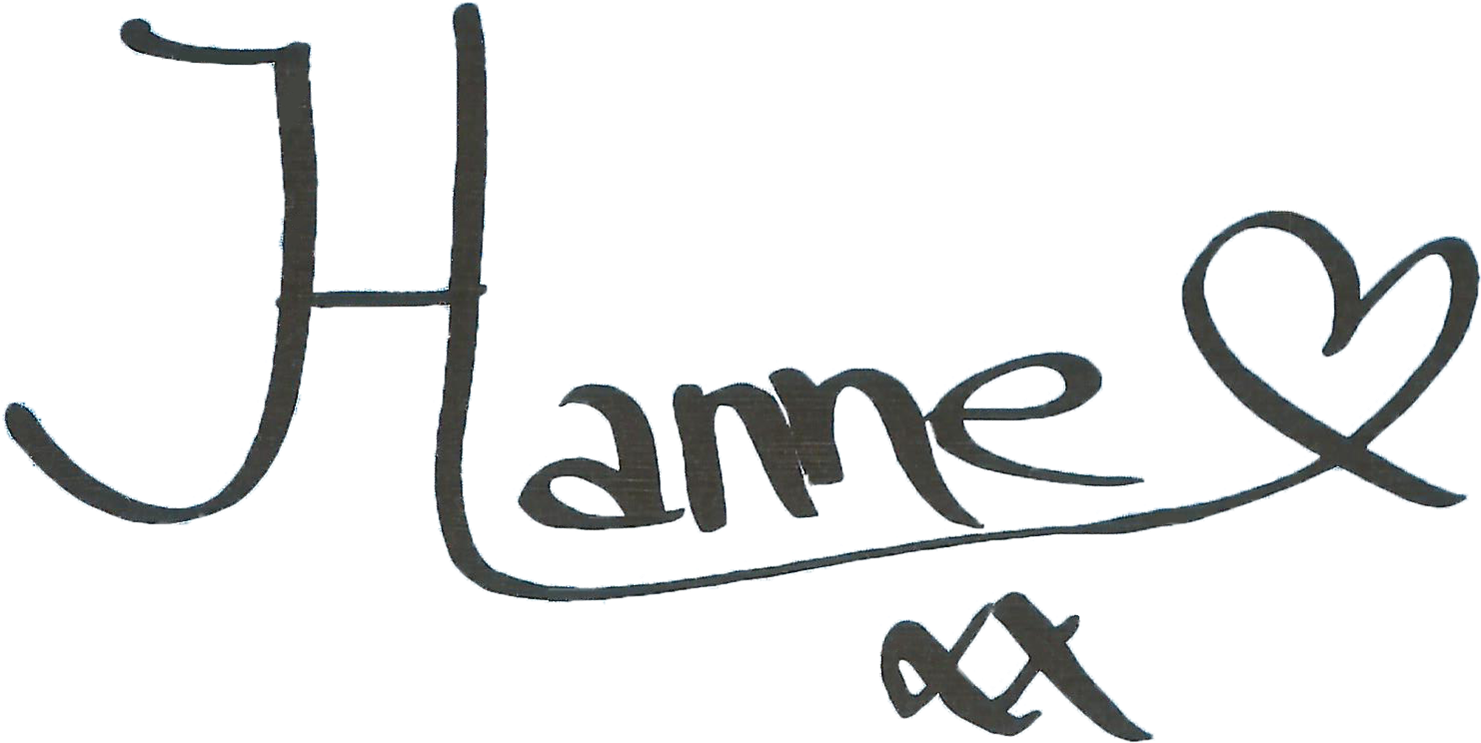

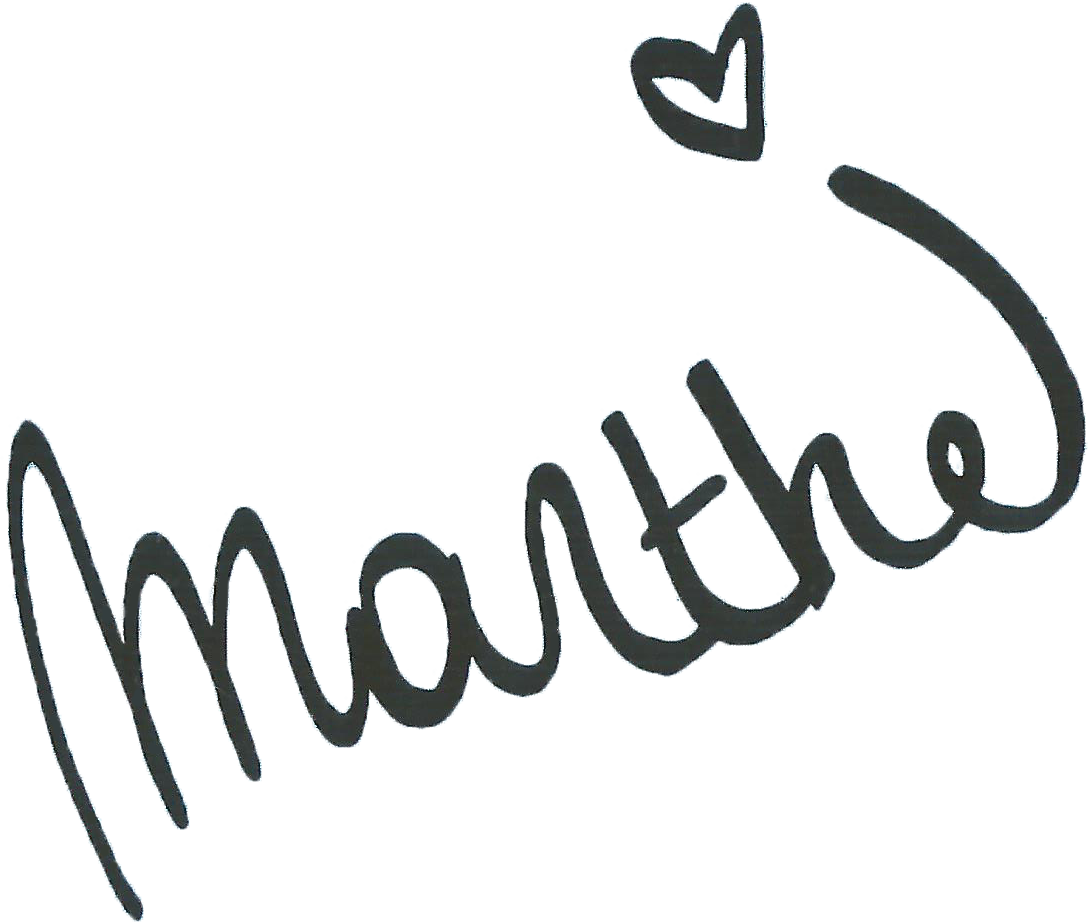

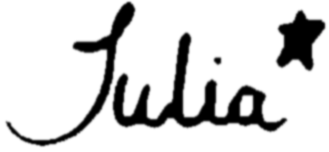

Former members

Name	Date of birth	Place of birth
Kathleen Aerts	18 June 1978 (age 48)	Geel, Belgium
Karen Damen	28 October 1974 (age 52)	Wilrijk, Belgium
Kristel Verbeke	10 December 1975 (age 50)	Hamme, Belgium
Josje Huisman	16 February 1986 (age 40)	Heusden, Netherlands
Klaasje Meijer	2 March 1995 (age 31)	Lutjegast, Netherlands

Members gallery

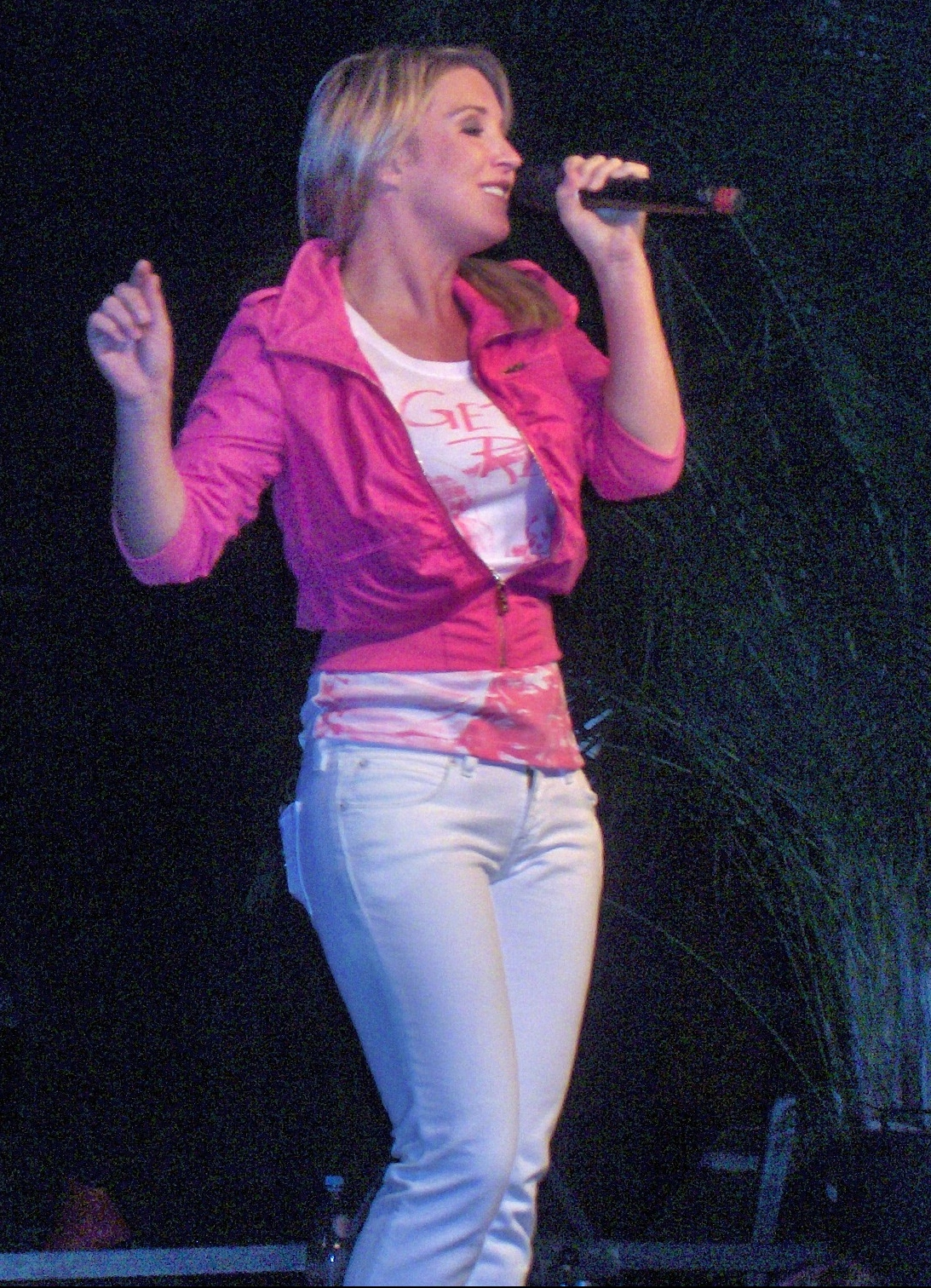
Kathleen Aerts (1998-2009)

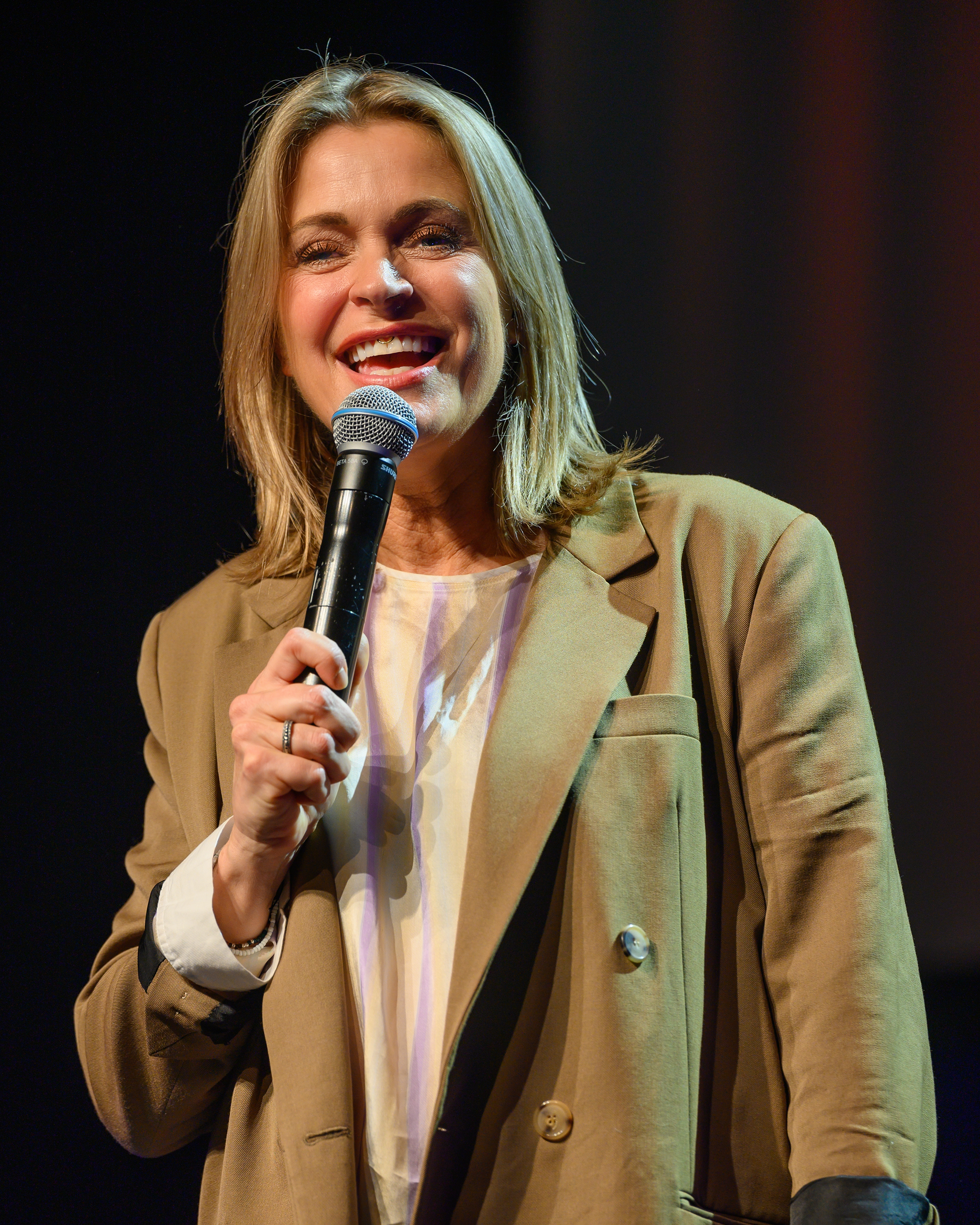
Karen Damen (1998-2015)

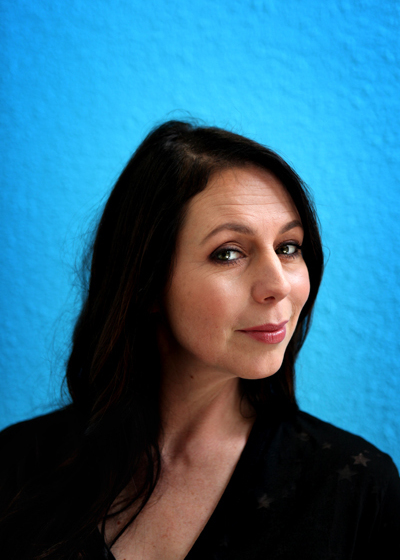
Kristel Verbeke (1998-2015)

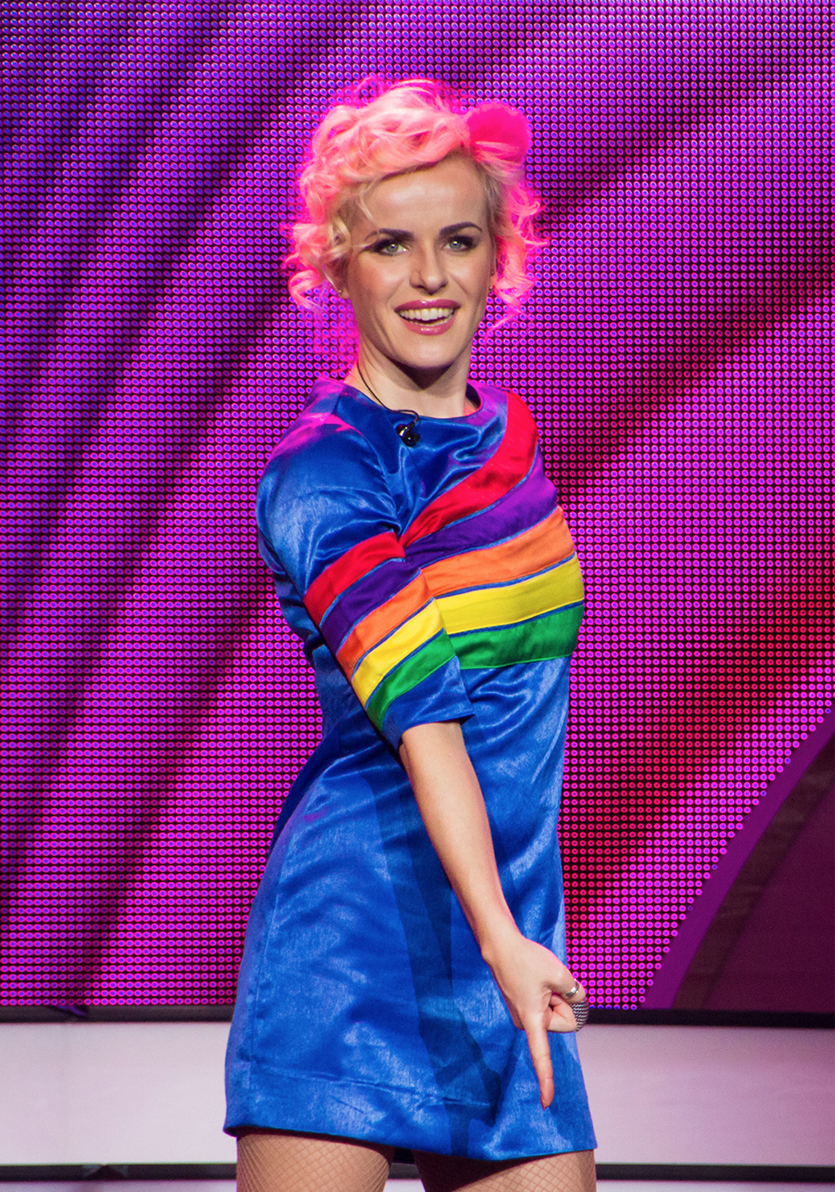
Josje Huisman (2009-2015)

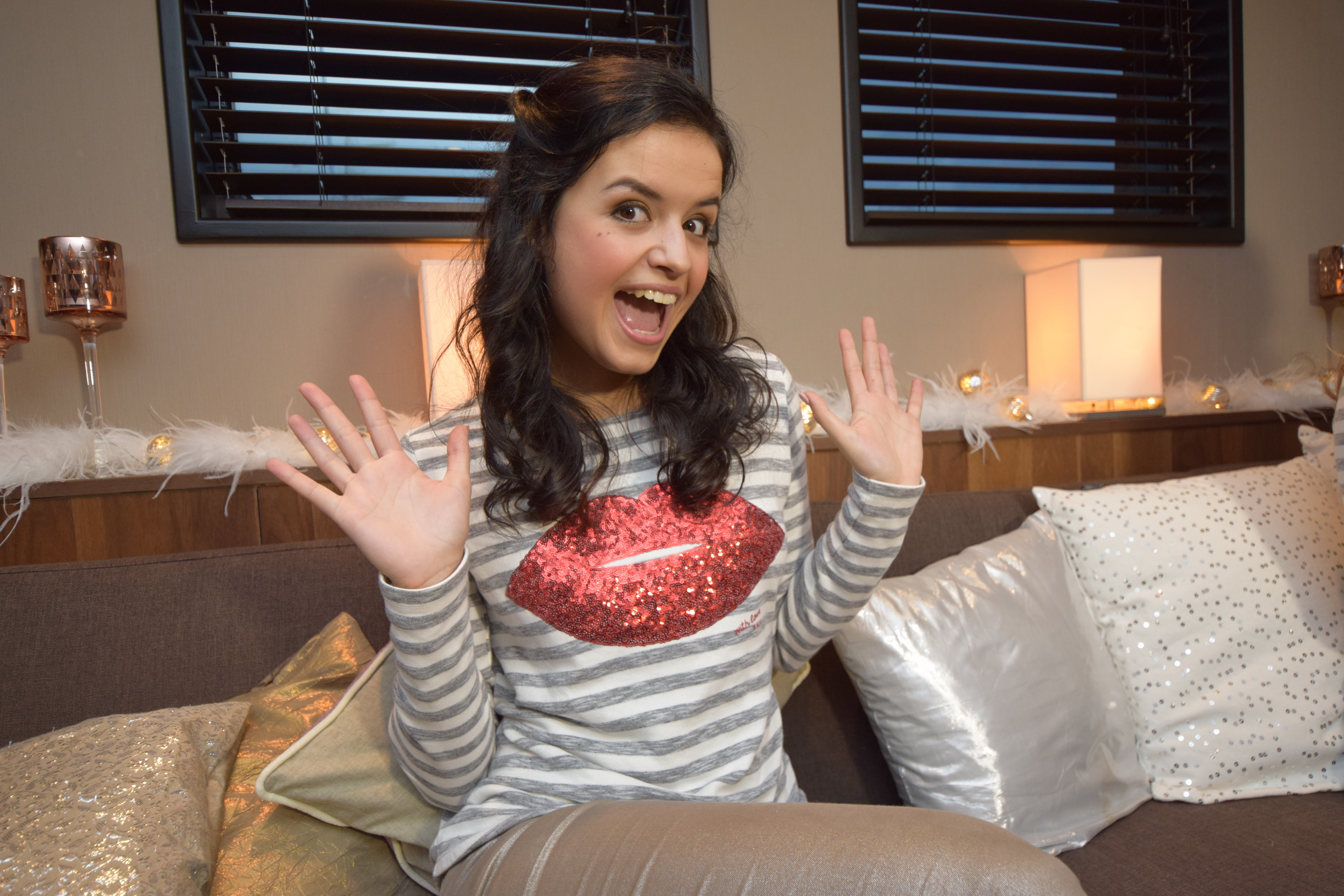
Marthe De Pillecyn (2015-)

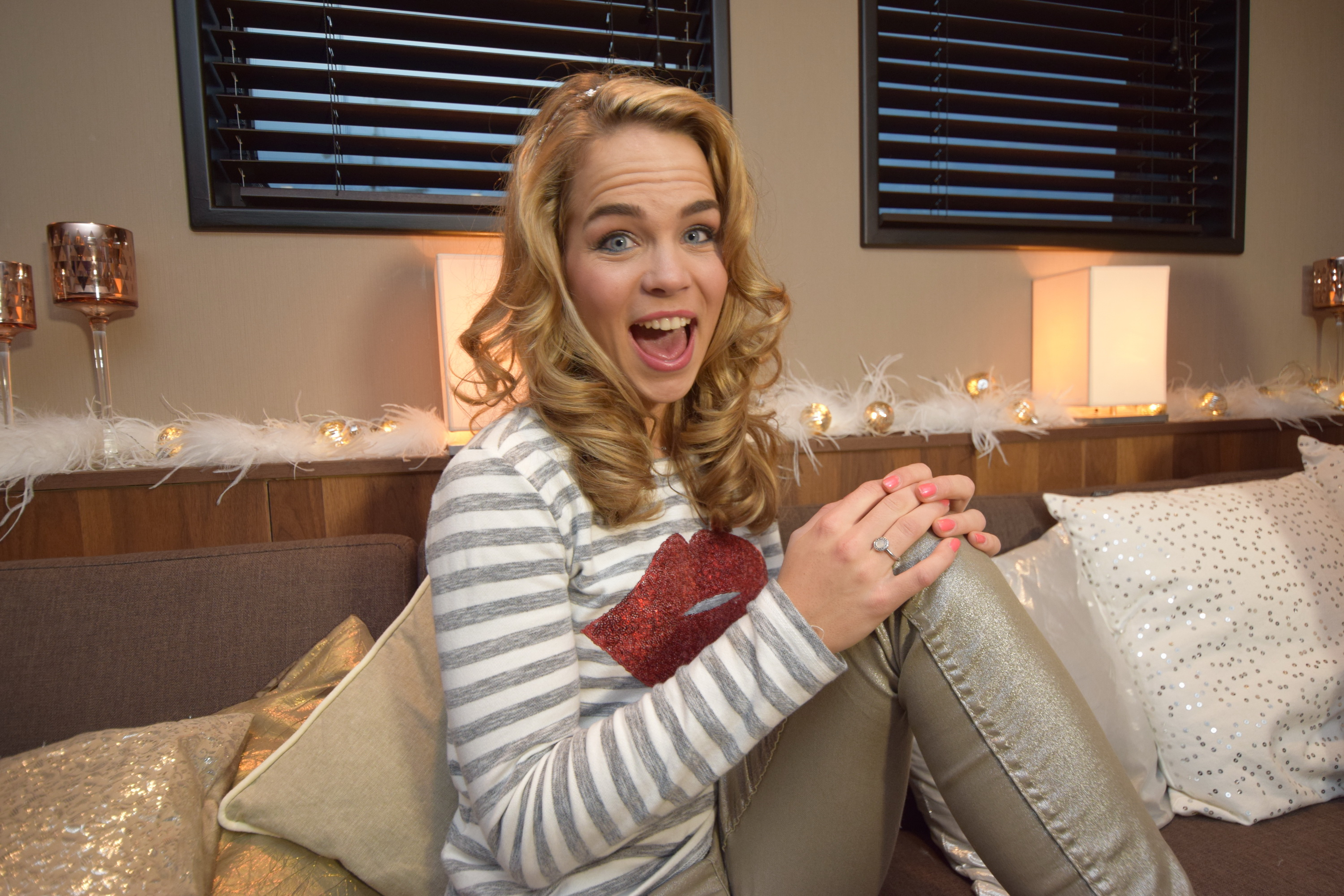
Klaasje Meijer (2015-2021)

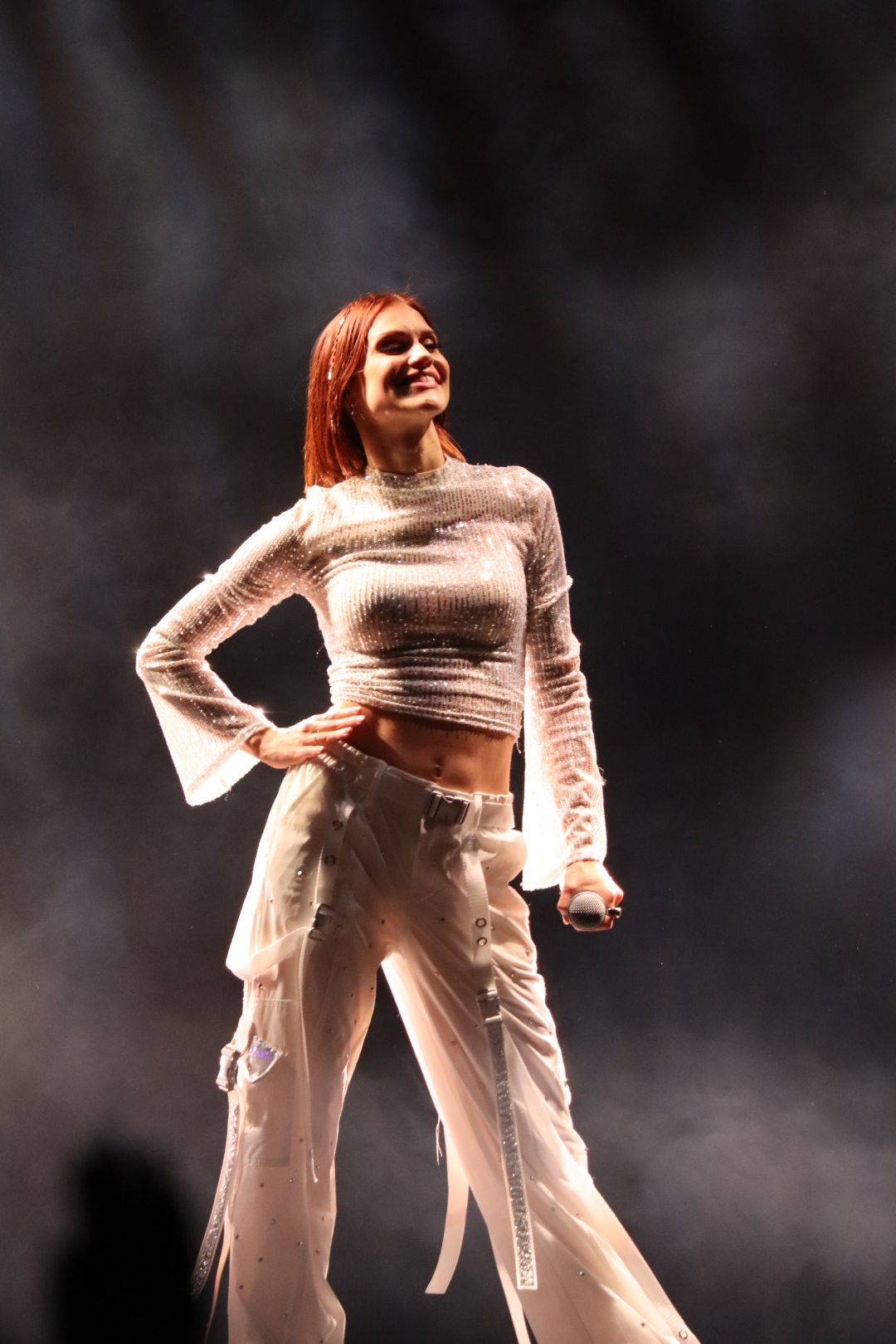
Hanne Verbruggen (2015-)

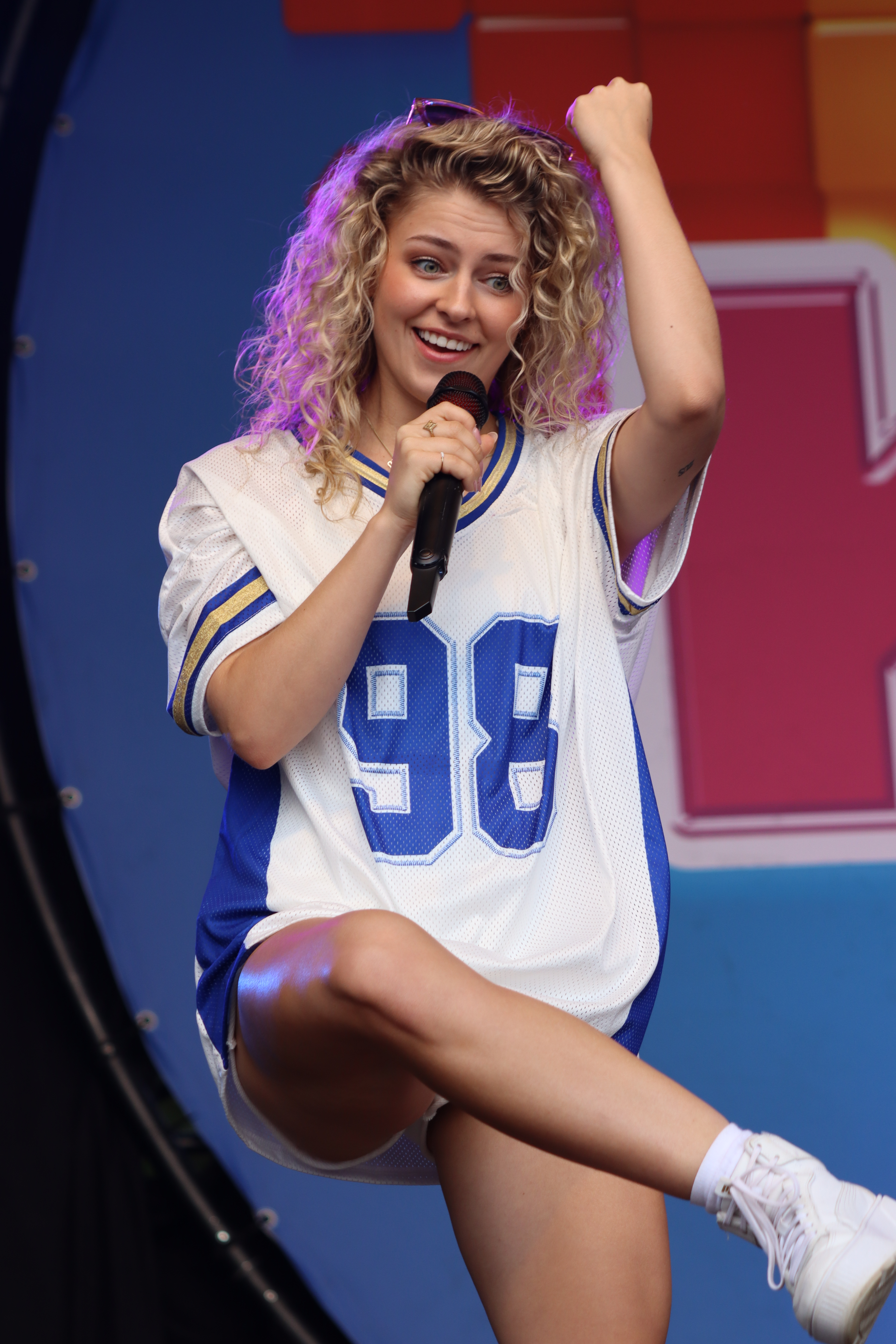
Julia Boschman (2021-)

=== Line ups ===
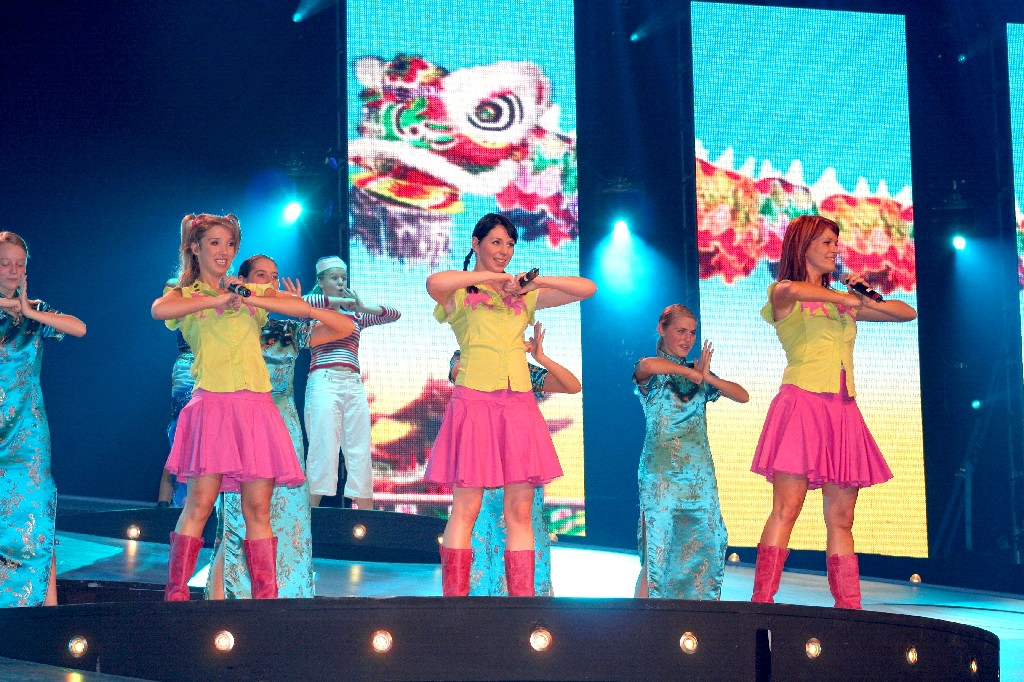
1998-2009

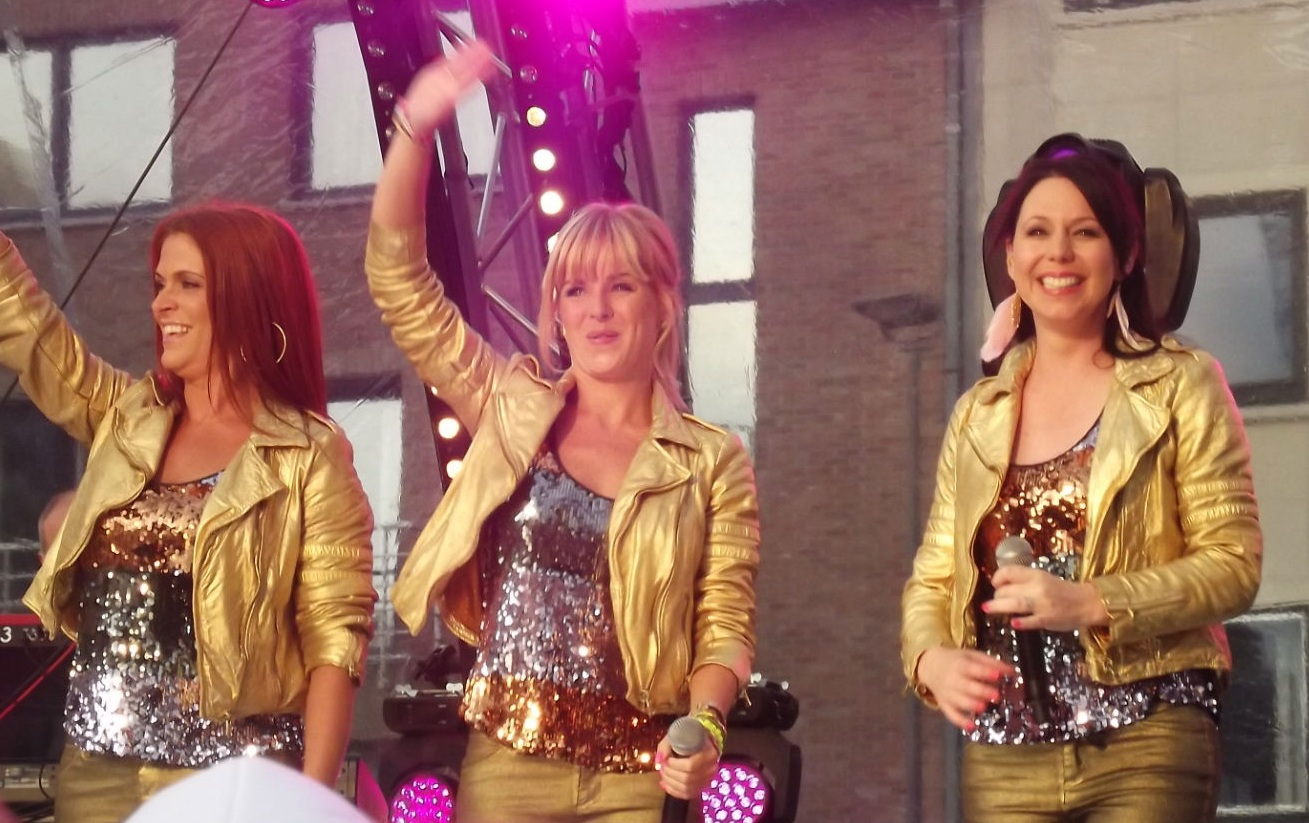
2009-2015

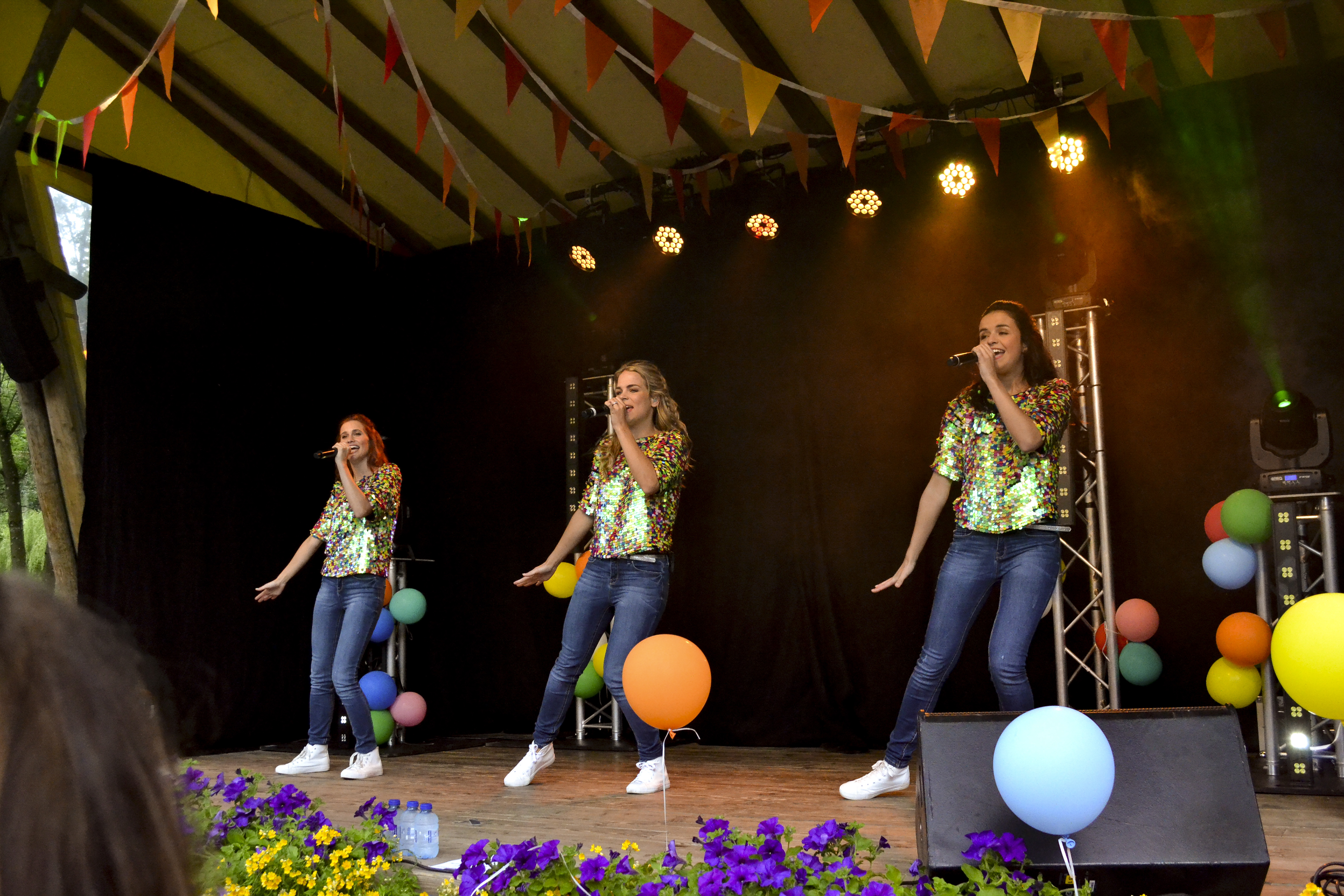
2015-2021

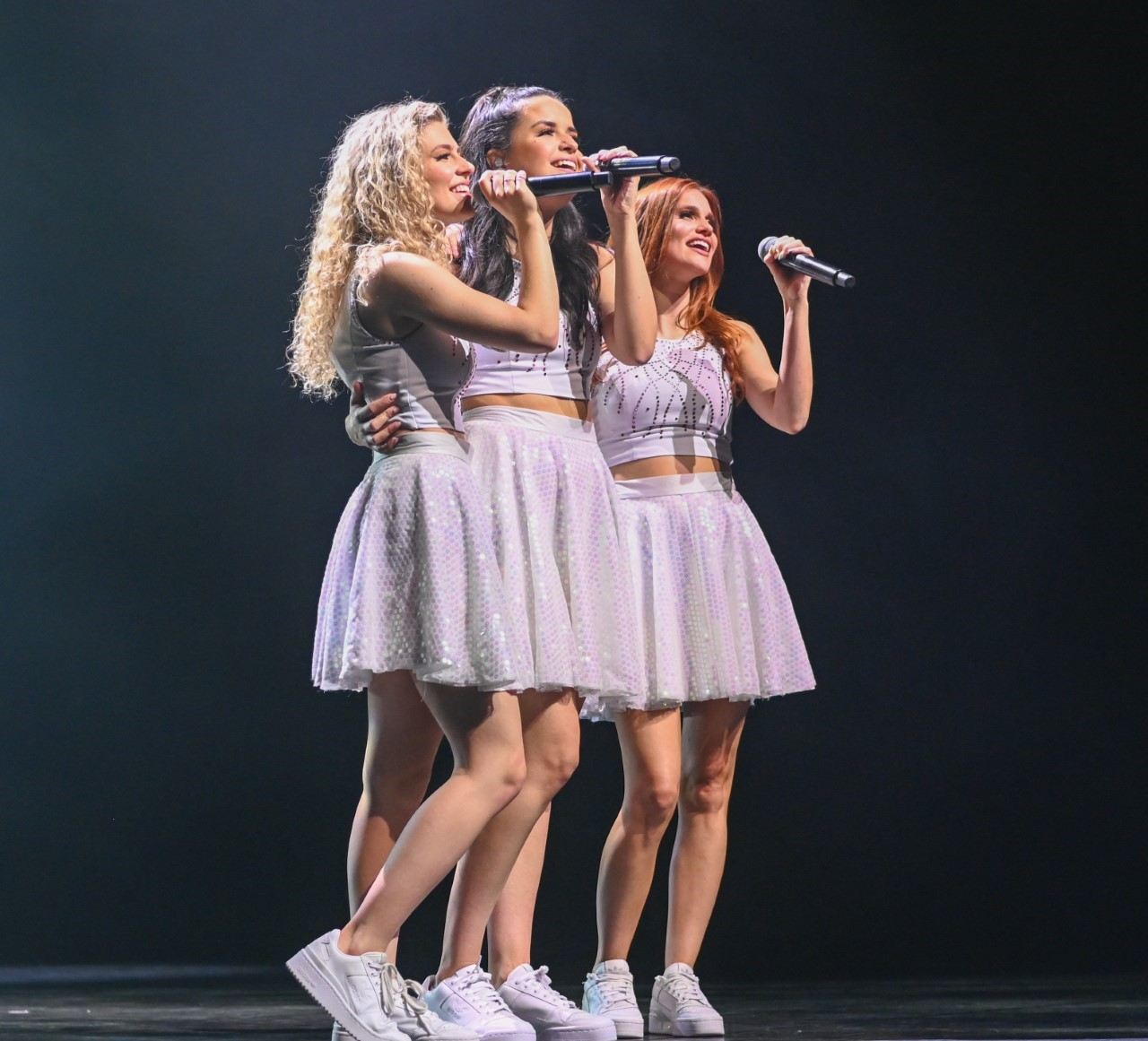
2021-

== Discography ==
Studio albums

- Parels (1999)
- Alle kleuren (2000)
- Tele-Romeo (2001)
- Verliefd (2002)
- Oya lélé (2003)
- De wereld rond (2004)
- Kuma hé (2005)
- Ya ya yippee (2006)
- Kusjes (2007)
- MaMaSé! (2009)
- Eyo! (2011)
- Engeltjes (2012)
- Loko le (2013)
- 10.000 Luchtballonnen (2015)
- Ushuaia (2016)
- Love Cruise (2017)
- Roller Disco (2018)
- Dromen (2019)
- Dans van de farao (2020)
- Waterval (2021)
- Vleugels (2022)
- Het lied van de zeemeermin (2024)
- Superheld (2026)

== Musicals ==
K3 has performed in several musicals. In Doornroosje (Sleeping Beauty), during 2002, they played three good fairies and in De 3 biggetjes (The Three Little Pigs) in 2003. They played the eponymous three pigs, Knirrie (Verbeke), Knarrie (Damen) and Knorrie (Aerts) and reprised these roles in 2007, now also having one location in The Netherlands.

In 2011, Damen, Verbeke and Huisman performed in the musical Alice In Wonderland. The musical is the first live musical to use 3D projections. The production toured Belgium and the Netherlands in 2011.

In June 2023, it was announced that K3 would play the musical De 3 Biggetjes for a third time in 2024. Now with De Pillecyn, Verbruggen and Boschman as Knirrie, Knarrie and Knorri. The renewed musical premiered in February 2024 and had a full tour of both Belgium and The Netherlands. On 24 April they won the audience award for best Family Musical in Dutch of 2024.

In 2026, the musical Sleeping Beauty was also brought back to life. Which be staged in the Studio 100 Theatre within Plopsaland de Panne. A new single was also added to the musical. Due to her second pregnancy, De Pillecyn shared her role as good fairy with old member Klaasje Meijer.

== Filmography ==
The members of K3 have also starred in several theatrical films and TV specials. They usually portray fictional versions of themselves, having all kind of adventures.

In 2004, they released their first theatrical movie, K3 en het Magische Medaillon (K3 and the magic medallion). The film premiered on 29 September 2004. In the film, Dutch television celebrity Paul de Leeuw played the genie.

In 2006, the second theatrical K3 movie, K3 en het IJsprinsesje (K3 and the little ice princess), was released. In this fairy tale film Carry Tefsen played the witch at the pancake house, Peter Faber played the king and famous Belgian comedian Urbanus played the wizard.

The third theatrical K3 movie, K3 en de Kattenprins (K3 and the Cat Prince) had its Dutch premiere on 20 December 2007.

On 12 December 2012 a fourth theatrical K3 movie, K3 Bengeltjes (K3 Rascal Angels), was released in Belgium and the Netherlands. This was the first K3 movie without Kathleen, Josje's predecessor. The movie is connected to their sitcom, Hallo K3! (Hello K3!), and stars some of the same actors and characters.

On 12 February 2014 a fifth theatrical K3 movie, K3 Dierenhotel (K3 Animal Hotel), was released in Belgium and the Netherlands. This is the second movie featuring Josje Huisman and also includes actors and characters from the sitcom.

On 9 December 2017 a sixth theatrical K3 movie, K3 Love Cruise, was released in Belgium and the Netherlands. It's the first movie of the new K3: Hanne, Klaasje and Marthe. Also this K3 movie features a few actors and characters from the sitcom, Hallo K3! (Hello K3!).

It was announced on 14 May 2020 that K3 will be filming the seventh K3 movie, K3 Dans van de Farao (K3 Dance of the Pharaoh). The original premiere was supposed to take place in December 2020, but it was postponed due to the corona measures. The movie finally premiered in the Netherlands on 5 June 2021 and in Belgium on 9 June 2021. It features the regular cast of their fiction series, K3 Roller Disco.

In April 2024 it was announced that the eighth K3 movie was on its way, K3 en Het Lied van de Zeemeermin (K3 and the Mermaid's song). Filming took place on Malta in September. It had its premiere on 15 December in Belgium and on 26 January in the Netherlands. It is the first with Julia Boschman and the first K3 film shot on an island.

Recordings of their musicals and concert shows are also available on DVD.

Movies
Year	Title	Translation	Remarks
2004	K3 en het Magische Medaillon	K3 and the magic medallion	
2006	K3 en het IJsprinsesje	K3 and the Little Ice Princess	
2006	Piet Piraat en het vliegende schip	Piet Pirate and the flying ship	Voices of the carnivorous plants
2007	K3 en de Kattenprins	K3 and the Catprince	
2012	K3 Bengeltjes	K3 Little Dangles	
2014	K3 Dierenhotel	K3 Animalhotel	
2017	K3 Love Cruise		
2020	K3 Dans van de Farao	K3 Dance of the Pharaoh	
2024	K3 en Het Lied van de Zeemeermin	K3 and the Mermaid's song	
Shows
Year	Title	Translation	Remarks
2000	De wereld van K3	The world of K3	
2001	Tele-Romeo Tour		
2002	Toveren Tour	Magic tour	
2003	K3 in Wonderland		
2004	K3 de wereld rond	K3 around the world	
2005, 2012	K3 in Ahoy	K3 in Ahoy	
2006	K3 en het Heksenexamen	K3 and the Witch's exam	
2008	K3 en het Toverhart	K3 and the magic heart	Last show with Kathleen
2009	MaMaSé!		
2010	K3 en de Wondermachine	K3 and the Wonder Machine	
2013	K3 Verjaardagsshow 15 jaar	K3 Birthday Show 15 years	
2014-2015	K3 Kan Het! Show	K3 can do it! Show	
2015-2016	Afscheidstour	Farewell tour	Show with the old and the new K3 together
2017	K3 in de ruimte	K3 in space	
2018	K3 Vlindershow	K3 Butterfly Show	
2019	20 jaar K3	20 years of K3	
2021	K3 Dromenshow	K3 Dream Show	The farewell of Klaasje Meijer
2022	Kom erbij!	Join us!	The entrance of Julia Boschman
2022-2023, 2025	K3 Live in Concert		
2023	Vleugels	Wings	
2023, 2025	K3 Live Late Night		
2025	Zeesterren	Starfish	
2025-2026	K3 Originals - De reünie	K3 Originals - The Reunion	Reunion
Musical
Year	Title	Translation	Remarks
2002, 2026	Doornroosje	Sleeping Beauty	As the Three Good Fairies
2003, 2007, 2024	De 3 Biggetjes	The three piglets	As The Three Little Pigs
2011	Alice in Wonderland		
Television
Year	Title	Translation	Remarks
2000, 2002	Samson en Gert	Samson and Gert	Episode 'K3 op bezoek' and 'K3 komt niet'
2003-2009 2010-2013	De wereld van K3	The world of K3	
2009, 2021	K2 Zoekt K3	K2 searching for K3	Search of the successor of Kathleen Aerts (2009) and Klaasje Meijer (2021)
2010-2012	Hallo K3!	Hello K3!	Comedy series
2014-2015	K3 Kan Het!	K3 can do it!	Wish series
2015	K3 Zoekt K3	K3 searching for K3	Search of the new K3
2015-	K3 - Muziekclips	K3 - Music clips	
2015	Dit is K3!	This is K3!	Reality series
2016	Wij zijn K3!	We are K3!	Documentary series
2016	De Avonturen van K3	The Adventures of K3	Animated series
2016-2017	Iedereen K3	Everyone K3	
2016-2017	K3 Dansstudio	K3 Dance Studio	
2017-	K3 Vlogt	K3 Vlogs	
2018	De tafel van K3	The table of K3	
2018- 2022	The Voice Kids (Flemish)		As judges/coaches
2018-2020	K3 Roller Disco		Fiction series
2019	K3 Dromen	K3 Dreams	Puppetry series
2020	K3 Roller Disco Club		Spin-off of the fiction series
2021	K3, een nieuw begin	K3, a new begin	Reality series
2022	K3, een nieuwe start	K3, a new start	Documentary series
2022	K3 Vriendenboek	K3 Friendship book	Wish series
2022	K3, één jaar later	K3, one year later	K3 looks back on the first year with Julia
2023-2024	The Best Singers (Liefde voor muziek, België)	Love for Music, Belgium	As participating artists
2023	Team K3		Documentary series
2025	K3 Originals: Het verhaal van Karen, Kristel en Kathleen	K3 Originals: The story of Karen, Kristel and Kathleen	Documentary series
2025	The Masked Singer		As guest panelists
Specials
Year	Title	Translation	Remarks
2002	K3 in Zwitserland	K3 in Switzerland	
2003	K3 in de Ardennen	K3 in the Ardennes	
2006	K3 in de sneeuw	K3 in the snow	
2010	K3 en het wensspel	K3 and the wish game	
2011	K3 en het droombed	K3 and the dream bed	
2012	K3 Modemeiden	K3 Fashion girls	
2014	K3 in Nederland	K3 in the Netherlands	
2015-2016	Welkom bij K3!	Welcome to K3!	
2016	Het dagboek van K3 2016	The diary of K3 2016	
2017	Overal K3	Everywhere K3	
2017	Het dagboek van K3 2017	The diary of K3 2017	
2018	Het dagboek van K3 2018	The diary of K3 2018	K3 looks back on the third year in 2018
2020	Just Dance 2020		With the single '10.000 luchtballonnen'
2021	Just Dance 2021		With the single 'Dans van de farao'
2021	K2 zoekt mee	K2 searches along	
2022	Just Dance 2022		With the single 'Waterval'
2023	Just Dance 2023		With the single 'Vleugels'
2023	Een terugblik op 25 jaar K3	A look back at 25 years of K3	
