= 10.000 luchtballonnen =

Studio album by K3
- Released: 18 December 2015
- Recorded: 2015
- Genre: Pop
- Length: 40:02
- Label: Studio 100
- Producers: Miguel Wiels; Peter Gillis

K3 chronology
Loko le (2013)	10.000 luchtballonnen (2015)	Ushuaia (2016)

Singles from 10.000 luchtballonnen
- 1. "10.000 luchtballonnen" Released: 13 November 2015; 2. "Jodelee" Released: 5 February 2016

10.000 luchtballonnen is the fourteenth studio album by Belgian-Dutch girl group K3. It is the first album that was recorded by Hanne Verbruggen, Klaasje Meijer and Marthe De Pillecyn, the new formation of K3, which was formed in the 2015 television audition show K3 zoekt K3. The album was released on 18 December 2015 by Studio 100. The album features twelve completely new songs, as well as twelve consisting K3-songs re-recorded by the new members. The album became a big success, especially in Belgium where it debuted at number one on the Belgian Album Top 200 and was certified 8× Platinum by the Belgian Entertainment Association, but also in The Netherlands where it reached the second position on the Dutch Album Top 100 and was certified Platinum by the NVPI. The first single, also called "10.000 luchtballonnen", was released after the finale of the television audition show, and debuted at number one at the Ultratop 50.

The single 10.000 luchtballonnen became part of Just Dance 2020, making it the second Dutch-language song in the franchise and the first one included in the base game (though it is only available in the Benelux region).

== Track listing ==
10.000 luchtballonnen – Standard edition disc 1
No.	Title	Writer(s)	Producer(s)	Length
1.	"10.000 luchtballonnen"	Miguel Wiels; Peter Gillis; Alain Vande Putte	Wiels; Gillis	3:39
2.	"Kusjessoldaten"	Wiels; Gillis; Vande Putte	Wiels; Gillis	3:40
3.	"Als het binnenregent"	Wiels; Gillis; Vande Putte	Wiels; Gillis	3:17
4.	"Jodelee"	Wiels; Gillis; Vande Putte	Wiels; Gillis	3:17
5.	"Kus van de juf"	Wiels; Gillis; Vande Putte	Wiels; Gillis	2:55
6.	"Jij bent de bom!"	Wiels; Gillis; Vande Putte	Wiels; Gillis	3:19
7.	"Rettettet"	Wiels; Gillis; Vande Putte	Wiels; Gillis	3:37
8.	"Lila Liedjesland"	Wiels; Gillis; Vande Putte	Wiels; Gillis	3:35
9.	"Woef!"	Wiels; Gillis; Vande Putte	Wiels; Gillis	2:59
10.	"Do Do Do You Love Me"	Wiels; Gillis; Vande Putte	Wiels; Gillis	2:59
11.	"Mami Bisou"	Wiels; Gillis; Vande Putte	Wiels; Gillis	3:36
12.	"Meisjesdag"	Wiels; Gillis; Vande Putte	Wiels; Gillis	3:09
Total length:				40:02

10.000 luchtballonnen – Standard edition disc 2
No.	Title	Writer(s)	Length
1.	"Alle kleuren"	Wiels; Gillis; Vande Putte	3:32
2.	"Tele-Romeo"	Wiels; Gillis; Vande Putte	3:18
3.	"Heyah mama"	Wiels; Gillis; Vande Putte	3:19
4.	"Oma’s aan de top"	Wiels; Gillis; Vande Putte	3:22
5.	"Oya lélé"	Wiels; Gillis; Vande Putte	3:45
6.	"Verliefd"	Wiels; Gillis; Vande Putte	3:35
7.	"Eyo!"	Wiels; Gillis; Tracy Atkins	3:28
8.	"Ya ya yippee"	Wiels; Gillis; Vande Putte	3:35
9.	"Toveren"	Danny Verbiest; Gert Verhulst; Hans Bourlon; Johan Vanden Eede; Wiels; Gillis	3:21
10.	"Kuma hé"	Wiels; Gillis; Vande Putte	3:27
11.	"Handjes draaien"	Wiels; Gillis; Vande Putte	3:16
12.	"MaMasé!"	Wiels; Gillis; Vande Putte	3:47
Total length:			41:48

== Charts and certifications ==
=== Weekly charts ===
Chart (2015–16)	Peak position
Belgian Albums (Ultratop Flanders)	1
Belgian Albums (Ultratop Wallonia)	188
Dutch Albums (Album Top 100)	2

=== Year-end charts ===
Chart (2016)	Position
Belgian Albums (Ultratop Flanders)	1
Dutch Albums (Album Top 100)	12
Chart (2019)	Position
Belgian Albums (Ultratop Flanders)	91
Chart (2021)	Position
Belgian Albums (Ultratop Flanders)	179

=== Certifications ===
Region	Certification	Certified units/sales
Belgium (BRMA)	8× Platinum	160,000^{*}
Netherlands (NVPI)	Platinum	40,000^{^}
^{*} Sales figures based on certification alone.^{^} Shipments figures based on certification alone.
