= Ushuaia (album) =

Studio album by K3
- Released: 10 November 2016
- Recorded: 2016
- Genre: Pop
- Length: 46:40
- Label: Studio 100
- Producer: Studio 100

K3 chronology
10.000 luchtballonnen (2015)	Ushuaia (2016)	Love Cruise (2017)

Singles from Ushuaia
- 1. "De Wereld van K3(The World of K3)" Released: 25 March 2016; 2. "Ushuaia" Released: 3 June 2016; 3. "Iedereen K3(Everyone K3)" Released: 12 August 2016; 4. "Love Boat Baby" Released: 21 October 2016

Ushuaia is the fifteenth studio album by the Belgian-Dutch girl group K3. It is the second album with the new formation of K3, which was formed in the 2015 television show K3 zoekt K3 (K3 searches for K3). The album was scheduled for release on 10 November 2016 by Studio 100. The album features thirteen new songs and twelve existing K3-songs re-recorded by the new members.

Three singles were released to promote the album. The lead single, "Ushuaia", was released on 3 June 2016. "Iedereen K3 (Everyone K3)" was released on 12 August 2016.

The cover of the album attracted much attention, due to the face of Marthe De Pillecyn. In the first pictures that came out, the image was heavily photoshopped.

== Track listing ==
All tracks are written by Miguel Wiels, Peter Gilles, Alain Vande Putte.

Ushuaia – Standard edition disc 1
No.	Title	Length
1.	"Ushuaia"	3:40
2.	"Love Boat Baby"	3:01
3.	"De Aarde Beeft" (The Earth is Shaking)	3:17
4.	"Aliyee"	3:20
5.	"Iedereen K3" (Everyone K3)	3:20
6.	"On Va Danser"	3:16
7.	"Play-o"	2:54
8.	"Boembiboem"	3:09
9.	"Choco Choco"	3:18
10.	"Popgroep" (Pop group)	3:44
11.	"Helden en Soldaten" (Heroes and Soldiers)	3:23
12.	"Prinsesje en Superman" (Princess and Superman)	3:19
Total length:		39:30

Ushuaia – Standard edition disc 2
No.	Title	Length
1.	"Liefdeskapitein" (Captain of Love)	3:35
2.	"Hallo K3" (Hello K3)	2:46
3.	"I Love You Baby"	3:41
4.	"Waar Zijn Die Engeltjes?" (Where Are The Angels?)	3:30
5.	"Je Hebt Een Vriend" (You Have A Friend)	3:14
6.	"Loko Le"	3:29
7.	"De 3 Biggetjes" (The Three Piglets)	3:23
8.	"Drums Gaan Boem" (Drums Go Boom!)	3:00
9.	"Bij De Politie" (With The Police)	3:21
10.	"Hippie Shake"	2:32
11.	"Lollypopland" (Country of Lollypops)	3:48
12.	"De Wereld van K3" (The World of K3)	3:07
Total length:		39:20

== Charts ==
=== Weekly charts ===
Chart (2016)	Peak position
Belgian Albums (Ultratop Flanders)	1
Dutch Albums (Album Top 100)	3

=== Year-end charts ===
Chart (2016)	Position
Belgian Albums (Ultratop Flanders)	5
Dutch Albums (MegaCharts)	32
Chart (2017)	Position
Belgian Albums (Ultratop Flanders)	15
Dutch Albums (MegaCharts)	44
Chart (2019)	Position
Belgian Albums (Ultratop Flanders)	176

== Certifications ==
Region	Certification	Certified units/sales
Belgium (BRMA)	4× Platinum	80,000^{*}
^{*} Sales figures based on certification alone.
