= Kathleen Aerts =

Belgian singer, actress and host (born 1978)

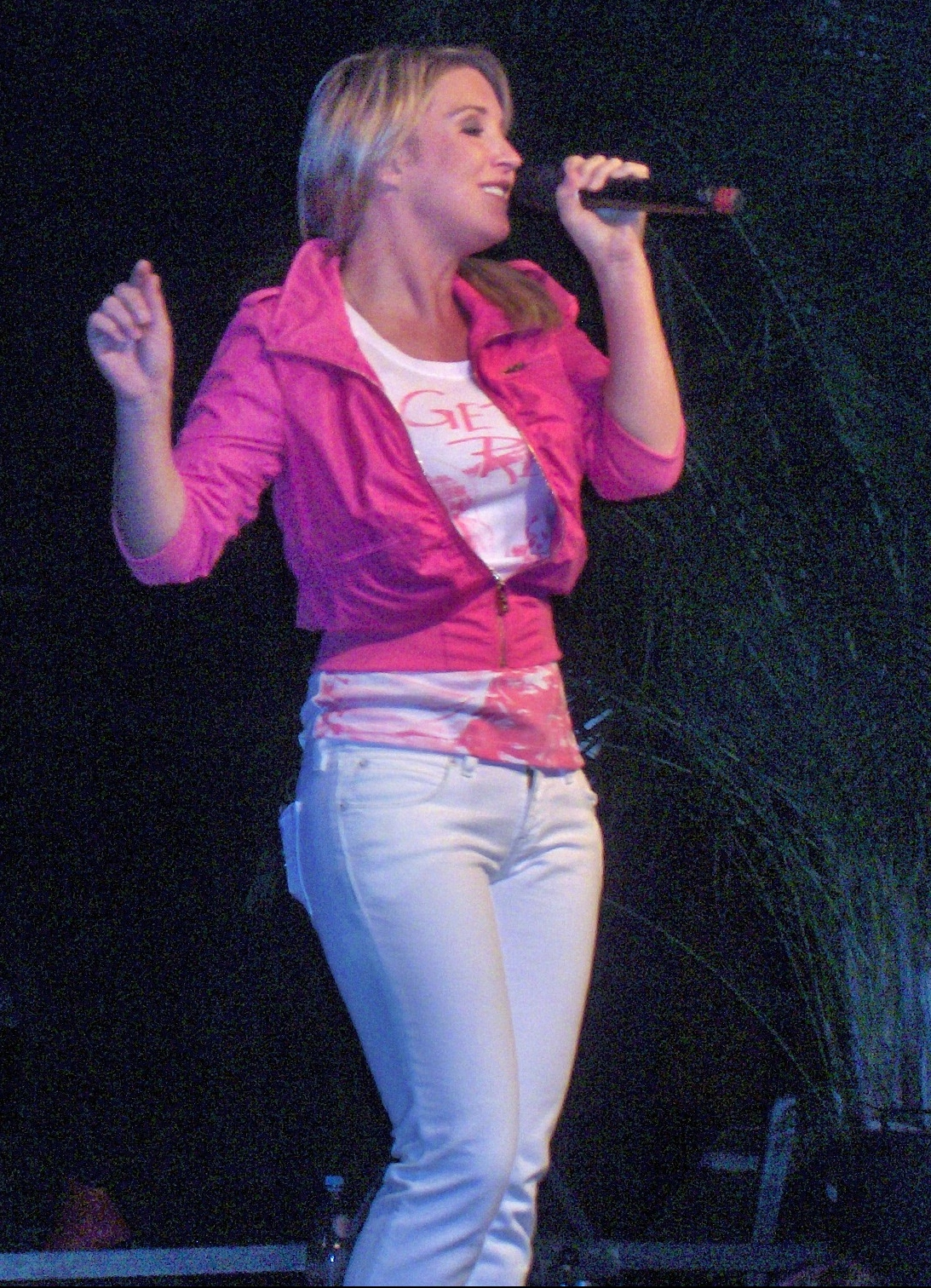
- Aerts performing in 2010

Background information
- Born: Kathelijne Elisabeth Maria Aerts; 18 June 1978 (age 48); Geel, Belgium
- Genres: Pop
- Occupations: Singer, actress, host, musicalactress
- Instruments: Vocals
- Years active: 1998–present
- Labels: Studio 100, Sony BMG (with K3)
- Formerly of: K3
- Spouse(s): Steven van Hoof, police officer

Kathleen Aerts (born June 18, 1978, in Geel, Belgium) is a Belgian singer, actress, and host. She was a member of the successful girl group K3.

== Early life ==
Aerts was born in Geel, Belgium, on 18 June 1978. She has been involved in singing and music since a young age. Between 1992 and 1995 she gained experience as a member of the group Wonderful Game and became known for her two participations in the Flemish version of the Soundmixshow: in 1995 she came third with the song Grow A Baby by the Belgian pop group Pop In Wonderland and in 1997 she made it to the semifinals with Chirpy chirpy cheep cheep by Middle of the Road.

== Career ==
From 1998 to 2009, Aerts was a member of the successful girl group K3. Originally thought as the Flemish version of the Spice Girls, the group eventually became famous for their songs for children. Because K3 was originally envisioned as the Flemish version of the Spice Girls, the group was made up of all females in their twenties: Aerts, Karen Damen, and Kristel Verbeke.

K3 achieved success after the release of "Heyah Mama", and in 2002 their manager sold the band to Studio 100. The production company made the group an even bigger success, with merchandising, film, TV series and books also being released.

In 2009, Aerts decided to stop being a member of K3 and to start her solo career. Her first song, titled "Zumba Yade", was made in cooperation with Unicef. The single reached the top 3 of the Dutch Single Top 100 in July 2009 and the top 20 of the Ultratop 50 in Flanders. She sold more than 10,000 CDs in Belgium and the Netherlands. In November 2009, Aerts released her debut solo album Kathleen in symfonie. The album contained twelve songs, including a duet with Danny de Munk. Aerts ensured that part of the proceedings from the album went to Unicef. This decision ensued from her experience in South Africa.

In 2010, she became a member of the KetnetBand. The same year she also decided to go back to children's music, releasing a song titled "Boerderij blues" (en. Farm blues). She released three other songs for children. In 2007 a wax figure of Kathleen Aerts was unveiled in the Madame Tussauds in Amsterdam together with those of the other two original K3 members.

In 2016, Aerts released "Die roos", an adaptation of Ann Christy's hit "De roos", her first single in Afrikaans. A year later, she recorded the single "Afrika", also in Afrikaans, which was also part of the soundtrack of the film F.C. De Kampioenen 3: Forever (2007). In September 2017, she published her third book: Lilly en Max in de wereld van oma.

In 2020, Aerts participated as Mermaid in the television show The Masked Singer, in which judges must guess the identity of the masked participant. Here she was reunited after a long time with Karen Damen, who sat on the jury of the program and correctly guessed the masked mermaid was Aerts.

== Personal life ==
Kathleen Aerts married Steven van Hoof, a police officer, in 2010. Their first child, a boy, was born on 26 January 2011. Their second boy was born in December 2013. In 2015, she moved with her husband, sons and mother to Paarl, South Africa.

== Books ==
- 2009: Mijn leven als K1 (Author: Kathleen Aerts, ISBN 978-94-6099-000-7, published by Kwagga in Dutch)
- 2015: Voor altijd mijn mama. Leven met jongdementie (Author: Kathleen Aerts, ISBN 978-94-0142-877-4, published by Lannoo in Dutch)
- 2017: Lilly en Max in de wereld van Oma (Author: Kathleen Aerts, ISBN 978-94-0144-489-7, published by Lannoo in Dutch)

== Musicals ==
- 1998: Sneeuwwitje (as Sneeuwwitje, en. "Snow White")
- 2002: Doornroosje (as one of the good "fairies", en. Sleeping Beauty)
- 2003: De drie biggetjes (as Knorri, one of the "Three little pigs")
- 2005: De kleine zeemeermin (as The "Little Mermaid")
- 2007: De drie biggetjes (as Knorri, one of the "Three little pigs")

== Films ==
Film
Year	Film	Role	Notes
2002	K3 in Zwitserland	Kathleen, main role	
2003	K3 in de Ardennen	Kathleen, main role	
2004	K3 en het Magische Medaillon	Kathleen, main role	First K3 theater movie
2006	K3 en het Ijsprinsesje	kathleen, main role	
2006	Piet Piraat en het Vliegende Schip	The Yellow Flesh-eating Plant	Voice only
2007	K3 en de Kattenprins	Kathleen, main role	
2007	K3 in de sneeuw	Kathleen, main role	
2012	Sint & Diego en de magische bron van Myra	Mother, supporting role	
Television
Year	Title	Role	Notes
1999	Euosong 1999	Herself, candidate	Casting show
2000	Samson & Gert	Herself, guest appearance	"K3 Komt Op Bezoek"
2000–2005	Top of the Pops NL	Herself, 9 episodes	
2002	Samson & Gert	Herself, guest appearance	"K3 Komt Niet"
2003–2009	De Wereld van K3	Herself, host	Talkshow
2009–2010	Ranking the stars	Herself	8 episodes
2009	K2 zoekt K3	Herself, guest appearance	Casting show
2009	Hit the road	Herself, guest appearance	3 episodes
2009	Junior Eurosong 2009	Herself, judge	Casting show
2010	My name is...	Herself, judge	Talent show
2012	Junior Eurosong 2012	Herself, vocal coach	Casting show
2013	Vlaanderen muziekland	Herself	
2013	Op stap met Dirk Scheele	Herself	

== Discography ==
=== Singles ===
Year	Title	BE	NL	Notes
2009	Zumba Yade	11	3	together with Soweto Gospel Choir, Sold: 10.000+
2012	De sinterklaas polonaise	14	–	
2012	Feest voor iedereen	–	59	feat. Diego Piet
2013	Hey Chickie	15	–	
2013	Vliegen	17	–	
2013	Juffrouw	53	–	
2016	De Roos	–	–	
2017	Afrika	–	–	

=== Albums ===
Year	Title	BE	NL	Notes
2009	Kathleen in symfonie	21	–	
2012	Dag Sinterklaasje	14	53	
2013	Vlinders	24	–	

== Sources ==
- Chart Stats: K3, Ultratop (in Dutch)
- Chart Stats: K3, Dutch Charts (in Dutch)
- Kathleen Aerts gelukkiger dan ooit nu ze K3 heeft verlaten, Het Nieuwsblad (in Dutch)
- Ex-K3 Kathleen trouwt, Gazet van Antwerpen (in Dutch)
- AMSTERDAM - Voormalig K3-zangeres Kathleen Aerts wil voor kinderen blijven zingen. "Dat K3-verleden wis je niet zomaar uit. Afgelopen zomer heb ik veel opgetreden en het was duidelijk dat kinderen mij nog steeds in hun hart sluiten.", NU.nl (in Dutch)
