= Story (Eric Clapton album) =

Compilation album by Eric Clapton
- Released: 1991
- Recorded: 1967–1979
- Genre: Blues rock
- Length: 77:57
- Label: Polydor

Story is a compilation album by Eric Clapton.

== Track listing ==
1. "Cocaine" - 3:35 (from Slowhand, 1977)
2. "Lay Down Sally" - 3:50 (from Slowhand)
3. "Wonderful Tonight" - 3:39 (from Slowhand)
4. "Crossroads" (Live) - 4:12 (from Wheels of Fire, 1968)
5. "After Midnight" - 3:08 (from Eric Clapton, 1970)
6. "I Shot the Sheriff" - 4:22 (from 461 Ocean Boulevard, 1974)
7. "Further Up the Road" (Live) - 7:31 (from Just One Night, 1980)
8. "Rambling On My Mind" (Live) - 7:23 (from E. C. Was Here, 1975)
9. "Layla" - 7:11 (from Layla and Other Assorted Love Songs, 1970)
10. "Next Time You See Her" - 3:59 (from Slowhand, 1977)
11. "Knockin' on Heaven's Door" - 4:21 (Non-album single, 1975)
12. "Sunshine of Your Love" - 4:11 (from Disraeli Gears, 1967)
13. "Tulsa Time" (Live) - 4:01 (from Just One Night)
14. "Let It Grow" - 4:58 (from 461 Ocean Boulevard)
15. "Steady Rollin' Man" - 3:12 (from 461 Ocean Boulevard)
16. "Have You Ever Loved a Woman?" (Live) - 7:50 (from E. C. Was Here)

== Chart performance ==
=== Weekly charts ===
| Chart (1990–91) | Peak position |
|---|---|
| Austrian Albums (Ö3 Austria) | 24 |
| Dutch Albums (Album Top 100) | 8 |
| European Albums (IFPI) | 28 |
| Finnish Albums (Suomen virallinen lista) | 3 |
| French Compilation Albums (IFOP) | 9 |
| German Albums (Offizielle Top 100) | 17 |
| Italian Albums (AFI) | 7 |

== Certifications ==
| Region | Certification | Certified units/sales |
|---|---|---|
| Finland (Musiikkituottajat) | Gold | 25,000 |
| France (SNEP) | Gold | 100,000^{*} |
| Netherlands (NVPI) | Platinum | 100,000^{^} |
| Switzerland (IFPI Switzerland) | Gold | 25,000^{^} |
| United Kingdom (BPI) | Gold | 100,000^{^} |
^{*} Sales figures based on certification alone.^{^} Shipments figures based on certification alone.
