= Gert Verhulst =

Belgian actor and film director

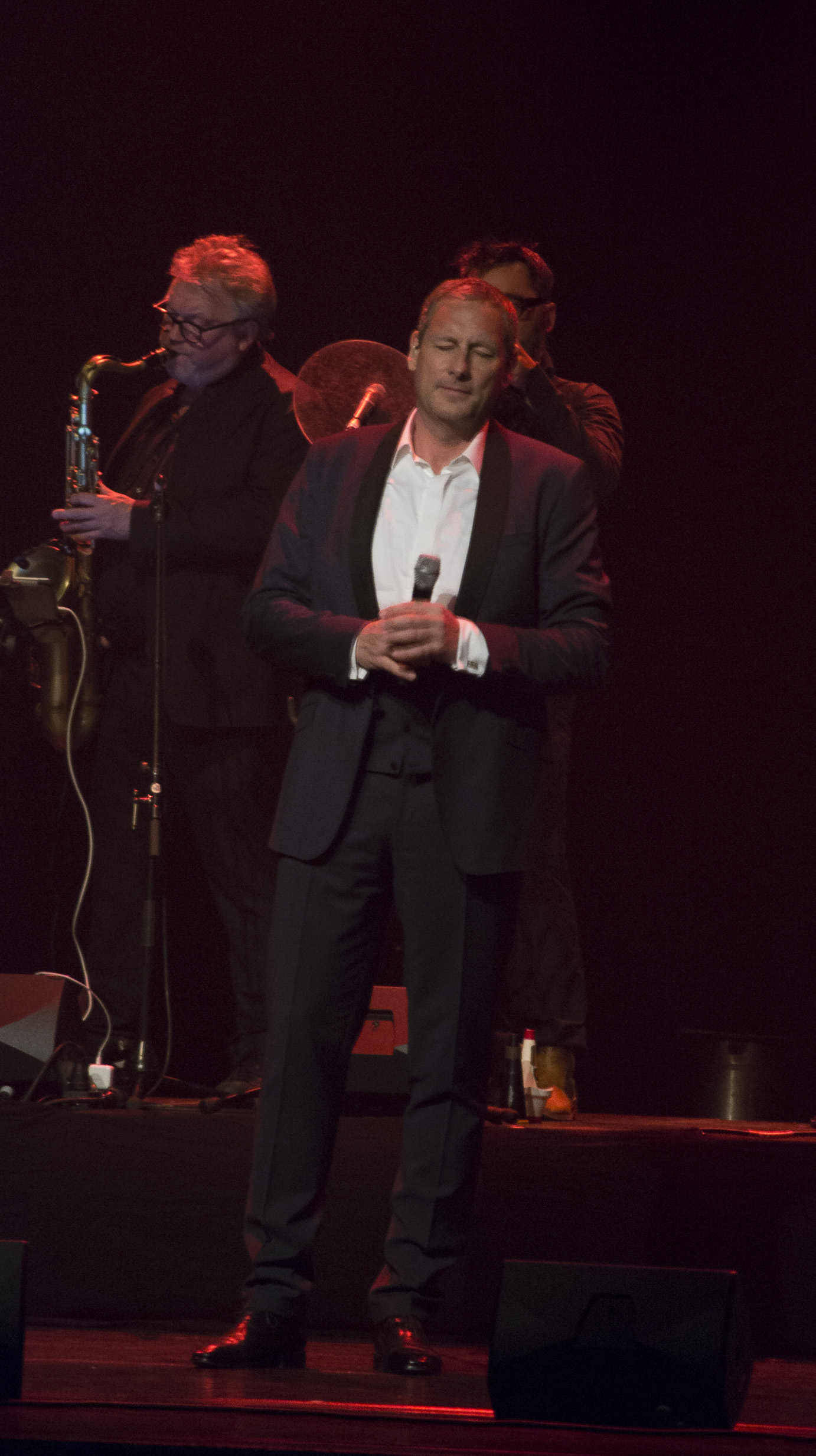
- Verhulst in 2017
- Born: Gert Tony Hubert Verhulst; 24 January 1968 (age 58); Berchem, Belgium
- Education: autodidact, Refused at the Antwerp Academy of fine Arts.
- Occupations: Managing director of studio 100 (1996–present) presenter, entrepreneur, singer, director, actor, business magnate.
- Years active: 1987–present
- Awards: Gouden Pier Kloeffe, Manager of the year by Trends
- Website: studio100.tv

Gert Tony Hubert Verhulst (born 24 January 1968 in Berchem, Antwerp) is a Belgian presenter, entrepreneur, singer, director, actor, screenwriter, composer, film producer, and business magnate. As a prominent figure within the children's entertainment industry in the Benelux, he is regarded as a Flemish cultural icon, known for his influence and contributions to children's entertainment in the Benelux and founder of Studio 100.

== Life and career ==
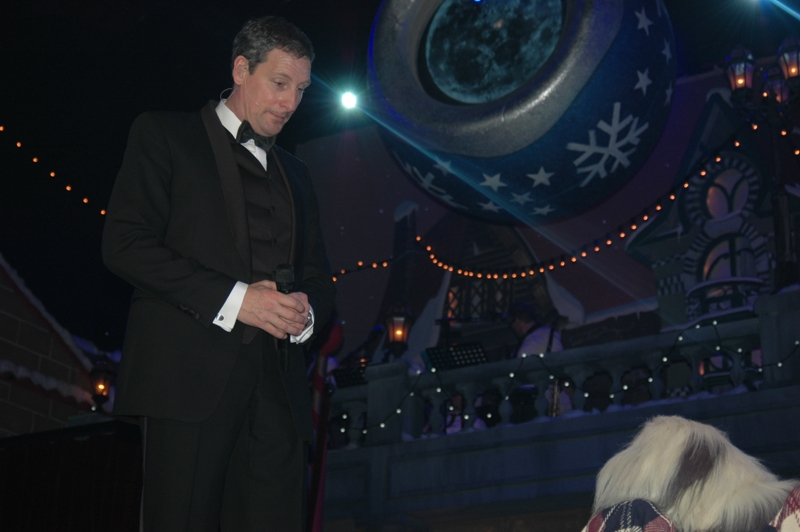
The Samson and Gert Christmas show 2009

Verhulst claims he knew at very early age that he wanted to become famous. In 1987 he applied at the Royal Conservatoire Antwerp where he was rejected, he would recall this as a gift from Heaven. Later that year he got his first job at the former BRTN (now VRT) as continuity announcer.

=== Samson en Gert ===
Samson & Gert is a Flemish children's television series produced by Eline van Noppen, centered on the talking dog Samson and his owner Gert. In its entire run, the show was originally aired on TV1 from Christmas Day 1989 until 1 December 1997, where it moved to Ketnet and continues airing all of its episodes to this day. As a continuity announcer Verhulst wanted to make the announcements before children's television programmes more appealing by having an animal puppet next to him. He got in touch with puppeteer Danny Verbiest, who created the puppet dog Samson. Samson, an Old English Sheepdog, made his screen debut on 2 September 1989. The pair's popularity grew very rapidly in Flanders and they were given their own television series in 1990. The show, named Samson, premiered on 2 September 1990. During the show, Samson and Gert and their friends would encounter many funny and chaotic situations. The plot would be interrupted for contests, fan mail and a variety of cartoons, such as The Smurfs, Ovide and the Gang, and Mrs. Pepper Pot.

=== Zeg eens Euh! ===
Verhulst presented the language game Zeg eens euh! (translated: Say Uh!) It was a game that was broadcast on Friday between 1992 and 1997 and whose concept was clearly inspired by the British radio game, Just a Minute. The panelists alternately were given a theme that they had to talk about for one minute. Together with the theme they got a banned word that they could not use. In the panel were four Flemish celebrities including: Emiel Goelen, Margriet Hermans, Koen Crucke and Jaak Pijpen. Occasionally one of these panelists was replaced by Mark Tijsmans, Andrea Croonenberghs, Walter Baele and Paul Ambach. During the summer months, the viewer share rose from 700,000 to 800,000 viewers. When Verhulst moved to Vtm, Donaat Deriemaecker took over the game but after a scandal involving one of the panel members, Emiel Goelen, the show was dismissed.

=== Move to VTM ===
In 1997 Verhulst moved to Vtm where he presented Wat zegt u? (translated: What do you say ?). This was followed by Linx and in the summer of 1998 Verhulst presented Sterrenslag (translated: Star battle) for several weeks because presenter Herbert Bruynseels had to withdraw due to illness. In the summer of 1999, the dialect game Watte? (translated What?) started with the panel members: Walter De Donder, Koen Crucke and Simonne Peeters.

=== Studio 100 ===
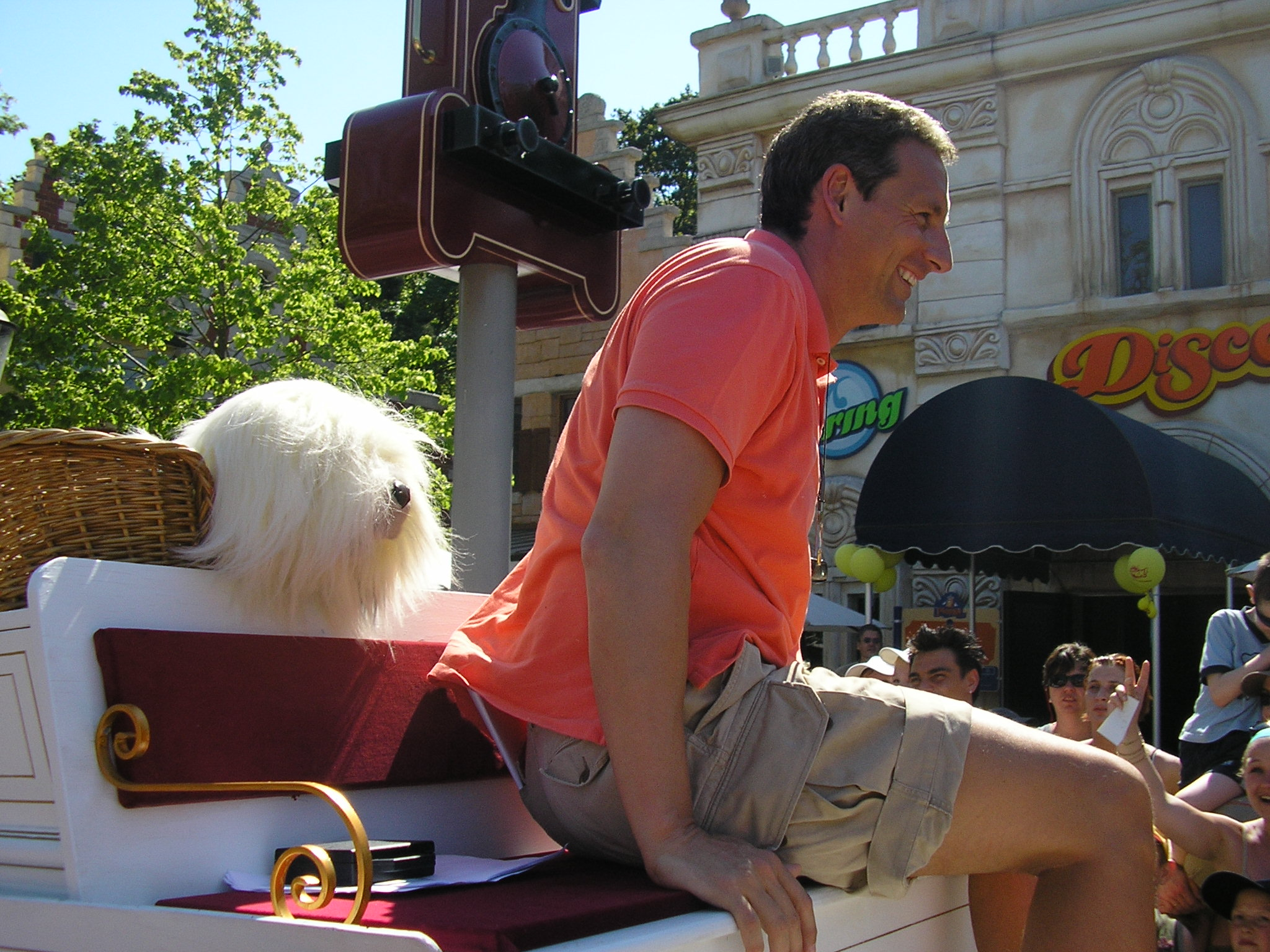
Verhulst and Samson at the Plopsa themepark

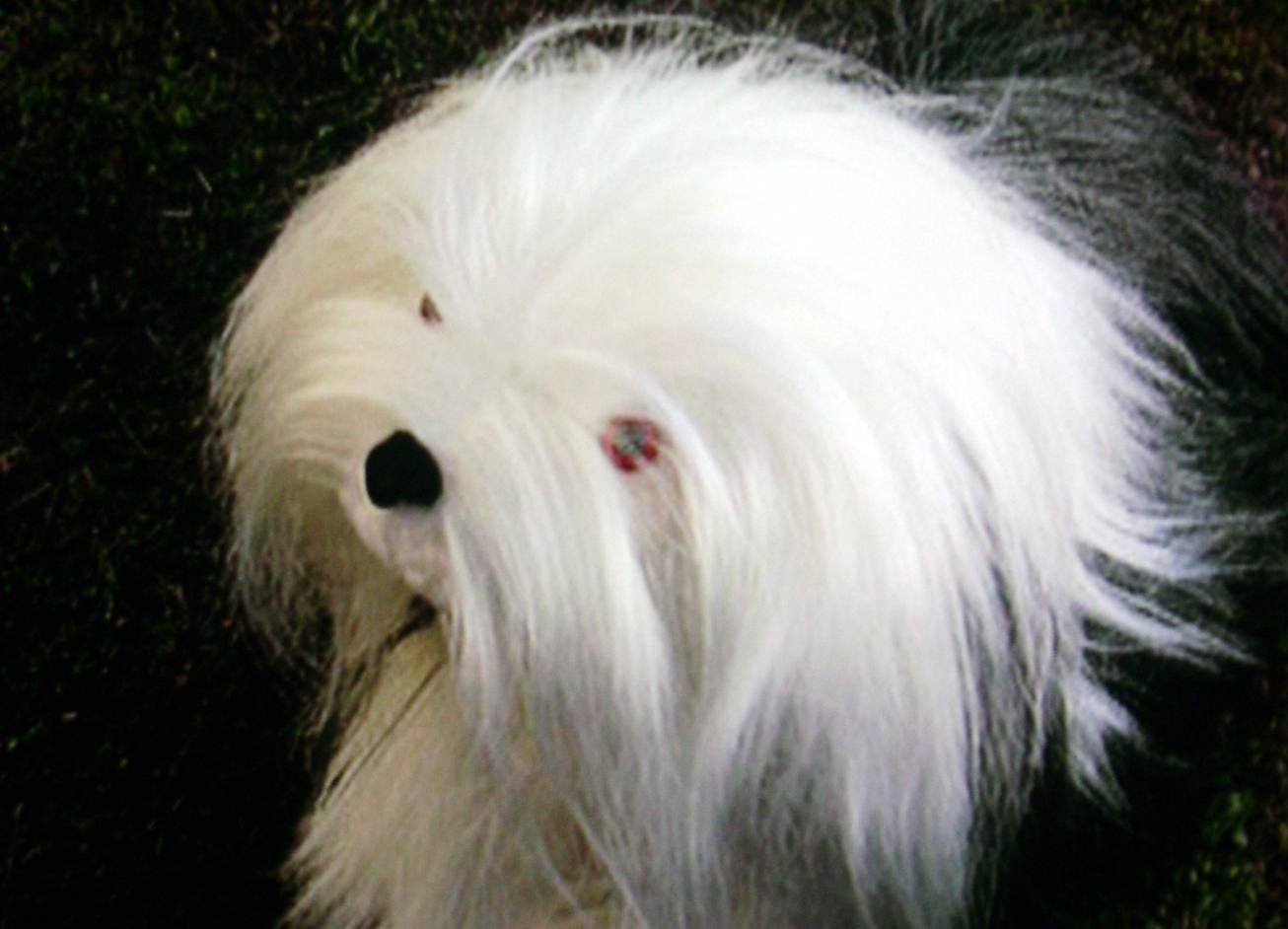
Samson

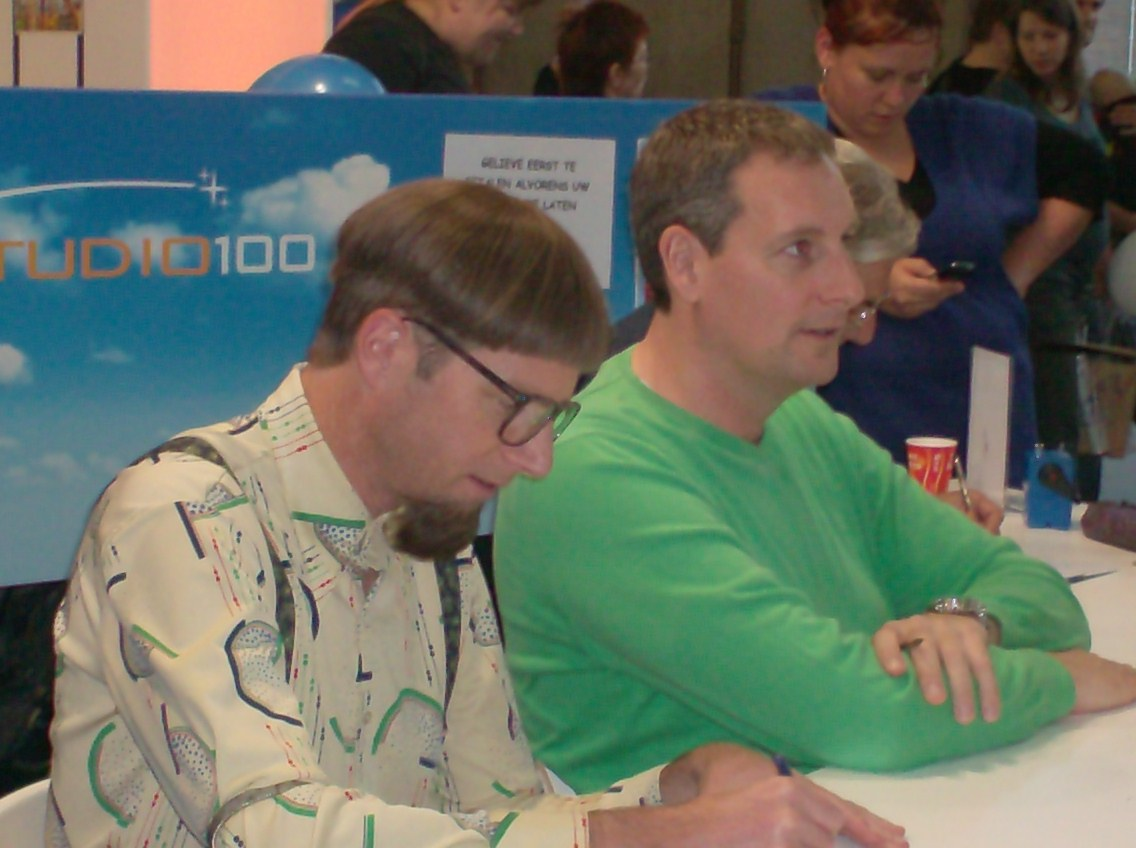
Verhulst and Walter Baele at the Book Fair 2009 in Antwerp

Verhulst founded Studio 100 in 1996 together with Danny Verbiest, and Hans Bourlon. They came together in 1989, when the programme Samson en Gert (translated Samson and Gert) was first produced. Studio 100 started in 1996 with one program Samson en Gert. They immediately decided to create a new program to be able to advertise themselves more. They chose Kabouter Plop (translated Gnome Plop). It has been broadcast on VTM since 1997. In 1999, Studio 100 expanded significantly with four new projects, all launched in Flanders: a musical, a film, and two new television programmes. For both the musical and the film, Vtm was asked to provide financial support. In October of '99, Studio 100 and the VMMa (Vlaamse Media Maatschappij, founded in 1987 as Vlaamse Televisie Maatschappij by nine publishers each with an 11.1% share), announced that they would incorporate Meli Park. Right now Studio 100 features Amusement parks in Belgium Plopsaland, Mayaland Indoor Plopsa Indoor, Plopsa Indoor Hasselt, Plopsa Coo and Plopsaqua, Plopsa Indoor Coevorden, Netherlands and Holiday Park in Germany The headquarters of Studio 100 are located in Schelle. Studio 100 has access to the largest recording studios in all of Belgium. Frequently, big events are hosted there, such as the preselections for the Eurovision Song Contest. The Dutch department of Studio 100 resides in the Mediapark in Hilversum. They also operate animation studios in Paris, Sydney & Munich, 2 TV stations. Studio 100 bought Flying Bark Productions, so they could create Master Raindrop and is continuously doing business with more than 160 broadcasters on average, operate on a regular base in 110 territories worldwide through selling TV, video on demand and home video licenses. For example, Maya the Bee has been sold to broadcasters covering even more than 150 countries.

=== Personal life ===
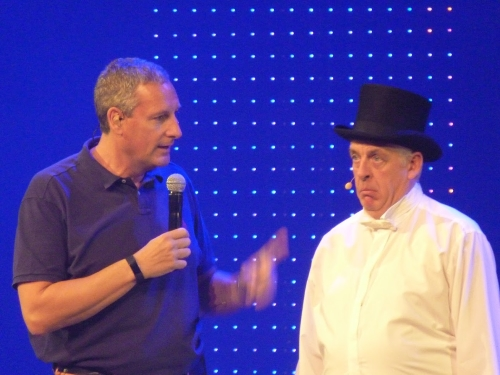
Verhulst and the mayor (Walter De Donder) in a Samson en Gert-show in Plopsaland (summer 2017)

In 1998 he married Valerie Calliau with whom he had a son (Victor Verhulst, 1993) and a daughter Marie Verhulst, 1995), before splitting up in 2003. His daughter, Marie Verhulst, is also an actress. At the time of the musical "Sleeping Beauty" there were rumours that Verhulst was in a relationship with Karen Damen from the popular girl group, K3. Verhulst always denied the relationship, but in February 2005, pictures of the couple appeared in a Dutch newspaper. In April the couple broke up, after a relationship of four years. From 2008 to 2011, Verhulst had a relationship with Ellen Callebout, a restaurant owner from Blankenberge. In 2012 Verhulst had a very short relationship with Josje Huisman, also a singer from K3, but after a few months they split up. Since then, he has gotten back together with Callebout and the couple married in 2019.

In 1999, Verhulst bought an institution for poor children "Villa Zonnelicht" ("villa sunlight") in Kapellen, Belgium for BF7.100.000 or €176,000 and made it his private home.

== Discography ==
=== Albums ===
- "Samson & Gert 1" 1991
- "Samson & Gert 2" 1992
- "Samson & Gert 3" 1993
- "Samson & Gert 4" 1995
- "Samson & Gert 5" 1995
- "Samson & Gert 6" 1996
- "Samson & Gert 7" 1997
- "Samson & Gert 8" 1998
- "Samson & Gert 9" 1999
- "Samson & Gert 10 – Het beste uit 10 jaar Samson en Gert" 2000
- "Samson & Gert 11 – De wereld is mooi" 2001
- "Samson & Gert 12 – Oh la la la" 2002
- "Samson & Gert 13 – Jiepie ja hee" 2003
- "Hotel op stelten" 2008
- "20 jaar Samson & Gert" 2010

=== Singles ===
- "Samsonrock" (Samson & Gert) 1991
- "Verliefd zijn" (Samson & Gert) 1991
- "Wij gaan naar de maan" (Samson & Gert) 1992
- "10 Miljoen" (Samson & Gert) 1992
- "Samen delen" (Samson & Gert) 1992
- "Samen op de moto" (Samson & Gert) 1992
- "Wij komen naar jou" (Samson & Gert) 1992
- "De snijdersbank" (Samson & Gert) 1992
- "De bel doet 't niet" (Samson & Gert) 1993
- "Repeteren" (Samson & Gert) 1993
- "Piraten-Potpourri" (Samson & Gert) 1993
- "Samson toch!" (Samson & Gert) 1994
- "Wat ben ik blij" (Samson & Gert) 1994
- "Wij zijn bij de brandweer" (Samson & Gert) 1994
- "Als je heel erg veel verliefd bent" 1994 (Samson & Gert)
- "Bij Heidi in Tirol" (Samson & Gert) 1995
- "In de disco" (Samson & Gert) 1995
- "Druk" (Samson & Gert) 1995
- "Wereldberoemd" (Samson & Gert) 1995
- "Wie gaat er mee?" (Samson & Gert) 1996
- "Aap in Huis" (Samson & Gert) 1996
- "De mooiste dag" (Samson & Gert) 1996
- "Wij weten wat liefde is" (Samson & Gert) 1996
- "Het spook van de opera" (Samson & Gert) 1997
- "Jimmy de cowboy" (Samson & Gert) 1997
- "Mannetjes van Mars" (Samson & Gert) 1998
- "Wakker worden" (Samson & Gert) 1998
- "Wij willen voetballen" (Samson & Gert) 1998
- "Roeien" (Samson & Gert) 1998
- "S.O.S." (Samson & Gert) 1998
- "Piloot" (Samson & Gert) 1999
- "Storm op zee" (Samson & Gert) 1999
- "Bim bam bom" (Samson & Gert) 2000
- "De mooiste dromen" (Samson & Gert) 2000
- "Vooruit" (Samson & Gert) 2000
- "Yeah yeah yeah" (Samson & Gert) 2001
- "De wereld is mooi!" (Samson & Gert) 2001
- "We zijn op elkaar" (Samson & Gert) 2001
- "Oh la la la!" (Samson & Gert en de 6 Teens) 2002
- "Olé pistolé" (Samson & Gert en de 6 Teens) 2002
- "Radio" (Samson & Gert) 2003
- "Lieve Samson" (Samson & Gert) 2006
- "Naar zee" (Samson & Gert) 2007
- "Heet" (Samson & Gert) 2008
- "Vrede op aarde" (Samson & Gert) 2008
- "Vrienden voor het leven" (Samson & Gert) 2008
- "Vrolijk liedje" (Samson & Gert) 2008
- "Ik ben verliefd" (Samson & Gert) 2008
- "Alles is op" (Samson & Gert) 2008
- "Oh lalala" (Samson & Gert) 2008
- "Sinterklaas en Zwarte Piet" (Samson & Gert) 2009
- "Springen in de zee" (Samson & Gert) 2009
- "Kerstmis Kerstmis" (Samson & Gert) 2013
- "Wij gaan vliegen" (Samson & Gert) 2013
- "Tingelingeling" (Samson & Gert) 2014
- "Zwaaien" (Samson & Gert) 2014
- "Hiep hiep hiep hoera!" (Samson & Gert) 2015

== Filmography ==
television
Year	Title	Role	Notes
2016 – 2017	Auwch_ (TV Series)	Himself	2 Episodes
2017	Allemaal Familie (TV Series)	Himself	unknown Episodes
2017	t is gebeurd (TV Series)	Himself	1 Episode
2017	K3 zoekt K3 (TV Series)	Himself – Judge	10 Episodes
2016	Het Grootste Licht (TV Series)	Himself – Taskmaster	8 Episodes
2015–present	Achter de Rug (TV Series)	Himself – Speaker / Himself – Guest	2 Episodes
1990–2017	Samson en Gert (TV Series)	Gert	825 episodes
2013 & 2014	Vlaanderen muziekland (TV Series)	Gert	4 episodes
2013	Eva Jinek op zondag (Talk-Show)	Himself – Studio 100 Owner	3 episodes
2013	RTL Late Night (Talk-Show)	Himself – Studio 100 Director	1 episode
2013	Lang Leve (TV Series)	Himself – Special Guest	1 episode
2013	Bingo (TV Series)	Himself	1 episode
2012–present	Vroeger of later? (TV Series)	Himself	3 Episodes
2012	Manneke Paul (Talk Show)	Himself	1 Episode
2010	Peter live (Talk Show)	Himself – Guest	1 Episode
2009	Samson en Gert Kerstverhalen (TV Series)	Gert	10 episodes
2009	K2 zoekt K3 (TV Series)	Himself	Unknown episodes
2009	De schuld van VTM (TV Series)	Himself	2 episodes
2008	De wereld draait door (Talk-Show)	Himself	1 episode
2008	Alles moet weg (TV Series)	Gert	1 episode
2008	Hotel op stelten (TV Series)	Gert	4 episodes
2007	101 vragen aan... (Talk-Show)	Himself – Guest	1 episodes
2007	Beste vrienden (TTalk-Show)	Himself – Candidate	1 episodes
2004	Thuis (TV Movie)	Gert	
2005	Samson en Gert kerstshowspecial (TV Show)	Gert	1 episodes
2004	Het geslacht De Pauw (TV Series)	Himself	1 episodes
2002	Barend en Van Dorp (TV Series)	Himself – Bedenker Kabouter Plop	1 episodes
2001	Debby & Nancy Laid Knight (TV Series)	Himself	1 episodes
1999	Linx (TV Series)	Himself	1 episodes
1999	Watte? (TV Series)	Himself	1 episodes
1997	Laat ze maar lachen (TV Series)	Himself	1 episodes
1992–1997	Zeg eens Euh! (TV Series)	Himself – Host	Unknown episodes
1989	Postbus X (TV Series)	Himself – Host	1 episode
1988	De zevende dag (Talk-Show)	Himself	1 episode

== Filmography (Producer) ==
Film
Year	Title	Role	Released
2015	Blinky Bill the Movie	Executive Producer	1 November 2015 (Netherlands) Filming
2012	Musical: Robin Hood	producer	31 March 2012 (Belgium)
2012	Plop wordt kabouterkoning	producer	25 April 2012 (Netherlands)
2003	De 3 biggetjes	producer	4 April 2003 (Belgium)
2002	Doornroosje, De musical	producer	29 March 2002 (Belgium)
2001	Robin Hood: The Musical	Producer / Director	30 March 2001 (Belgium)
2000 – 2003	Big & Betsy (TV Series)	producer	5 November 2000 (Belgium) 37 episodes
1990–2014	Samson en Gert (TV Series)	producer	2 September 1990 (Belgium) 808 Episodes

== Filmography (Director) ==
Film
Year	Title	Role	Released
2017 – 2018	Gert Late Night (Talk Show) 4 Seasons, 100 Episodes	Director/Host	24 April 2017 (Belgium)
2012	Musical: Robin Hood	director	(Belgium)
2011	Alice in Wonderland – De Musical	director	July 2011 (Belgium)
2010	K3 – Mamase Show	producer	19 May 2010 (Belgium)
2003	De 3 biggetjes (TV Series)	director	4 April 2003 (Belgium)
2002	Doornroosje, De musical	director	29 March 2002 (Belgium)
2001	Robin Hood: The Musical	Producer / Director	30 March 2001 (Belgium)

All Credits here :* Gert Verhulst at IMDb

== See also ==
- Hotel 13
- House of Anubis
- Mega Mindy
- Piet Piraat
- Samson and Gert
- Spring
- Vic the Viking
