= Shaya (singer) =

Danish-born Greek singer (born 1983)

- Born: Marianna Chantelle Hansen; 17 February 1983 (age 43); Copenhagen, Denmark
- Origin: Thessaloniki, Greece
- Occupations: Singer; dancer
- Years active: 2001–present
- Labels: MY Group; Sony Music Greece; Planetworks

Marianna Chantelle Hansen (Greek: Μαριάννα Χάνσεν; born 17 February 1983), known professionally as Shaya, is a Danish-born Greek singer. She was a member of the girl pop band Hi-5, the result of the Greek version of the talent show Popstars in 2003.

== Biography ==
=== Early life ===
Shaya was born in Copenhagen, Denmark to a Danish father and an Indo-Guyanese mother. The family moved to Sweden after her parents' divorce when she was 6. At the age of 12, Shaya and her family immigrated once more, settling in Thessaloniki, Greece. Her mother was a DJ before Shaya's birth. Although Shaya enjoyed singing and dancing from a young age, including performing with SambaSchools in Copenhagen Carnival, she became interested in becoming a singer by luck when she was persuaded to get on stage to sing a song with co-workers after work at a club she worked at in Kavala around age 18.

=== 2001–2005: First professional steps and Hi-5 ===
In 2001, Shaya released her first solo single titled "Release Me" and promoted it around Europe. Between 2001 and 2003, she performed in many clubs in Thessaloniki. Following the encouragement of a friend, in 2003 Shaya entered the Greek version of the talent show Popstars and won a spot in the girl band Hi-5. Shaya, along with the four other girls, Marlen Angelidou, Irini Psyhrami, Froso Papaharalambous, and Nancy Stergiopoulou, had two chart-topping albums and eight singles in two years. The band decided on an amicable split in 2005 after the contract with their record label expired.

=== 2006–2009: Start of solo career ===
After Hi-5 split up, Shaya began a solo career, appearing live in various venues. In 2008, Shaya and Greek singer Kostas Martakis were chosen to record a Greek-language version of Right Here, Right Now from the soundtrack of the Disney film High School Musical 3: Senior Year. The cover was titled "Mikroi Theoi" (Little Gods) and was released as a single from the Greek edition of the film's soundtrack; a music video followed with Martakis and Shaya molded together with scenes from the film. The music video was included as a bonus feature on the Greek edition of the film's home video release. Walt Disney Records, via its international distribution partner EMI, commissioned several local market, foreign-language versions of songs from the entire High School Musical series, although "Mikroi Theoi" was the only Greek version song.

In 2009, Shaya teamed up with Greek hip-hop group Stavento to release the duet "Prin Se Gnoriso" (Before I Meet You), which garnered them a nomination and win for Best Video-Clip Hip-Hop at the 2009 MAD Video Music Awards. Later that year in 2009, Shaya also teamed up with rapper Stereo Mike to release the duet "Esi Kai Ego" (You and I), while she was also part of the Amita Motion Tour 2009.

=== 2010–present: Resurrection, Dancing on Ice, Priscilla Musical, & Eurovision ===
In 2010, Shaya signed with the newly created management, production, and artist development company My Group, active in the dance-pop and club music markets, as well under contract with Sony Music Greece. In May 2010, she released the single "Paizis". In June 2010, she teamed up with Greek DJ and fellow label mate Mark F. Angelo for the song "Far From Everything", which was also chosen as the theme song for the 2010 MAD Video Music Awards, and became a summer hit. The duo also recorded the song "My Radio", which became the official jingle for MAD Radio 106.2. Both songs were featured on Mark F. Angelo's debut album Play.Pause.Stop.Rewind. Following the collaboration, Shaya released the first single from her debut solo album in November 2010 titled "In Your Eyes". She released her debut solo album titled Resurrection in January 2011. Shaya penned music and lyrics to a number of the tracks on the album.

In July 2011, Shaya and Mark F. Angelo were chosen as the opening act for David Guetta's concert in Montenegro. In late 2011, Shaya along with Mark F. Angelo earned the win for Best Greek Act at the 2011 MTV Europe Music Awards, for their collaboration on the single "Far From Everything" as well as several other track collaborations between the two artists. The duo was also shortlisted for Best European Act. In November 2011, Greece's version of Dancing on Ice premiered on ANT1 featuring Shaya as a contestant. She finished fifth in the show.

In December 2011, it was reported that Shaya was in the recording studio recording material for her new album scheduled to be released in the new year. The album was to feature more house and dance elements and less pop elements than her previous album. Following the closure of her record label Sony Music Greece, the album did not end up being released.

In 2013, Shaya performed a cover of "Walking on Air" alongside Anise K and Ivi Adamou at the Mad Video Music Award 2013. Later that same year and into 2014, Shaya took up a residency at the newly opened Fleurs nightclub at the Radisson Royal Hotel in Dubai. In between shows, she also held one of three lead singer roles in the musical Priscilla, at the Badminton theater in Athens.

During summer 2014 Shaya toured around Greece performing together with other artists. She also visited Denmark to record some songs for her coming solo album, and had 2 performances at the week-long festival Køge Festuge close to Copenhagen.

In December 2014, she began a residency at Fotaerios club in Athens.

In February 2015, Greek broadcaster NERIT announced that she was selected as one of five acts bidding to represent Greece in the Eurovision Song Contest 2015. A national final to select the act took place on 4 March 2015 and Shaya placed 3rd out of the 5 acts. Shaya is currently signed to the record label Planetworks.

April 2015 Shaya released her new video single “ΕΥΚΟΛΑ”, “EASY”.

That same year she collaborated with Dino MFU with the song I’m in love released by “Zero 10 records” and also a song with BO called “Kalokairini kardia” released by Cobalt Music.

In 2016 Shaya acted and sunf in the musical “Sweet charity” at Badminton Theater in Athens.

In February she featured in the music video Dirty Talk by Kon Cept, entering top 100 at several charts around the globe.

She also signed a record deal with www.spider-music.com, and released her first single and music video “MΑΖΙ και ΜΑΚΡΙΑ” with lyrics written by award-winning lyricist, for her soon coming second solo album.

July 2016 Shaya and her new live band The Dominants started their live summer tour in Thessaloniki.

August 2024 she performed in Parga

== Discography ==
=== Studio albums ===
- 2011: Resurrection

== Videography ==
=== Television ===
Year	Title	Role	Notes
2003	Popstars	Herself	Contestant; 1st place
2004	Mad Video Music Awards	Herself	Performer as a member of Hi-5
2006	Mad Video Music Awards	Herself	Performer
2010	Mad Video Music Awards	Herself	Video Performer
2011	Mad Video Music Awards	Herself	Performer
2011 - 2012	Dancing On Ice	Herself	Contestant; 5th place
2012	Mad Video Music Awards	Herself	Performer
2013	Mad Video Music Awards	Herself	Performer

=== Music videos ===
Years	Song
2008	Mikroi Theoi (Right Here Right Now) (Kostas Martakis - Shaya)
2009	Prin Se Gnoriso (Ta Kakos Keimena) (Stavento feat. Shaya)
2010	Far From Everything (Mark F. Angelo feat. Shaya)
2011	In Your Eyes
2011	If Only (OtherView Mix)
2012	Lene
2012	Summer Is All Around (Shaya, HouseTwins & Slick Beats)
2013	Love Me
2013	I'm In Love (Dino MFU feat. Shaya)
2013	Kalokairini Kardia (BO feat. Shaya)
2013	Turn It Up (Shaya feat. BO)
2014	I Wonder (Dino MFU feat. Shaya)
2014	Giati Prepei (Shaya feat. Zeraw)
2014	Heaven (Mark Angelo feat. Shaya)
2015	Sunshine
2015	Eukola

=== Mad Video Music Awards - live performances ===
Year	Song
2006	Misirlou / Pump It (Eleni Tsaligopoulou feat. Stereo Mike, Shaya)
2010	Far From Everything (Mark F. Angelo feat. Shaya)
2011	All Star Medley (Stan - Reckless - Claydee - Shaya - Mark Angelo - Slick Beats)
2012	Summer Is All Around (HouseBeats Remix) (Shaya, HouseTwins & Slick Beats)
2013	Walking On Air (Anise K. feat. Ivi Adamou & Shaya)

== Awards and nominations ==
=== Mad Video Music Awards ===
Year	Nominated work	Award	Result
2009	Prin Se Gnoriso (Ta Kakos Keimena)	Video Clip Of The Year	Nominated
2009	Prin Se Gnoriso (Ta Kakos Keimena)	Video Clip Hip Hop	Won
2009	Mikroi Theoi	Best Duet - Collaboration	Nominated
2011	Far From Everything	Video Clip Dance	Nominated
2011	Far From Everything	Video Clip Of The Year	Nominated
2011	Far From Everything	Mad Radio 106,2 Track Of The Year	Nominated
2011	In Your Eyes	Fashion Icon	Nominated
2012	Lene	Fashion Icon	Nominated
2013	Love Me	Fashion Icon	Nominated

=== MTV Europe Music Awards ===
Year	Recipient	Award	Result
2011	Mark F. Angelo feat. Shaya	Best Greek Act	Won
2011	Mark F. Angelo feat. Shaya	Best European Act	Nominated
