= Kabouter Plop =

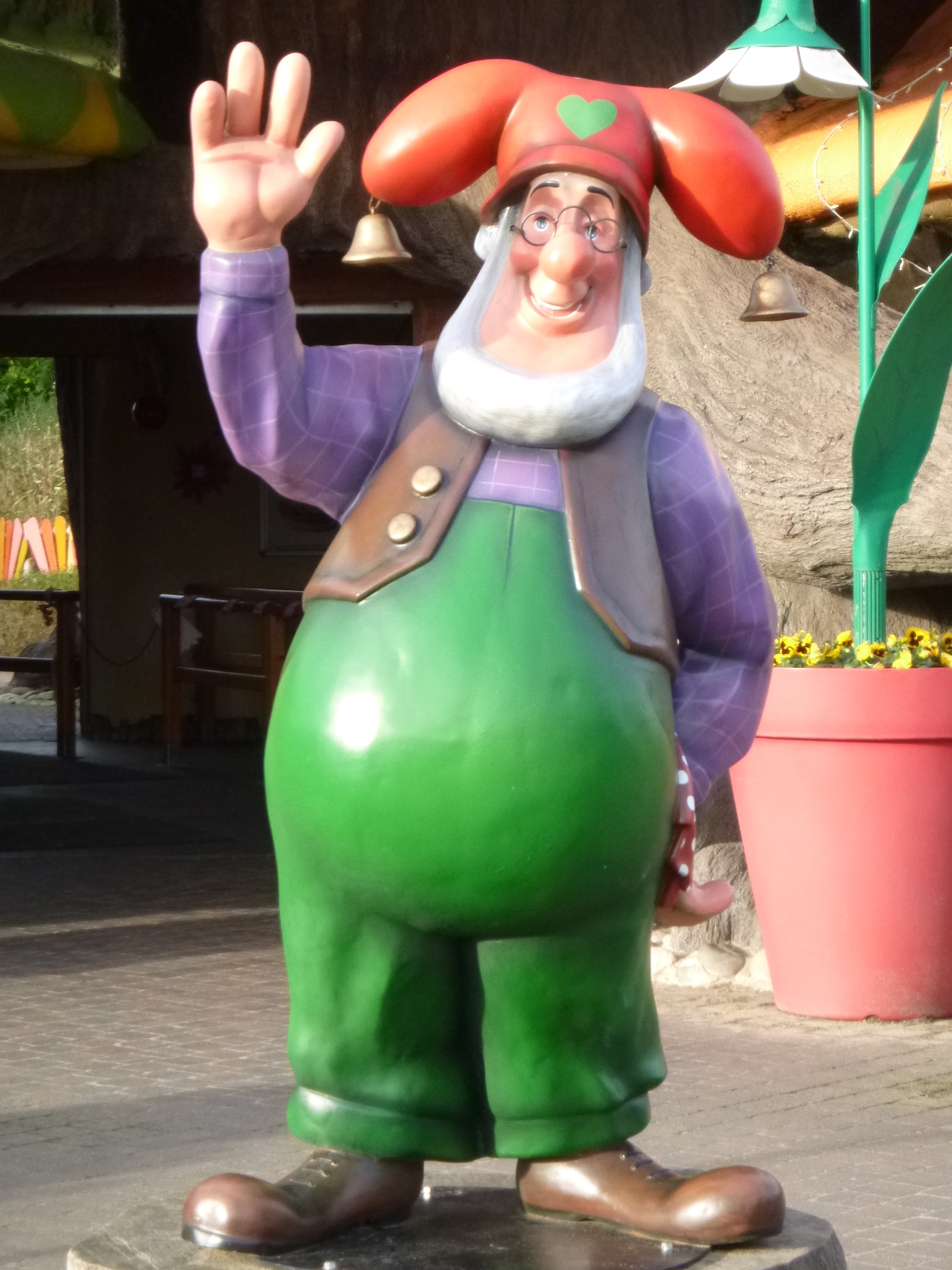
- Kabouter Plop statue in Plopsaland
- Also known as: Plop the Gnome
- Genre: Children's program
- Created by: Danny Verbiest, Gert Verhulst, Hans Bourlon
- Written by: Danny Verbiest, Gert Verhulst, Hans Bourlon
- Directed by: Bart Van Leemputten
- Starring: Walter De Donder (1997–present); Agnes De Nul (1997–present); Chris Cauwenberghs (1997–2014); Aimé Anthoni (1997–present); Luc Caals (1998–2007, 2010–2011, 2013); Hilde Vanhulle (1999–present); Maxine Janssens (2017–present)
- Music by: Lyrics: Danny Verbiest, Gert Verhulst, Hans Bourlon, Bart Peeters, Jasper Verheugd, Drik Nielandt, Hans van Eijk; Music: Johan Vanden Eede, Bart Peeters, Fonny De Wulf, Patrick Hamilton, Sammy Bruggeman, Kees Tel
- Country of origin: Belgium
- Original language: Dutch
- No. of episodes: 295

Production
- Producer: Studio 100
- Running time: Up to 9 minutes

Original release
- Network: Vmma, TROS, RTL
- Release: 27 August 1997 – present

Kabouter Plop (Plop the Gnome) is a Belgian children's television program produced by Studio 100, that focuses on the adventures of the titular gnome. The series has been running since August 27, 1997.

== Series ==
The television series Kabouter Plop (Plop the Gnome) is directed by Bart Van Leemputten and consists of short episodes, each lasting approximately five minutes. These episodes usually take place in Plop's milk inn (Mushroom cottage), where Plop Milk and Plop Cookies are available, or in the Gnome Forest. Often, the story unfolds after a mischievous joke by the naughty Klus (Fixy the Gnome).

Each episode begins with Plop lying in bed and telling about the day's adventures. At the end of the episode, he mentions that he is going to 'Gnome Dreamland.' Usually, each episode conveys a small life lesson.

The television series has been (or was) broadcast on:

- VTM at TamTam
- vtmKzoom (until 2019)
- VTM Kids Jr. (since 2019)
- Club RTL
- AVROTROS (on childeren's television channel Zappelin)

== Episodes ==
The first episode of Kabouter Plop was "De slingergrammofoon (The pendulum gramophone)," which aired on August 27, 1997. The second episode, "Taart voor Kwebbel (Pie for Kwebbel)," was broadcast on August 28, 1997. In total, 295 episodes were recorded and aired. Afterward, several movies were also produced. Starting from September 2017, new episodes were aired under the name Plop en Felle.

== International versions ==
- Lutin Plop is the French version of Kabouter Plop (Plop the Gnome). It featured dubbed episodes from 2005 to 2007. Since 2007, episodes have been re-recorded with French actors.
- Plop el Gnomo is the Spanish version of Kabouter Plop (Plop the Gnome). It featured dubbed episodes from 2009.
- Kabauter Plop is the German version of Kabouter Plop (Plop the Gnome). It featured dubbed episodes from 2010.

== Cast ==
| Character | Actor/actress | Period |
|---|---|---|
| Kabouter Plop | Walter De Donder | 1997–present |
| Kabouter Kwebbel | Agnes De Nul | 1997–present |
| Kabouter Lui | Chris Cauwenberghs | 1997–2014 |
| Kabouter Klus | Aimé Anthoni | 1997–present |
| Kabouter Smul | Luc Caals | 1998-2007, 2010-2011, 2013 |
| Kabouter Smal | Hilde Vanhulle | 1999–present |
| Kabouter Felle | Maxine Janssens | 2017–present |

== Characters ==
The characters in the episodes are caricatural. Each gnome has their own peculiarities. Common to all gnomes are their large bellies, long elf noses, oversized clown shoes, and two-pointed toques that go up in the air when the gnomes are startled, surprised, or scared, accompanied. Their language is also unique, especially in their exclamations.

=== Kabouter Plop (Plop the Gnome) ===
Kabouter Plop (Plop the Gnome) is the wisest and most responsible gnome. He is the owner of the milk inn. He has a heart on his toque, a white beard, and glasses.

=== Kabouter Kwebbel (Chatty the Gnome) ===
Kabouter Kwebbel is a female gnome with long blonde braids. She is talkative and repeats everything that happens or is said unnecessarily. She has a small flower on her toque and is somewhat fearful and easily offended. When she enters a room, she says, "Dag, dag, dag, dag" (Hello).

=== Kabouter Lui (Lazy the Gnome) ===
Kabouter Lui, officially named Lucibert, is a postman by profession. After his characteristic phrase, "Ik word daar zo moe van" (I'm getting so tired of this), he usually falls asleep immediately, although this is not always the case. His toque has a carrier pigeon with a letter, and he has a dark beard (sometimes dark gray, sometimes dark brown). When he enters a room, he says, "Volk" (Hi People).

=== Kabouter Klus (Fixy the Gnome) ===
Kabouter Klus often plays pranks that usually backfire on him, and he enjoys fixing things. Klus tries to excel in everything or boast about his skills, which often gets him into trouble. Before he shows off his skills, he usually says, "Ja, dat is normaal, hè? Ah ja, ik ben als het ware de beste (...)er van heel het Kabouterdorp" (Yes, that's not a surprise! Ah yes, I'm actually kind of the best (...) in the whole Gnome Village). His toque is patched up, he wears overalls with a hammer, has a reddish beard, and wears glasses. When he enters a room, his standard greeting is "Hallokidoki" (Hello there). Something else he often says, especially when he's planning something, is "Tsjoep Tsjoep."

=== Kabouter Smul (Glutton the Gnome) ===
This character was added in 1998. Smul has an obsession with food, eats a lot, and can't control himself. He is a professional cook. This gnome is much thicker than the other gnomes in the Gnome Forest. He has a neck beard, and a rolling pin is depicted on his toque. When he enters a room, he says, "Hoipiepeloi." (Hi everyone).

=== Kabouter Smal (Small the Gnome) ===
This character was added in 1999. She is the most beautiful gnome in the Gnome Forest, and is slimmer than the other gnomes. A butterfly is depicted on her toque. In the pocket of her skirt, she always carries a mirror and a powder brush, which she uses when she says, "Oepsie poepsie, dan ga ik me eerst nog een beetje mooi maken" (Oopsie poopsie, I'll make myself a little prettier). After this, the male gnomes usually respond with, "Maar nee Smalletje, je bent al mooi genoeg!" (But no Smal, you're already beautiful enough!). When she enters a room, she greets the attendees with "Halloetoedeloe" (Hello there).

=== Kabouter Felle (Felle the Gnome) ===
This character was added in 2017, in celebration of Kabouter Plop's 20th anniversary. Felle is the young niece of Kabouter Plop. Felle, like Plop, has a heart on her toque and is recognizable by her bright blue shoes.

== Movies ==
In addition to the television series, there are movies featuring Kabouter Plop:

Kabouter Plop movies
| Nr. | Title | Premiere |
| 1 | De Kabouterschat | 1999 |
| 2 | Plop in de Wolken | 2000 |
| 3 | Plop en de Toverstaf | 2003 |
| 4 | Plop en Kwispel | 2004 |
| 5 | Plop en het vioolavontuur | 2005 |
| 6 | Plop in de stad | 2006 |
| 7 | Plop en de Pinguïn | 2007 |
| 8 | De kabouterschat (remake) | 2008 |
| 9 | Plop en de kabouterbaby | 2009 |
| 10 | Plop wordt Kabouterkoning | 2012 |

== Merchandise ==
=== Books ===
1. De loopwedstrijd
2. Klus wil vliegen
3. Touwtrekken
4. Het spook
5. De schoorsteenveger
6. Het vlot
7. Feest in het bos
8. Dokter Kwebbel
9. Smul eet zijn buikje rond
10. De rolstoel
11. Agent Smal
12. Klus is uitvinder
13. Het moerasmonster
14. Klus klust
15. De taartengooier
16. De ruimtereis
17. De duikboot
18. De robot
19. Boodschap in een fles
20. Neefje Pats
21. De baby
22. De dierentuin
23. De kabouterbrandweer
24. De kaboutersint
25. Het kasteel van Klus
26. Het vliegtuig
27. Klus beklimt een berg
28. De kangoeroe
29. De schildpad
30. De ijspaddenstoel
31. Klus de goochelaar
32. Eendjes op bezoek
33. Feetje Fien
34. Het reuzenrad
35. De kabouterspelen
36. Het zwembad
37. Het bijtje
38. De beverdam
39. Het bibberbos
40. Hop Plop hop!
41. Stekelklus
42. Kabouter Bikkebik
43. Klus en de kevers
44. Lui in de was

== Comics ==
Following the success of the movies, comic strips based on Kabouter Plop were also published. The series was illustrated by Wim Swerts and Vanas, with the comic adaptation by Jean-Pol. The strips were released by Studio 100. The strip characters made a guest appearance in the Kiekeboe album Bij Fanny op schoot.

Kabouter Plop Comics

1. De kabouterschat (1999)
2. Plop in de wolken (2000)
3. Plop en de toverstaf (2003)
4. Plop en Kwispel (2004)

== Songs ==
The songs of Kabouter Plop were highly popular with both children and adults. Hits like "De Kabouterdans" spent weeks on the charts in both Belgium and the Netherlands and were played at parties with an often adult target audience. "De Kabouterdans" spent 64 weeks in the Dutch Mega Top 100 in 2000, 2001 and 2002, setting a record as the longest-charting single for eight years. The record was eventually broken on February 2, 2010, after 'De Kabouterdans' spent 67 weeks in the Top 100.

Most of the songs were associated with specific, simple dance moves (such as the "Ganzenpas".

== Products ==
A variety of commercial products related to 'Kabouter Plop' are available, including school supplies, clothing, "Plop" cookies, "Plop" milk and lunchboxes.

== Amusement parks ==
The amusement park Plopsaland, owned by Studio 100, which also produces Kabouter Plop, is located in Adinkerke - De Panne in Belgium (formerly known as Meli Park). Since 2005, an indoor amusement park in Hasselt was established Studio 100 acquired the park near the Coo Waterfalls. In April 2010, the first Dutch park, Plopsa Indoor Coevorden, was opened. The park in Germany is known as Holiday Park Plopsa.

== The Plop Newspaper ==
Starting from March 11, 1998, De Plopkrant (The Plop Newspaper) was available as a free supplement with Het Laatste Nieuws and De Nieuwe Gazet. It contained letters, stories, and games. On July 19, 2000, De Plopkrant was replaced by De Plopsakrant.

== Digital singles ==
=== Songs ===
- Kabouter Plop is jarig (2007)
- Hopsa (2009)
- Daar is het circus (2010)
- Tippie toe (2010)
- Biebabeloeba baby (2010)
- Wat een feest! (2012)
- Kabouterkermis (2013)
- Wat zou ik wensen? (2013)
- Dat zijn de Peppers (2015)

=== Stories ===
- Schatten in de beek (2010)

=== Dvd's ===
| DVDs with hit rankings in the Dutch Music Top 30 | Date of publication | Date of entry | Highest position | Amount of weeks | Comments |
|---|---|---|---|---|---|
| De ton en vele andere verhalen en liedjes... | 1999 | 22-05-1999 | 1(3wk) | 4 | |
| Lui bokser en vele andere verhalen en liedjes... | 1999 | 22-05-1999 | 1(6wk) | 19 | |
| Breien en vele andere verhalen en liedjes... | 1999 | 24-07-1999 | 1(3wk) | 16 | |
| Het ei en vele andere verhalen en liedjes... | 1999 | 04-12-1999 | 1(4wk) | 6 | |
| De kabouterschat | 1999 | 25-12-1999 | 1(16wk) | 17 | |
| Plop show - de Fopkampioen | 2012 | 24-03-2012 | 3 | 26 | |
| Plop show - Vakantie vol verrassingen | 2013 | 10-08-2013 | 13 | 8 | |
| Plop in de speelgoedwinkel | 2014 | 28-06-2014 | 15 | 14 | |
| De beste Plop shows volume 3 | 2016 | 05-03-2016 | 10 | 28 | |
| Plop 20 | 2017 | 02-09-2017 | 3 | 8 | |

| DVDs with hit rankings in the Flemish Ultratop music DVD top 10/20 | Date of appearing | Date of entry | Highest position | Amount of weeks | Comments |
|---|---|---|---|---|---|
| Plop show - Het circus | 2010 | 26-06-2010 | 1(2wk) | 10 | |
| Plop show - De fopkampioen | 2012 | 24-03-2012 | 1(6wk) | 75 | |
| Plop show - Vakantie vol verrassingen | 2013 | 27-07-2013 | 1(5wk) | 54 | |
| Plop in de speelgoedwinkel | 2014 | 28-06-2014 | 1(9wk) | 9* | |

== Theater shows ==
- Plopshow I (1998/1999)
- Plopshow II (1999)
- Plopshow III (2000)
- Lalala tour (2001/2002)
- Kabouter Plop en het kabouterfeest (2002/2003)
- Kabouterkriebels (2003/2004)
- Kabouter Plop en de Tovernootjes (2004/2005)
- Kabouter Plop en de Treitertrol (2005/2006)
- Kabouter Plop en het Muizenmeisje (2006/2007)
- Kabouter Plop en de muziekkampioen (2008)
- Kabouter Plop en het bezoek van Pinki (2008/2009)
- Kabouter Plop en het circus (2009/2010)
- Kabouter Plop gaat trouwen (2010/2011)
- Kabouter Plop de fopkampioen (2011/2012)
- Kabouter Plop: Vakantie vol verrassingen (2012/2013)
- Kabouter Plop: Plop in de speelgoedwinkel (2013/2014)
- Kabouter Plop: Plop en het sprookjesboek (2014/2015)
- Kabouter Plop: Het Plop-up restaurant (2018)
- Kabouter Plop: Een nieuwe muts voor Plop (2022)

== Studio 100 Zomerfestival ==
Kabouter Plop, along with Klus, Kwebbel, and Lui, made appearances at all Studio 100 Zomerfestivals. In 2003 and 2004, Smul and Smal also joined the festivities.

== Other information ==
- Alongside Samson & Gert, Kabouter Plop is one of the most popular series produced by Studio 100.
- In the beginning, the toques' hatpoints went up in the air with strings, this was later automated with a machine under the toques.
- The oldest actor from the Kabouter Plop franchise is Chris Cauwenberghs.
