= Walking on Air (Anise K song) =

Single by Anise K featuring Snoop Dogg, Bella Blue, Lance Bass and Ian Thomas
- Released: January 13, 2014
- Recorded: 2012–2013
- Genre: House
- Length: 3:46
- Label: Sony
- Songwriters: Anise K; KC Porter; Snoop Dogg
- Producers: Anise K; KC Porter

Anise K singles chronology
"I Feel Good" (2009)	"Walking on Air" (2014)

"Walking on Air" is a song recorded by the Australian recording artist and producer Anise K. The song originally features guest vocals from the American rapper Snoop Dogg and the American singer Bella Blue (now known as iyla). In January 2014 it was re-released worldwide with additional vocals by Lance Bass (and additionally, for release in Belgium, Ian Thomas), produced by former Michael Jackson producer Marc Schaffel.

== Background and composition ==
"Walking on Air" was written by Anise K with KC Porter and rap parts by Snoop Dogg, while production was handled by Anise K, KC Porter and Seth Johnson. The song was originally produced with the intention of having Rihanna feature as the lead singer. Due to scheduling issues, Anise had to search for an alternative artist. Bella Blue was brought in as a session singer to pitch the song to potential other artists. The quality of her performance secured her role for the final song. Later, hip hop singer Snoop Dogg came aboard. It was recorded in Perth (Australia) taking opportunity of Snoop Dogg's visit for 2012 Summadayze.

KC Porter, 3-time Grammy award winning producer, overlooked the project officially mixed by Phil Tan, also a 3-time Grammy award recipient.

== Music video ==
The music video was released on Vimeo by video producer Igor Shmaryan on November 14, 2012. Later it was published through Sony Music to Vevo.

The video was shot in two sections. One portion of the video was shot in Las Vegas (Nevada) directed by KC Porter and the other portion was shot in Sydney (Australia) directed by Jared Beekhuyzen for JAI Films. Featured in the video are Anise K, Snoop Dogg and Bella Blue set in a mix of dry desert, Sydney streets, and Snoop Dogg shots.

== Live performances ==
On June 25, 2013, Anise K performed the song for the first time live on international television at the MAD Awards in Greece alongside Ivi Adamou and Shaya, two of Greece's top Pop sensations. Thousands of fans live in the stadium and millions across Europe watched the much anticipated performance at the awards. The song was also used as the opening number for the Miss Universe 2013 pageant in Moscow, Russia on November 9, 2013.

== Chart positions ==
=== Weekly charts ===
Weekly chart performance for "Walking on Air"
Chart (2013–14)	Peak position
Belgium (Ultratop 50 Flanders)	4
Russia Airplay (TopHit)	6
Ukraine Airplay (TopHit)	34

=== Year-end charts ===
Year-end chart performance for "Walking on Air"
Chart (2013)	Position
Russia Airplay (TopHit)	34
Ukraine Airplay (TopHit)	66
