= Piet Piraat =

Flemish children's program

- Created by: Danny Verbiest; Gert Verhulst; Hans Bourlon
- Starring: Peter Van De Velde; Anke Helsen; Dirk Bosschaert; Dirk Van Vooren; Vic De Wachter; Remi De Smet
- Composer: Alexius Tschallener
- Country of origin: Belgium
- Original language: Dutch
- No. of seasons: 3
- No. of episodes: 120

Production
- Executive producer: Bart Van Leemputten
- Cinematography: Alain Jongen
- Camera setup: Videotape (filmized); Multi-camera
- Running time: 5 minutes
- Production company: Studio 100

Original release
- Network: Ketnet
- Release: 24 December 2001 – 11 November 2004

Piet Piraat (translated as Pirate Pete in English) is a Flemish children's program written and produced by Studio 100. It was broadcast in Belgium on Ketnet and in the Netherlands on Z@PP.

Pirate Pete is a good-natured pirate who crosses the Seven Seas with his crew, getting into various adventures. The five-minute stories bear resemblance to Studio 100's main production, Samson en Gert, and mostly deal with the same subject matter: "cheaters never win" and "honesty is the best policy".

== Characters ==
The series features four characters.

Piet Piraat "Pirate Pete" (Peter Van De Velde) is the captain of the Scheve Schuit (The Crooked Barge in English, although its translation is different in tons of media). He appears to be far more intelligent than the others and is always there to resolve any problems or fights.

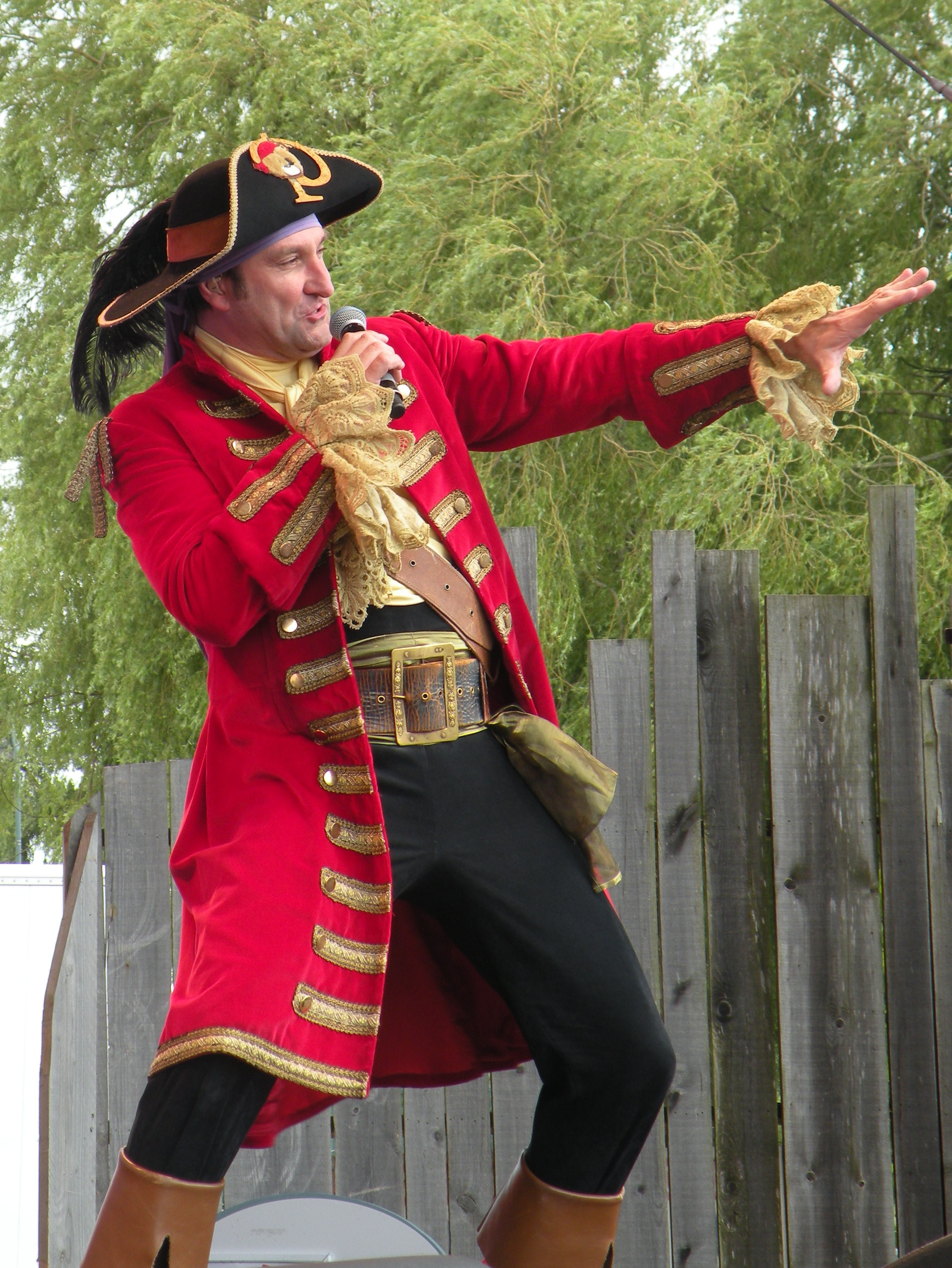
Piet Piraat in Plopsaland, Belgium

Stien Struis "Tracey Tough" (Anke Helsen) is a strong, but a little dim, who tries to solve everything by using her strength, managing only to break stuff in the process.

Berend Brokkenpap "Gordon Gruel" (Dirk Bosschaert) is the ship's chef and a decidedly sneaky character. Berend is constantly causing problems, staging pranks and generally annoying the rest of the crew, but he always gets his comeuppance, only to fall back into his old behaviour after apologizing.

Steven Stil "Quiet Quentin" (Dirk van Vooren): His name translates to 'Silent Steve' since he is unable to talk. Although Steven is Berend's sidekick, he often finds himself on the receiving end of whatever it is that goes wrong.

== Comic adaptations ==
Between 2002 and 2012, Piet Piraat was adapted into a comics series by Wim Swerts and Luc Van Asten.

== Film adaptations ==
There are four feature-length films of Piet Piraat in total. The first one was from 2005 called Piet Piraat en de Betoverende Kroon. The characters include captain Snorrebaard played by Johnny Kraaijkamp Jr. and a siren called Polyfonia played by Grietje Vanderheijden while her singing voice is done by Helen Geets. Other films are Piet Piraat en het Vliegende Schip in 2006, Piet Piraat en het zwaard van Zilvertand (The Sword of Silvertooth) in 2008, and Piet Piraat en het zeemonster in 2013.

== Spin-off ==
A spin-off of the series called "Piet Piraat Wonderwaterwereld" ("Pirate Pete Wonderwaterworld") was released in 2010. In this series Piet teaches the viewers about life in the ocean. The other cast members are not seen in this show.
