= Walter De Donder =

Belgian actor and politician

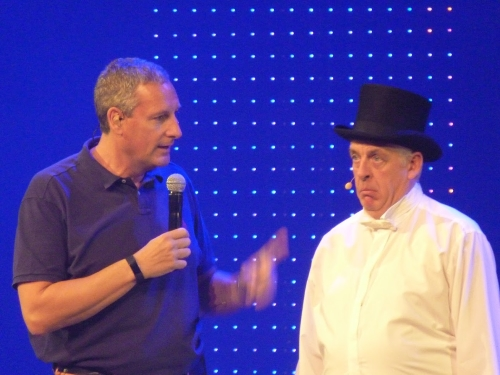
Walter De Donder and Gert Verhulst in 2017

Walter De Donder (born 12 July 1961) is a Belgian actor and politician and is best known for parts in Flemish children's television series.

== Career ==
De Donder started in entertainment as an amateur and performed with a puppet called Bibberlip. His breakthrough came in 1989 when he was asked to play the role of De Burgemeester (the mayor) in children's TV show Samson en Gert. Through this role he was able to become a professional actor. In 1997 he took on the role of the title character in the children's series Kabouter Plop, produced by Studio 100. His roles as De Burgemeester and Kabouter Plop made him a celebrity both in Belgium and in the Netherlands.

He was a member of the cast of the satirical programme Brussel Nieuwsstraat ("Brussels News Street") that ran from 2000 to 2002. This programme also featured Koen Crucke, another veteran of Samson and Gert.

De Donder is active in the Flemish Christian Democrat party CD & V. In 2000 he was elected to Affligem local council in a coalition with N-VA, and he was reelected in the 2006 local elections. During party coalition talks, it was agreed that he would become mayor from 2011 and he took on this role on the first of January of that year. He was re-elected as mayor in 2012 and 2018. In 2019 he was an unsuccessful candidate in his party's leadership contest. In 2024 he became elected as mayor of Affligem with the political party "team burgemeester" (team mayor).

== Filmography ==
Television

- Samson en Gert (1989 – ) Mr. Mayor
- F.C. De Kampioenen (F.C. The Champions) (1990) extra in the first season
- F.C. de Kampioenen (F.C. The Champions) (2006) episode "Food Poisoning" as Inspecteur Kimpe
- Kabouter Plop (1997 – ) television – Kabouter Plop
- Brussel Nieuwsstraat (Brussels News Street) (2000) TV series – Flik
- Urban Zone (January 3, 2004) episode "Flight Crime"

Film

- God, Verdomme !? (God Damn !?) (1996)
- De Kabouterschat (The Gnome Treasure) (1999) – Kabouter Plop
- Plop in de Wolken (Plop in the Clouds) (2000) – Kabouter Plop
- Plop en de Toverstaf (Plop and the Magic Wand) (2003) – Kabouter Plop
- Plop en Kwispel (Plop and Kwispel) (2004) – Kabouter Plop
- Plop en het vioolavontuur (Plop and the Violin Adventure) (2005) - Kabouter Plop
- Plop in de stad (Plop in the city) (2006) – Kabouter Plop
- Plop en de Pinguïn (Plop and the Penguin) (2007) – Kabouter Plop
- Samson en Gert: Hotel op Stelten (Hotel on Stilts) (2008) – Mr. Mayor
- Plop en de kabouterbaby (Plop and the gnome baby) (2009) – Kabouter Plop
