= De Grote Sprong =

Flemish reality television series

- Genre: Reality show
- Based on: Celebrity Splash!
- Creative director: Hans Otten
- Presented by: Kürt Rogiers, Evi Hanssen
- Country of origin: Belgium
- Original language: Dutch
- No. of seasons: 1
- No. of episodes: 6

Production
- Camera setup: Multi-camera
- Running time: 90 minutes

Original release
- Network: VTM
- Release: 30 August – 4 October 2013

De Grote Sprong (The Great Leap) is a Flemish reality television series broadcast on VTM. The program is based on the Celebrity Splash! format created by Dutch company Eyeworks. In each episode, six celebrities perform dives after being trained by professionals Hassan Mouti, Tanya Ilieva, and Steve Black. The dives are judged by a panel consisting of Frans van de Konijnenburg, Anna Bader, and Frédérik Deburghgraeve. The program is hosted by Evi Hanssen and Kürt Rogiers.

The show was recorded in Bruges. Season 1 winner was Tanja Dexters.

== Season 1 (2013) ==
Celebrity	Know For	Round 1	Round 2	Round 3	Semifinal 1	Semifinal 2	Finale
Tanja Dexters	Miss Belgium 1998 & TV Presenter		3		1		1
Ian Thomas	Singer	1				2	2
Kevin Rans	Pole Vaulter		1		2		3
Sean Dhondt	Nailpin Musician	-		3	3		3
Niels De Jonck	Model		2			1	5
Sonja Kimpen	Health Expert		4			3	6
Michael Pas	Actor			1		4	X
Sergio Quisquater	Singer	4			4	X	X
Rik Verheye	Actor			2		5	X
Cedric Dumont	Stuntman			4		6	X
Véronique De Kock	Presenter & Model	2			6	X	X
Stephanie Planckaert	De Planckaerts Star			5	X	X	X
Anouchka Balsing	Dancer	5			X	X	X
Jo Hens	Actor & Presenter		5		X	X	X
Jess Donckers	Model & Presenter			6	X	X	X
Kato	Singer		6		X	X	X
Hanne Troonbeeckx	Presenter			7	X	X	X
