= Evi Hanssen =

Belgian singer and television presenter

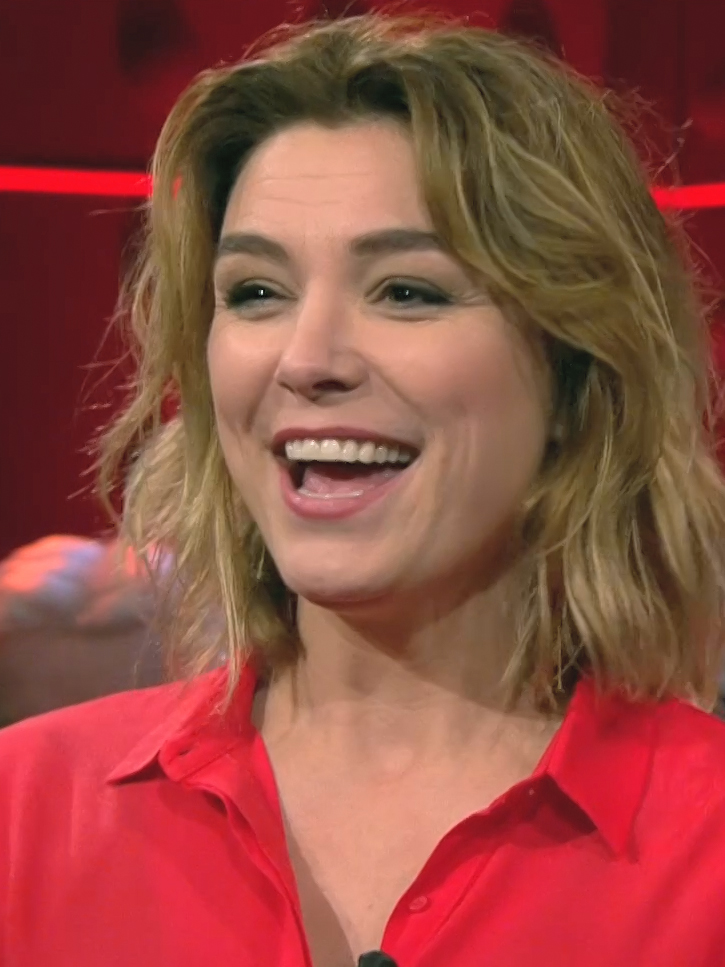
- Born: Evi Greta Roberta Hanssen; 9 November 1978 (age 47); Zoersel, Belgium
- Occupations: Singer; presenter
- Years active: 1995–
- Presenting career
- Stations: TMF Flanders; VTM
- Previous show: Samson en Gert

Evi Greta Roberta Hanssen (born 9 November 1978) is a Flemish singer and presenter.

== Biography ==
Hanssen grew up with three older brothers in Antwerp. She started as a background singer in the Samson en Gert Christmas shows and played on her 16th in Samson en Gert Sofie, the niece of the mayor. Hanssen was second in the election for 'Look of the year' in 1996. After secondary school she studied at the Jazzstudio in Antwerp for two years and received her candidacy as a jazz singer at the conservatory.

=== Career ===
In April 2001 Hanssen started as a VJ on TMF Flanders, where she presented with Elke Vanelderen in Boobietrap. She also presented at major festivals such as Marktrock, Suikerrock, TW Classic and I Love Techno. She interviewed Lenny Kravitz and Justin Timberlake, among others. In the summer of 2002 she was asked to replace Yasmine at Aan tafel on TV1. She was also regularly seen in Het Swingpaleis.

Her debut single "Down as she goes" with the group Hookers Green became the favourite song of Greenpeace in Belgium. The song is about the decline of the world in every possible way.

In October 2003 she left TMF to concentrate on her music. She worked on a theatre jazz project and on a Dutch-language album with Patrick Hamilton. She was heard as a flying reporter at Radio Donna staat op and can be seen on the sports channel Sporza. For Garfield: The Movie she dubbed the voice of the American cartoon cat. She then worked for VTM, where she presented De Farm and 71° Noord.

From 2006 to 2013 she presented Expeditie Robinson annually. Since March 2007 she can also be seen in De Foute Quiz and GodzijDank. In 2008 and 2009, Evi presented the Flemish version of Project Runway, De Designers. In 2010 she was on show in De dagshow, a showbiz programme on VTM.

In 2013 she presented with Kürt Rogiers in De Grote Sprong, in 2014 Beat da Bompaz and Mijn Pop-uprestaurant. From 2014 she can be seen on Dutch television in "3 op Reis". In September 2014 she started as a table lady at De Wereld Draait Door. In 2016, together with Freek Vonk, she presented De Super Freek Show.

In 2019, she was a candidate on the Dutch television show Wie is de Mol? She was the first candidate to leave the game in episode 2.

=== Private life ===
Hanssen married in September 2005 to Fred di Bono, front man of the Belgian formation Silverene. They founded the production house Bonhanssa together. Later they had two children. The couple split up at the end of 2011.

== Television ==
Years	Title	Notes
1995–96	Samson en Gert	Actress (Sofie)
2001	Boobietrap	Presenter
2002	Aan Tafel	Presenter
2003	Garfield	Voice
2003	De Farm	Presenter
2003	71° Noord	Presenter
2006–13	Expeditie Robinson	Presenter
2007	De Foute Quiz	Presenter
2007	GodzijDank	Presenter
2008–09	De Designers	Presenter, Flemish version of Project Runway
2010–11	De dagshow	Presenter, showbizz programme
2013	Funnymals	Voice actress of the week
2013	De Grote Sprong	Presenter
2014	Beat da Bompaz	Presenter
2014	Mijn Pop-uprestaurant	Presenter
2014–present	3 op Reis	Presenter
2014–present	De Wereld Draait Door	Table lady
2016	De Super Freek Show	Presenter
2018	Wie is de Mol?	Candidate
2021	Over de Oceaan	Candidate

== Radio ==
Years	Title	Notes
2021–present	De Wild in de Middag	Co-host

== Discography ==
=== Singles ===
Single with hit notation(s) in the Flemish Ultratop 50	Year of appearance	Date of entry	Highest position	No. of weeks	Notes
When I'm away from U	2007	17 Feb 2017	tip18	–	with Fred Di Bono
Het aya lied	2012	29 Sep 2012	14	3	

== Trivia ==
- UMA, the band of Evi Hanssen, released their first album, Polaroid, at the end of 2011.
- Hanssen can be seen in the video Ik vind je lekker from The Haagse band De Kraaien
- In 2004 Hanssen participated in the second season of De Slimste Mens ter Wereld. During her first participation she lost the final and consequently she had to leave the quiz.
- In 2017 Hanssen again participated in De Slimste Mens ter Wereld. This time she kept the one episode longer.
