= Ian Thomas (Belgian musician) =

Belgian singer songwriter and model

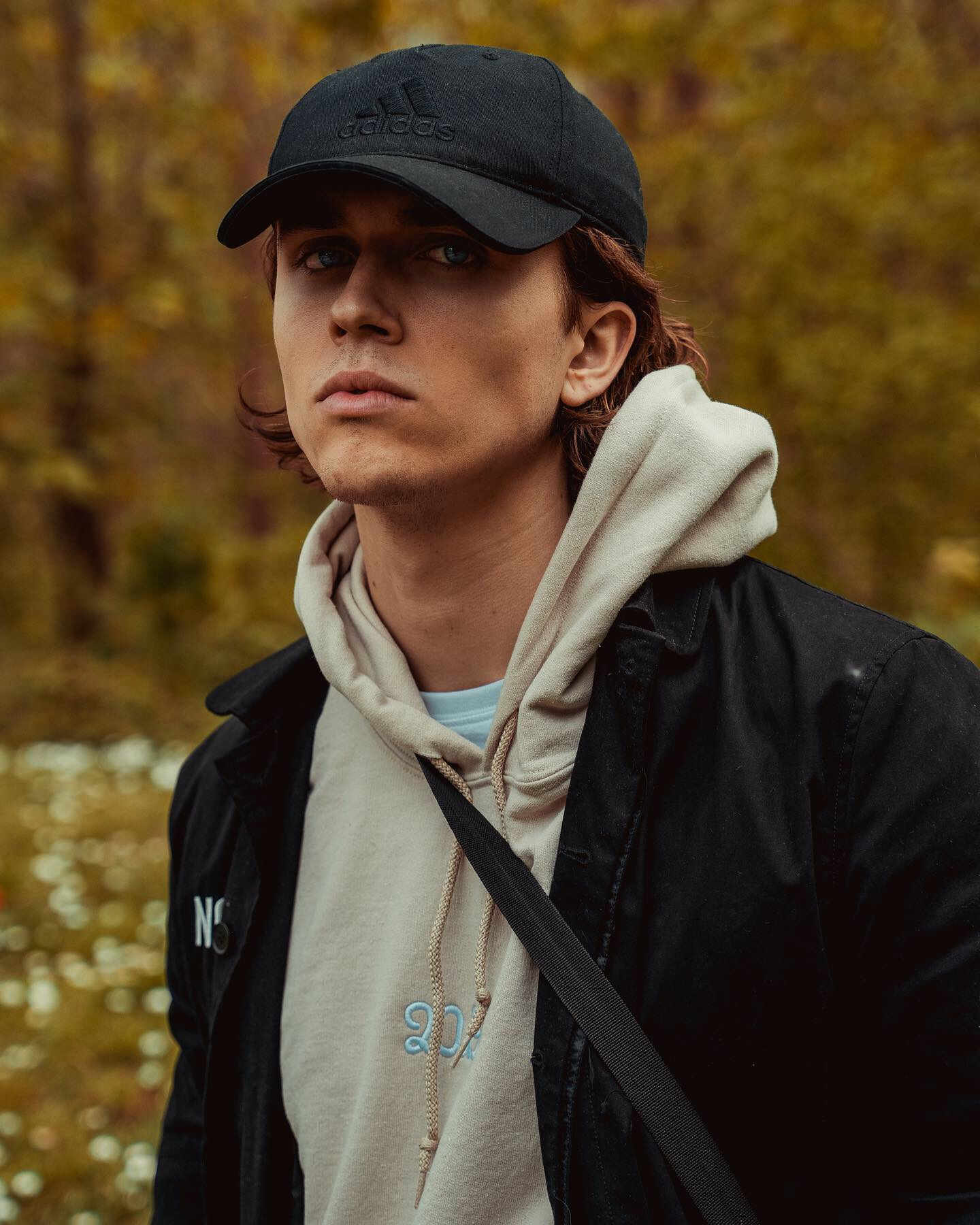
- Ian Thomas in 2019

Background information
- Born: Ian Thomas Hoelen; April 30, 1997 (age 29); Antwerp, Belgium
- Genres: Pop, R&B
- Occupations: Singer-songwriter, model
- Instruments: Vocals, guitar
- Years active: 2011–present
- Label: Unsigned
- Website: ianthomas.be

Ian Thomas Hoelen (born April 30, 1997) is a Belgian singer-songwriter, musician, and model currently based in Antwerp.

== Career ==
=== 2011–13: More Than a Game and Diversity ===
Ian Thomas was discovered in 2011 after the video for his Dutch cover version of Justin Bieber's "Baby" was posted by his parents on YouTube and became a viral sensation. The video came to the attention of Universal Music who subsequently signed a contract with him and the song was released as a single soon afterwards, reaching number 1 in the Ultratop top 10 Flemish Singles Chart.

In 2012 Ian was a model for the Danish fashion brand Outfitters Nation. In 2013 he participated in the reality series De Grote Sprong (the Flemish version of the popular Celebrity Splash! franchise) and came in second place behind former Miss Belgium contestant Tanja Dexters.

=== 2014–present: GameTime ===
Ian was contacted by the record label Island Def Jam after the release of his single "Rain". He subsequently went to Los Angeles to record a music video for "Walking on Air" with Lance Bass and attended the American Music Awards as a special guest of Lance Bass. Ian Thomas also recorded "Money" featuring Qwes Kross with 50/50 Global Muzik Inc. Warner Brothers and Snoop Dogg with Island Def Jam, a song written by the team of Miley Cyrus. The song "Money" was written and produced by M.E. (aka) Jeff Friedland, Chris Hanebutt, Dj IZM Writers: Jeff Friedland, Chris Hanebutt, IZM, T.Coles, Mike Hunnid, Qwes Kross.

"The Way It Feels" is a duet by Ian Thomas and one of his latest, featuring American recording artist Bella Blue. The track appeared on his third studio album, GameTime released in 2014. Written by Gia Sky and Aubrey Wood and produced by Gia Sky, the song was released on July 4, 2014. It is a Pop R&B song, featuring Hip Hop influences.

== Personal life ==
The actor Chris Van Tongelen is his stepfather.

== Awards ==
Year	Nominated	Award	Result
2014	Himself	Joepie: World Conqueror Award	Won
2014	Himself	Joepie: Hottie Of The Year	Won
2015	Himself	Kids Choice Awards Favorite star: The Netherlands and Belgium	Nominated
2016	Himself	Kids Choice Awards Favorite star: Belgium	Nominated

== Discography ==
=== Albums ===
List of studio albums, with selected chart positions
Title	Album details	Peak
Title	Album details	BEL (FL)
More Than a Game	Released: November 11, 2011; Format: CD, digital download; Label: ARS, Universal	6
Diversity	Released: April 26, 2013; Format: CD, digital download; Label: Showfactory	16
Gametime	Released: July 4, 2014; Format: CD, digital download; Label: it Records	13
Make Things Happen	Released: February 19, 2016; Format: CD, digital download; Label: CNR Music	9
"—" denotes releases that did not chart or were not released in that territory.

=== Singles ===
==== Main artist ====
List of singles, with selected chart positions
Title	Year	Peak		Album
Title	Year	BEL (FL)	SPA	Album
"Baby"	2011	15	—	More Than a Game
"Autograph"	2011	30 (Ultratip*)	—	More Than a Game
"You Are the One" (featuring Mello)	2012	61 (Ultratip*)	—	Diversity
"Turn the Tide"	2012	68 (Ultratip*)	—	Diversity
"Lalaland"	2013	26	—	Diversity
"Dancefloor in Five"	2013	53 (Ultratip*)	—	Diversity
"Rain"	2013	10	—	GameTime
"Another Round"	2014	21	—	GameTime
"Slow Down"	2014	8	—	GameTime
"Love X4" (featuring Tiny G)	2014	9	—	GameTime
"Run Away" (featuring Nyanda)	2014	25	28	GameTime
"Cheers" (featuring Tyga)	2015	11	—	Make Things Happen
"Till the Morning" (featuring Flo Rida and LiLana)	2015	42	—	—N/a
"Song for My Dad" (live)	2016	41	—	Make Things Happen
"Envelop Me" (live)	2016	31 (Ultratip*)	—	Make Things Happen
"Females" (live)	2016	—	—	Make Things Happen
"Slaap lekker (Fantastig toch)" (live)	2016	—	—	Make Things Happen
"That Girl Bad"	2016	32 (Ultratip*)	—	Make Things Happen
"Go Wild"	2017	—	—	—N/a
"Molly"	2017	—	—	—N/a
"—" denotes releases that did not chart or were not released in that territory.

*Did not appear in the official Belgian Ultratop 50 charts, but rather in the bubbling under Ultratip charts.

==== Featured artist ====
List of singles, with selected chart positions
Title	Year	Peak	Album
Title	Year	BEL (FL)	Album
"Dans de wereld rond" (Nicole & Hugo featuring Ian Thomas)	2011	117	—N/a
"Walking on Air" (Anise K featuring Ian Thomas, Snoop Dogg, Lance Bass and Bella Blue)	2014	4	—N/a
"Fall in Love" (Dennis featuring Ian Thomas)	2014	124	—N/a
"—" denotes releases that did not chart or were not released in that territory.

== Filmography ==
Television
Year	Title	Role	Notes
2007	Spoed	Tim Van de Vijver	Recurring role (Season 11)
2013	Despicable Me 2	Antonio (voice)	Flemish version
2013	De Grote Sprong	Himself	
2013	Cloudy with a Chance of Meatballs 2	Cal Devereaux (voice)	Flemish version
2015	Kattenoog – Het Geheim van de Griezelclub	Max	
2018	Gert Late Night	Himself	
2018	Dancing with the stars	Himself	
2019	Familie	Elias	
