= Hi-5 (Greek group) =

Greek pop girl group

Background information
- Origin: Cyprus, Greece
- Genres: Pop
- Years active: 2003–2005
- Label: Warner Music Greece
- Past members: Marlain Angelides; Frosso Papacharalambous; Nancy Stergiopoulou; Irini Psixrami; Shaya

Hi-5 was a Greek pop girl group formed in Athens in 2003 through the Greek version of the reality TV show Popstars. The group consisted of Marlain Angelides, Frosso Papacharalambous, Nancy Stergiopoulou, Irini Psixrami and Shaya. The band had a large fanbase in Greece and Cyprus. They disbanded in March 2005.

== History ==
Hi-5 had been created in 2003 and consisted of Marlain Angelides, Frosso Papacharalambous, Nancy Stergiopoulou, Irini Psixrami and Shaya, who were the winners of the Greek version of the popular talent show Popstars. The band released more than five chart-topping singles over the course of one year.

Their debut single "Ksero ti Zitaw" was released by Warner in the spring of 2003 and was later certified gold that June. Hi5 were able to sustain their commercial success by releasing the song "To Tixero Asteri" which also reached the top of the airplay charts. The success of those singles was accompanied by the release of Hi-5's debut self-titled studio album, which also reached number one in Greece, eventually reaching Platinum status for shipments of over 40,000 copies. The longevity of the album in the charts was supported by the commercial success of its third single, "Allo Agapi Ke Allo Sex". In the Christmas season of 2003, the band also released a Christmas album, which was certified Gold partially thanks to the success of its single "Agnosto Paidi Tou Kosmou".

In 2004, the band released their third studio album. The lead single "Genithika Ksana" peaked at number one in the Greek singles chart. The album followed suit, debuting at number one, while going Gold. However, the success of this album was short-lived. Specifically, the band faced a backlash after a live performance during which they were booed. During the same live performance a part of the audience threw yogurt at Hi-5. This event was widely reported by the Greek media. The deteriorating popularity of the band following this event led to numerous fights between the band members, which led to their decisive breakup by the end of 2004.

Furthermore, their song Lathos I Sosto was chosen to be played in the Billboard radio during the summer of 2003. Their third and last studio album, entitled Makria Apo Afti ti Gi, was released in June 2004. Hi-5 disbanded in February 2005, after a fight and the closing down of their record company, the Greek repertoire division of Warner Music Greece.

== Discography ==
Studio albums

- Hi-5 (2003)
- Mia Nichta San ki Afti (2003)
- Makria Apo Afti ti Gi (2004)

CD singles

- "Xero Ti Zitao" (2003)
- "Tichero Asteri" (2003)
- "Allo Agapi Allo Sex/Me Ena Fili" (2003)
- "Agnosto Pedi tou Kosmou" (2003)
- "Gennithika Xana/To Be With You" (2004)
- "Tipota/Skepsou" (2005)

== Awards and nominations ==
| Year | Award | Recipient(s) and nominee(s) | Category | Result |
|---|---|---|---|---|
| 2004 | MAD Video Music Awards | "Ksero Ti Zitao" | Best Pop Video Clip | Nominated |
| 2004 | MAD Video Music Awards | "Ksero Ti Zitao" | Best Video Clip for Group | Won |
| 2004 | MAD Video Music Awards | "Ksero Ti Zitao" | Best Video Clip for Newcomer | Won |
| 2004 | MAD Video Music Awards | Hi-5 | Artist of the Year with the Most Played Video Clip | Nominated |
| 2004 | MAD Video Music Awards | "Allo Agapi Allo Sex" | Best Lyrics That Became Catchphrases | Nominated |
| 2005 | MAD Video Music Awards | "Gennithika Xana" | Best Video Clip for Group | Nominated |
