= Dancing on Ice (Greek TV series) =

- Created by: ITV Studios
- Presented by: Jenny Balatsinou
- Judges: Petros Kostopoulos; Elena Paparizou; Alexis Kostalas
- Country of origin: Greece
- No. of seasons: 1
- No. of episodes: 12

Production
- Production location: Athens
- Running time: approx. 180 to 200 minutes per episode (including commercials)

Original release
- Network: ANT1
- Release: 6 November 2011 – 22 January 2012

Related
- Dancing with the Stars

Dancing on Ice is a Greek reality TV show. The show features celebrities paired with professionals from the world of figure skating. The show is based on the British show, Dancing on Ice. The show has a schedule similar to the reality TV show Dancing with the Stars with performance shows on Sundays nights. Jenny Balatsinou serves as host while Petros Kostopoulos, Elena Paparizou, and Alexis Kostalas serve on the judging panel. The show premiered on 6 November 2011.

== Overview ==
=== Contestants ===
The contestants for the first season were:

Celebrity	Occupation	Professional partner	Status
Vasileios Kostetsos	Fashion designer	Magdalena	Eliminated 1st on 13 November 2011
Maria-Eleni Lukourezou	Music Producer	Jan Moscicki	Withdrew on 13 November 2011
Themis Georgantas	TV presenter	Jennifer	Eliminated 2nd on 20 November 2011
Marianna Kalergi	Muai Thai Athlete	Dima	Eliminated 3rd on 27 November 2011
Pamela	Singer	Jan Moscicki	Eliminated 4th on 4 December 2011
Stamatina Tsimtsili	Television presenter and Television journalist	Gene	Eliminated 5th on 11 December 2011
Christina Papa	Actress- Businesswoman	Anton	Withdrew(injured) on 15 December 2011
Constantinos Christoforou	Singer	Olga	Eliminated 6th on 18 December 2011
Shaya Hansen	Singer	Matteo Zanni	Eliminated 7th on 1 January 2012
Giorgos Cheimonetos	Model	Nicole N. Kennedy	Eliminated 8th on 8 January 2012
Kostas Fragolias	Television presenter and reality TV star	Marina Timofeieva	Third place on 15 January 2012
Penelope Anastasopoulou	Actress and Singer	Alexey Motorin	Runner-up on 22 January 2012
Ioanna Pilixou	Actress	Andrei Bekh	Winner on 22 January 2012

=== Judges' scoring summary ===
Couple	Place	1	2	3	4	5	6	7	8 + 9 = Total	10	11	12
Ioanna & Andrei	1st	11.0	10.5	12.0	11.5	11.5	15.0	14.0	16.5+16.0=32.5	15.5+16.5=32.0	17.5+18.0=35.5	16.5+18.0=34.5
Penelope & Alexey	2nd	11.5	11.0	9.0	13.5	14.0	13.5	15.0	16.0+15.5=31.5	16.0+16.0=32.0	14.5+17.5=32.0	17.0+16.5=33.5
Kostas & Marina	3rd	8.5	8.5	10.0	12.0	12.0	14.5	14.0	14.5+14.0=28.5	13.5+15.0=28.5	16.0+16.5=32.5	
Giorgos & Nicole	4th	8.0	8.5	10.0	9.5	11.0	13.0	12.5	15.0+14.0=29.0	13.0+15.5=28.5		
Shaya & Mateo	5th	12.0	10.5	10.5	12.0	11.5	14.5	15.5	13.0+14.5=27.5			
Konstantinos & Olga	6th	9.5	9.5	8.5	11.0	12.0	11.0	12.0				
Christina & Anton	7th	9.5	8.5	9.0	3.0	12.0	10.5	WD				
Stamatina & Gene	8th	8.5	9.0	9.5	10.0	12.0	11.0					
Pamela & Janek	9th			11.0	12.0	12.5						
Marianna & Dima	10th	10.0	10.0	9.5	10.5							
Themis & Jennifer	11th	8.5	7.0	8.0								
Vassilios & Magdalena	12th	8.5	7.0									
Maria-Eleni & Janek	13th	9.0	WD									

Red numbers indicate the lowest score of the week
Green numbers indicate the highest score of the week
indicates the couple that was in the skate off
indicates the couple that was eliminated
indicates the couple that won
indicates that the couple came in second place
indicates that the couple finished in third place
indicates that a couple withdrew from the competition.

== Average chart ==
Rank by average	Place	Couple	Total	Number of dances	Average
1	1st	Ioanna & Andrei	220.0	15	14.67
2	2nd	Penelope & Alexey	216.5	15	14.43
3	3rd	Kostas & Marina	169.0	13	13.0
4	5th	Shaya & Mateo	114.0	9	12.67
5	9th	Pamela & Janek	35.5	3	11.83
6	4th	Giorgos & Nicole	130.0	11	11.82
7	6th	Konstantinos & Olga	73.5	7	10.5
8	8th	Stamatina & Gene	60	6	10.0
8	10th	Marianna & Dima	40	4	10.0
10	7th	Christina & Anton	59	6	9.83
11	13th	Maria-Eleni & Janek	9.0	1	9.0
12	11th	Themis & Jennifer	23.5	3	7.83
13	12th	Vassilios & Magdalena	15.5	2	7.75

=== Week 1 ===
Individual judges scores in the chart below (given in parentheses) are listed in this order from left to right: Petros Kostopoulos, Elena Paparizou, Alexis Kostalas.

Running order

Couple	Score	Song	Artist
Kostas and Marina	3.0–3.0–2.5	Beat it	Fall out boy
Maria-Eleni and Janek	3.5–3.0–2.5	Let the music play	Barry White
Stamatina and Gene	3.0–3.0–2.5	Ο Βυθός	Μιχάλης Χατζηγιάννης
Giorgos and Nicole	2.5–3.0–2.5	Relax	Frankie goes to Hollywood
Penelope and Alexey	4.0–4.0–3.5	Are you gonna go my way	Lenny Kravitz
Konstantinos and Olga	3.5–3.5–2.5	Σκόνη και θρύψαλλα	Στέφανος Κορκολής
Christina and Anton	3.5–3.0–3.0	Papi	Jennifer Lopez
Marianna and Dima	3.5–3.5–3.0	Born this way	Lady Gaga
Vassilios and Magdalena	3.0–3.0–2.5	Freedom	George Michael
Ioanna and Andrei	3.5–4.0–3.5	Rehab	Amy Winehouse
Themis and Jennifer	3.0–3.0–2.5	Sorry	Madonna
Shaya and Matteo	4.0–4.0–4.0	I will always love you	Whitney Houston

=== Week 2 ===
Individual judges scores in the chart below (given in parentheses) are listed in this order from left to right: Petros Kostopoulos, Elena Paparizou, Alexis Kostalas.

Running order

Couple	Score	Song	Artist
Shaya and Matteo	3.5–3.5–3.5	S&M	Rihanna
Ioanna and Andrei	3.5–3.5–3.5	Rolling in the deep	Adele
Kostas and Marina	3.0–3.0–2.5	Born to be wild	Steppen Wolf
Christina and Anton	3.0–3.0–2.5	Mi sei venutoa cercare tu	Alessandra Amorso
Konstantinos and Olga	3.0–3.5–3.0	Let me entertain you	Robbie Williams
Stamatina and Gene	3.0–3.0–3.0	First be a woman	Leonore O'Malley
Giorgos and Nicole	3.0–3.0–2.5	Unchain my heart	Joe Cocker
Penelope and Alexey	3.5–4.0–3.5	Η αγάπη αργεί	Ελεωνόρα Ζουγανέλη
Themis and Jennifer	2.5–2.5–2.0	DJ got us falling in luv again	Usher
Marianna and Dima	3.5–3.5–3.0	Υπάρχουν στιγμές	Master Tempo ft.Kim
Vassilios and Magdalena	2.5–2.5–2.0	Groove is in the heart	Delight

=== Week 3 ===
Individual judges scores in the chart below (given in parentheses) are listed in this order from left to right: Petros Kostopoulos, Elena Paparizou, Alexis Kostalas.

Running order

Couple	Score	Song	Artist
Marianna and Dima	3.0–3.0–3.5	I gotta feeling	Black Eyed Peas
Konstantinos and Olga	2.5–3.0–3.0	Moves like Jagger	Maroon 5 ft.Christina Aguilera
Penelope and Alexey	3.0–3.5–2.5	Paradise City	Guns n' roses
Shaya and Matteo	3.5–3.5–3.5	Empire state of mind	Alicia Keys
Themis and Jennifer	2.5–3.0–2.5	Όλα γύρω σου γυρίζουν	Σάκης Ρουβάς
Christina and Anton	3.0–3.0–3.0	These boots are for walkin	Nancy Sinatra
Kostas and Marina	3.5–3.5–3.0	You're beautiful	James Blunt
Stamatina and Gene	3.0–3.5–3.0	On the floor	Jennifer Lopez ft.Pitbull
Giorgos and Nicole	3.5–3.5–3.0	In love with you	Jared Evans
Ioanna and Andrei	4.0–4.0–4.0	She	Elvis Costello
Pamela and Janek	4.0–3.5–3.5	Hot n' cold	Katy Perry

=== Week 4 ===
Individual judges scores in the chart below (given in parentheses) are listed in this order from left to right: Petros Kostopoulos, Elena Paparizou, Alexis Kostalas.

Running order

Couple	Score	Song	Artist
Ioanna and Andrei	3.5–4.5–3.5	Rain over me	Pitbull ft.Marc Antony
Giorgos and Nicole	3.5–3.0–3.0	Το παλιό μου παλτό	Χρήστος Δάντης
Pamela and Janek	4.0–4.0–4.0	Total eclipse of heart	Bonnie Tyler
Kostas and Marina	4.0–4.0–4.0	Whole Lotta Love	Led Zeppelin
Stamatina and Gene	3.5–3.5–3.0	Dove L Amore	Cher
Konstantinos and Olga	3.5–4.0–3.5	Show must go on	Queen
Marianna and Dima	3.5–4.0–3.0	I don't wanna miss a thing	Aerosmith
Shaya and Matteo	4.5–4.0–3.5	You and your hand	Pink
Christina and Anton	3.0–3.5–3.0	Είναι στιγμές	Αντώνης Ρέμος
Penelope and Alexey	4.5–4.5–4.5	Caruso	Luciano Pavarotti

=== Week 5 ===
Individual judges scores in the chart below (given in parentheses) are listed in this order from left to right: Petros Kostopoulos, Elena Paparizou, Alexis Kostalas.

Running order

Couple	Score	Song	Artist
Pamela and Janek	4.0–4.5–4.0	Fame	Irene Cara
Penelope and Alexey	4.5–5.0–4.0	Lady Marmelade	Christina Aguilera-Lil' Kim-Mýa-Pink
Kostas and Marina	4.0–4.5–3.5	Footloose	Kenny Loggins
Shaya and Matteo	4.0–4.0–3.5	Dark Moon	Paul Mottram
Konstantinos and Olga	4.0–4.0–4.0	Rock around the clock	Bill Haley
Ioanna and Andrei	4.0–4.0–3.5	Against all odds	Phil Collins
Christina and Anton	4.0–4.0–4.0	Mamma Mia	Abba
Giorgos and Nicole	3.5–4.0–3.5	James Bond Theme Song	
Stamatina and Gene	4.0–4.0–4.0	My heart will go on	Celine Dion

=== Week 6 ===
Individual judges scores in the chart below (given in parentheses) are listed in this order from left to right: Petros Kostopoulos, Elena Paparizou, Alexis Kostalas.

Running order

Couple	Score	Song	Artist
Christina and Anton	3.5–3.5–3.5	Λάμπω	Άννα Βίσση
Konstantinos and Olga	4.0–3.5–3.5	Strangers in the night	Frank Sinatra
Stamatina and Gene	4.0–3.5–3.5	Material Girl	Madonna
Giorgos and Nicole	4.5–4.5–4.0	Impossible	Daniel Merriweather
Shaya and Matteo	5.0–5.0–4.5	I'm so excited	Pointer Sisters
Penelope and Alexey	4.5–5.0–4.0	Set fire to the rain	Adele
Kostas and Marina	5.0–5.0–4.5	What about now	Westlife
Ioanna and Andrei	5.0–5.0–5.0	Total eclipse	Klaus Nomi

=== Week 7 ===
Individual judges scores in the chart below (given in parentheses) are listed in this order from left to right: Petros Kostopoulos, Elena Paparizou, Alexis Kostalas.

Running order

Couple	Score	Song	Artist
Penelope and Alexey	5.0–5.0–5.0	I kissed a girl	Katy Perry
Giorgos and Nicole	4.0–4.0–4.5	Tainted Love	Scorpions
Ioanna and Andrei	4.5–5.0–4.5	Mad about the boy	Dinah Washington
Konstantinos and Olga	4.0–4.0–4.0	Κάνε να μην σ'αγαπήσω	Σάκης Ρουβάς
Shaya and Matteo	5.0–5.5–5.0	Frozen	Madonna
Kostas and Marina	4.5–5.0–4.5	Wild Boys	Duran-Duran

=== Week 8 ===
Individual judges scores in the chart below (given in parentheses) are listed in this order from left to right: Petros Kostopoulos, Elena Paparizou, Alexis Kostalas.

Running order

Couple	Score	Song	Artist
Shaya and Matteo	4.5–4.5–4.0	Santa Baby	Pussycat Dolls
Kostas and Marina	5.0–5.0–4.5	Χριστούγεννα	Δέσποινα Βανδή
Penelope and Alexey	5.5–5.5–5.0	Jingle Bells	Sex Pistols
Giorgos and Nicole	5.0–5.0–5.0	Let it snow	Frank Sinatra
Ioanna and Andrei	5.5–5.5–5.5	Home for Christmas	Maria Mena

=== Week 9 ===
Individual judges scores in the chart below (given in parentheses) are listed in this order from left to right: Petros Kostopoulos, Elena Paparizou, Alexis Kostalas.

Running order

Couple	Score	Song	Artist
Kostas and Marina	4.5–5.0–4.5	Beautiful Day	U2
Ioanna and Andrei	5.5–5.5–5.0	Je veux	Zaz
Giorgos and Nicole	4.5–5.0–4.5	Χαμογέλα	Σάκης Ρουβάς
Penelope and Alexey	5.0–5.5–5.0	Φίλα με ακόμα	Πάνος Μουζουράκης-Κωστής Μαραβέγιας
Shaya and Matteo	5.0–5.0–4.5	Imagine	Thaio Cruz

=== Week 10 ===
Individual judges scores in the chart below (given in parentheses) are listed in this order from left to right: Petros Kostopoulos, Elena Paparizou, Alexis Kostalas.

Running order

Couple	Score	Song	Artist
Giorgos and Nicole	4.0–4.5–4.5	Dance with somebody	Mando Diao
Ioanna and Andrei	5.0–5.5–5.0	Στην ντισκοτέκ	Ελπίδα-Ημισκούμπρια
Penelope and Alexey	5.5–5.5–5.0	Non ti scordar mai di me	Guissy Ferreri
Kostas and Marina	4.5–4.5–4.5	Ο χαμένος θησαυρός	Onirama
Giorgos and Nicole	5.0–5.5–5.0	H νύχτα δύο κομμάτια	Αντώνης Ρέμος
Ioanna and Andrei	5.5–5.5–5.5	Feeling Good	Muse
Penelope and Alexey	5.5–5.5–5.0	Μου αρέσουν τα αγόρια	Αλίκη Βουγιουκλάκη
Kostas and Marina	5.0–5.0–5.0	Whataya want from me	Adam Lambert

=== Semi-final ===
Individual judges scores in the chart below (given in parentheses) are listed in this order from left to right: Petros Kostopoulos, Elena Paparizou, Alexis Kostalas.

Running order

Couple	Score	Song	Artist
Penelope and Alexey	5.0–5.0–4.5	Sweet Child O'Mine	Guns n' roses
Kostas and Marina	5.5–5.5–5.0	Nessun Dorma	Paul Potts
Ioanna and Andrei	6.0–6.0–5.5	Fallin	Alicia Keys
Penelope and Alexey	6.0–6.0–5.5	Για σένα	Vegas
Kostas and Marina	5.5–5.5–5.5	Without you	David Guetta feat Usher
Ioanna and Andrei	6.0–6.0–6.0	Oops!I did it again	Max Raabe

=== Final ===
Individual judges scores in the chart below (given in parentheses) are listed in this order from left to right: Petros Kostopoulos, Elena Paparizou, Alexis Kostalas.

Running order

Couple	Score	Song	Artist
Ioanna and Andrei	5.5–5.5–5.5	Total eclipse	Klaus Nomi
Penelope and Alexey	5.5–6.0–5.5	Caruso	Luciano Pavarotti
Ioanna and Andrei	6.0–6.0–6.0	One night only	Jennifer Hudson
Penelope and Alexey	5.5–5.5–5.5	So What	Pink
Ioanna and Andrei vs Penelope and Alexey	No points	Αν ήσουν αγάπη	Έλενα Παπαρίζου

== Element of the week ==
Week	Element
1	–
2	Spiral
3	Shoot the duck
4	Cross Cuts
5	Step Sequence
6	Pair Spin
7	Stop Sequence
8	Twizzle
9	Spin
10	Jumps
11	Side by side steps
12	–

== Reception ==
As a spin-off of the successful Dancing with the Stars franchise and the replacement for The X Factor as ANT1's leading reality show competition for the winter season, the program was anticipated. Although the premiere episode was broadcast over an hour and a half late due to the ongoing political debate between Prime Minister George Papandreou and opposition leader Antonis Samaras for a coalition government in the nation, it managed to attain 36.8 per cent of the overall ratings share and 40.9 percent in the 15–44 demographic. Despite this, the program has been critically panned. Critics generally found the show to be boring, the production low budget, and the concept irrelevant to the interests of Greek culture, where figure skating is obscure. Kosmas Vidos of To Vima wrote the show lacked entertainment value because although most of the celebrities gave decent performances, they were more concerned with not falling rather than dancing as had been advertised, "even though the thing that was most obvious was the effect of the economic crisis on television networks: extremely poor was the whole production, the lighting amateur, and the direction below average [with] a deep sense of boredom, dominating a competition where the goal was fun and joy." The show has in particular been compared negatively to its counterpart, Dancing with the Stars. Giannis Melas of NewsIt acknowledged the difficulty of the sport but ultimately felt that the low quality performances contributed to the overall "frigid" and "boring" ambience, while adding that several of the celebrities had not made strong enough attempts to learn what was required. He added that Dancing on Ice has a strong advantage in the ratings because its Sunday nine o'clock time slot faces virtually no competition. Nevertheless, he predicted that the next few episodes would be paramount to the show's success as "if it continues to be so ... boring probably the viewers will freeze it!"

Apart from being delayed, the premiere faced technical difficulties with the computers, which on multiple occasions attributed wrong scores to judges, while one of the professional skaters fell within the first moments of the show.

Host Jenny Balatsinou was described as "ultra sleek". Typically giving the lowest scores, Kostalas has been described as the tough judge. Melas commented that judges Alexis Kostalas and Petros Kostopoulos did not entice audiences with their characters, with the former speaking exclusively objectively and the latter "with his signature glibness for one more time in a judging panel without differentiating in anything from the last times." Alternately, he commended Elena Paparizou's television debut as a highlight on the show because "she demonstrated that she has reason and can stand worthily in her place. Comfortable, with humour, she gave appropriate critique to the contestants and even made fun of her own mistakes in Greek." Paparizou, who was born and raised in Sweden, expressed concern about her Greek on the show. Because of her malapropisms on the premiere, host Balatsinou dubbed her television's new George Levendis, the Greek-Australian X Factor judge, known for his own collection of poorly-phrased quotes.
