= Walter Baele =

Belgian actor

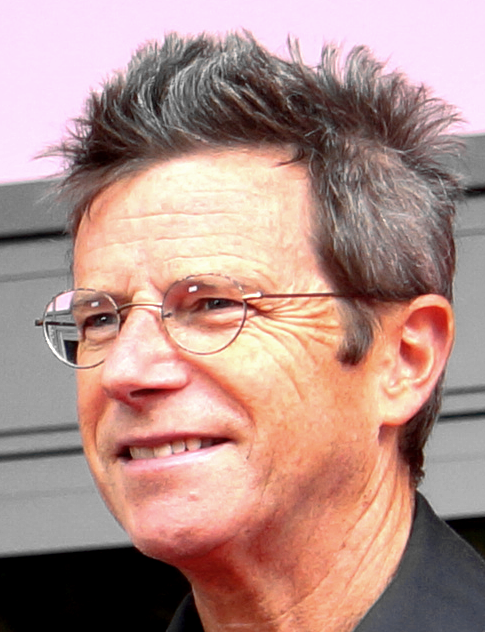

Walter Baele (born 16 May 1964 in Waregem) is a Flemish cabaretier and actor, best known for creating characters.

== Television acts ==
- Marcel de Neudt in Familie Backeljau
- Jacky Lebot in U Hoort Nog Van Ons
- Rosa Vermeulen in Rosa
- Wito, de reggaeman in Dilemma
- As newsreporter in Brussel Nieuwsstraat
  - André van Superette André in Brussel Nieuwsstraat.
  - The man from Zwijnaarde
- Eugène Van Leemhuyzen in Samson en Gert
- Jürgen van Moerseek, the homosexual musical wonder
- Serafino De Sluwe in Mega Mindy
- Prins Filip in Wij van België

== Theater ==
- Als... (1986) selected for the Camerettenfestival and the Wim Sonneveldprijs.
- De Frits Fricket show (1991–1992) winner of Humorologieprijs in Marke.
- Wie heeft Martin en Yourki gezien? (1993–1994)
- Martha (1994–1995)
- Waarom rudy? Waarom? (1997–1998)
- Wortels (1999) Later it became a play.
- Alle 10 goed (2003–2004)
- Veel tralala (2005–2006)
- Janssen in the musical Kuifje (2007)
- Lars, Goeroe, Ayoub, tv host en burgerlijk ingenieur in Baas boven baas (Kiekeboe) (2007)
- vRRiesman (2009–2010)
- Sir Lancelot in the musical Spamalot (2011)

== Family ==
Walter Baele is married to photographer Pascale Van den Broek. He has one child.
