= Samson en Gert =

Flemish children's television series

- Samson en Gert (1990–2017)
- Created by: Gert Verhulst; Danny Verbiest; Hans Bourlon
- Directed by: Bart Van Leemputten
- Starring: Gert Verhulst; Ewald De Haas; Peter Thyssen and others
- Country of origin: Belgium
- Original language: Dutch
- No. of seasons: 18
- No. of episodes: 797

Production
- Running time: 20–25 minutes
- Production company: Studio 100

Original release
- Release: 2 September 1990 – 15 April 2017

Samson & Gert is a Flemish children's television series, centered on the talking dog Samson and his owner Gert. In its entire run, the show was originally aired on TV1 from Christmas Day 1989 until 1 December 1997, where it moved to Ketnet and continues airing all of its episodes to this day.

== History ==
Originally Gert Verhulst was a continuity announcer. He wanted to make the announcements before children's television programmes more appealing by having an animal puppet next to him. He got in touch with puppeteer Danny Verbiest, who created the puppet dog Samson, a Bearded Collie, who made a screen debut in the Christmas period of 1989.

The pair's popularity grew rapidly in Flanders and they were given their own television series named Samson, which premiered on 2 September 1990. During the show, Samson and Gert and their friends would encounter many funny and chaotic situations. The plot would be interrupted for contests, fan mail and a variety of cartoons, such as Tom and Jerry, The Smurfs, Ovide and the Gang, and Mrs. Pepper Pot.

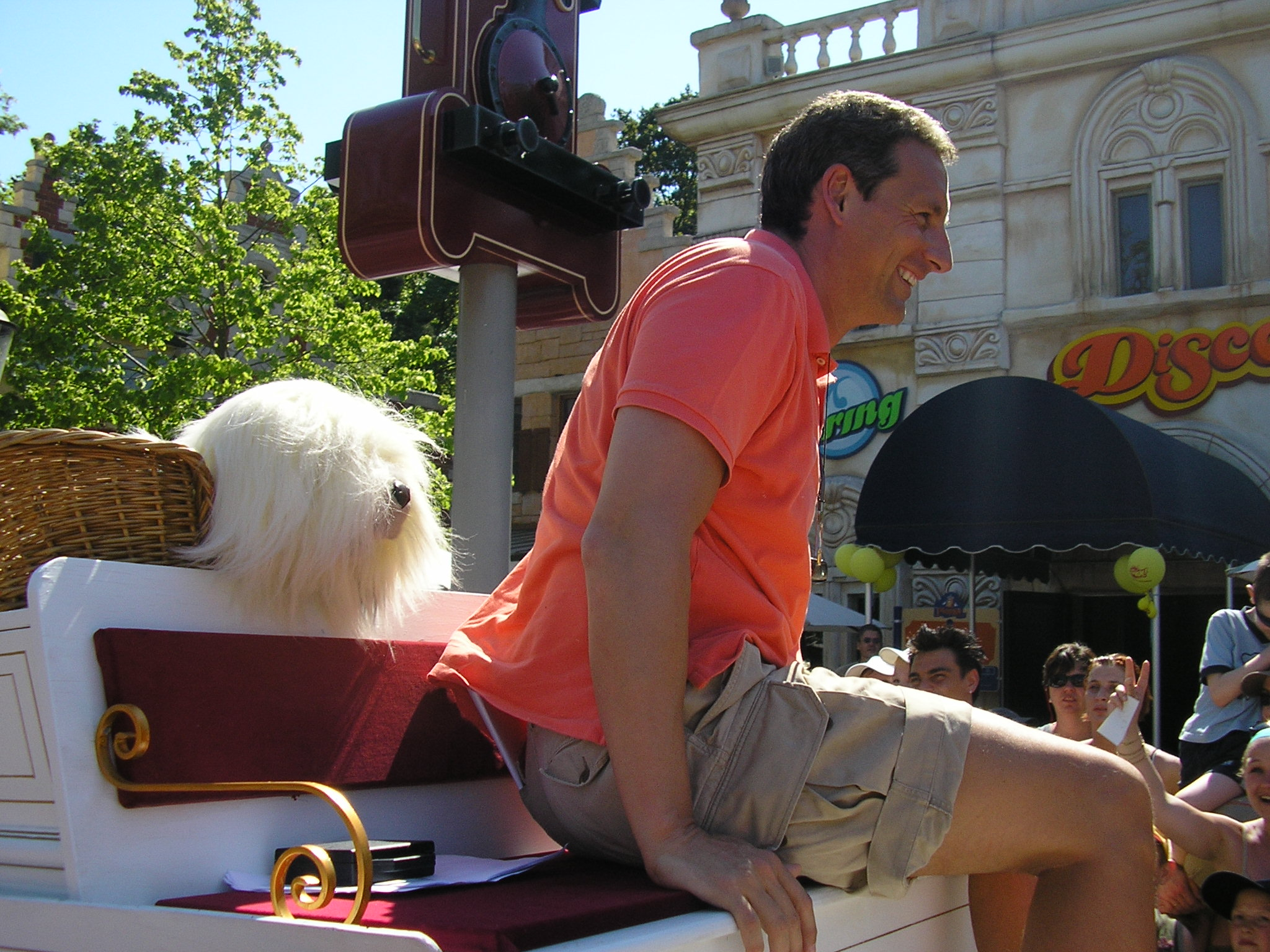
Samson together with Gert in the theme park Plopsaland in 2006

The production of new episodes ceased in 2005, but the series is still broadcast in Flanders and the Netherlands and is popular with children. Danny Verbiest also retired in 2005. Many fans were upset by this, as they believed that Danny Verbiest gave a unique and specific voice to Samson. Peter Thyssen took over his role. Even though episodes were no longer being produced, many theater shows and songs continued to be made, with the annual Kerstshows or Christmas shows every winter being the most prominent.

In 2014 Peter Thyssen stopped portraying Samson and Dirk Bosschaert took over. In the same year, after 10 years of absence, they produced a brand new season, called 'Winterpret'. It took place in three bungalows in the Ardennes during the winter. The characters of Gert, Samson, the mayor, Van Leemhuyzen and Alberto returned. The main set was the bungalow of Samson & Gert, which had the same layout as their house. In 2017 they produced another special season, called 'Zomerpret' with a summer theme. The previous cast of 'Winterpret' re-appeared and a new character was introduced, 'Jaap Mengelmoes', who was the owner of the camping where Samson & Gert would stay in. Jaap Mengelmoes also happened to be the cousin of former neighbour Joop Mengelmoes.

Samson and Gert's first film, Hotel op Stelten ("Panic in the Hotel"), premiered on 12 March 2008. It also stars their friends Alberto, Octaaf, the mayor and Van Leemhuyzen.

Gert Verhulst intended to retire from the role at their 30th anniversary, leaving Samson in need of a new owner. At the first performance of their farewell tour in December 2019, it was revealed that this role will be fulfilled by Marie Verhulst (the daughter of Gert). The final performance was initially planned for 19 April 2020, but as COVID-19 pandemic hit in March, the rest of the tour was postponed for two years. Gert's last performance took place on 16 April 2022, finally saying goodbye to his role after 32 years.

Samson en Marie (2020–present)

The new show is called Samson and Marie. While Gert is no longer present, the mayor, Van Leemhuyzen and Alberto still appear in the new show from time to time. They also appeared in the first Samson & Marie Christmas show.

== Concept and characters ==
Samson is a sweet naive Bearded Collie who can speak but consistently mispronounces certain words and cannot get names right. His best friend is his owner Gert. Samson is in love with Bobientje, another Bearded Collie, and Gert is in love with Marlène. Bobientje and Marlène are both unseen characters, but are mentioned in almost every episode.

The show features many running jokes. For example, their neighbour, Joop Mengelmoes, broke their doorbell in the very first episode; following this every visitor now enters the house with the catchphrase "Ik moest kloppen, want de bel doet het niet" ("I had to knock because the doorbell is broken").

The village mayor, Modest, seems more interested in model aircraft than in his work as mayor. He always makes the same speech: "To those who are present: congratulations! To those who are absent: congratulations as well!". He is assisted by his playful and hyperactive secretary Eugène Van Leemhuyzen. The minister's delegate regularly pays a visit to the town, but his visits always occur at the worst possible time.

The local grocery store is run by Octaaf De Bolle and his overbearing mother Jeannine. Octaaf is extremely conceited and vain, but in reality he is nothing but a bungler. He is the president of the local gymnastics club and he thinks of himself as an athlete. He also has a teenage daughter, Miranda. His mother Jeannine is the proud president of the local crafts club. Just like her son, Jeannine is not afraid to brag.

The town's best (and only) hairdresser is Albert Vermeersch. He does not get many customers, so he eats a lot to pass the time. Aside from eating, Albert enjoys singing and is an active participant in the local opera company, although the others don't like his singing. He wants to be called "Alberto Vermicelli", because this name fits him more as an opera singer. Gert still calls him by his real name, which always annoys him. Since Samson can't pronounce "vermicelli", he just calls him "Mr. Spaghetti". Although it was never revealed in the series, Albert is seen as a homosexual by the audience. In 2009, actor Koen Crucke, who played the role, told the Belgian newspaper Het Nieuwsblad that Albert is based upon the role of the gay hairdresser he played in the film Koko Flanel but does not reveal anything about the sexual orientation of Albert.

As in every Belgian village, there is a friture (chip shop). The owner of the friture, Fred Kroket, is an unseen character who tries to sell jars of mayonnaise and pickles by phone. He retired from business in 2001, after which his cousin Frieda took over. Frieda immediately fell in love with Albert, but her love remained unrequited.

All characters have multiple recognizable catchphrases. Octaaf's most famous catchphrase is: "This happens to be one of my specialties. My Miranda always says that too. 'Dad', she says, 'the way you [...], well... that way I [...]."

== Cast overview ==
Character name	Portrayed by	Time date
Samson	Danny Verbiest; Peter Thyssen; Dirk Bosschaert	1989 - 2005; 2005 - 2013; 2013–2017
Gert	Gert Verhulst	1989–2017
Joop Mengelmoes	Stef Bos	1990 - 1991
Albert Vermeersch	Koen Crucke	1990–2006, 2008–2017
"Mr. Mayor" Modest	Walter De Donder	1990–2017
Octaaf De Bolle	Walter Van De Velde	1992 - 2002, 2008, 2017
Miranda De Bolle	Liesbet Verstraeten	1992 - 1993
Jeannine De Bolle	Ann Petersen ^{†}	1994 - 1999
Sofie	Evi Hanssen	1994 - 1995
Eugène Van Leemhuyzen	Walter Baele	1998–2017
Minister's delegate	Hans Royaards	1999 – 2013
Frieda Kroket	Barbara De Jonge	2000 - 2003
Minister	Luc Meirte	2003 - 2005
Jaap Mengelmoes	Marc-Marie Huijbregts	2017

A couple of characters are often mentioned but never shown on screen: Fred Kroket, Albert's mother and uncle, Gert's love rival Jean-Louis Michel and the mayor's housekeeper Marie. After Ann Petersen and Walter Van De Velde left the series, their characters Jeannine and Octaaf became unseen characters as well. Van De Velde reprised his role as Octaaf one final time in the film. Eugène Van Leemhuyzen was an unseen character before he debuted on the show in 1998.

== Other activities ==
=== Music ===
Samson and Gert released their first CD in March 1991. 16 CDs have been released since.

=== Theater shows ===
Since 1991, Samson and Gert have hosted an annual theater show during the Christmas and New Year holiday period, the Samson & Gert Christmas Show. During these theater shows, Samson and Gert perform their most popular songs while their friends try to entertain the audience. Even though no new episodes have been produced since 2005, the theater shows are still being held each year.

From 1991 to 1999, Samson and Gert also went on a theater tour during the summer season, touring Flanders in a circus tent. The summer shows have been held in Plopsaland since the theme park opened in 2000.

=== Comics ===
From 1993 to 2005 a comics series was launched. It was written by Danny Verbiest, Gert Verhulst and Hans Bourlon, while the stories were drawn by Jean-Pol, Luc Morjaeu, Wim Swerts and Bruno De Roover. The series was notable for giving some of the unseen characters in the TV series a visual appearance. 33 albums were published.

=== Software ===
Several interactive CD-ROM adventures were developed for Mac and Windows, all developed by Stefan Bracke, among them "Op reis with Samson & Gert".

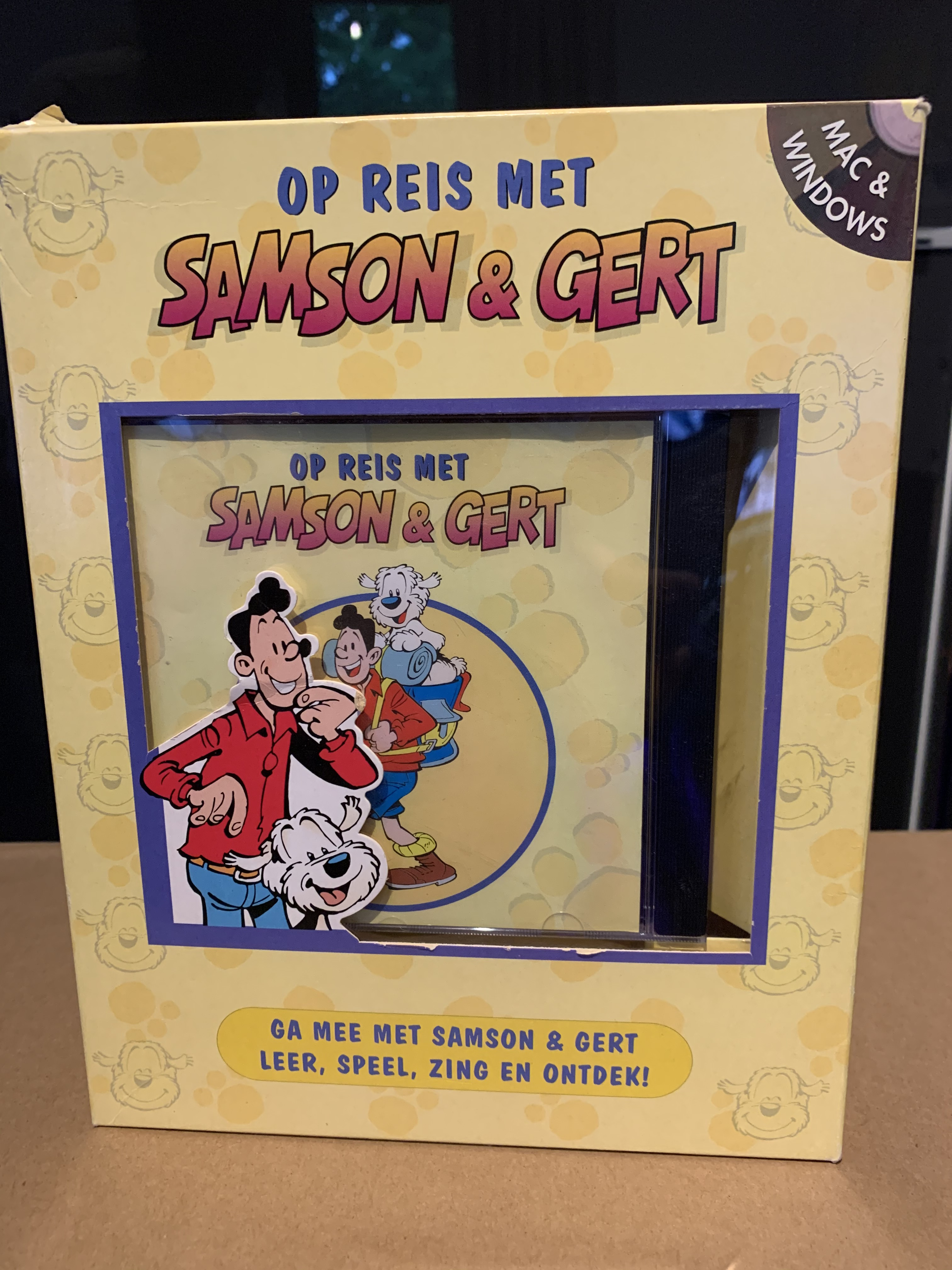
Op reis met Gert en Samson

=== Film ===
Samson and Gert's first film, Hotel op Stelten (Panic at the Hotel), premiered on 12 March 2008. It features their friends Alberto, Octaaf, mayor Modest and Eugène. The plot focuses on an abandoned hotel owned by the family of Marlène. The building, being in bad repair, has to be demolished to make room for a high-rise building. Gert, who will do everything for his love, offers Marlène his help to rescue the hotel. The government allows Gert and his friends one week to restore the building and save it from demolition. Naturally the film is full of silly situations. Then there is the story of the two thieves. When Gert was a little boy, he played a lot with Marlène at the hotel which was still in use. At one day, two thieves had to hide a way from the police because they had stolen a very expensive diamond. They put the diamond away in a ball in the basement and ran off but got caught anyway. When they heard that the hotel was opened again during restoration for a test-public, they escaped from prison and dressed themselves as a couple to enter the hotel. The police started looking for them and informed Gert and Samson. After a long time, Gert realized that the strange couple were the two thieves. Because of this, the government gave the permission to keep the hotel, and financed the rest of the restoration.

=== French-language version ===
A French-language adaptation, Fred et Samson, started in 2007 on Club RTL.

Samson and Fred started with shorts as hosts of Plopsa TV from 2007 to 2011, replaced by Club Studio 100. After that series ended, Fred and Samson were given a longer show, Le grenier de Fred & Samson.

Fred is interpreted by Tristan Moreau, who pushed the production to be more original and adapted to the Francophone culture and continues to work in French-language activities for Studio 100, and Fred and Samson make theater shows and to Plopsaland too.

In 2020, Fred and Samson returned with Fred et Samson en vadrouille for Studio 100 TV. In the new series, they travel through the countryside in a small van, based on Samson en Marie.
