= Anise K =

- Born: Anise Arsalon Khoshmashrab; 20 February 1985 (age 41)
- Origin: Melbourne, Victoria, Australia
- Genres: Pop
- Occupations: Producer, songwriter, singer
- Years active: 2011–present
- Labels: Sony Music Australia, Cobalt Music Group, Warner Music Group
- Website: anisekmanagement.com

Anise Arsalon Khoshmashrab (born 20 February 1985) is an Australian "recording artist", record producer, and songwriter known by their stage name Anise K. In 2012 they was signed to Sony Music Australia, and later in 2014 signed with Cobalt Music (formerly Universal Music Group Greece) and Warner Music Group.

== 1985–2011: Early life and career beginnings ==
Anise K was born on 20 February 1985 in Melbourne, Victoria, Australia, to parents Behzad and Pari Khoshmashrab, followers of the Baháʼí Faith. From a young age, Anise demonstrated a keen sense and interest for music. They played alongside their father, Behzad Khoshmashrab, in many community events and fundraisers. A number of CDs have been released featuring Anise and their father often playing International and Baha'i music. Anise has been involved in many local, national and international events.

Their professional breakthrough occurred in 2006 when Anise moved to Los Angeles and was working alongside the Three time Grammy Award winning producer KC Porter. In 2007 Anise flew to Miami to meet with Bruno Del Granado (Ricky Martin's business manager) to start working on Ricky Martin concert licensing in Australasia. In June 2011 Anise K released their debut single "I Feel Good" co-produced by ARIA Award winning producer, Audius Mtawarira. The song's success lead to a viral video by Keenan Cahill.

== 2012 – present ==
In January 2012, Anise K signed with manager, Jamie C. Huber (Hype33 Entertainment) to manage their solo career. It was shortly after in July 2012 Anise was signed to Sony Music Australia just after they had finished recording his second single "Walking on Air"."Walking on Air" was written by Anise K and KC Porter, and the rap section was written by Snoop Dogg. The single features international renowned hip/hop artist Snoop Dogg and upcoming artist Bella Blue. Some of the biggest names in the music industry have been involved in the development of the single including Phil Tan as mixing engineer and producer KC Porter. The music video was filmed on a Dry Lake Bed just outside Las Vegas, Nevada and Sydney, Australia. The single was due for release on 14 December 2012.

"Walking on Air" has been a huge hit in Greece in 2013. The song climbed to No.1 on the international airplay chart in Greece and in the Top 5 of the official airplay chart. It has reached #1 on both official iTunes chart and dance iTunes chart in Greece. "Walking on Air" was the No. 1 international track on the airplay chart of Greece for 2013. The song also peaked at No. 1 in the USA Billboard chart.

In 2021 Anise K co-produced and also has writing credits for KDDO & Davido song, Beamer Body, featuring Afrobeats and African musical themes and style in KDDO's debut EP, TOO LATE TOO LIT.
