= Koen Crucke =

Belgian opera singer and actor

Koen Crucke singing in 2026

Koenraad Desiré Arthur (Koen) Crucke (born 11 February 1952 in Ghent) is a Belgian operatic tenor, politician, and actor of stage, television, and film. As an opera singer he has been particularly active at the Vlaamse Opera in Antwerp where he specializes in character roles. He has appeared in numerous musical theatre productions as well. Since 1990, he stars as Albert 'Alberto Vermicelli' Vermeersch on the long-running Flemish-Belgian children's television series Samson en Gert. In 2009, Crucke told the Belgian newspaper Het Nieuwsblad, Albert is based upon the role of the gay hairdresser, he played in the movie Koko Flanel but does not reveal anything about the sexual orientation of Albert.

== Filmography ==
=== Films ===
Film
Year	Title	Role	Notes
1984	Zware jongens	Gevangene Caruso	
1986	De Paniekzaaiers	Orkestleider	
1989	Blueberry Hill	Barkeeper Milord	Directed by Robbe De Hert
1989	Het sacrament	(Unnamed role)	
1990	Koko Flanel	Jean-Claude	
1991	Samson & Gert: Er zit meer in een liedje	Albert 'Alberto Vermicelli' Vermeersch	(Video short)
2001	Pauline and Paulette	De 'graaf'	
2001	Robin Hood: The Musical	Koning Jan	(Video)
2002	Doornroosje, de musical	Koning Lodewijk	(Video)
2008	Hotel op stelten (Panic at the Hotel)	Albert 'Alberto Vermicelli' Vermeersch	Samson & Gert children's film
2011	Alice in Wonderland, de musical	De Hoedenmaker / De Rups	(Video)
2012	Musical: Robin Hood	Koning Jan	(Video)
2014	K3 Dierenhotel	Lazy (voice role)	

=== TV ===
Television
Year	Title	Role	Notes
1977	De eerste nowel	Derde Herder	(TV Movie)
1978	The van Paemel Family	Désiré	(TV Movie)
1990	Langs de kade	(Unnamed role)	(TV Series), 1 episode: "De Hormonendealer"
1990	Meester, hij begint weer!	Leerkracht / Leraar	(TV Series), 4 episodes: "De Stagiaire", "De Inspecteur", "Buys Op De Buis" and "Buys En De Baby"
1991-2019	Samson en Gert	Albert 'Alberto Vermicelli' Vermeersch	(Children's TV Series), 525 episodes
1993	Zomerrust	Alfons	(TV Series), 1 episode: "The Way to Your Heart"
2000-2002	Brussel Nieuwsstraat (or Brussels New Street)	(TV Series), 14 episodes	
2009	Super8	Koen Krucke	(TV Series), 1 episode
2019	Samson & Gert: Het allerlaatste liedje	Albert 'Alberto Vermicelli' Vermeersch	(TV Movie / Video )
2020 - onwards	Samson en Marie	Albert 'Alberto Vermicelli' Vermeersch	(TV Series), 6 episodes

== Personal life ==
In 2004 he married his long-time partner; becoming one of the first Belgian celebrities to take advantage of the newly established Same-sex marriage laws in Belgium.
