= List of Turkish Belgians =

This is a list of notable Belgian Turks.

== Academia ==
- Mateo Alaluf, professor of sociology at the Université Libre de Bruxelles.
- Yasemin Arda, management scientist
- Koray Konuk, researcher in archaeology at the Centre National de la Recherche Scientifique

== Arts and literature ==
- Anthony Asael, international photographer
- Kenan Görgün, writer.
- Mahmut Karadağ, fashion designer
- Bahar Kimyongür, writer and activist
- Mehmet Koksal, journalist.
- Fatma Taspinar, journalist.

== Business ==
- Şefik Birkiye, architect and founder of Vizzion Architects and Vizzion Europe.

== Cinema and television ==
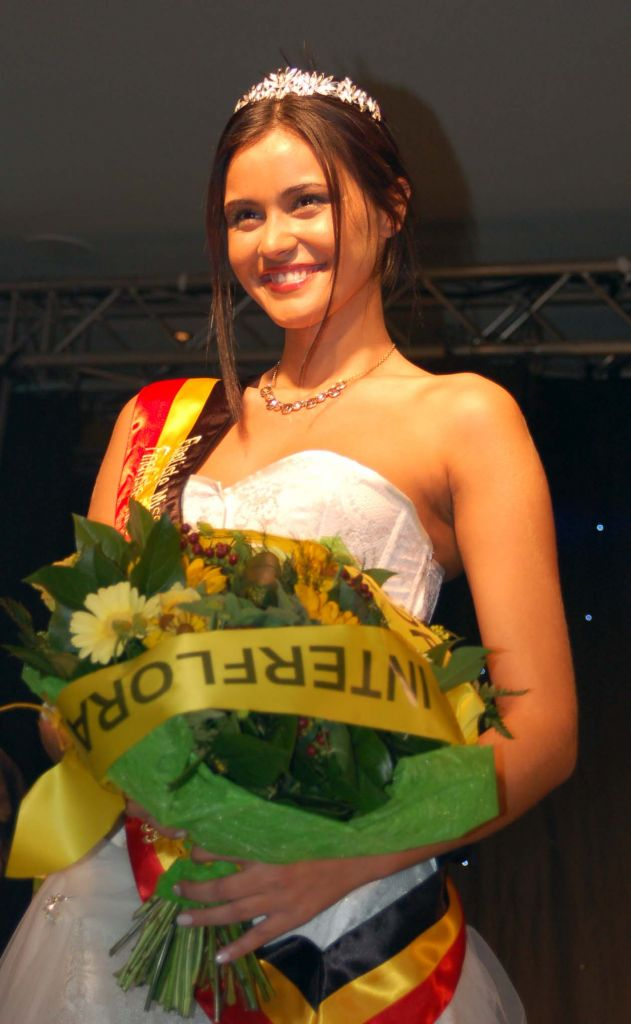
Zeynep Sever, Miss Belgium 2009.

- Cem Akkanat, actor
- R. Kan Albay, film director
- Erol Altunbay, film producer
- Sahin Avci, actor
- Kadir Balci,, director
- Gökhan Girginol, actor
- Kadèr Gürbüz, actress and TV presenter
- Öznur Karaca,, comedian
- Hande Kodja, actress
- Gönül Meral, Miss Hainaut (2013)
- Faroek Özgünes, TV presenter
- Zeynep Sever, winner of Miss Belgium 2009
- Aylin Yay, actress

== Music ==
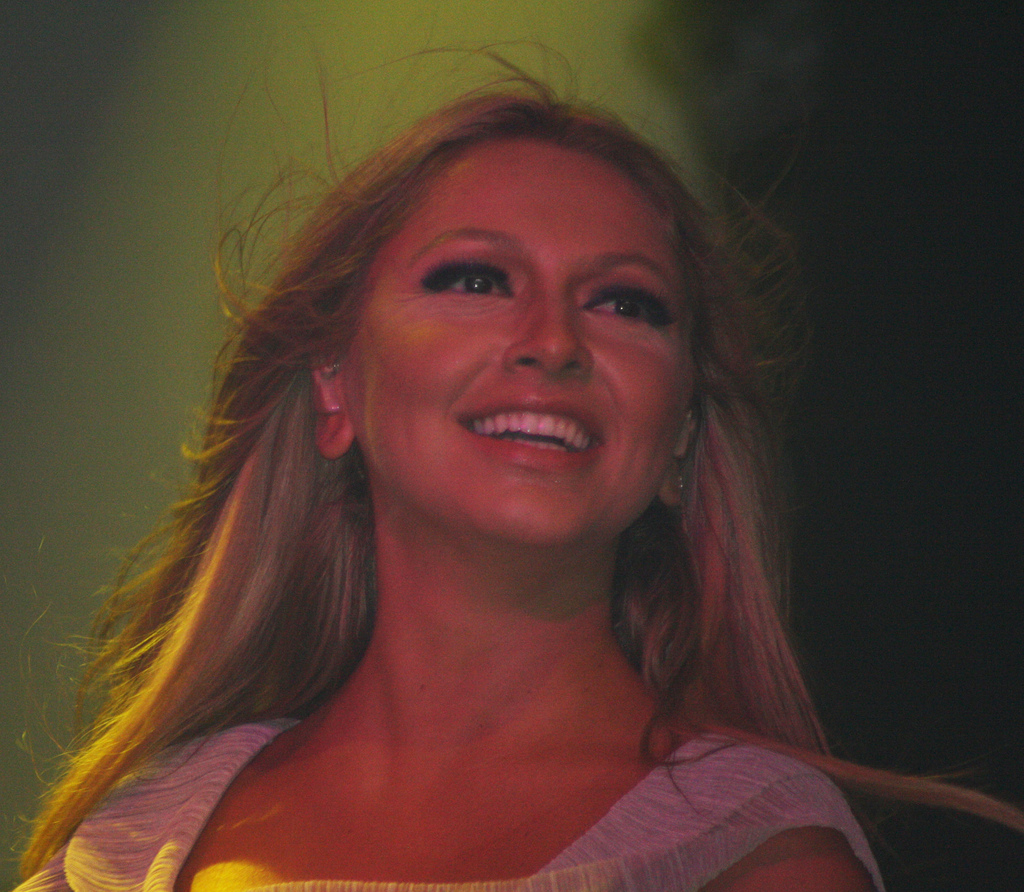
Hadise, singer.

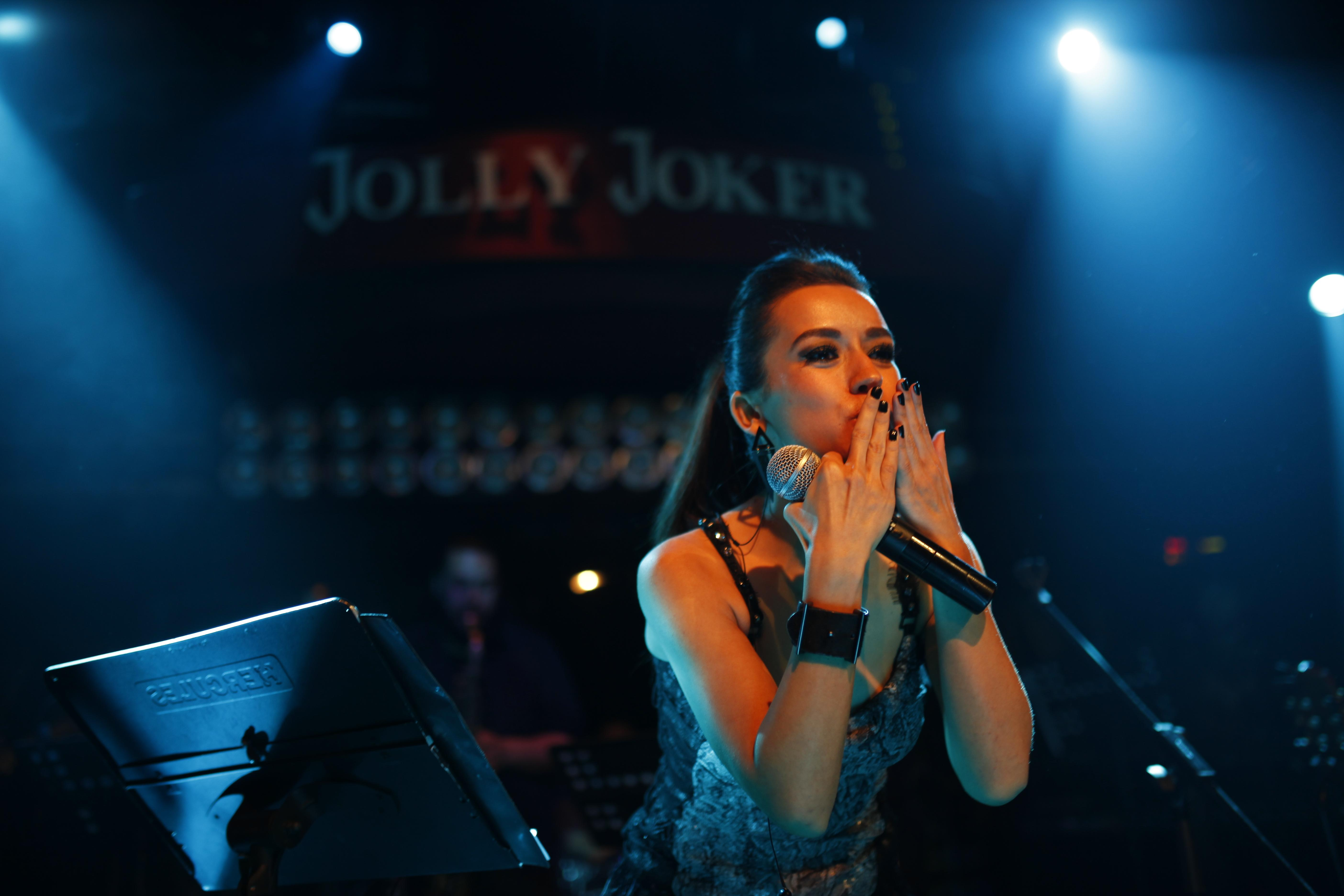
Tuğba Yurt, singer.

- Hadise, singer
- Funda Kılıç, singer
- Kubat, singer
- Melike Tarhan, musical artist
- Gulus Gulcugil Turkmen
- Tuğba Yurt, singer
- Bünyamin Çankırlı, rapper

== Politics ==
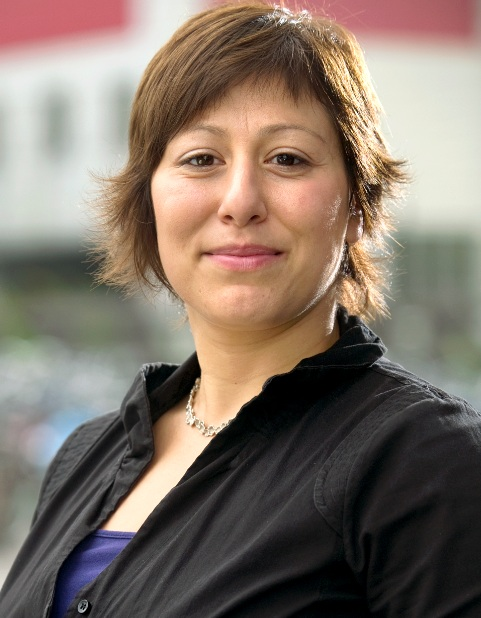
Meyrem Almaci, President of the Groen party.

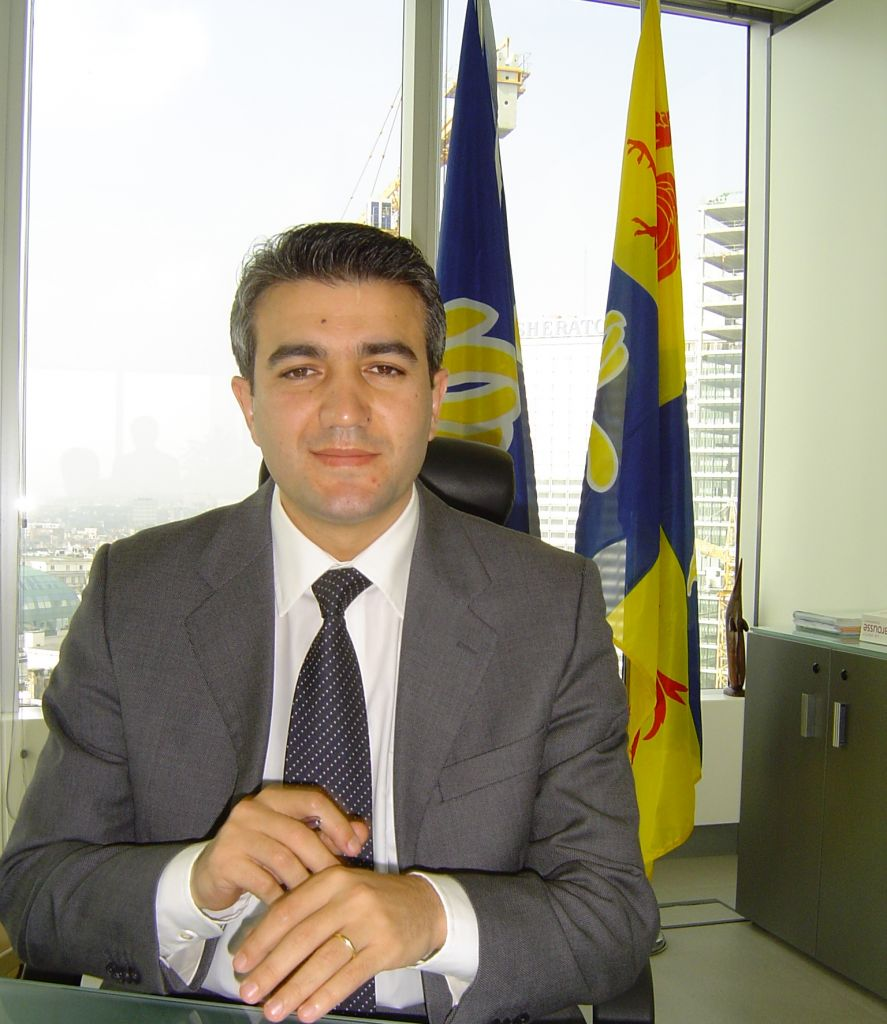
Emir Kir, Mayor of Saint-Josse-ten-Noode.

- Meyrem Almaci, President of the Groen party
- Kemal Bilmez, member of the Workers' Party of Belgium
- Cemal Çavdarlı, former member of the SP.A and the LDD; current member of the AKP
- Nawal Ben Hamou, member of the PS
- Meryem Kaçar, member of the Groen
- Serdar Kilic, member of the PS
- Emir Kir, Mayor of Saint-Josse-ten-Noode
- Ahmet Koç (politician), member of the SP.A
- Selahattin Koçak, former member of the SP.A and current member of the VLD
- Hasan Koyuncu, member of the PS
- Mahinur Özdemir , youngest and first female member of parliament with hijab; former member of cdH
- Özlem Özen, member of the PS
- Emin Özkara, former member of the PS
- Fatma Pehlivan, member of the SP.A
- Resul Tapmaz, member of the SP.A
- Ergün Top, member of the CD&V
- Güler Turan, member of the SP.A
- Funda Oru member of Vooruit
- Hilâl Yalçin, member of the CD&V
- Ayse Yigit, member of the PVDA
- Veli Yüksel, member of the VLD

== Sports ==
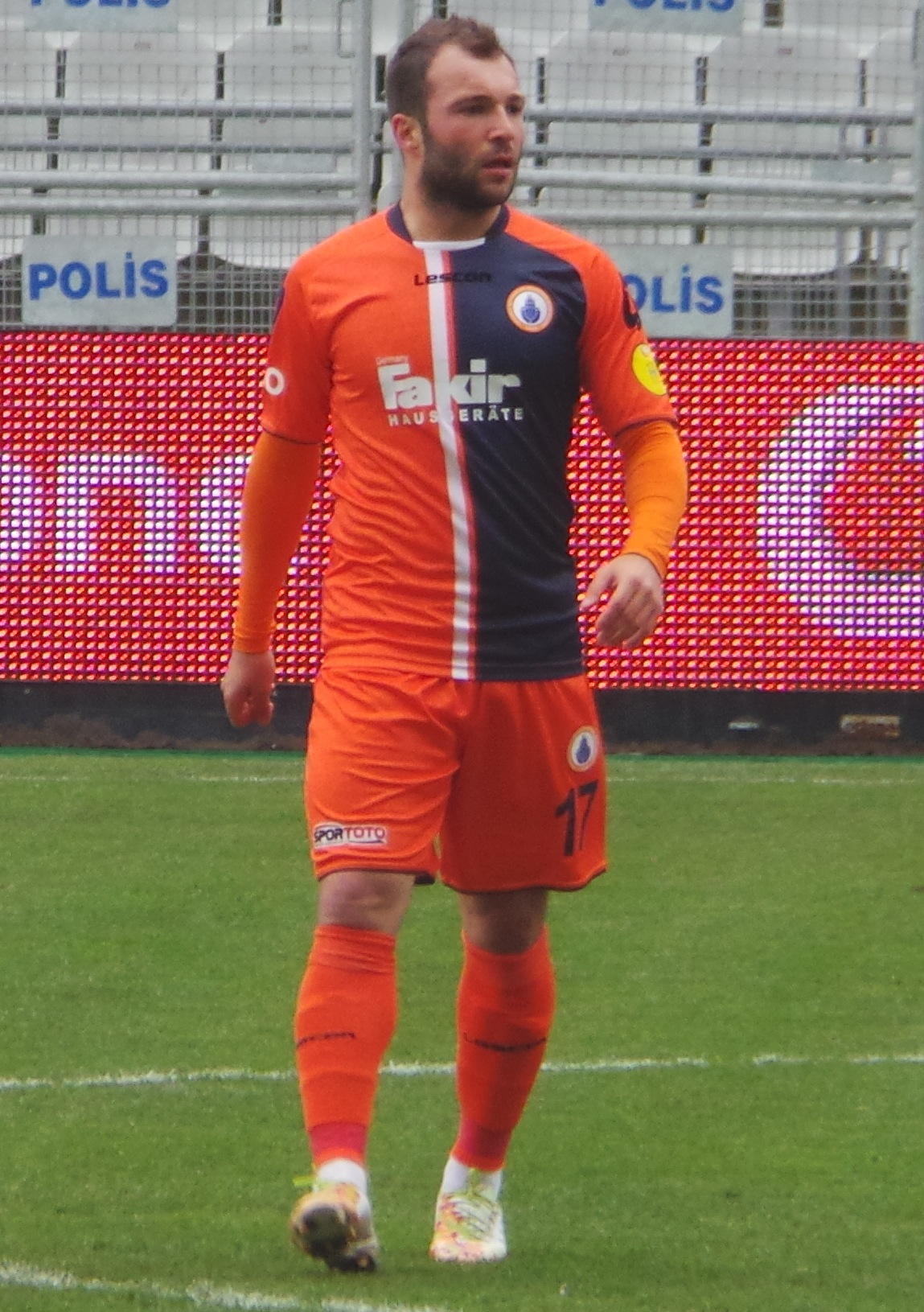
Murat Akın, the sporting director of Fatih Karagümrük S.K.

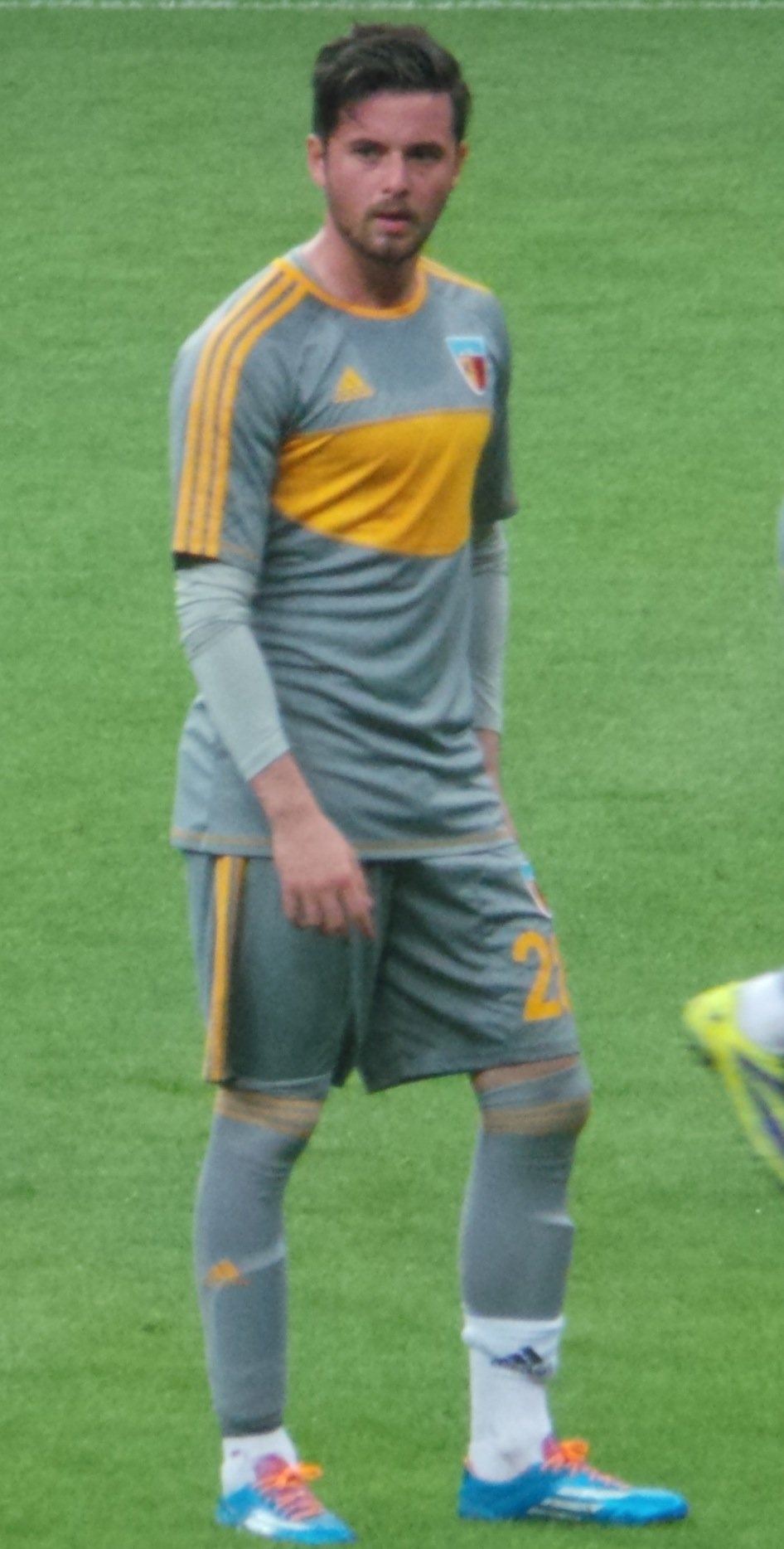
Engin Bekdemir, attacking midfielder for Ankaraspor.

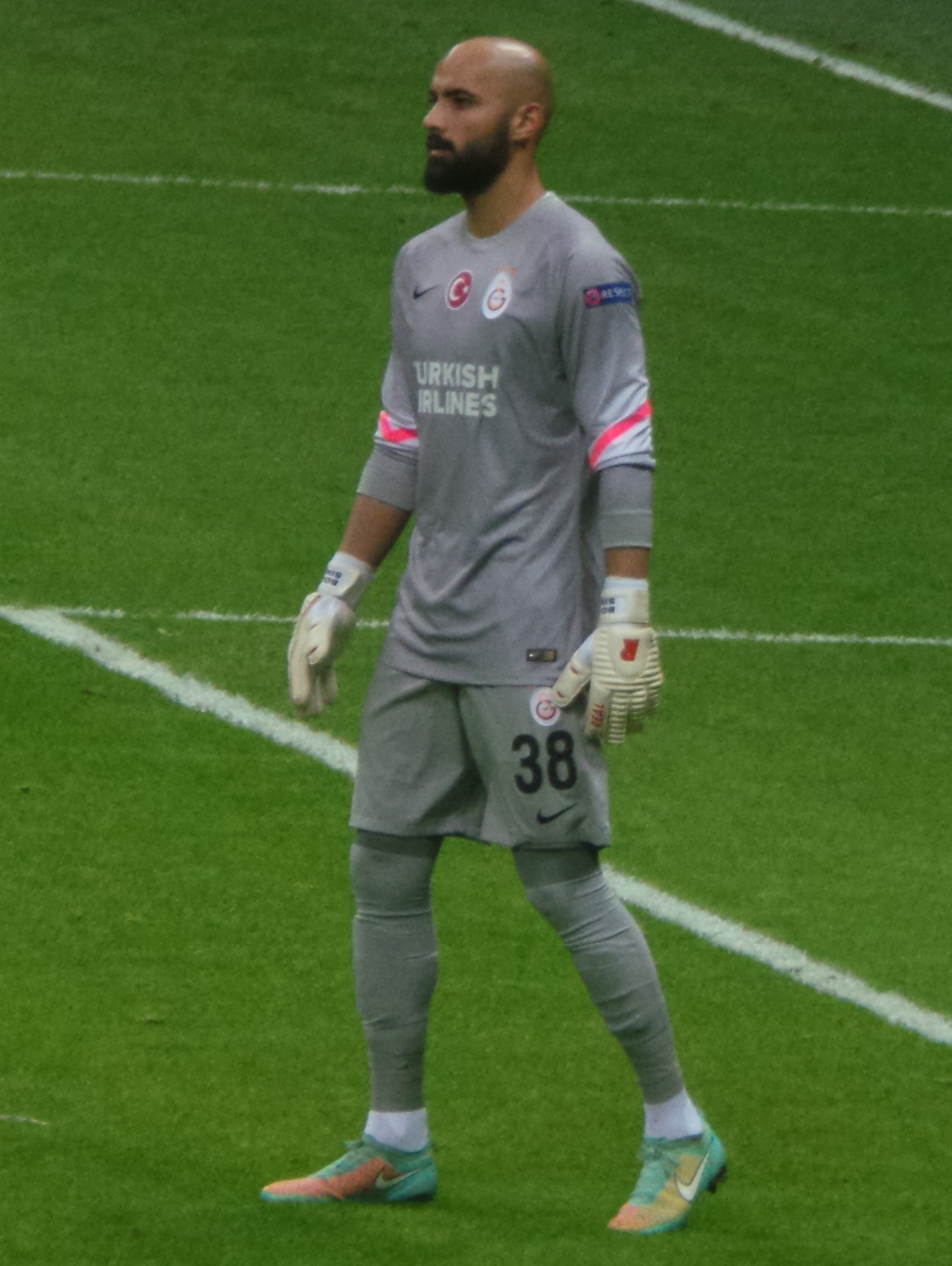
Sinan Bolat, goalkeeper for K.A.A. Gent.

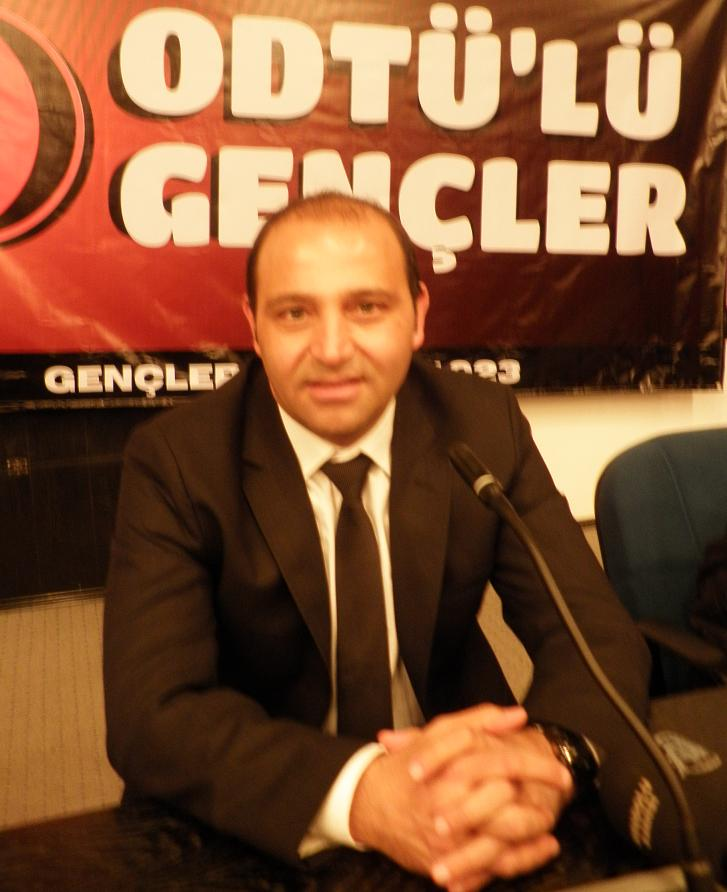
Fuat Çapa, manager of Kasımpaşa S.K.

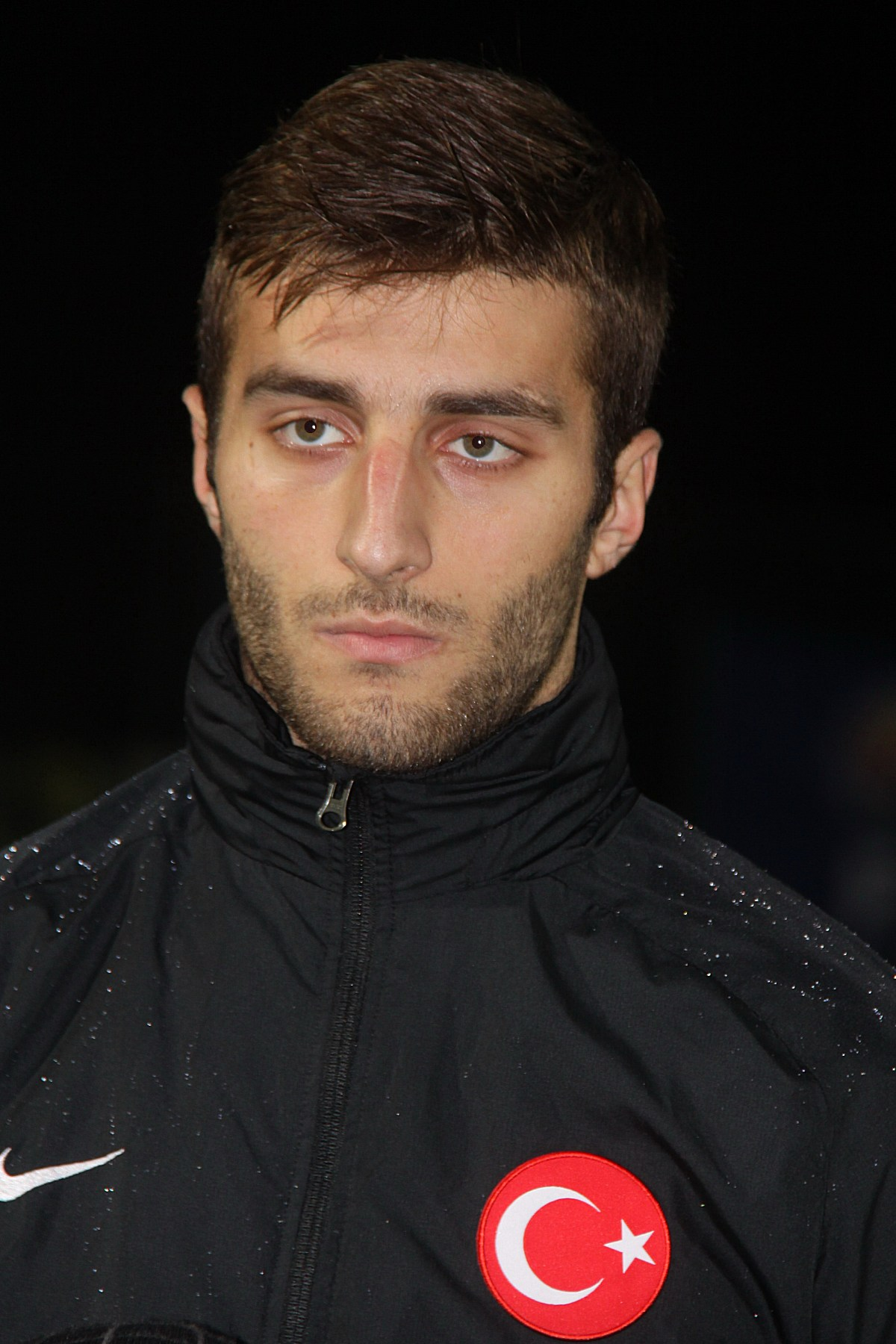
Alpaslan Öztürk, football player for Göztepe S.K.

- Izzet Akgül, football player
- Bülent Akın, football player
- Murat Akın, football player
- Yunus Bahadır, football player
- Hakan Bayraktar, football player
- Sami Bayraktar, futsal player
- Engin Bekdemir, football player
- Kadir Bekmezci, football player
- Hakan Bilgiç, football player
- Ümit Bilican, football player
- Sinan Bolat, football player
- Cihan Çanak, football player
- Fuat Çapa, football manager
- Ramazan Çevik, football player
- Deniz Demirkapu, kickboxer
- Kahraman Demirtaş, football player
- Murat Direkçi, middleweight kickboxer
- Ferhat Dogruel, football player
- Yunus Gülnar, football player
- Umut Gündoğan, football player
- Emrullah Güvenç, football player
- Serdal Güvenç, football player
- Abdullah İçel, futsal player
- Sefa İşçi, football player
- Adnan Januzaj, football player
- Yasin Karaca, football player
- Ahmet Karadayi, football player
- Burak Kardeş, football player
- Gökhan Kardeş, football player
- Ferhat Kaya, football player
- Onur Kaya, football player
- Ersan Keleş, futsal player
- Anıl Koç, football player
- Fazlı Kocabaş, football player
- Halil Köse, football player
- Ömer Kulga, football player
- Mert Kurt, football player
- Mohamed Ali Kurtuluş, football player
- Muhammed Mert, football player
- Ahmet Öcal, football player
- Hasan Özkan, football player
- Alpaslan Öztürk, football player
- Ferhat Poyraz, football player
- Aziz Sağlam, futsal player
- Enes Sağlık, football player
- Kubat Selim, boxer
- Erdem Şen, football player
- Taner Taktak, football player
- Mickaël Tirpan, football player (Turkish father)
- Önder Turacı, football player
- Fatih Turan, football player
- Adnan Ugur, football player
- Alper Uludağ, football player
- Cem Unal, football player
- Talha Ülvan, football player
- Cüneyt Vicil, futsal player
- Ali Yaşar, football player
- Hüseyin Yıldız, futsal player
- Muhammet Hanifi Yoldaş, football player
- Sara Yuceil, female football player

== Victims of crime ==
- Songül Koç, shot by Hans Van Themsche in 2006.

== See also ==
- Turks in Belgium
- List of Belgians
- List of Turkish Austrians
- List of British Turks
- List of Dutch people of Turkish descent
- List of Turkish French people
- List of Turkish Germans
- List of Turkish people
