= Turks in Belgium =

Ethnic group in Belgium

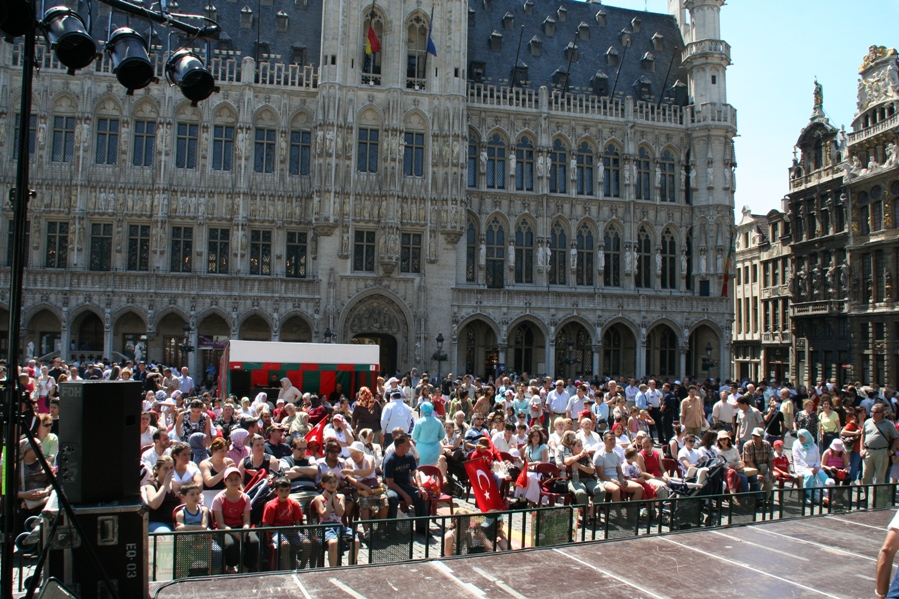
- Turkish day at the Grand-Place (2006)

Total population
- 250,000 to over 500,000 (latter including descendants)

Regions with significant populations
- Widespread

Languages
- Turkish; Dutch; French; German; some Rumelian Turkish

Religion
- Predominantly Sunni Islam; Minority Alevism, Christianity, other religions, and irreligion

Turks in Belgium (Turkish: Belçika'daki Türkler; Dutch: Turkse gemeenschap in België; French: Turcs en Belgique), also referred to as Turkish Belgians or Belgian Turks (Turkish: Belçika Türkleri; Dutch: Turkse Belgen; French: Belgo-Turcs) are people of full or partial Turkish ethnicity living in Belgium. The majority of Belgian Turks descend from the Republic of Turkey; however, there has also been significant Turkish migration from other post-Ottoman countries including ethnic Turkish communities which have come to Belgium from the Balkans (especially from Bulgaria, Greece, Kosovo, North Macedonia and Romania), the island of Cyprus, and more recently Iraq and Syria.

== History ==
=== Turkish migration from the Republic of Turkey ===
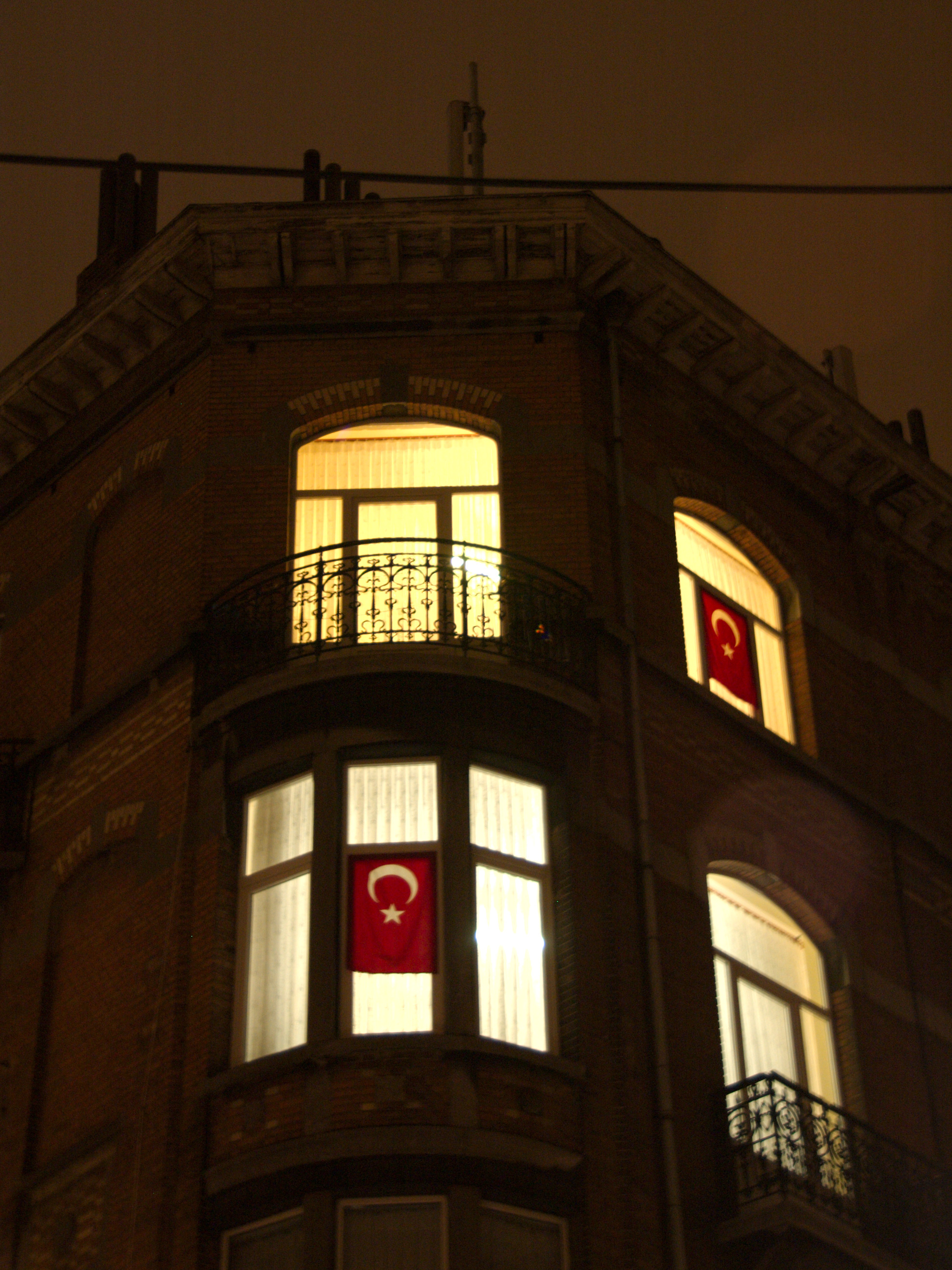
Turkish flags in the Brussels town of Saint-Josse-ten-Noode

Turkish migration from the Republic of Turkey to Belgium began in the 1960s when Belgium was actively encouraging immigration to meet its employment needs in an era of rapid economic expansion. These immigrants were welcomed as "guest workers" when Belgium and Turkey signed a bilateral agreement in July 1964. As mainly unskilled labourers, Turkish immigrants hoped to make a fortune in a short time and then return to their homeland. The majority of Turkish migrants arrived from the central Anatolian provinces of Afyon (particularly from Emirdağ), Eskisehir, Kayseri, Konya (particularly from Piribeyli) and Sivas. Many settled in the industrialised areas of Belgium; thereafter, these migrants brought their families over when Belgium attempted to resolve the growing problem of low population by encouraging family reunification.

By the 1970s the phenomenon of immigrants arriving in Belgium with a tourist visa started; most came from Afyon, especially from the town of Emirdağ. Upon arrival they looked for work and tried to legalise their status as labourers. The presence of these tourists created a black market labour force so that on two occasions the government had to legalise their status. Once they obtained the status of "guest workers" they could bring in their family.

By the 1980s, immigration to Belgium for economic reasons was forbidden by law. The only legal way to take up residence in Belgium was by family reunification, which was only applicable to members of the nuclear family of guest workers or by marrying someone who was a Belgian citizen. Another possible motive for coming to Belgium was to apply for the status of asylum-seeker upon arrival. Turkish asylum seekers came from all over Turkey, with some belonging to minority groups.

Mainland Turks have continued to migrate to Belgium in the twenty-first century in the hope of building a better future; many lured by social and economic security.

In the modern era, due to the political instability and economic crisis, Turkish economic seekers moving to Belgium has doubled compared to the previous years while those for asking for asylum has tripled, from 660 to 1,243 and 673 to 1,721 respectively.

=== Turkish migration from the Balkans ===
==== Bulgaria ====
Initially, Turkish Bulgarians first arrived in Belgium as refugees in the 1980s due to the Bulgarisation policies of the so-called "Revival Process" under the communist ruler Todor Zivkov which sought to forcefully assimilate the Turkish minority. The next wave of Turkish Bulgarian migrants in the 1990s and early 2000s were mostly undocumented migrants. These early Turkish Bulgarian arrivals found work in areas where there was an established mainland Turkish community, especially in Ghent, but also in Melle, Zele and Hamme.

More recently, after Bulgaria became a member of the European Union during the 2007 enlargement, the number of Turkish Bulgarian migrants to Belgium increased significantly due to their freedom of movement rights as EU citizens. Thus, Turkish Bulgarian emigration to Belgium in the twenty-first century has been dictated by the economic situation and the stagnation of the labour market in Bulgaria.

As a result of the continuous Turkish Bulgarian migration, the majority of Bulgarian citizens living in Belgium are ethnically Turkish; moreover, Turkish Bulgarian children who were either born in Belgium, or who arrived at preschool age, hardly understand the Bulgarian language. Most Turkish Bulgarians tend to live in areas where there is a large mainland Turkish population, such as Genk. Thus, "Genk Bulgarians" are mostly of Turkish origin; in 2013, estimates on the population in Genk alone ranged between 10,000 and 20,000.

==== Greece ====
There have been two main waves of migration from the Turkish minority of Western Thrace (located in Greece) to Western Europe, including to Belgium. The first wave of Turkish Western Thracian migration started in the 1960s and intensified further between 1970-2010 due to political and economic reasons.

Although many Western Thrace Turks living in Western Europe intended to return to Greece after working for a number of years, the Greek government used Article 19 of the 1955 Greek Constitution to strip members of the Turkish minority living abroad of their Greek citizenship. According to Article 19 of the Greek Constitution:

A person of non-Greek ethnic origin leaving Greece without the intention of returning may be declared as having lost Greek nationality.

A report published by the Human Rights Watch in 1990 confirmed that:

Under Article 19, ethnic Turks can be stripped of their citizenship by an administrative decree, without a hearing. According to the U.S. State Department's 1989 Country Report, under Greek law there can be no judicial review and there is no effective right of appeal.

Thus, many Western Thrace Turks were forced to remain in the countries they had settled in, which, in turn, also established the permanent Turkish Western Thracian community in Belgium.

More recently, the second mass migration wave of ethnic Turks from Greece has been significantly larger in numbers, although it occurred only within eight years, between 2010–18, due to the Greek government-debt crisis.

==== Kosovo ====
Migration from the Turkish Kosovar community to Belgium began when many were forced to flee the Kosovo War (1998–99). Alongside the Turkish Macedonians in Belgium, they are active in the Belçika Rumeli Türkleri Derneği ("Belgian Rumelian Turkish Association").

==== North Macedonia ====
The Turkish Macedonian minority have joined other Macedonian citizens in migrating to Belgium. Together with the Turkish Kosovars in Belgium, the Turkish Macedonians are active in the Belçika Rumeli Türkleri Derneği ("Belgian Rumelian Turkish Association").

==== Romania ====
Since the first decade of the twenty-first century, there has been a significant decrease in the population of the Turkish Romanian minority group due to the admission of Romania into the European Union in 2007 and the subsequent relaxation of the travelling and migration regulations. Hence, Turkish Romanians, especially from the Dobruja region, have joined other Romanian citizens in migrating mostly to Western European countries, including Belgium.

=== Turkish migration from the Levant ===
==== Cyprus ====
Most Turkish Cypriot migrants left the island of Cyprus due to economic and political reasons in the 20th century, especially after the Cyprus crisis of 1963–64 and then the 1974 Cypriot coup d'état carried out by the Greek military junta which was followed by the Turkish invasion of the island. More recently, with the 2004 enlargement of the European Union, Turkish Cypriots have had the right to live and work across the European Union, including in Belgium, as EU citizens. In 2012, hundreds of Turkish Cypriots gathered in Brussels to draw attention to the EU's failure to keep the promises made to Northern Cyprus after having voted in favour of reunification during the 2004 Annan Plan referendum. The TRNC provides assistance to its Turkish Cypriot residents living in Belgium via the TRNC Brussels Representative Office located in Avenue Louise; in addition, the office promotes friendly relations between the TRNC and Belgium, as well as economic and cultural relations.

==== Iraq ====
Turkish Iraqis have settled in Belgium due to various conflicts in Iraq, including the Iran–Iraq War (1980–88), the Gulf War (1991), and the Iraq War (2003–11). The majority of Iraqi Turks have arrived in Belgium during the European migrant crisis (2014–19) alongside other Iraqi refugees.

==== Syria ====
Due to the Syrian civil war, many Syrian Turks have sought refuge in Turkey and Western Europe. In particular, it was during the European migrant crisis (2014–19) that Syrian citizens came to Belgium in larger numbers.

=== Turkish migration from the modern diaspora ===
In addition to ethnic Turkish people that have migrated to Belgium from post-Ottoman modern nation-states, there has also been an increasing migration wave from the modern Turkish diaspora. For example, members of the Turkish Dutch community have also arrived in Belgium as Dutch citizens. According to a study by Petra Wieke de Jong, focusing on second-generation Turkish-Dutch people specifically born between the years 1983 and 1992 only, 1,208 people from this age group and generation reported Belgium as their country of emigration in 2001 to 2017. A further 1,761 people in this group did not report their emigration destination.

== Demographics ==
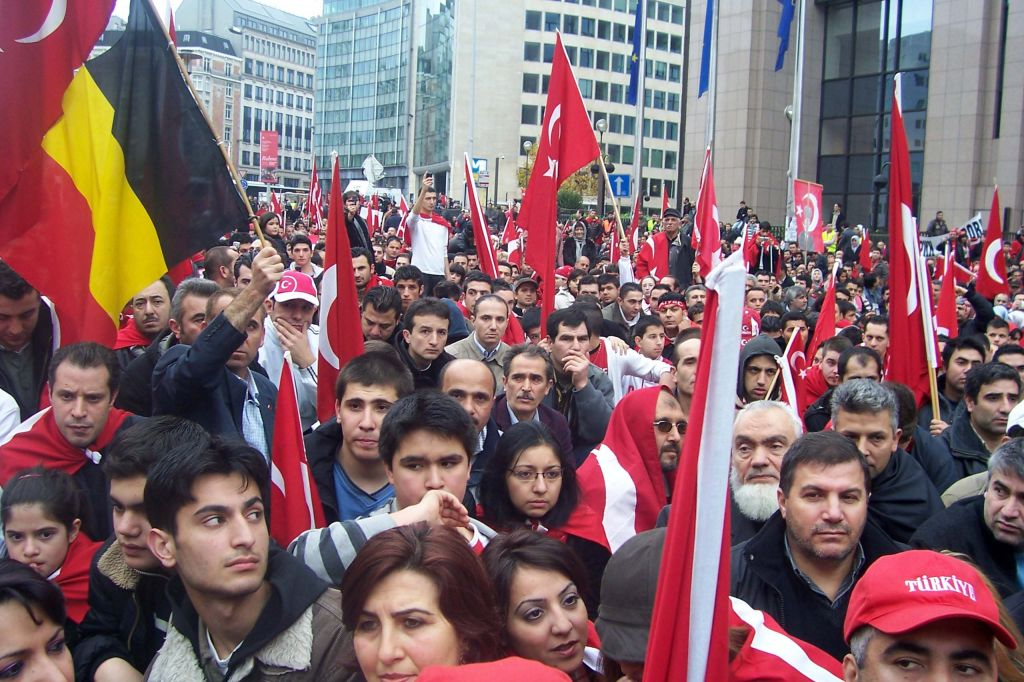
Turkish people gathering in Brussels.

Around half of Turkish Belgians live in the Flemish region, one-quarter in Wallonia, and one-quarter in Brussels. Turks from the same region in Turkey tend to congregate not only in the same cities but also in the same quarters. The majority of Turks live in the Schaerbeek commune. The Chaussee De Haecht street is heavily populated with Turkish immigrants, with its pizzerias, pastry shops, cafes, and barbers, is reminiscent of a Turkish street.

=== Population ===
Official Belgian data only collects statistics on foreign citizens rather than the ethnic affiliation of Belgian citizens. Consequently, the Turkish Belgian community cannot self-declare their ethnicity in censuses.

The majority of Turkish Belgians are mainland Turks and their Belgian-born descendants, however, there are growing Turkish communities from the Balkans (e.g. Balkan Turks, Bulgarian Turks, Macedonian Turks, Romanian Turks, Western Thrace Turks etc.) and the Levant (e.g. Cypriot Turks, Iraqi Turks and Syrian Turks) who are registered according to their citizenship (i.e. "Belgian", "Bulgarian", "Cypriot", "Greek", "Iraqi", "Syrian" etc.) rather than their Turkish ethnicity.

In 2012 Professor Raymond Taras said that the population of Turkish Belgians totalled over 200,000. However, in 2021 Thierry Debels pointed out that various sources stated that there was already 500,000 Turks in Belgium since the early 1990s, including Turkish-Belgian descendants.

Similarly, in 2023 it was estimated by The European Conservative that Belgium was home to 500,000 residents of Turkish origin.

== Discrimination ==
Belgian Turks and Turkish people have faced significant discrimination, prejudice, racism and xenophobia across Belgium.

In the past several years, many right and left wings Belgian political parties criticized domestic Turkish politics and called for banning or deporting Turkish immigrants.

In 2015, a female employee shouted "Dirty Turk" (in Dutch: 'Vuile Turk') at a Supervisor of Turkish origin in the Volvo car factory in Ghent, which led to a Strike action by Turkish workers at the factory.

Filip Dewinter a right-wing Flemish nationalist party member said in May 2017 at TV-program De Zevende Dag,

The solution is for Turkish minorities in Flemish region, another method should be applied not only integrate Turks into Flemish culture but assimilate Turks. Leave identity behind leaving culture behind and fully assimilate in our society, if not so return to the country of origin is the only solution.

== Religion ==
The majority of Turks are Sunni Muslims Several Turkish Sunni groupings are active in Belgium, most notably Milli Görüş (Fédération islamique belge), the Süleymancis (Union des Centres culturels islamiques de Belgique) and the Nurcus . As in other countries, there is also an official Sunni Diyanet (Fondation religieuse islamique turque de Belgique), which controls most mosques and a majority of the affiliations to the repatriation funerary insurance.

Another Turkish Muslim community present in Belgium is the Alevi one, with several associations in Brussels, the Centre culturel turc pour le respect de la personne humaine - Erenler (Turkish cultural centre for the respect of the human being - Erenler), officially registered in 1994, founded by Alevis from the village of Karacalar, near Emirdag, led by their traditional spirituel leader (dede) from the Şahbaz family, and the more progressive Centre socioculturel alévi de Bruxelles, officially registered in 2003 by 14 founding members, 4 of whom were born in Elbistan, 3 in Belgium, 2 in Gücük (near Elbistan), the rest in Adıyaman, Inis, Tunceli, Soğucak and Sünköy, Elâzığ), Charleroi (Centre culturel alévi de Charleroi, officially registered in 1999 by 9 founding members, 6 of whom had the dual Turkish-Belgian citizenship), Antwerp (Alevietische Kultureel Centrum Antwerpen), Liège (from 2002 till 2004 Liège Alevi Kültür Derneği - Association culturelle Alévi de Liège, since 2005 Foyer culturel alévi de Liège) and the Limburg province (Samenwerking Limburgse Alevieten, officially registered in 1990). There is also a Federation of the Belgian Alevi Associations, Belçika Alevi Birlikleri Federasyonu, since 2008 Fédération unions des Alévis en Belgique - Belçika Alevi Birlikleri Federasyonu (FUAB-BABF), created in 2003, based in Antwerp, then in Brussels in 2006, and grouping the Alevietische Kultureel Centrum Antwerpen, the Centre culturel alévi de Charleroi and the Samenwerking Limburgse Alevieten.

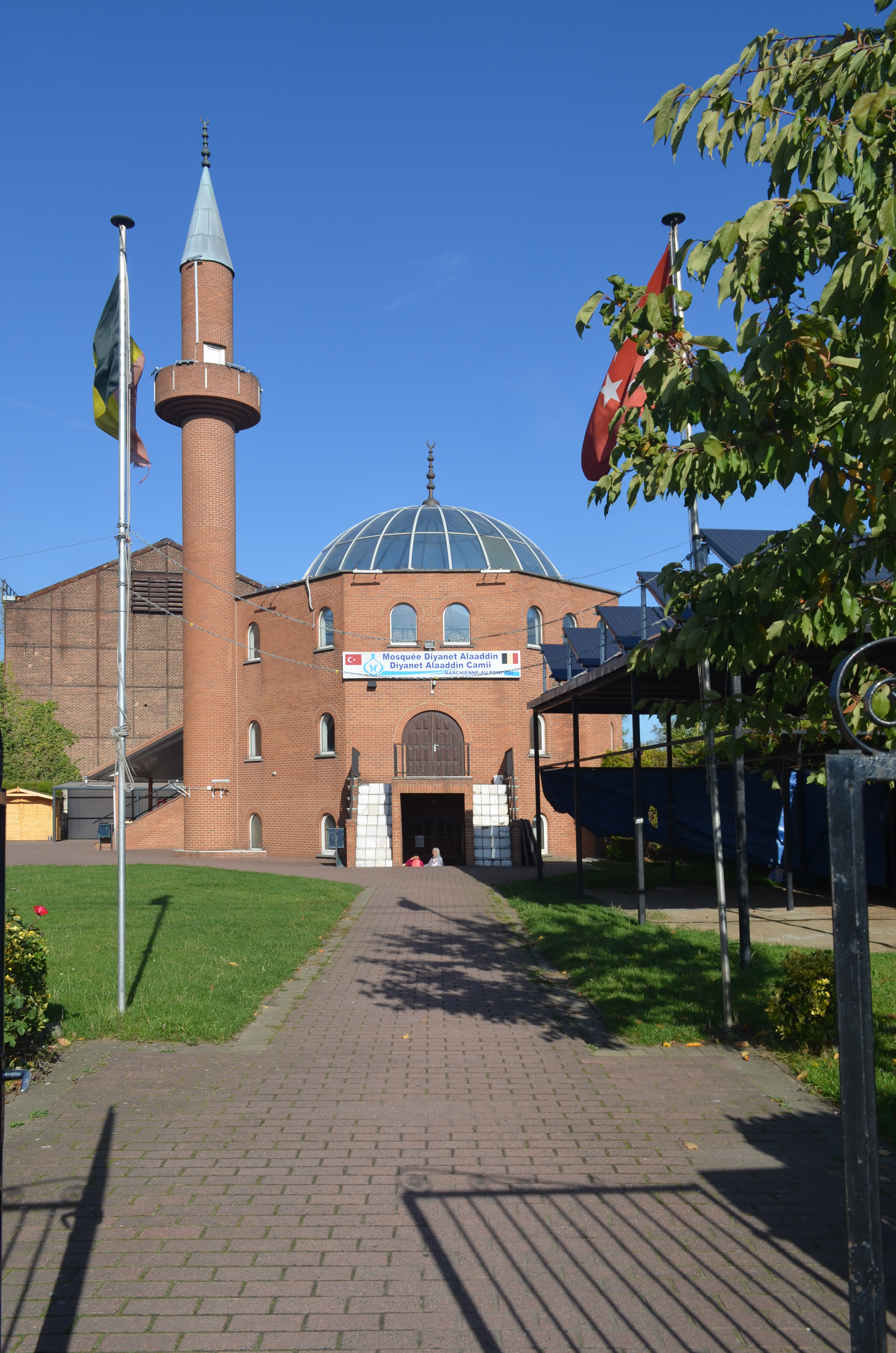
Alaaddin Mosque in Marchienne-au-Pont, Charleroi.

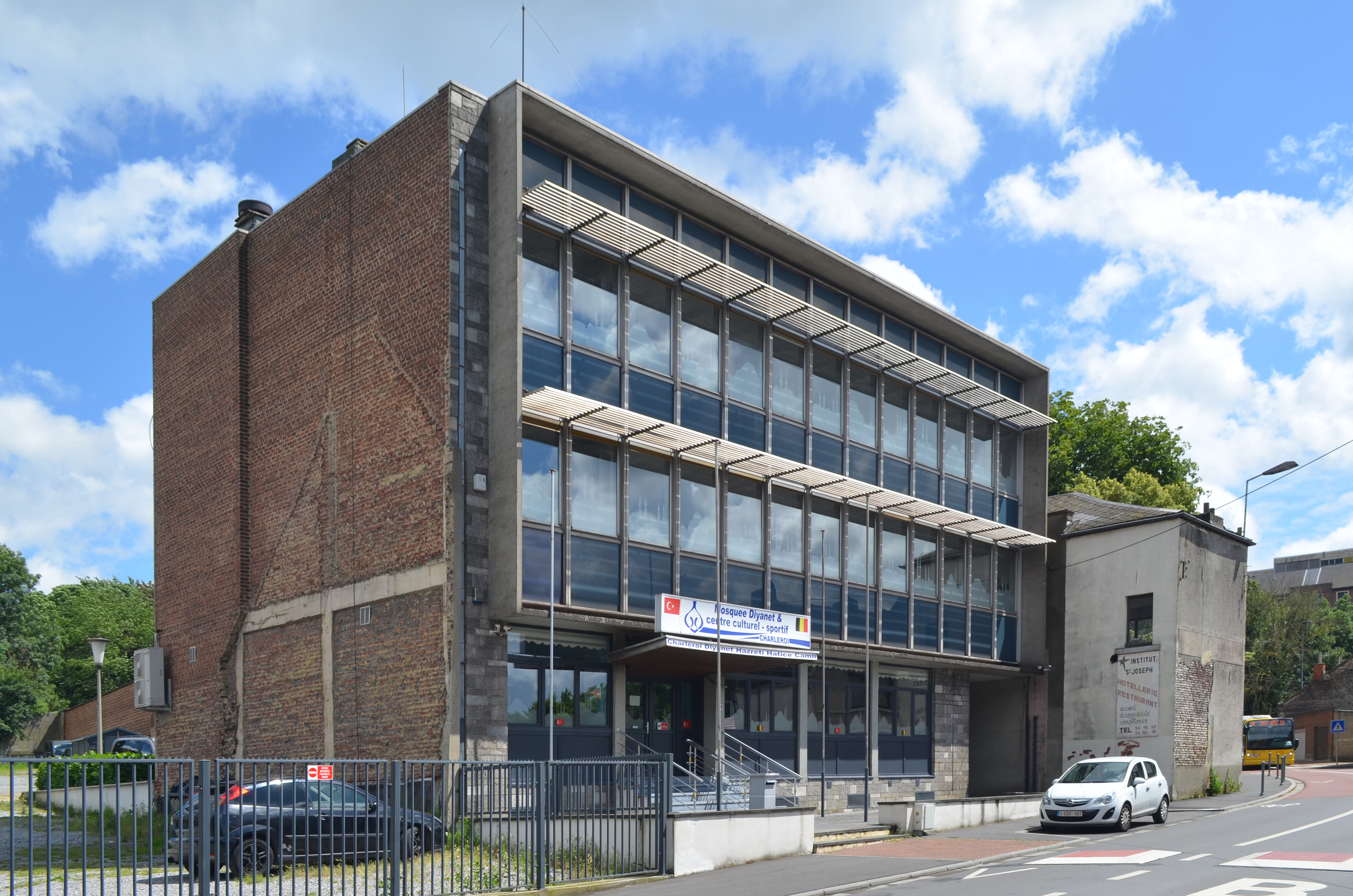
Diyanet Mosque in Rue Pige-au-Croly, Charleroi.

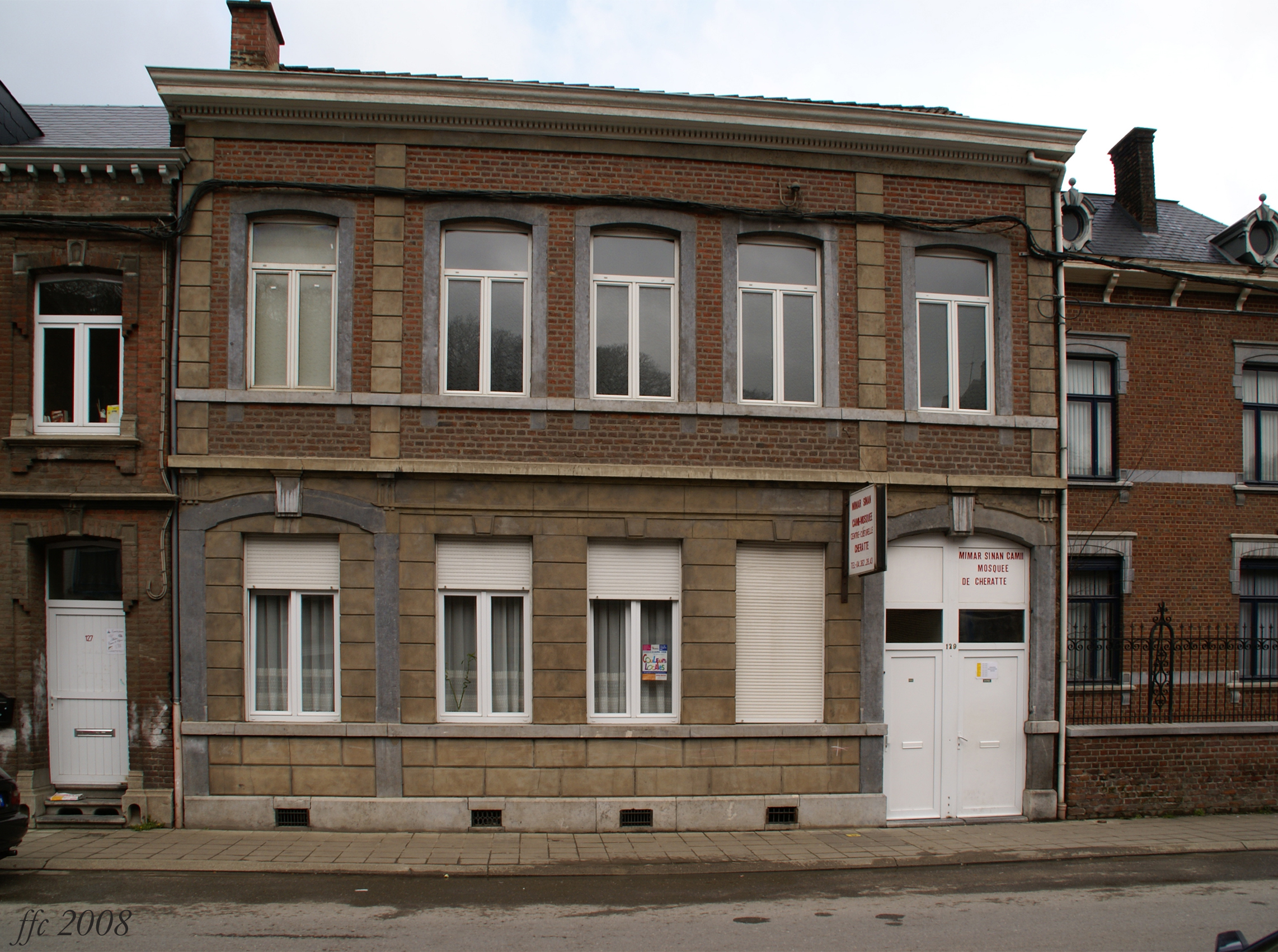
Mimar Sinan Mosque in Visé.

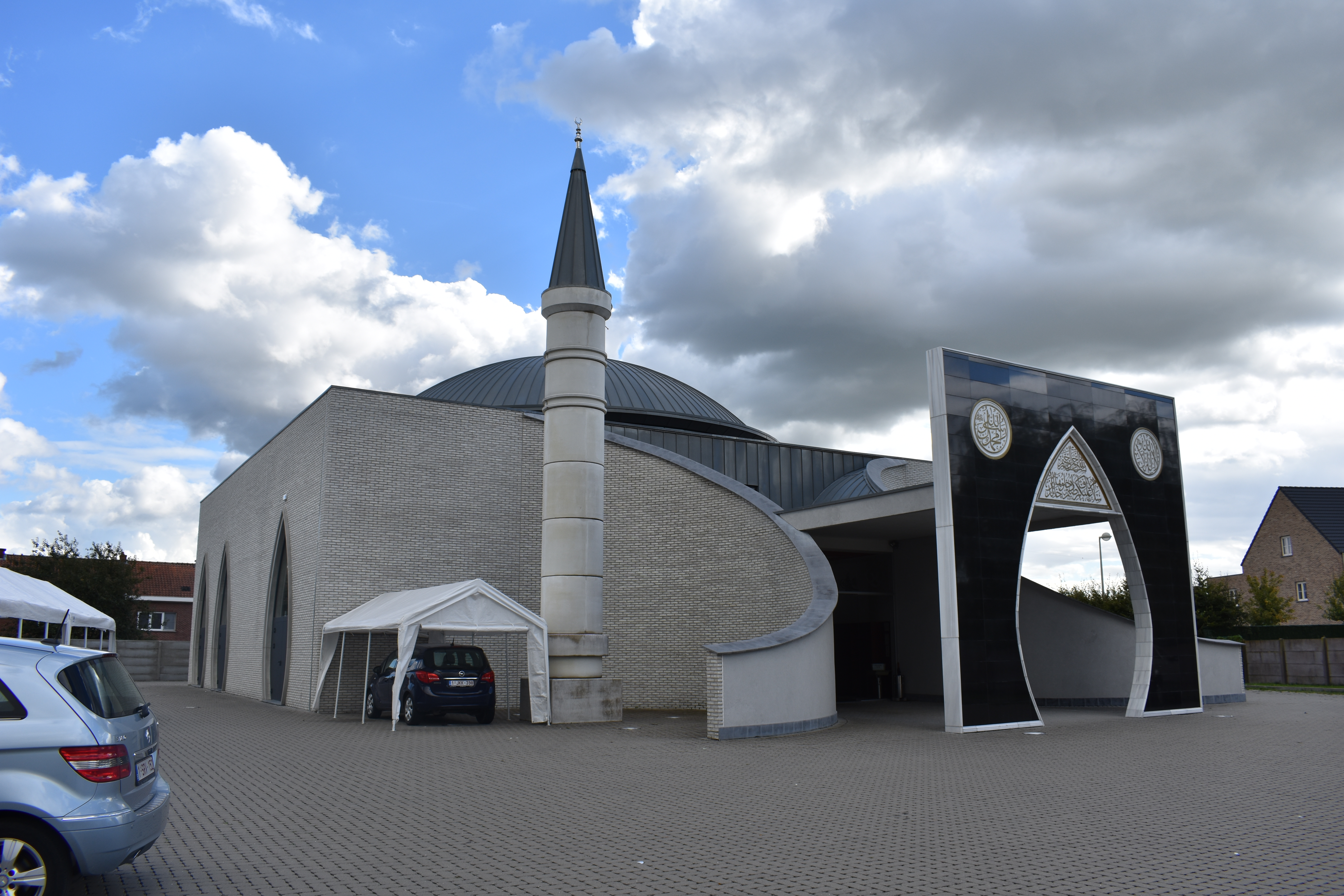
Molla Gürani Mosque in Lier.

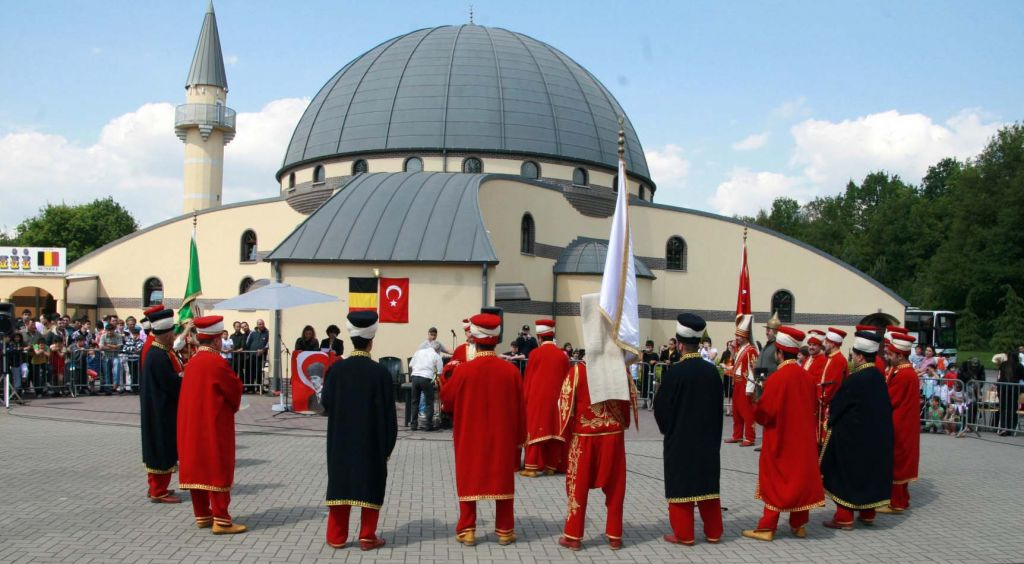
Yunus Emre Mosque in Genk.

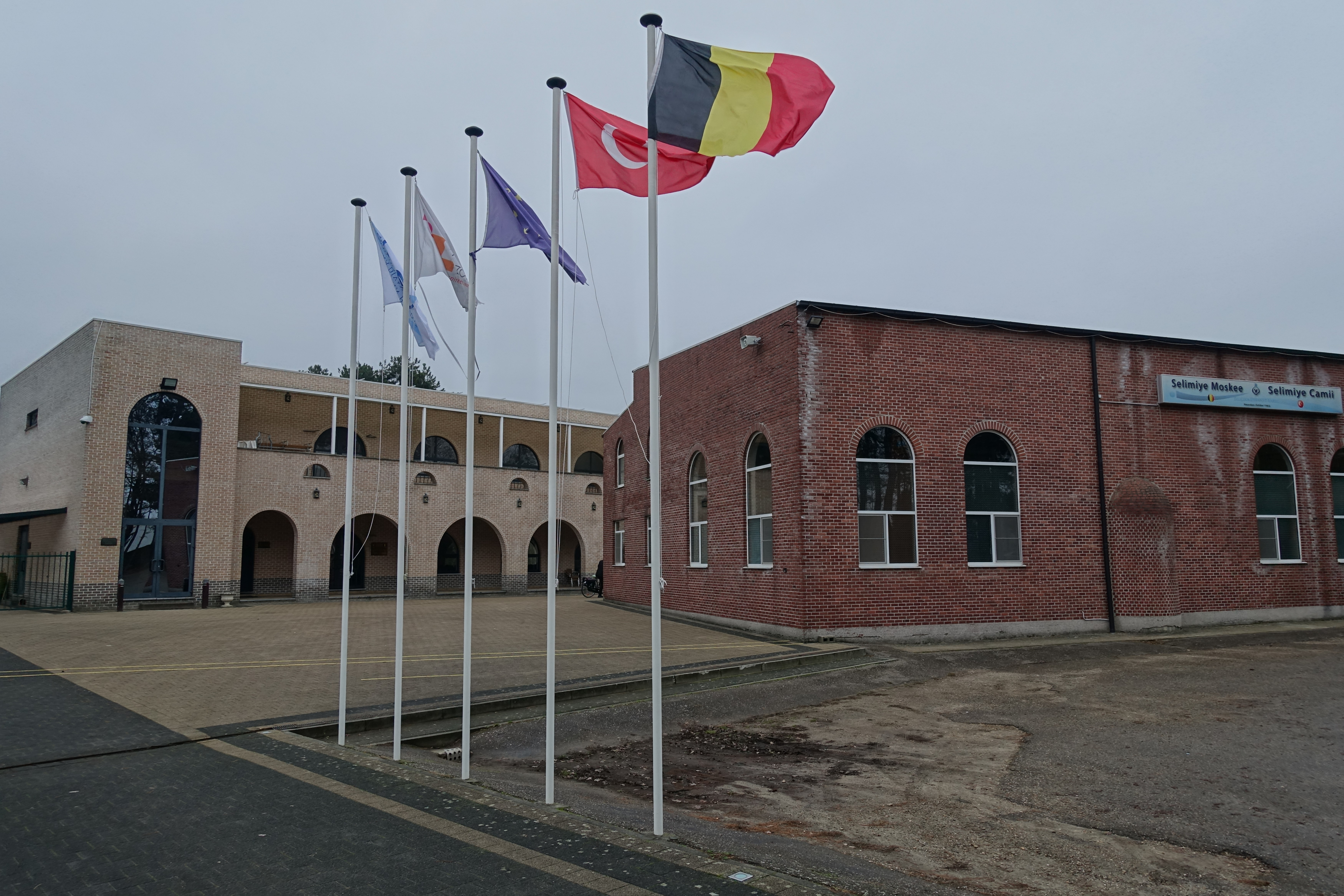
Selimiye Mosque in Heusden-Zolder.

== Organisations and associations ==
There are dozens of Turkish associations in Belgium, most are grouped into federations, either linked to the Turkish government (Diyanet) and embassy or to various Turkish religious and political movements, Milli Görüş (Fédération islamique belge), the Nurcus, the Süleymancis (Union des Centres islamiques de Belgique), the Grey Wolves (Belçika Ülkücü Türk Dernekleri Federasyon/Belçika Türk Federasyonu) etc. Apart from these, there are also civil society associations of fellow countryman such as BTDB (Federation of Turkish Associations in Belgium), Belgium Piribeyli Culture & Solidarity Association, Emirdag People Solidarity Association (EYAD), BETİAD (Belgian Turkish Businessmen Association) and charity organizations.

== Political participation ==
At the federal level, several deputies and senators have been elected or coopted to the Belgian Chamber of Representatives and Senate. Among them, the Flemish Socialists Cemal Çavdarlı (deputy in 2003-2007) and Fatma Pehlivan (senator in 2001-2007, and again in 2009-2010), the Flemish Ecologists Meryem Kaçar (senator in 1999-2003) and Meyrem Almacı (deputy since 2007, reelected in 2010), the Flemish Christian Democrat Hilâl Yalçin (deputy in 2007-2010); Antwerp district mayor since January 2013) and French-speaking Socialist Özlem Özen (deputy since June 2010).

There are also Turkish-Belgian members of the regional parliaments, one of them, Emir Kir (French-speaking Socialist Party), became an underminister in the Brussels regional government in 2004, and again in 2009, as Secretary for Public Sanitation and Monument Conservation.

== Music ==
Turks have also contributed to music in Belgium, recently Hadise daughter of a family from Sivas was in the pop music world in Belgium. Hadise made a name for herself in 2003 in the “Idool” song contest sponsored by VTM, the largest Belgian broadcaster. Her songs “Stir Me Up” and her album “Milk Chocolate Girl” were on top of the charts for a long time.

== Notable people ==
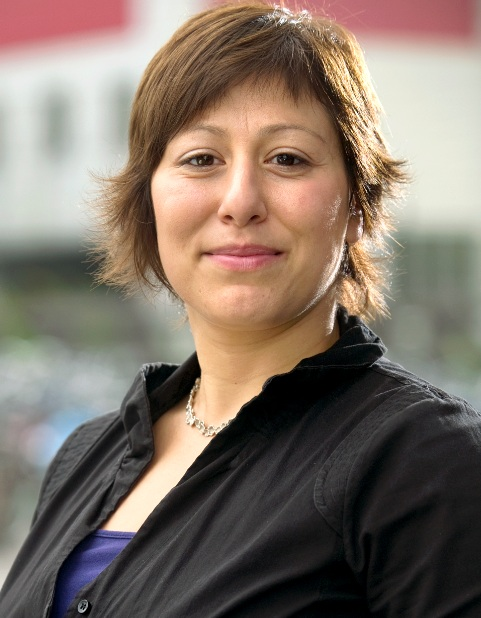
Meyrem Almaci, Party President of Groen

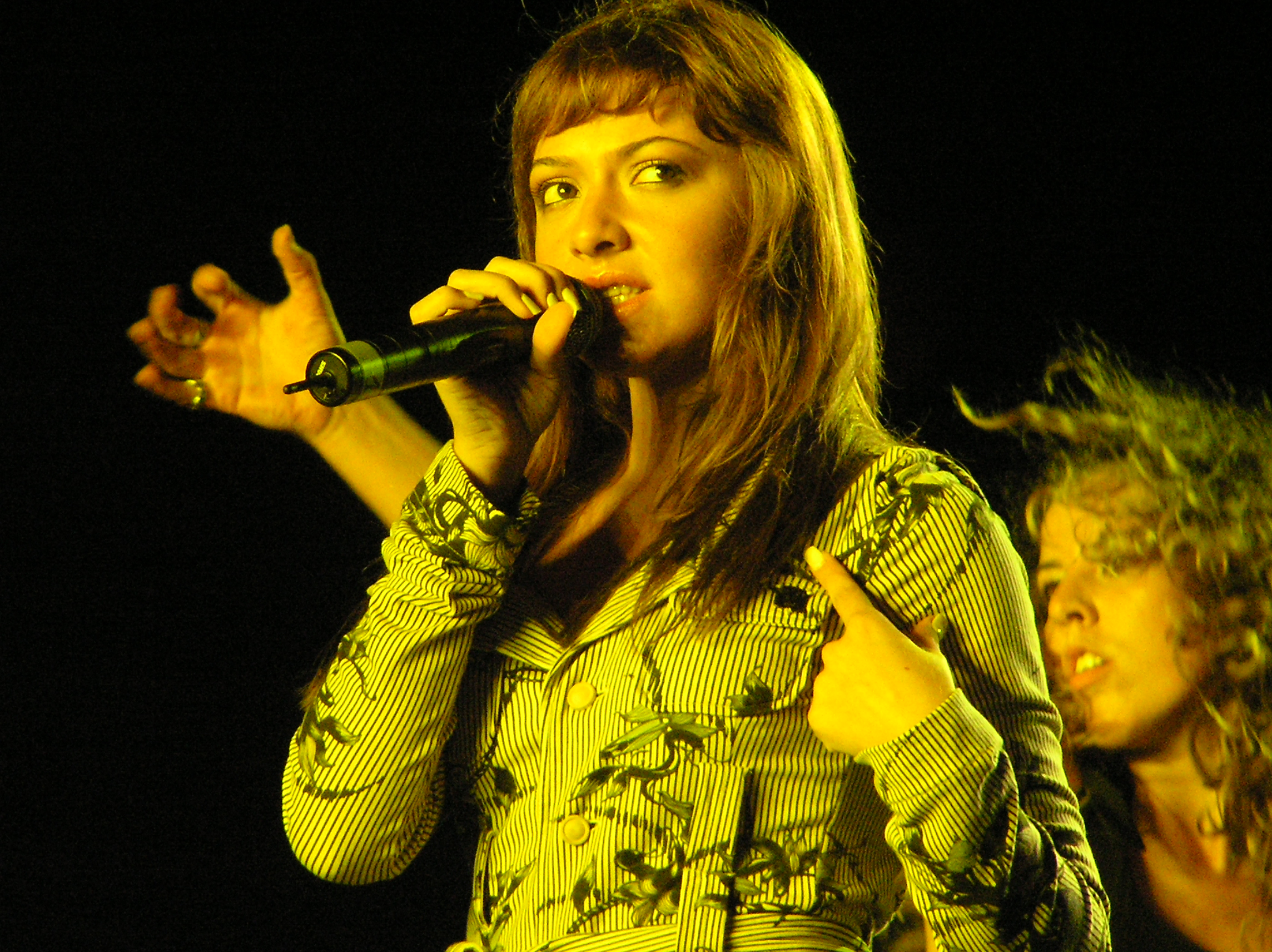
Hadise Açıkgöz, singer

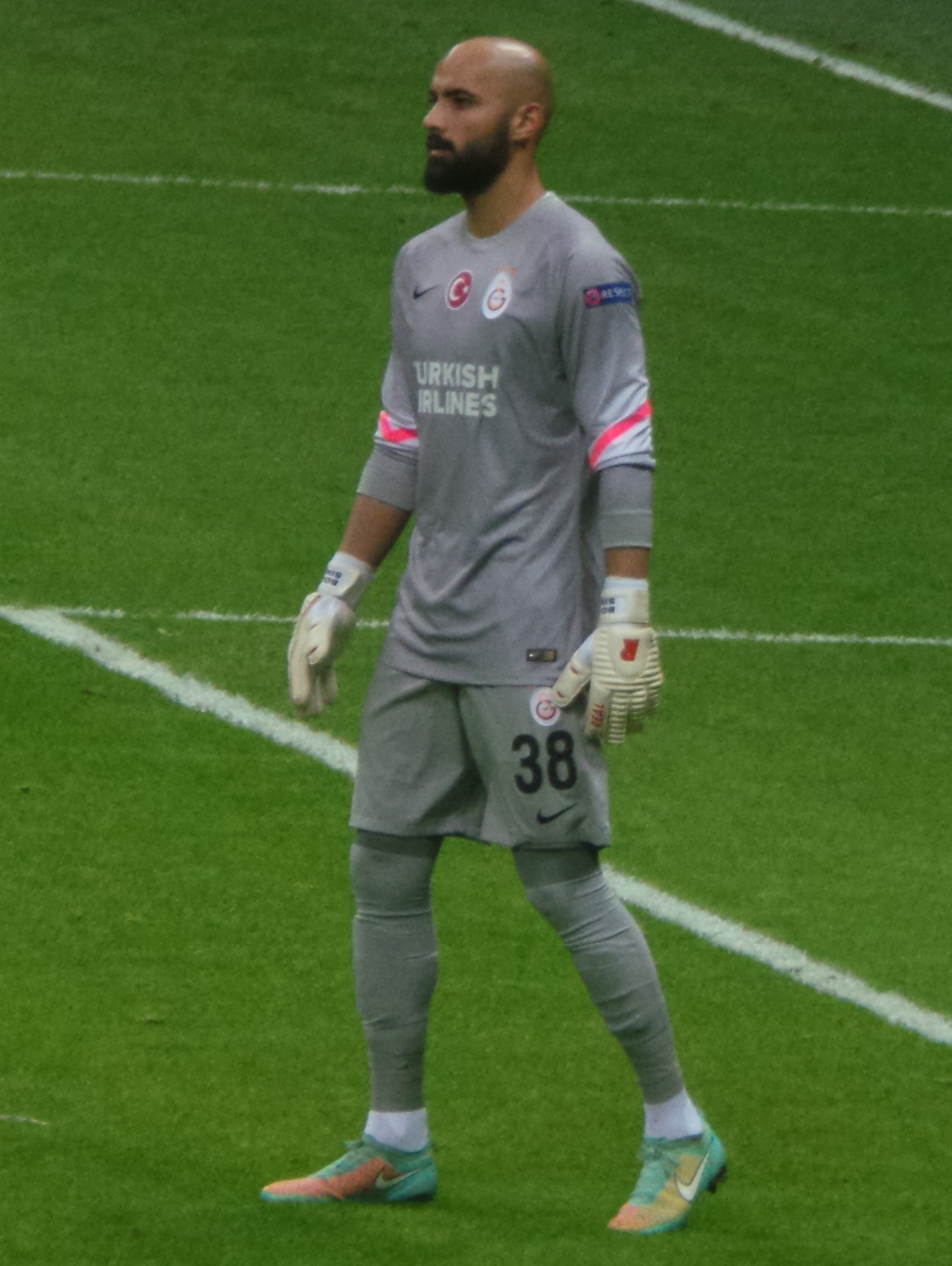
Sinan Bolat, football player

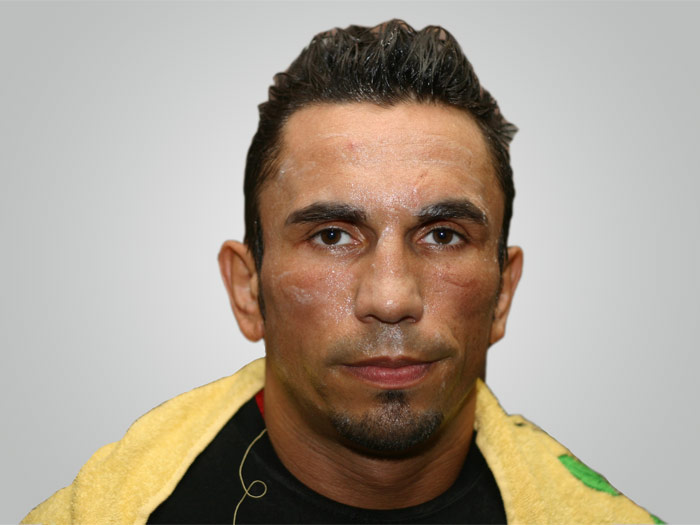
Murat Direkçi, kickboxer

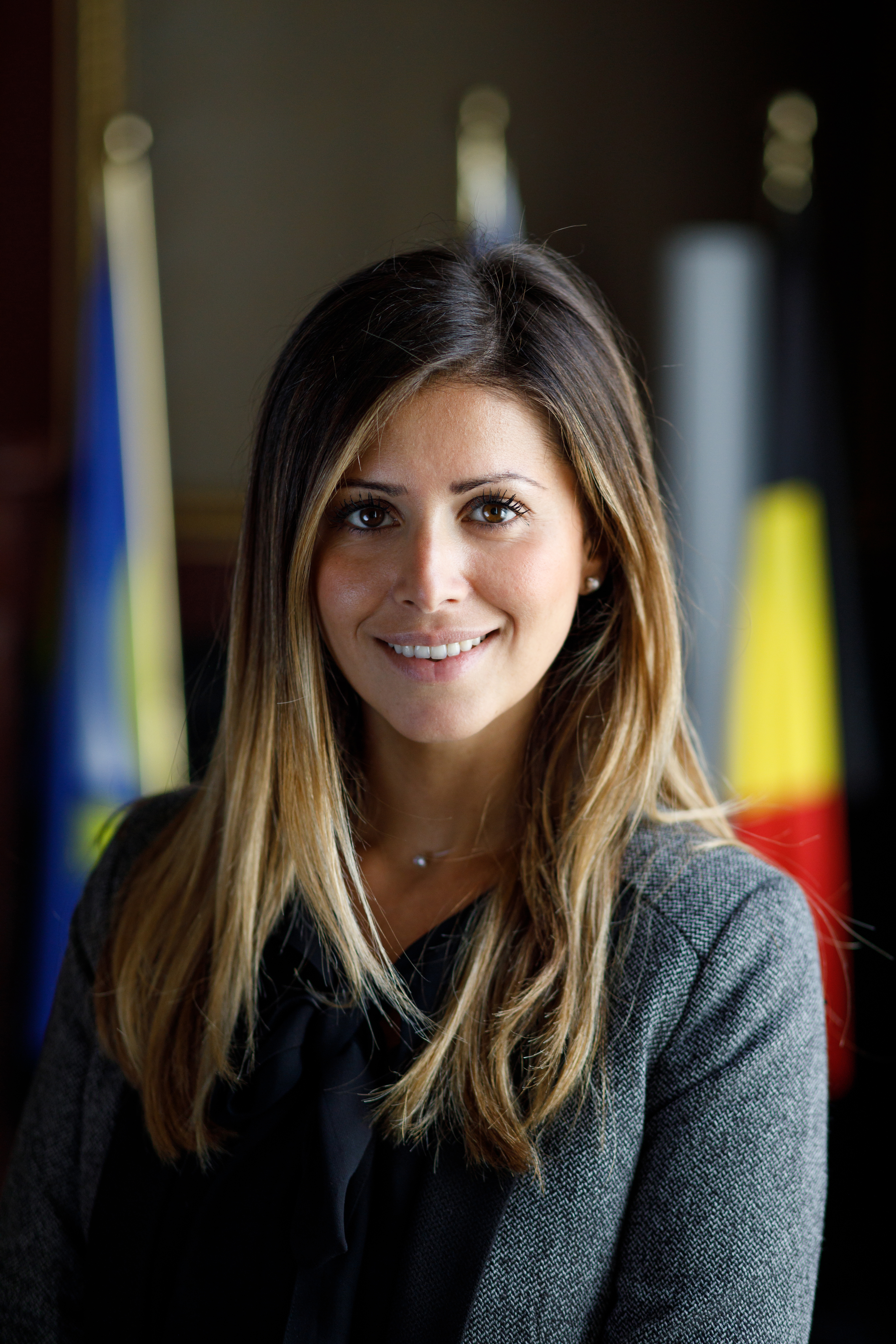
Nawal Ben Hamou, politician

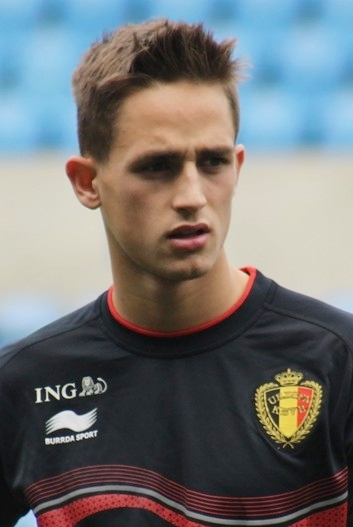
Adnan Januzaj, football player

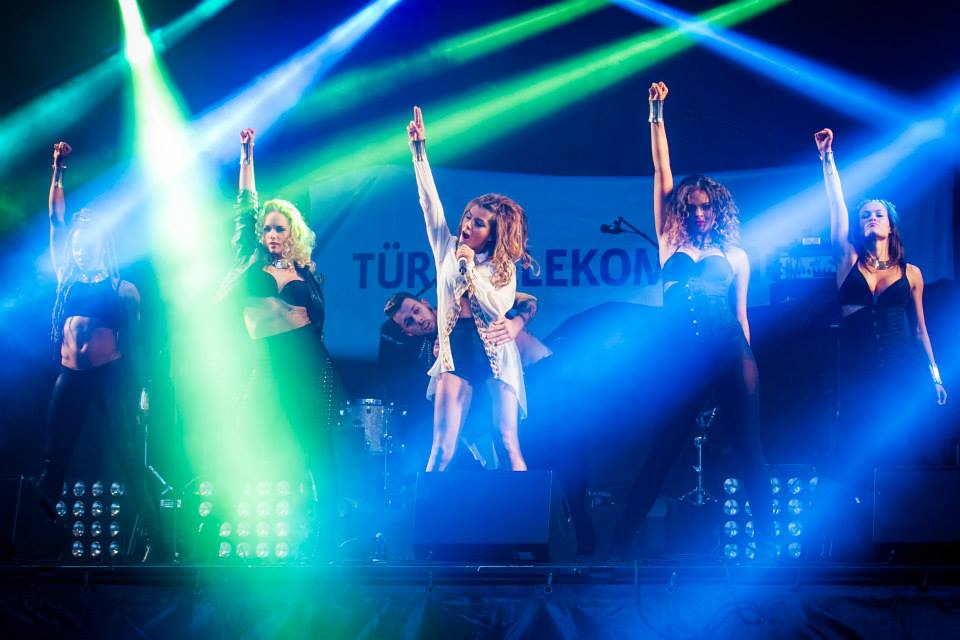
Funda Kılıç, singer

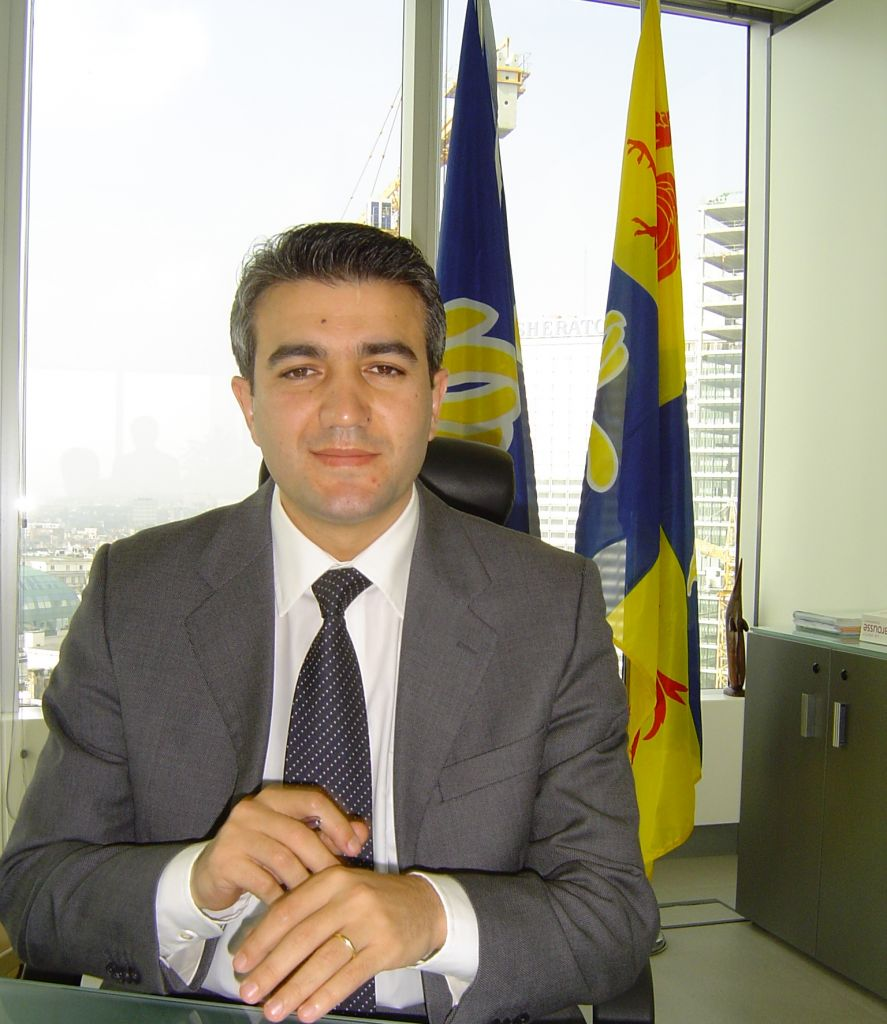
Emir Kir, Mayor of Saint-Josse-ten-Noode

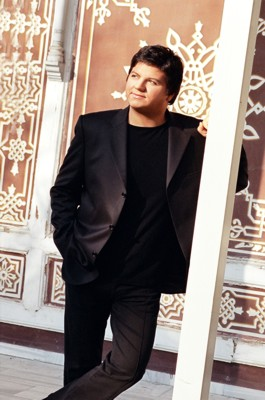
Kubat, singer

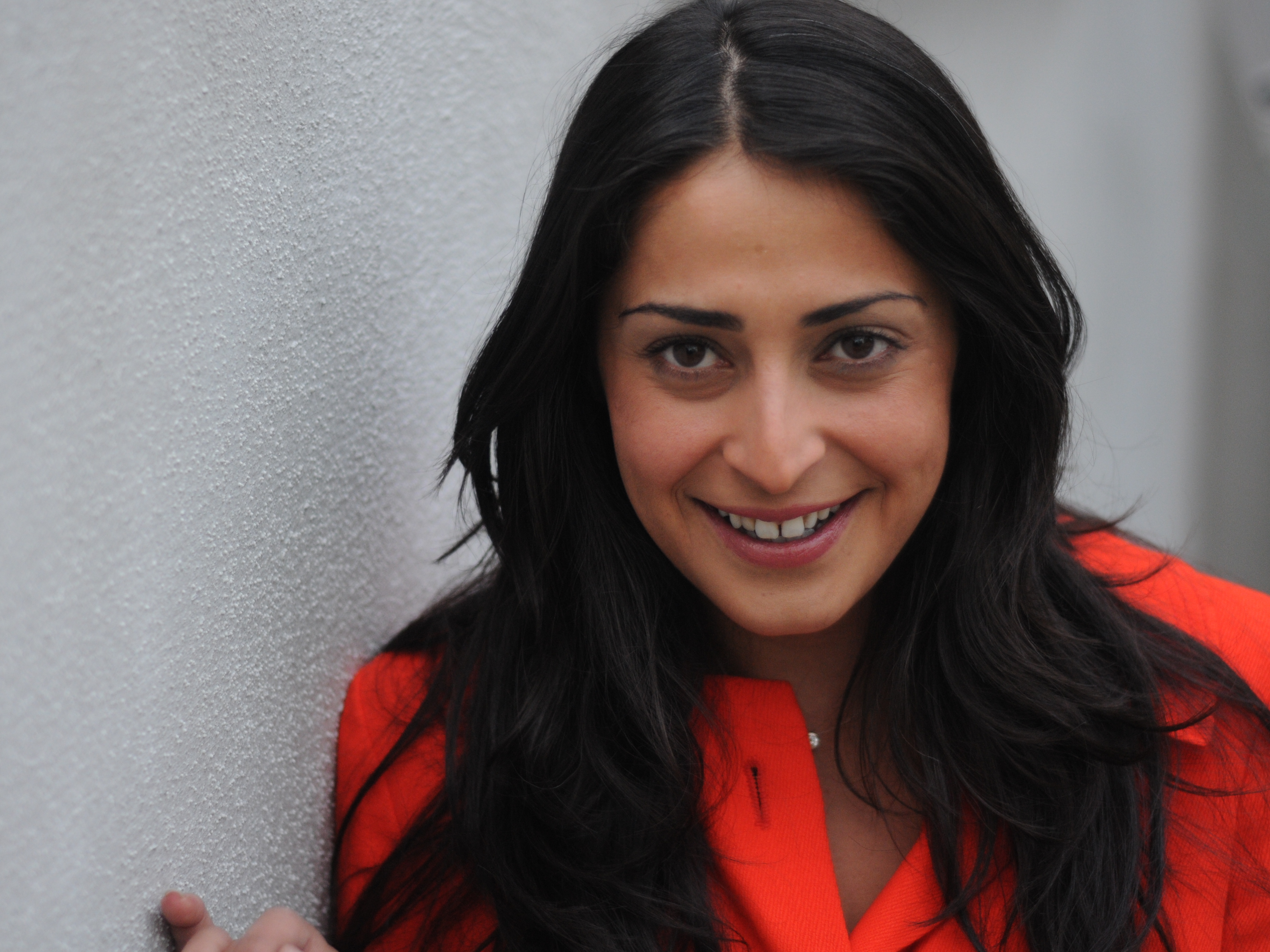
Özlem Özen, politician

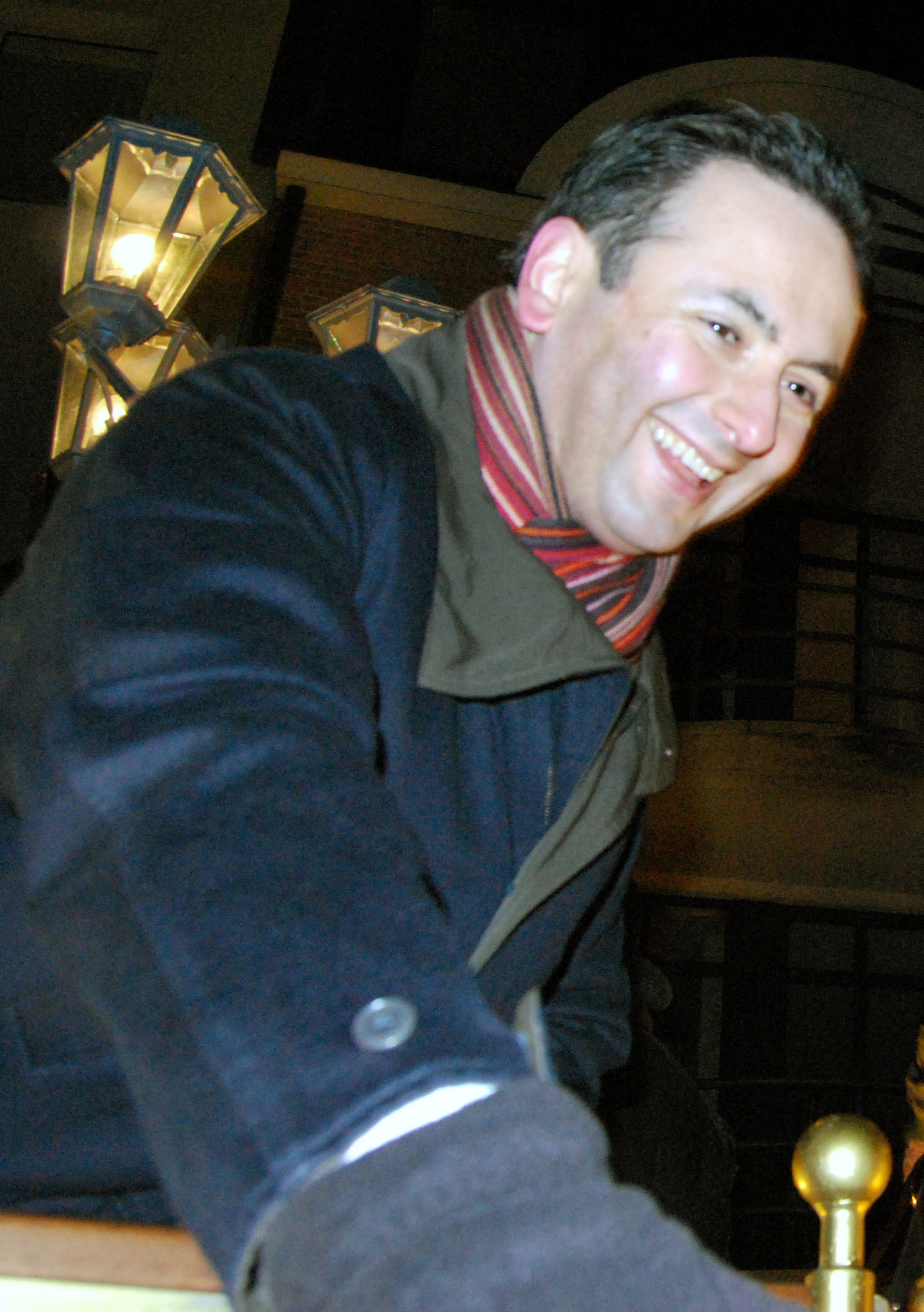
Faroek Özgünes, TV presenter and journalist

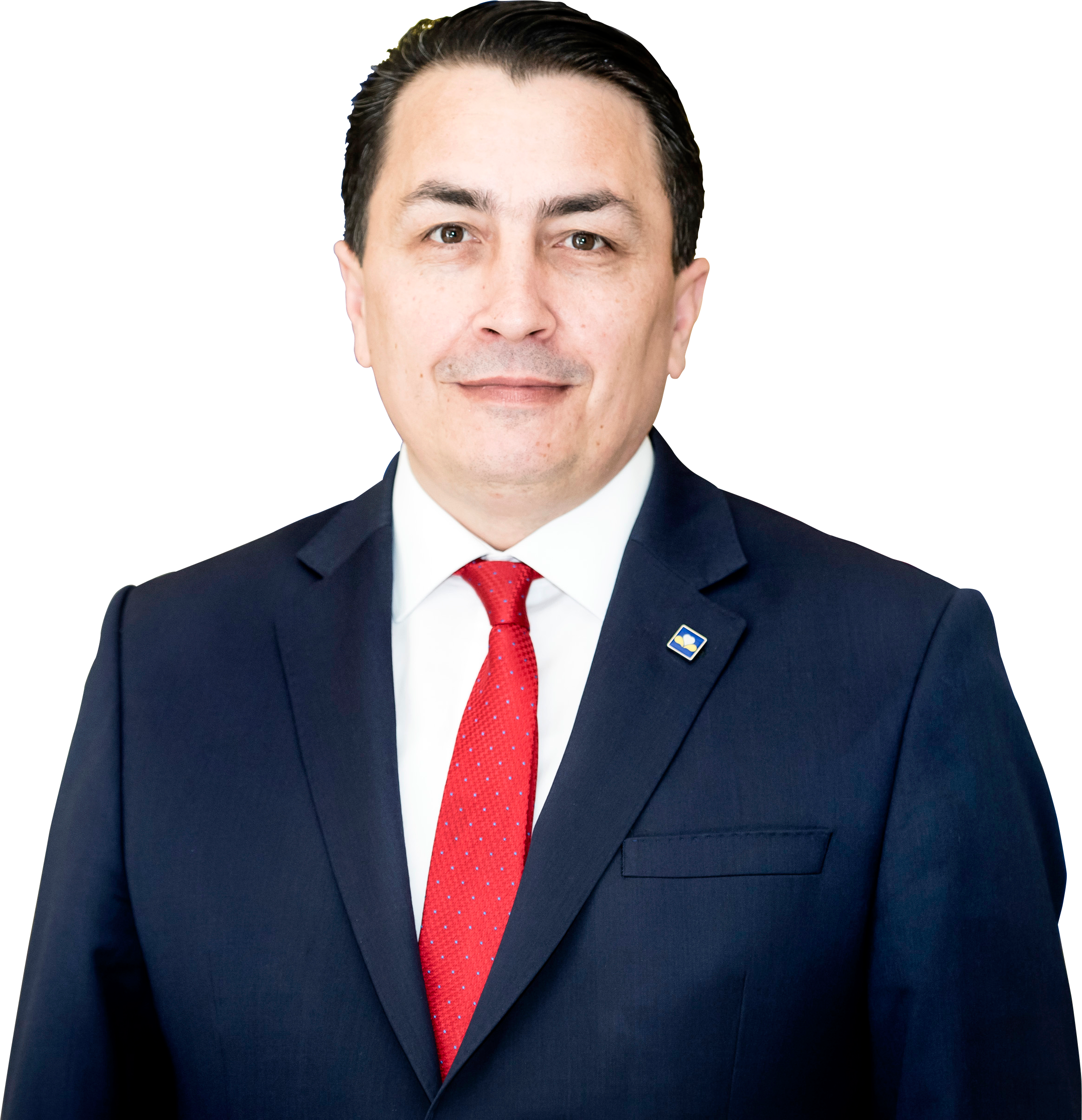
Emin Özkara, politician

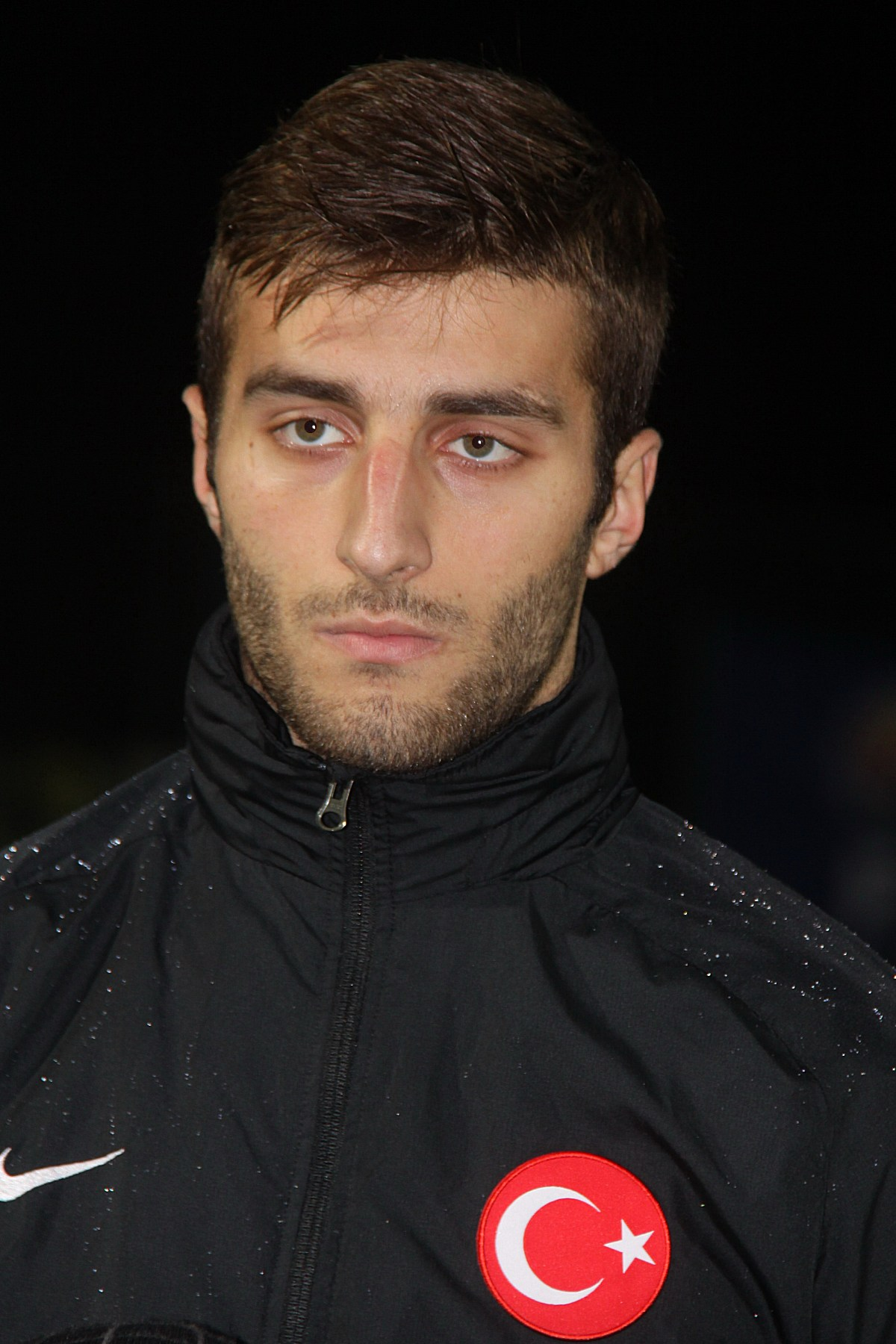
Alpaslan Öztürk, football player

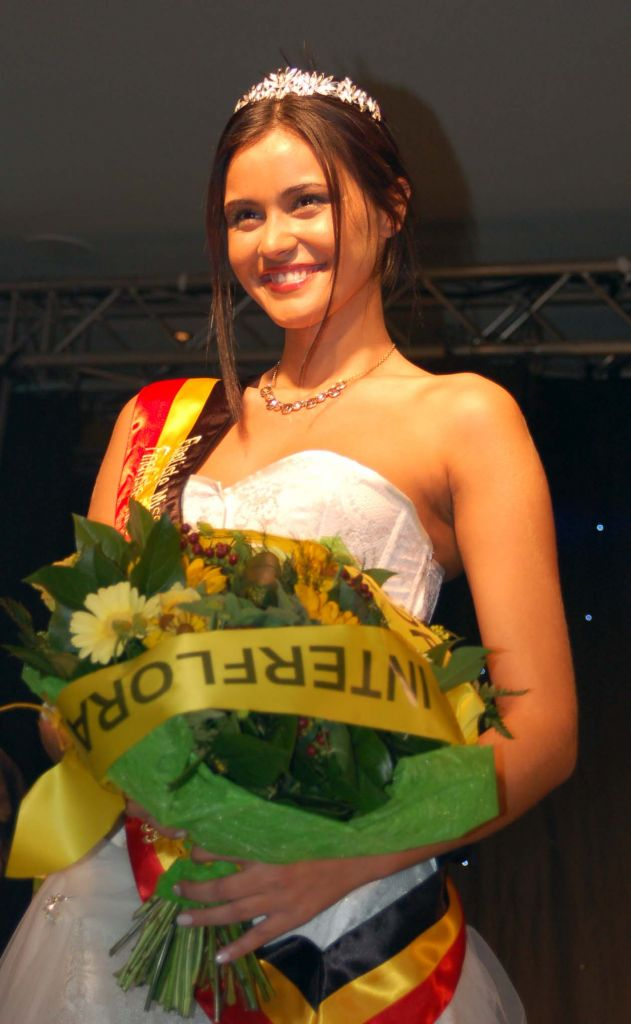
Zeynep Sever, Miss Belgium 2009

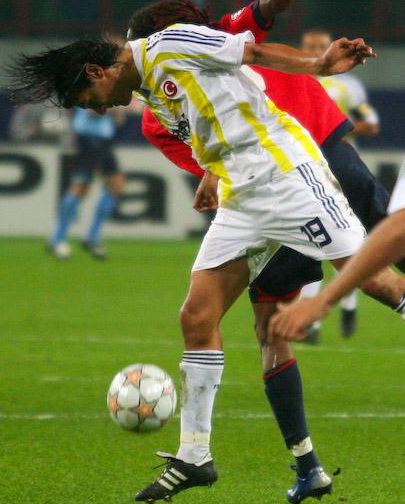
Önder Turacı, footballer

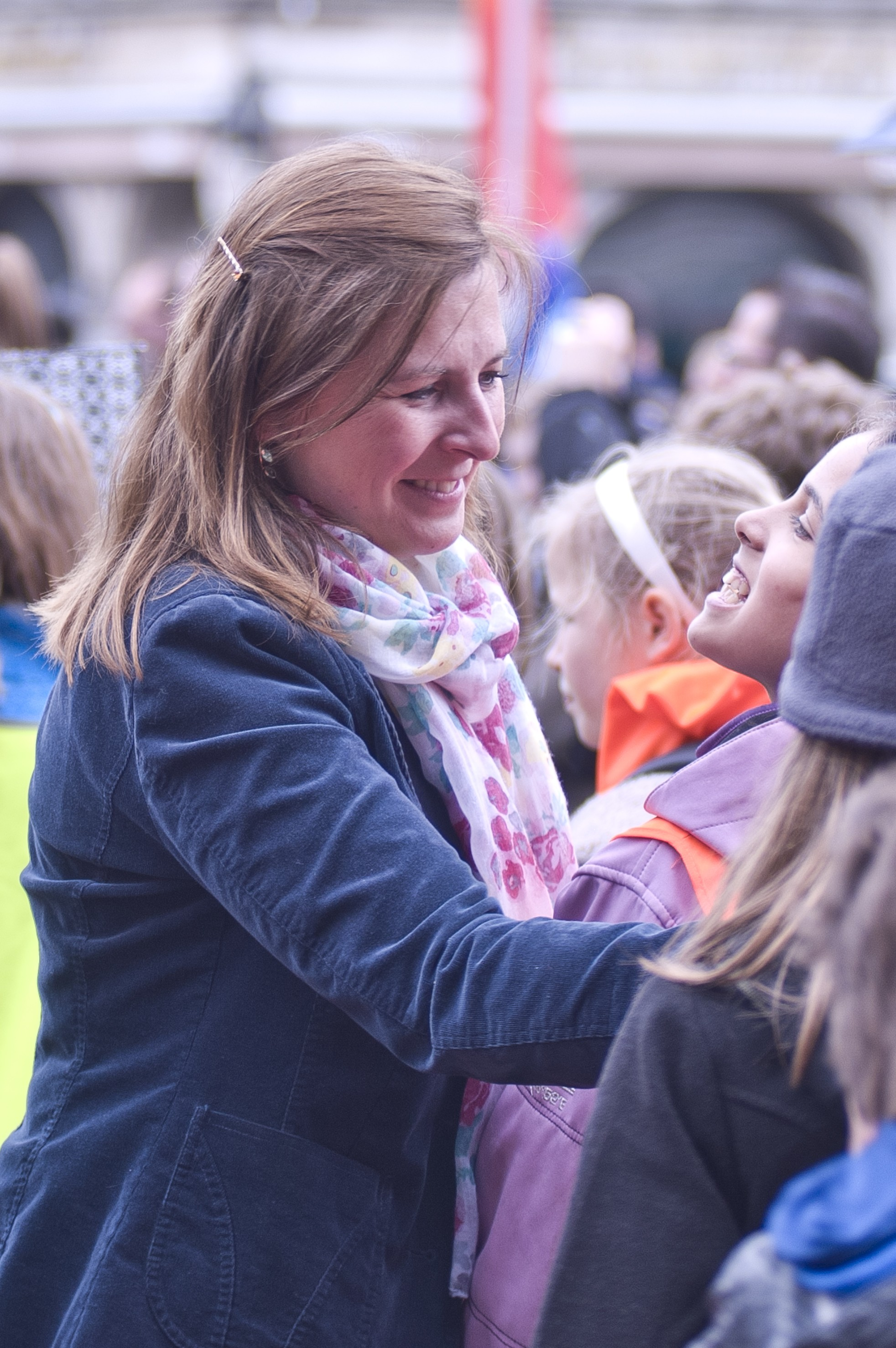
Güler Turan, politician and lawyer

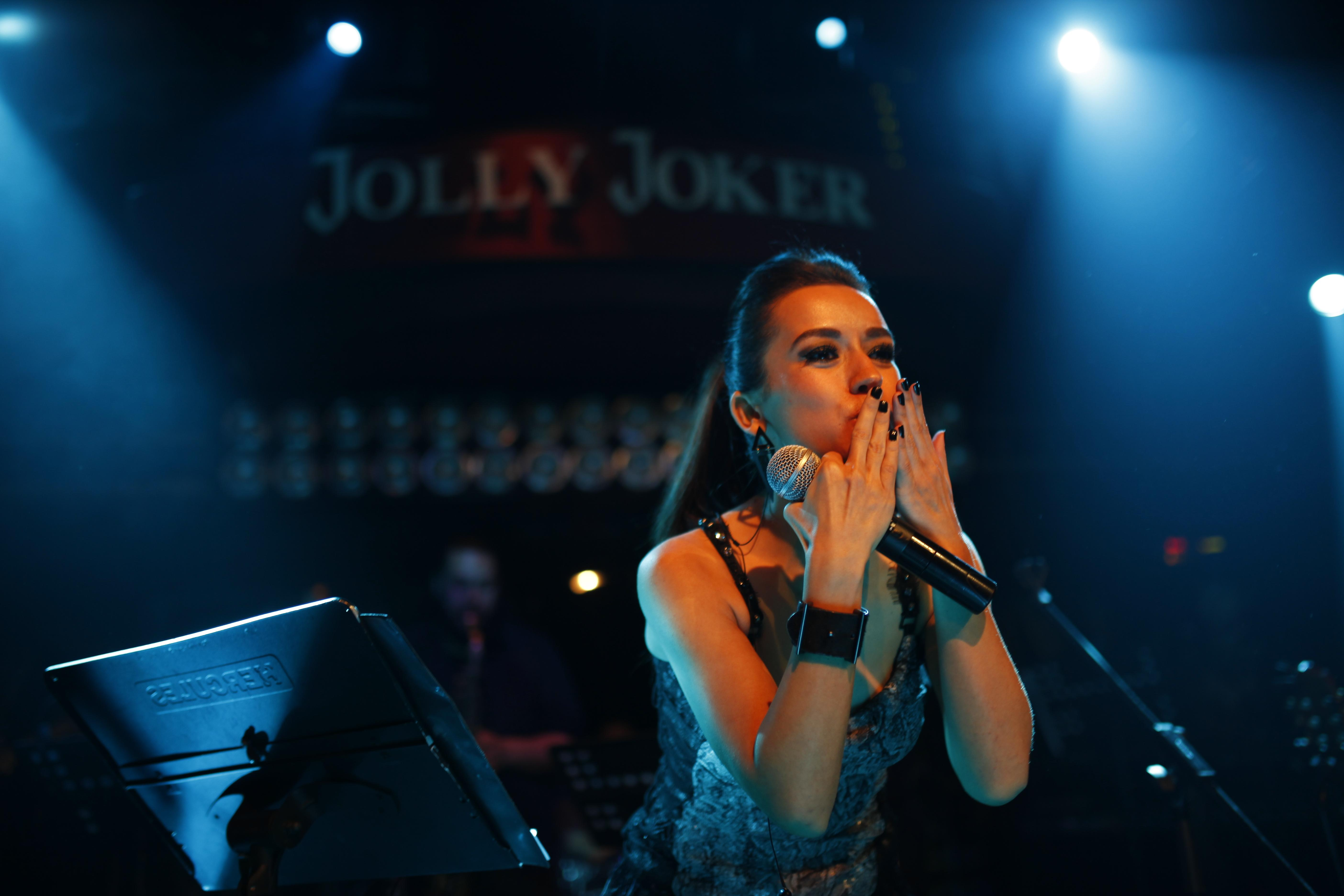
Tuğba Yurt, singer

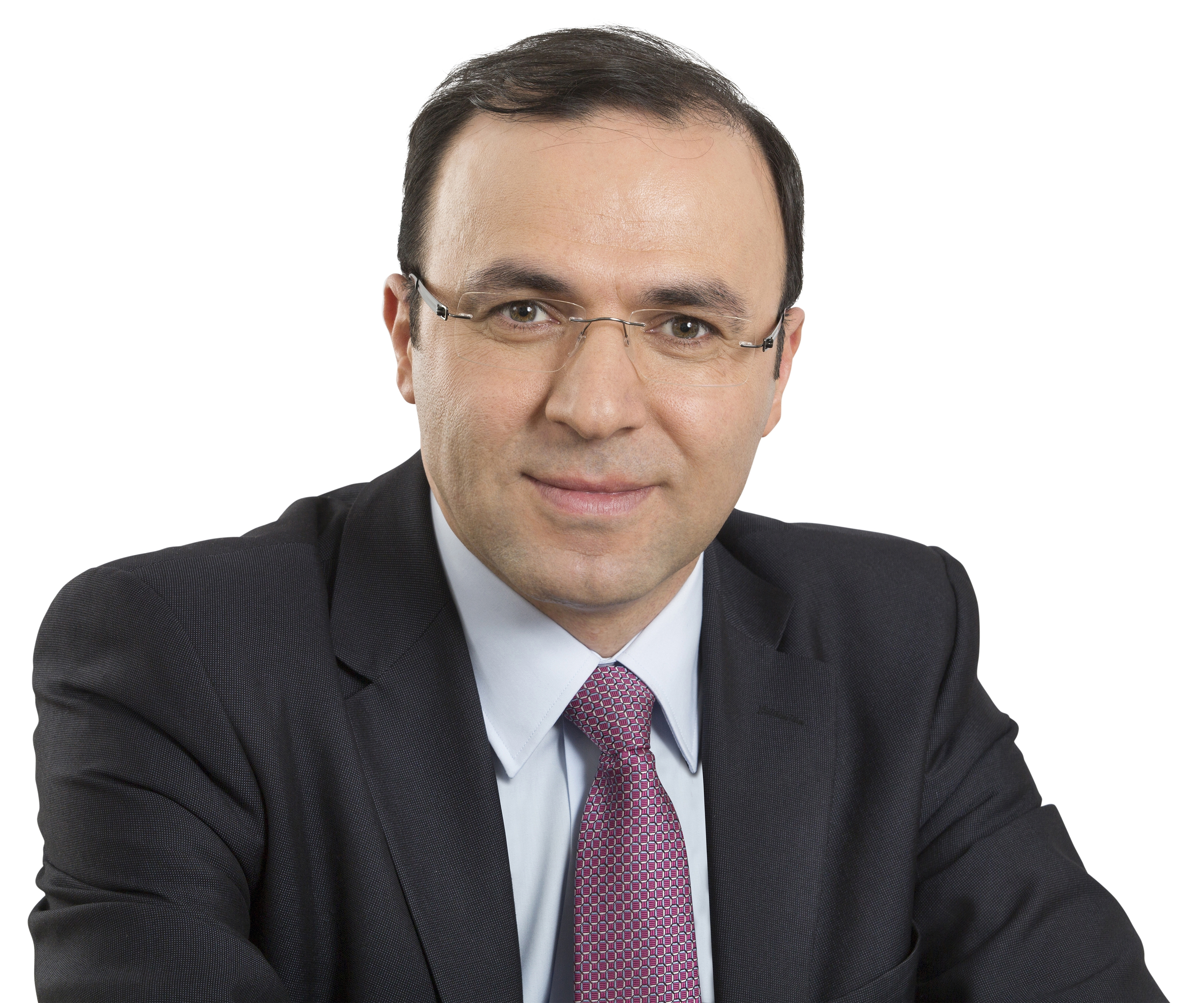
Veli Yüksel, politician and author

== See also ==
- List of Turkish Belgians
- Islam in Belgium
- Belgium–Turkey relations
- Turks in Europe
  - Turks in France
  - Turks in Germany
  - Turks in the Netherlands

== Bibliography ==
- Akgündüz, Ahmet (2008), Labour Migration from Turkey to Western Europe, 1960-1974: A Multidisciplinary Analysis, Ashgate Publishing, ISBN 978-0-7546-7390-3
- Avramov, Dragana; Cliquet, R.L. (2005), Integrated Policies on Gender Relations, Ageing and Migration in Europe, Garant, ISBN 90-441-1728-9.
- Blommaert, Jan; Verschueren, Jef (1998), Debating Diversity: Analysing the Discourse of Tolerance, Routledge, ISBN 0-415-19138-6.
- Cohen, Robin (1995), The Cambridge Survey of World Migration, Cambridge University Press, ISBN 0-521-44405-5
- Fitzmaurice, John (1996), The Politics of Belgium: A Unique Federalism, C. Hurst & Co. Publishers, ISBN 1-85065-209-0
- Gailly, A (1997), "Turkish Immigrants in Belgium", in Al-Issa, Ihsan; Tousignant, Michel (eds.), Ethnicity, Immigration, and Psychopathology, Springer, ISBN 0306454793
- Kasaba, Reşat (2008), The Cambridge History of Turkey, Cambridge University Press, ISBN 978-0-521-62096-3.
- Kaya, Ayhan; Kentel, Ferhat (2007), Belgian-Turks A Bridge or a Breach between Turkey and the European Union? (PDF), King Baudouin Foundation, ISBN 978-90-5130-587-6, archived from the original (PDF) on 2008-06-26
- King Baudouin Foundation (2008), Turkish communities and the EU (PDF), King Baudouin Foundation, archived from the original (PDF) on 2009-02-25
- Koutroubas, Theodoros; Vloeberghs, Ward; Yanasmayan, Zeynep (2009), "Political, Religious and Ethnic Radicalisation Among Muslims in Belgium", in Emerson, Michael; Roy, Olivier (eds.), Ethno-Religious Conflict in Europe: Typologies of Radicalisation in Europe's Muslim Communities, CEPS, ISBN 978-9290798224
- Levinson, David (1998), Ethnic Groups Worldwide: A Ready Reference Handbook, Greenwood Publishing Group, ISBN 1-57356-019-7
- Moutsou, Christina (2006), "Merging European Boundaries: A Stroll in Brussels", in Stacul, Jaro; Moutsou, Christina; Kopnina, Helen (eds.), Crossing European Boundaries: Beyond Conventional Geographical Categories, Berghahn Books, ISBN 1-84545-150-3.
- Musterd, Sako; Ostendorf, W.J.M.; Breebaart, Matthijs (1998), Multi-ethnic Metropolis: Patterns and Policies, Springer, ISBN 0-7923-4854-0.
- Nielsen, Jørgen (2004), Muslims in Western Europe, Edinburgh University Press, ISBN 0-7486-1844-9.
- Organisation for Economic Co-operation and Development (2001), Trends in International Migration: Continuous Reporting System on Migration. 25th annual report, 2000 Edition, OECD Publishing, ISBN 92-64-18612-3.
- Organisation for Economic Co-operation and Development (2008), International Migration Outlook: SOPEMI 2008, OECD Publishing, ISBN 978-92-64-04565-1.
- Rose, Arnold (1969), Migrants in Europe, University of Minnesota Press, ISBN 0-8166-0542-4.
- State, Paul (2004), Historical Dictionary of Brussels, Scarecrow Press, ISBN 0-8108-5075-3.
- Timmerman, Christiane (2004), "When Tradition Becomes Fashionable: The Case of Young Turkish Women in Belgium", in Diedrich, Maria; Cook, Theron; Lindo, Flip (eds.), Crossing Boundaries: African American Inner City and European Migrant Youth, LIT Verlag Berlin-Hamburg-Münster, ISBN 3-8258-7231-9
- Timmerman, Christiane; Van der Heyden, Katrien (2005), "Turkish and Moroccan Newcomers in Flanders", in De Smedt, Helma (ed.), Unexpected Approaches to the Global Society, Garant, ISBN 90-441-1773-4
- Wets, Johan (March 2006), "The Turkish Community in Austria and Belgium: The Challenge of Integration" (PDF), Turkish Studies, 7 (1), Routledge: 85–100, doi:10.1080/14683840500520600, S2CID 144525781
- Yanasmayan, Zeynep (2010), "Role of Turkish Islamic Organizations in Belgium: The Strategies of Diyanet and Milli Görüs" (PDF), Insight Turkey, 12 (1): 139–161, archived from the original (PDF) on 2016-03-04
