= Belchicken =

Belgian fast food restaurant chain

Belchicken is a Belgian fast food restaurant chain focused on serving fried chicken. It was established in 2019 by Ismaïl Yagli, a Turkish Belgian businessman who split the franchise off from the previously established franchise Chitir Chicken. Belchicken has emerged as a major contender to KFC in the Belgian fried chicken market, and has also expanded to France and Germany.

== Link ==
https://belchicken.com/
