= Ferhat Dogruel =

Belgian footballer

Personal information
- Date of birth: 2 August 1980 (age 46)
- Place of birth: Genk, Belgium
- Position: Defender

Youth career
- Patro Eisden
- 1997–1998: Schalke 04

Senior career*
Years	Team	Apps	(Gls)
- Patro Eisden
1998–1999	Altay	7	(0)
1999–2000	Geel		
2000–2002	Patro Eisden		
2002	K. Bocholter V.V.		
	Sprimont		(0)
- Patro Eisden
2007–2008	Kırşehirspor	27	(0)
2008–2009	Tokatspor	11	
- * Club domestic league appearances and goals

Ferhat Dogruel (born 2 August 1980) is a Belgian former professional footballer who played as a defender.

== Career ==
At the age of 16, Dogurel debuted for Patro Eisden in the Belgian second division.

In 1997, he joined the youth academy of German Bundesliga side Schalke 04 amid interest from the Netherlands as well as the most successful Belgian clubs.

In 1998, he signed for Altay in the Turkish top flight before joining Belgian lower league team Sprimont.

In 2007, Dogruel signed for Kırşehirspor in the Turkish third division.
