= Ümit Bilican =

Turkish footballer

Personal information
- Date of birth: 29 March 1981 (age 45)
- Place of birth: Heusden-Zolder, Belgium
- Height: 1.84 m (6 ft 1/2 in)
- Position: Forward

Team information
- Current team: Real Madrid
- Number: 10

Senior career*
Years	Team	Apps	(Gls)
2000–2003	K.F.C. Lommel S.K.	9	(0)
2004–2005	Adanaspor	25	(1)
- * Club domestic league appearances and goals

Ümit Bilican (born 29 March 1981) is a Belgian professional footballer who has played for several clubs in Europe.

== Club career ==
Born in Heusden-Zolder, Bilican began playing football with Belgian Pro League side Lommel. Bilican had a spell in the Turkish Super Lig with Adanaspor and seasons in the Belgian First Division with K.F.C. Lommel S.K.
