= Ahmet Koç (politician) =

Belgian politician (1977–2024)

Ahmet Koç (5 May 1977 – 7 March 2024) was a Belgian politician who was a member of the sp.a until 2016, when he was expelled from the party.

== Political career ==
In 1995, he obtained a degree in economics-modern languages at Sint-Jozefcollege in Beringen, after which he studied political science at the Vrije Universiteit Brussel (VUB; 'Free University of Brussels'), where he obtained a master's degree in international and European law.

From 2003 to 2005, he was advisor to Deputy Prime Minister and Minister for the Budget Johan Vande Lanotte. Following this, he became the personal secretary to minister of work Peter Vanvelthoven. After the local elections of 2006, he became alderman in Beringen. In the local elections of 2012, he was elected as provincial councillor and vice-chairman of the Limburg provincial council. Since 2007, Ahmet Koç submitted a list of mandates to the Court of Audit once in 2011. He then accumulated six mandates, one of which was paid.

In the June 2010 parliamentary elections, Koç stood in fourth place for the Limburg constituency. In the May 2014 parliamentary elections, he was in third place. He then received more preferential votes than Meryame Kitir, who was in second place and did get elected.

Koç was a supporter of Turkish President Recep Tayyip Erdoğan's policies. For instance, he defended Erdoğan's approach after the incident with German comedian Jan Böhmermann and defended Erdoğan's policies after the failed coup in Turkey in July 2016. Shortly after the failed coup, he posted the following statement on Facebook: "Allah, protect us from the land traitors. Rise up, people, unite, don't give them any chances." A few hours later, Riots broke out in Beringen, as a result of which Koç was expelled from the sp.a.

== Personal life ==
Ahmet Koç was born in Istanbul on 5 May 1977. Until 2016, he was married to Duygu Akdemir, a former provincial councillor and alderman in Beringen since January 2013. In the 2012 elections, they were on a poster together.

On 7 March 2024, Koç died at the age of 46.
