= Murat Akın =

Belgian footballer

Murat Akin
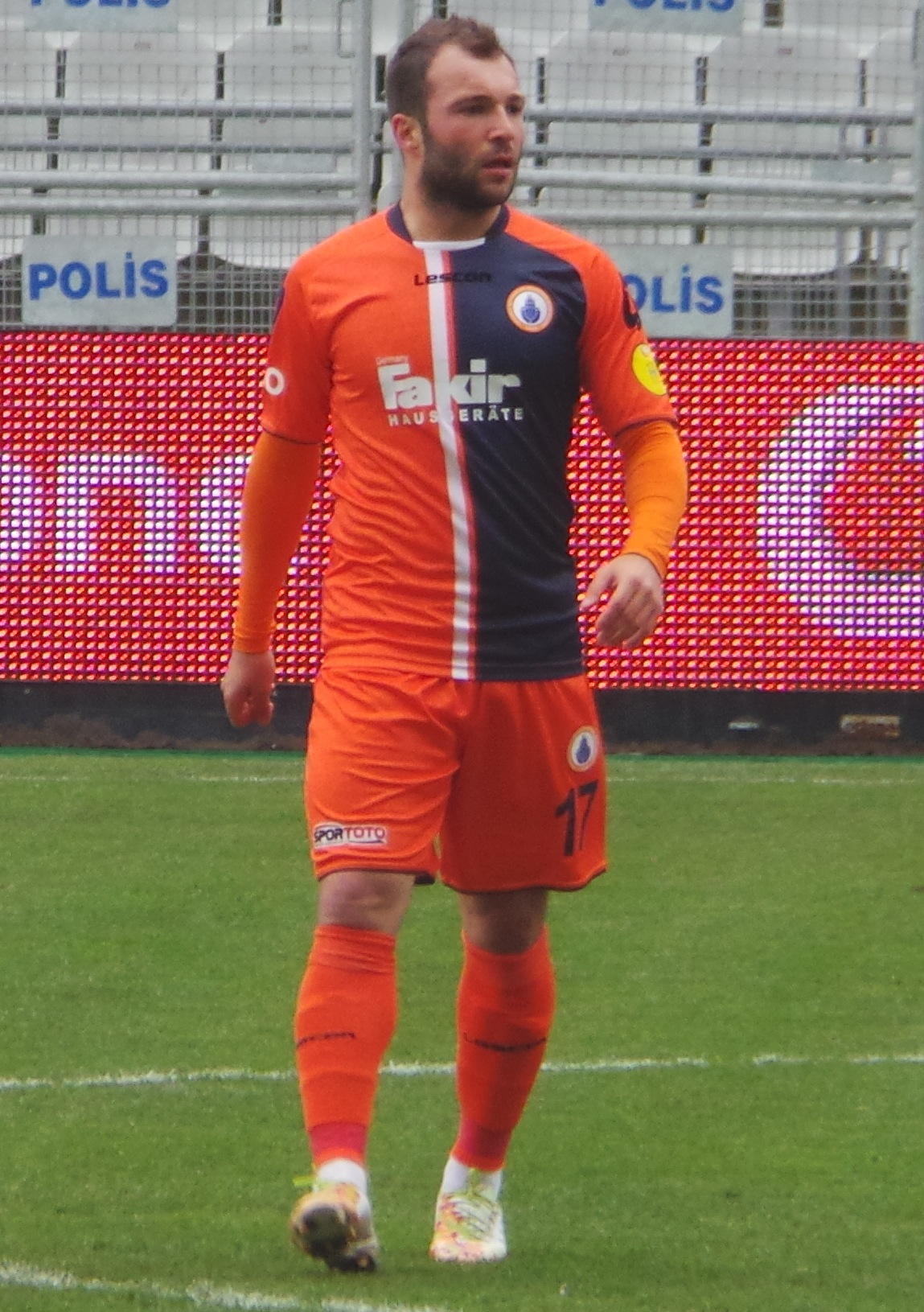

Personal information
- Date of birth: 22 October 1986 (age 40)
- Place of birth: Sint-Niklaas, Belgium
- Height: 1.74 m (5 ft 9 in)
- Position: Midfielder

Team information
- Current team: Fatih Karagümrük (sporting director)

Youth career
- KSK Beveren

Senior career*
Years	Team	Apps	(Gls)
2005–2006	KSK Beveren	2	(0)
2006–2008	Sportkring Sint-Niklaas	58	(20)
2008–2012	Kasımpaşa	91	(6)
2010–2011	→ Orduspor (loan)	30	(5)
2012–2013	Antalyaspor	1	(0)
2013	Konyaspor	18	(1)
2013–2014	Kayseri Erciyesspor	15	(0)
2014–2015	İstanbul Başakşehir	17	(2)
2015	→ Kayserispor (loan)	14	(2)
2015–2016	Karabükspor	30	(8)
2016–2017	FC Wil	16	(2)
2017	Göztepe	16	(2)
2017–2018	Sakaryaspor	15	(2)
2018	Karabükspor	14	(1)
2018–2019	Adana Demirspor	4	(0)
- * Club domestic league appearances and goals as of 19:12, 27 August 2019 (UTC)

Murat Akin (born 22 October 1986) is a Belgian former footballer who is currently the sporting director of Turkish club Fatih Karagümrük.
