= Cüneyt Vicil =

Turkish-Belgian futsal player

Cüneyt Vicil (born January 4, 1980, in La Louvière, Belgium) is a Turkish-Belgian futsal player who plays for Paraske Bowl Morlanwelz since 2003 as a goalkeeper.

He is a member of the Turkey national futsal team in the UEFA Futsal Championship.
