= Yunus Gülnar =

Belgian footballer (born 1997)

Personal information
- Full name: Yunus Gülnar
- Date of birth: 1 January 1997 (age 29)
- Place of birth: Genk, Belgium
- Height: 1.74 m (5 ft 9 in)
- Position: Attacking midfielder

Youth career
- RKC Genk
- 2010–2011: Beşiktaş
- Atlético Madrid

Senior career*
Years	Team	Apps	(Gls)
2014–2015	Čelik Zenica		
2015–2017	Kahramanmaraşspor		
2017	Vëllaznimi Gjakova		
- * Club domestic league appearances and goals as of 1 January 1997

Yunus Gülnar (born 1 January 1997 in Genk, Belgium) is a Belgium professional football midfielder who last played for KF Vëllaznimi.

== Playin career ==
Gülnar played with the Beşiktaş J.K. U-14 team in the 2010–11 season. Between August 2015 and end of May 2017, he was in contract with Turkish side Kahramanmaraşspor
