= Tuğba Yurt =

Turkish singer (born 1987)

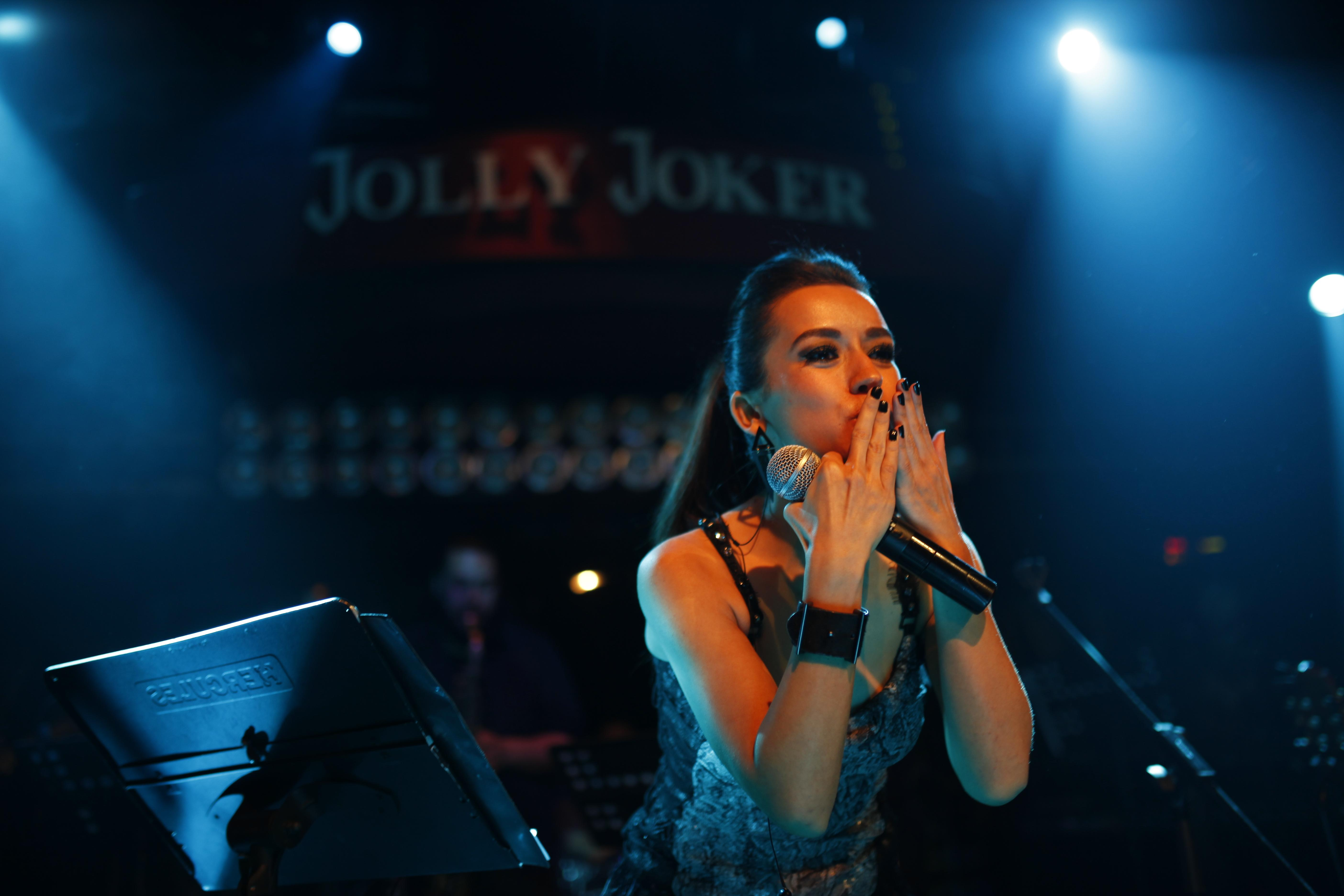
- Yurt in April 2015

Background information
- Born: 2 September 1987 (age 39); Belgium
- Genre: Pop
- Occupation: Singer
- Instruments: Viola
- Years active: 2013–present
- Label: DMC

Tuğba Yurt (born 2 September 1987) is a Turkish singer.

== Early life ==
Yurt was born in Belgium, due to her father's work there, but her family returned to Gemlik in the Bursa Province when she was only eight months old. She studied at the Bursa Uludağ University.

== Career ==
On 30 April 2014, a revised version of the song "Sakin Ol" was released with Yurt as the singer and Doğukan Manço serving as the composer and arranger. It was originally released in 1994 by Sertab Erener and was written and composed by Sezen Aksu and Uzay Hepari. The new music video was directed by Kemal Başbuğ and Ahmet Kural, Murat Cemcir other actors from the movie Kardeş Payı were featured in the video which was watched more than 120 million times on YouTube, becoming one of the most viewed video clips in Turkey in 2014. Later that year on 2 September, Yurt released a new music video for the song "Aşk Sanmışız" which was written and composed by Gökhan Özen. In summer 2015, on 27 May, she released her new song "Oh Oh" under the label DMC. It was written and composed by Sezen Aksu. Serkan Balkan arranged the single, while David Şaboy created the remix version. The shooting of the music video was done by Mustafa Özen on the platoon inside the Beykoz Kundura Factory. A cast member of 85 people accompanied Yurt during the shooting. In 2015, her new single "Aklımda Sorular Var" was produced and published by DMC. Osman Hekimoğlu wrote the song and Ender Çabuker served as its composer. Murad Küçük directed the music video for"Aklımda Sorular Var" which was shot at the Atatürk Arboretum. Later that year, Yurt released another single titled "Güç Bende Artık". It was written by Onurr and Alper Narman and Murat Joker directed its music video. In March 2017, her new single "Destur", written by Deniz Erten and composed by Toylan Kaya, was released. Yurt then continued her career with the singles "İnceden İnceden" (2017), "Yine Sev Yine" (2018), and "Masal" (2018), before releasing her first studio album, Sığınak, in November 2019.

== Personal life ==
Yurt was in a relationship with the footballer, Cenk Şahin, until January 2020.

== Discography ==
Albums

Year	Title	Producer
2019	Sığınak	DMC

EPs

Year	Title	Producer
2013	Aşk'a Emanet	3 Adım Müzik

Singles

Year	Title	Producer
2014	"Sakin Ol!"	Emre Müzik
2014	"Aşk Sanmışız"	3 Adım Müzik
2015	"Oh Oh"	DMC
2015	"Aklımda Sorular Var"	DMC
2016	"Güç Bende Artık"	DMC
2017	"Destur"	DMC
2017	"İnceden İnceden"	DMC
2018	"Yine Sev Yine"	DMC
2018	"Masal"	DMC
2019	"Vurkaç" (Acoustic)	DMC
2021	"Benim O"	DMC
2021	"Açmayalım"	DMC
2022	"Ne Mesele"	DMC
2023	"Sonsuza Dek"	DMC
2024	"Dünya Hevesi"	DMC
2024	"Yolun Sonu"	DMC
2025	"Bu Son Olacak"	2U Production
2025	"Duymuyor Beni"	2U Production
2025	"Benden Geç Yarim"	2U Production
2025	"Dertli Kalem"	2U Production
2025	"Geri Geldim"	2U Production

Music videos

Year	Title	Director
2013	Ağır Yaralı	Lara Sayılgan
2014	Sakin Ol	Kemal Başbuğ
2014	Aşk Sanmışız	Kemal Başbuğ
2015	Oh Oh	Mustafa Özen
2015	Aklımda Sorular Var	Murad Küçük
2016	Güç Bende Artık	Murat Joker
2017	Destur	Murat Joker
2017	İnceden İnceden	Murat Joker
2018	Yine Sev Yine	Gülşen Aybaba
2018	Masal	Murat Joker
2019	Vurkaç	Elif Demiralp & Burak Kılıçkaya
2019	Güller Ülkesi Damascena (Film Müziği)	Erkan Nas
2020	Yas	Tuğba Yurt
2020	Taş Yürek	Mustafa Özen
2020	Geliyo Geliyo	Mustafa Özen
2020	Sığınak	Mustafa Özen
2021	Benim O	Murat Joker
2021	Açmayalım	Gülşen Aybaba
2022	Ne Mesele	Eren Yıldız
2024	Dünya Hevesi	Melike Beşli
2024	Yolun Sonu	Halil Güzel
2025	Bu Son Olacak	Safa Gülsoy
2025	Duymuyor Beni	Safa Gülsoy
2025	Benden Geç Yarim	Safa Gülsoy
2025	Dertli Kalem	Safa Gülsoy
2025	Geri Geldim	Safa Gülsoy
