= Nawal Ben Hamou =

Belgian politician (born 1987)

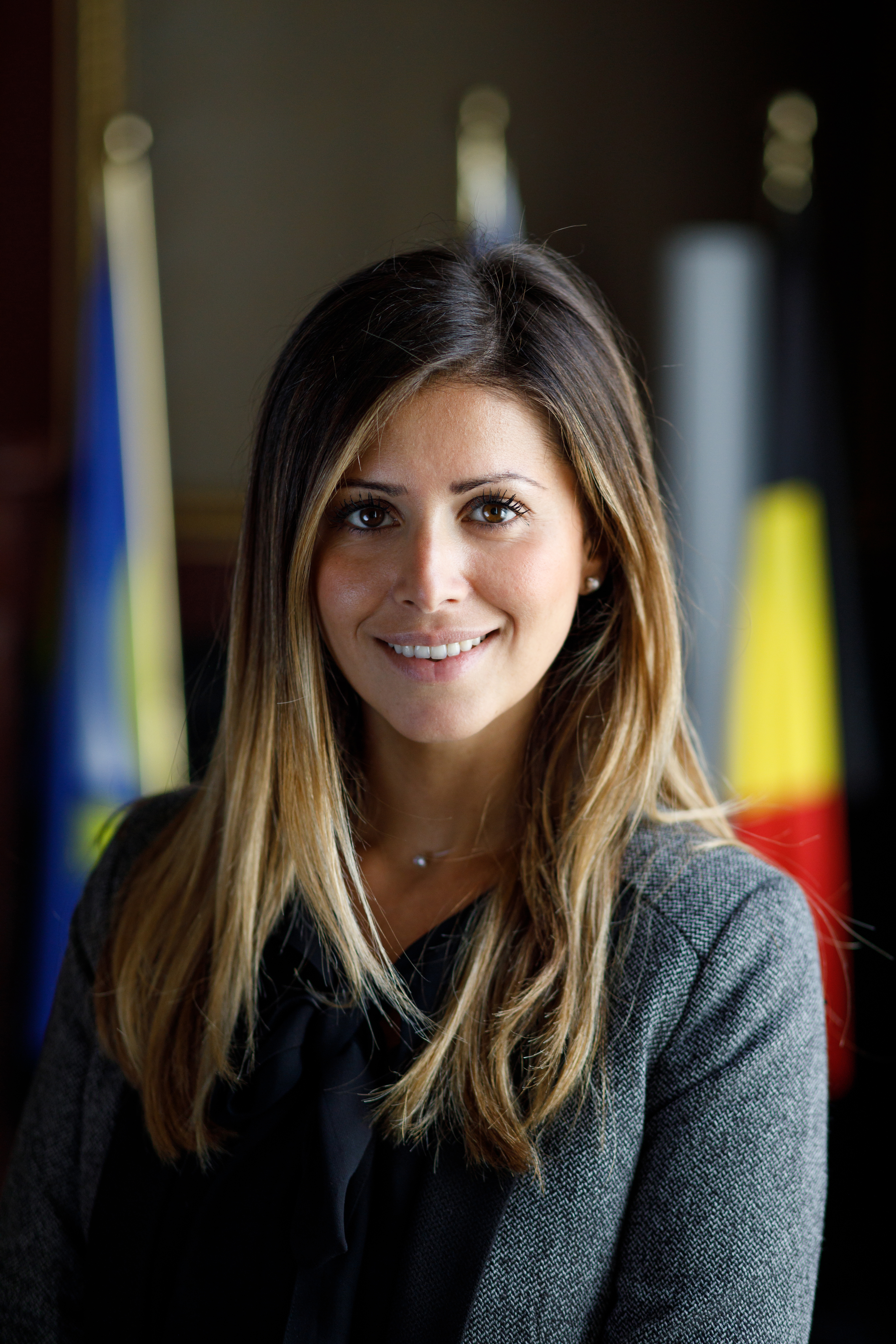
- Ben Hamou in 2019

Member of the Chamber of Representatives
- In office 19 June 2014 – 25 April 2019
- Constituency: Brussels

Personal details
- Born: 11 June 1987 (age 38)
- Party: Socialist Party

Nawal Ben Hamou (born 11 June 1987) is a Belgian politician serving as secretary of state for housing and equal opportunities of Brussels and minister for social cohesion and sports in the French Community Commission since 2019. From 2014 to 2019, she was a member of the Chamber of Representatives.
