= Miss Belgium 2017 =

- Date: January 14, 2017
- Presenters: Patrick Ridremont; Véronique De Kock
- Venue: Plopsaland Theater, De Panne, Belgium
- Broadcaster: AB3; FOX België
- Entrants: 30
- Placements: 12
- Winner: Romanie Schotte; West Flanders
- Congeniality: Charlotte Rau; West Flanders

Miss Belgium 2017 the 49th Miss Belgium pageant, held on January 14, 2017 at the Plopsaland Theater in De Panne, Belgium.

The winner, Romanie Schotte from West Flanders, was crowned by the outgoing title holder, Lenty Frans, Miss Belgium 2016.

Romanie Schotte represented Belgium at Miss World 2017. The first runner up, Liesbeth Claus entered Miss Universe 2017.

== Official contestants ==
30 candidates competed for the title:

Province	Contestant	Age	Hometown
Antwerp	Élisabeth Van Dijk	23	Geel
Antwerp	Aïcha Tytgat	21	Antwerp
Antwerp	Rosmine Bahizi	22	Antwerp
Brussels	Myriam Sahili	19	Molenbeek-Saint-Jean
Brussels	Selin Yürük	18	Schaerbeek
East Flanders	Jennifer Roberechts	18	Alost
East Flanders	Liesbeth Claus	19	Assenede
East Flanders	Maïthé Rivera Armayones	18	Lebbeke
Flemish Brabant	Anjejoline Stevens	23	Landen
Hainaut	Amandine Charlier	18	Fleurus
Hainaut	Aurélie Vannerom	23	Frameries
Hainaut	Noémie Depré	19	Fontaine-l'Évêque
Hainaut	Sofia Bouhadjar	24	Haine-Saint-Pierre
Liège	Eva Mira	18	Saint-Nicolas
Limburg	Déborah Schols	20	Sint-Truiden
Limburg	Leentje Jorissen	18	Sint-Truiden
Luxembourg	Élisa Arnould	23	Bouillon
Namur	Cyrielle Greck	23	Éghezée
Namur	Laurie Ledoux	18	Tamines
Walloon Brabant	Raphaëlla Deuringer	18	Waterloo
Walloon Brabant	Shirin Rotty	20	Mont-Saint-Guibert
Walloon Brabant	Cassandre Lamarche	18	Lasne
West Flanders	Charlotte Bulcke	22	Bredene
West Flanders	Charlotte Rau	18	Oostkamp
West Flanders	Delphine Devos	19	Deerlijk
West Flanders	Ellen Bacquaert	21	Oostkamp
West Flanders	Ellen Caen	22	Bruges
West Flanders	Justine Vandenbunder	20	Diksmuide
West Flanders	Kyara Schacht	19	Koksijde
West Flanders	Romanie Schotte	19	Bruges

== Judges ==
The Miss Belgium 2017 final judges were:

- Darline Devos - President of Committee Miss Belgium
- Katherine Kelly Lang - American actress known for her role as Brooke Logan in The Bold and the Beautiful
- Annelies Törös - Miss Belgium 2015
- Laura Beyne - Miss Belgium 2012
- Yfke Sturm - Dutch model
- Mireia Lalaguna - Miss World 2015 from Spain
- Philip Cracco - Belgian owner of the watch brand Rodania
- Olivier Laurent - Belgian imitator and humorist

== Contestant notes ==
- Elisa Arnould, Miss Luxembourg, had finished 1st runner-up of Miss Luxembourg. The holder of this title, Marine Toussaint, was dismissed after the discovery of a live on Facebook in which she would have launched with a friend offensive remarks against several candidates. The result was that it was dethroned by the Miss Belgium Committee. His title was transferred to his first dauphine, Elisa Arnould.
- Rosmine Bahizi, second runner-up of Miss Antwerp, is of Congolese descent.
- Sofia Bouhadjar, Crown Card de Miss Hainaut, is of Italian and Algerian descent.
- Noémie Depré, Miss Hainaut, is of Italian descent.
- Myriam Sahili, Miss Brussels, has dual citizenships Moroccan and Belgian.
- Selin Yürük, first runner-up of Miss Brussels, is of Turkish descent.

== Crossovers ==
Contestants who previously competed at other national beauty pageants:

Miss Italia Charleroi

- 2014: Hainaut: Noémie Depré (Winner)

Miss Italia Belgio

- 2014: Hainaut: Noémie Depré (Winner)

Miss Elegantie

- 2016: Liège: Maïté Rivera Armayones (Winner)

Miss Elegance Belgium

- 2016: Brussels: Selin Yürük (Top 5)

Miss Belgium Limbourg International

- 2014: Limburg: Leentje Jorissen (Winner)

Contestants who previously competed or will be competing at international beauty pageants:

Miss World

- 2017: West Flanders: Romanie Schotte

Miss Universe

- 2017: West Flanders: Liesbeth Claus

Miss Europe Continental

- 2015: Hainaut: Noémie Depré (Top 5 and Miss Modarea)

Miss Teen International

- 2017: Walloon Brabant: Raphaëlla Deuringer
