= Miss Belgium 2015 =

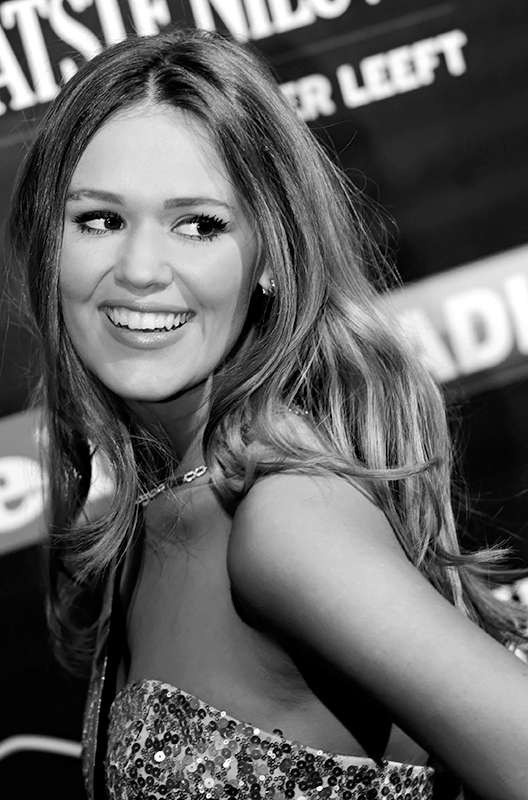
- Annelies Törös, Miss Belgium 2015
- Date: January 10, 2015
- Presenters: Patrick Ridremont and Véronique De Kock
- Venue: Plopsaland Theater de De Panne, Belgium
- Broadcaster: AB3, MENT TV
- Entrants: 30
- Placements: Top 12
- Winner: Annelies Törös; Antwerp
- Congeniality: Kawtar Riahi Idrissi (East Flanders)

Miss Belgium 2015 the 47th Miss Belgium pageant, held on January 10, 2015 at the Plopsaland Theater in De Panne, Belgium. There were 30 contestants representing provinces and municipalities of Belgium.

The winner, Annelies Törös, Miss Antwerp, entered Miss Universe 2015. The first runner up, Leylah Alliët, entered Miss World 2015.

== Winner and runners-up ==
Final Results	Contestant
Miss Belgium 2015	Antwerp – Annelies Törös
1st Runner-up	West Flanders – Leylah Alliët
2nd Runner-up	West Flanders – Charlotte Vanbiervliet
3rd Runner-up	West Flanders – Michèle Roelens
4th Runner-up	Walloon Brabant – Malissia Sirica
5th Runner-up	East Flanders – Nina De Baecke
Semi-finalists	Brussels – Stephanie Bola; Antwerp – Titsia Brabants; Hainaut – Valentine Cesarone; Antwerp – Aurélie Hendrickx; East Flanders – Kawtar Riahi Idrissi; Brussels – Ginger Van Eetvelde

=== Special awards ===
- Miss Congeniality (voted by contestants) – Kawtar Riahi Idrissi (East Flanders)
- Miss Beach Babe – Charlotte Vanbiervlieti (West Flanders)
- Miss Talent – Valentine Cesarone (Hainaut)
- Miss Model – Stephanie Bola (Brussels)
- Miss Elegance – Titsia Brabants (Antwerp)
- Miss Charity – Michèle Roelens (West Flanders)
- Miss Social Media – Titsia Brabants (Antwerp)
- Public Award – Caroline Van Hoye (Brussels)

== Candidates ==
Regional Title	Contestant	Age	Hometown
Crown Card of Miss Antwerp	Valentina Paesano	19	Wilrijk
Miss Luxembourg	Pauline Detroz	22	Hotton
Miss Flemish Brabant	Mandy De Saeger	21	Asse
Miss Hainaut	Valentine Cesarone	21	Mons
1st Runner-up of Miss Antwerp	Aurélie Hendrickx	18	Aartselaar
Contestant of Miss Brussels	Caroline Van Hoye	24	Wezembeek-Oppem
Crown Card of Miss West Flanders	Cheyenne De Coninck	21	Otegem
2nd Runner-up of Miss Brussels	Ginger Van Eetvelde	25	Laeken
Crown Card of Miss Antwerp	Titsia Brabants	21	Mortsel
Crown Card of Miss Brussels	Hélène Gavilan	23	Jette
1st Runner-up of Miss West Flanders	Nina De Baecke	19	Buggenhout
Miss Namur	Marine Gérard	20	Hamois
Miss West Flanders	Michèle Roelens	22	Roeselare
Miss Liège	Amélie Dethier	23	Verviers
Contestant of Miss West Flanders	Stéphanie Carton	20	Bruges
1st Runner-up of Miss Brussels	Stéphanie Bola	25	Brussels
1st Runner-up of Miss West Flanders	Leylah Alliët	23	Roeselare
1st Runner-up of Miss Hainaut	Élise Schneidesch	25	Gerpinnes
Crown Card of Miss West Flanders	Emily Rabaut	23	Middelkerke
Miss Hainaut	Élodie Daubresse	23	Nalinnes
Miss Limburg	Maxime Daniels	19	Herk-de-Stad
Miss Walloon Brabant	Malissia Sirica	18	Tubize
2nd Runner-Up of Miss Antwerp	Xhulia Mucaj	19	Antwerp
1st Runner-up of Miss Liège	Victoria Humblet	21	Tilff
2nd Runner-up of Miss East Flanders	Anastasiya Liënko	25	Ghent
Miss Brussels	Jennifer Rosenberg	19	Jette
2nd Runner-up of Miss West Flanders	Charlotte Vanbiervliet	19	Espierres-Helchin
1st Runner-up of Miss Walloon Brabant	Lauranne Demesmaeker	25	Mont-Saint-Guibert
Miss Antwerp	Annelies Törös	19	Berchem
Miss East Flanders	Kawtar Riahi Idrissi	19	Ninove

== Judges ==
The Miss Belgium 2015 final judges were:

- Darline Devos – President of Committee Miss Belgium
- Annelien Coorevits – Miss Belgium 2007
- Virginie Claes – Miss Belgium 2006
- Daniel Dedave – Official photographer
- Barbara Gandolfi – Ex-Playboy model, comedian, businesswoman and fourth finalist of Miss Belgian Beauty 1999
- Axel Hirsoux – Singer, contestant on the second season of The Voice Belgique

The American actor, Gary Dourdan, has been officially nommed as president of jury but he withdrew at the last minute.

== Contestant notes ==
- Stéphanie Bola, first runner-up of Miss Brussels, has Congolese origins on her father's side.
- Titsia Brabants, Crown Card de Miss Antwerp, has Mexican origins on her mother's side. She is the niece of Mexican surfeur Coco Nogales.
- Aurélie Hendrickx, first runner-up of Miss Antwerp, has been singer and member of Belgian pop group, Dalton Sisters, only, composed of her sisters, Laurine, Marie-Laure et Marie-Hélène. With her group, she is participated in a final of Eurovision junior with their song Verander de wereld en 2007.
- Victoria Humblet, first runner-up of Miss Liège, has Philippian origins on her mother's side.
- Kawtar Riahi Idrissi, Miss East Flanders, has Moroccan origins on her parents' side.
- Anastasiya Liënko, second runner-up of Miss East Flanders, is of Ukrainian descent.
- Xhulia Mucaj, second runner-up of Miss Antwerp, is born in Albania.
- Emily Rabaut, Crown Card of Miss West Flanders, is the sister of Lisa Rabaut, Crown Card of Miss West Flanders 2013.
- Valentina Paesano, Crown Card de Miss Antwerp, has Italian origins on her parents' side.
- Jennifer Rosenberg, has Gambian origins on her mother's side.
- Annelies Törös, Miss Antwerp, has dual citizenships Hungarian and Belgian.
- Caroline Van Hoye, contestant of Miss Brussels, has Mauritian origins on her mother's side.

== Crossovers ==
Contestants who previously competed at other national beauty pageants:

Miss Brussels

- 2008 : Brussels: Stéphanie Bola

Miss Coast Belgium

- 2010: West Flanders: Emily Rabaut (2nd Runner-up)
- 2011: West Flanders: Leylah Alliët (2nd Runner-up)

Miss Élégance Belgique francophone 2013

- 2013: Hainaut: Valentine Cesarone (Winner)

Miss Mons

- 2012: Hainaut: Valentine Cesarone (Winner)

Miss International Belgium

- 2015: Brussels: Caroline Van Hoye (Winner)

Contestants who previously competed or will be competing at international beauty pageants:

Miss Universe

- 2015: Antwerp: Annelies Törös (Top 15)

Miss World

- 2015: West Flanders: Leylah Alliët

Miss International

- 2016: Brussels: Caroline Van Hoye

Miss Philippines Europe

- 2013: Liège: Victoria Humblet (Winner)

Mutya ng Pilipinas

- 2013: Liège: Victoria Humblet (Top 20)
  - Germany's representative

Miss Europe World

- 2015: Brussels: Caroline Van Hoye (Best Face)

Miss World Peace

- 2015: Brussels: Caroline Van Hoye

Miss Europe Continental

- 2016: Hainaut: Valentine Cesarone (Top 10)
  - Benelux's representative

Miss Tourism Queen International

- 2015: Brussels: Caroline Van Hoye

Best Model of the World

- 2012: Walloon Brabant: Malissia Sirica (Best Hope)

Miss Grand International

- 2016: East Flanders: Kawtar Riahi Idrissi

Miss Supranational

- 2015: East Flanders: Kawtar Riahi Idrissi
  - Morocco's representative
