= Leroy Labylle =

Belgian footballer (born 1991)

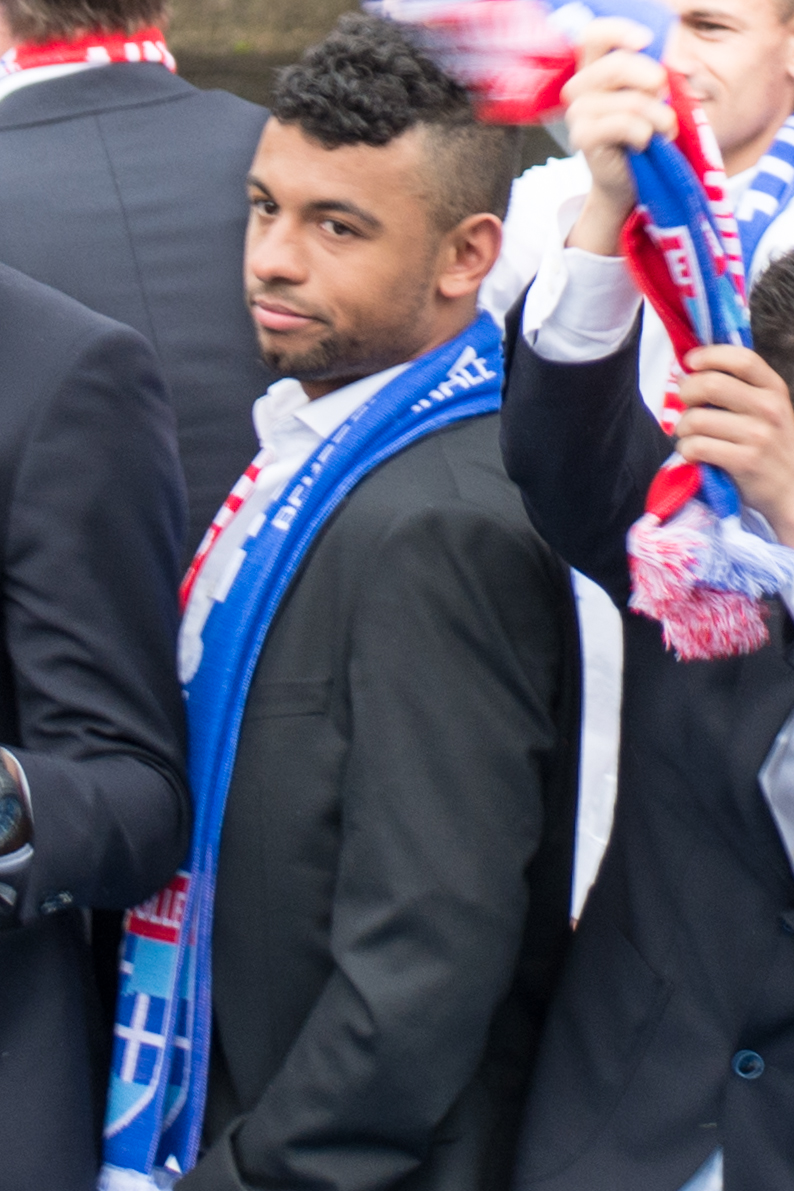
- Labylle in 2014

Personal information
- Full name: Leroy Mathurin Labylle
- Date of birth: 11 March 1991 (age 35)
- Place of birth: Liège, Belgium
- Height: 1.77 m (5 ft 10 in)
- Position: Left-back

Team information
- Current team: RCS Verlaine

Youth career
- RRFC Montegnée
- 2006–2007: CS Visé
- 2007–2010: Genk

Senior career*
Years	Team	Apps	(Gls)
2010	Genk	3	(0)
2011–2012	Standard Liège	2	(0)
2012	→ MVV (loan)	14	(1)
2012–2013	MVV	28	(3)
2013–2015	PEC Zwolle	7	(0)
2015	→ MVV (loan)	14	(1)
2015–2017	MVV	45	(0)
2017–2018	VVV-Venlo	21	(0)
2018–2019	NEC	37	(0)
2019–2021	Seraing	17	(2)
2021–2024	MVV	77	(1)
2024–2025	Union Hutoise	29	(1)
2025–	RCS Verlaine		

International career
2007	Belgium U16	3	(0)
2007	Belgium U17	1	(0)
2011	Belgium U21	2	(0)
- * Club domestic league appearances and goals as of 17:3l43, 21 February 2026 (UTC)

Leroy Mathurin Labylle (born 11 March 1991) is a Belgian professional footballer who plays as a left-back for RCS Verlaine.

Born in Liège, Labylle made his first professional appearance for Genk in 2010. A spell with Standard Liège followed, but he made his breakthrough as part of MVV. His performances earned him a transfer to Eredivisie club PEC Zwolle, where he was part of a team winning the KNVB Cup and Johan Cruyff Shield in 2014. He returned to MVV in 2015, before having stints with VVV-Venlo and NEC. Labylle returned to Belgium in 2019, signing with Seraing. He won two promotions with the club, reaching the Belgian Pro League, before rejoining MVV for his third spell with the club in 2021.

Labylle is a Belgium youth international, having represented his country at under-16, under-17 and under-21 levels.

== Career ==
=== Genk ===
Labylle made his professional debut for Genk on 18 September 2010, replacing Dugary Ndabashinze in the 78th minute of a 3–1 Belgian First Division A victory against Lokeren. He made three appearances for the club.

=== Standard Liège ===
On 27 January 2011, Labylle joined hometown club Standard Liège. He made his debut for the club on 6 February 2011, coming on as a substitute in the 94th minute for Réginal Goreux in a 1–0 league win over Eupen. One week later, in a 2–0 loss to his former club Genk, Labylle came off the bench for Henri Eninful in the 67th minute. These remained his only appearances for Standard. He featured as an unused substitute in the club's UEFA Europa League game against Helsingborgs IF on 18 August 2011.

=== MVV ===
On 31 January 2012, Labylle was sent on loan to MVV. He made his first appearance for the club on 17 February, replacing Lance Voorjans in the 61st minute of a 1–1 away draw against PEC Zwolle in the Eerste Divisie. On 27 February, he scored his first professional goal in a 6–0 beatdown of Emmen. He moved to permanently MVV in the summer of 2012.

=== PEC Zwolle ===
On 2 September 2013, Labylle signed a three-year contract with Eredivisie club PEC Zwolle, where he was set to replace Youness Mokhtar who had left for Twente. He made his debut on 14 September in a 2–1 league loss to Ajax, replacing Maikel van der Werff in the 79th minute.

Labylle was part of PEC's team which won the KNVB Cup and Johan Cruyff Shield in 2014, albeit his contributions on the pitch were limited: he made nine total appearances for the club in two years.

=== Return to MVV ===
Labylle was sent on a six-month loan to his former club MVV on 2 February 2015. Upon his return, his contract with PEC was terminated by mutual consent. One day later, on 8 July 2015, he signed a one-year contract with MVV.

Labylle suffered a tibia fracture in a derby against Fortuna Sittard on 30 November 2015, leaving him sidelined for an extended period. After a long rehabilitation period, he nevertheless rejoined MVV's squad on an amateur contract for the 2016–17 season. He soon reconquered a spot in the starting line-up and signed a new one-and-a-half-year contract with MVV on 23 January 2017.

=== VVV-Venlo ===
Despite an ongoing contract, Labylle left MVV again at the end of the season, signing a two-year contract with Eredivisie club VVV-Venlo. In Venlo he failed to secure a starting spot at left-back, as head coach Maurice Steijn mainly preferred Roel Janssen at the position.

=== NEC ===
On 2 August 2018, Labylle signed a three-year contract with NEC. On 17 August, he made his debut for the club in the first matchday of the season, starting at left-back in a 2–2 home draw against Cambuur. Labylle was a starter the entire season, making 41 total appearances.

=== Seraing ===
On 22 July 2019, Labylle's contract with NEC was terminated by mutual consent. One day later, Labylle joined Seraing competing in the third-tier Belgian First Amateur Division. This marked his first return to his native Belgium after seven years.

He was part of the team winning two promotions in a row, reaching the top level Belgian Pro League in 2021.

=== Third spell at MVV ===
Labylle returned to MVV on 9 August 2021, signing a two-year contract with the option for an additional season. He made his comeback for the club in a 1–0 away win over Jong FC Utrecht on the same day as signing, replacing Kai-David Bösing the 61st minute.

He made his 150th appearance for MVV on 27 May 2023 in a play-off game against NAC Breda. On 27 June, at the end of the season, Labylle signed a one-year contract extension keeping him in Maastricht until 2024.

== International career ==
Labylle is a Belgium youth international, having represented his country at under-16 and under-17 levels. On 24 March 2011, Labylle made his debut for Belgium under-21 in a friendly against Scotland, playing alongside the likes of Kevin De Bruyne, Thibaut Courtois and Christian Benteke in a 1–0 win.

== Personal life ==
Labylle dated Miss Belgium 2013, Noémie Happart, until 2014. She would later go on to marry fellow footballer Yannick Carrasco.

== Career statistics ==
=== Club ===
As of match played 3 May 2024

Appearances and goals by club, season and competition
Club	Season	League			National cup (Note: Includes Belgian Cup and KNVB Cup)		Other		Total	
Club	Season	Division	Apps	Goals	Apps	Goals	Apps	Goals	Apps	Goals
Genk	2010–11	Belgian Pro League	3	0	0	0	0	0	3	0
Standard Liège	2010–11	Belgian Pro League	2	0	0	0	0	0	2	0
Standard Liège	2011–12	Belgian Pro League	0	0	0	0	0	0	0	0
Standard Liège	Total		2	0	0	0	0	0	2	0
MVV (loan)	2011–12	Eerste Divisie	14	1	0	0	2 (Note: Appearances in Eerste Divisie play-offs)	0	16	1
MVV	2012–13	Eerste Divisie	24	3	0	0	2	0	26	3
MVV	2013–14	Eerste Divisie	4	0	0	0	—		4	0
MVV	Total		42	4	0	0	4	0	46	4
PEC Zwolle	2013–14	Eredivisie	7	0	2	0	—		9	0
PEC Zwolle	2014–15	Eredivisie	0	0	0	0	0	0	0	0
PEC Zwolle	Total		7	0	2	0	0	0	9	0
MVV (loan)	2014–15	Eerste Divisie	14	1	0	0	—		14	1
MVV	2015–16	Eerste Divisie	15	0	1	1	—		16	1
MVV	2016–17	Eerste Divisie	30	0	1	0	4	0	35	0
MVV	Total		59	1	2	1	4	0	65	2
VVV-Venlo	2017–18	Eredivisie	21	0	1	0	—		22	0
NEC	2018–19	Eerste Divisie	37	0	2	0	2	0	41	0
Seraing	2019–20	Eerste Nationale	17	2	2	0	—		16	1
Seraing	2020–21	1B Pro League	0	0	0	0	0	0	0	0
Seraing	Total		17	2	2	0	0	0	19	2
MVV	2021–22	Eerste Divisie	18	0	1	0	—		19	0
MVV	2022–23	Eerste Divisie	28	0	1	0	2	0	31	0
MVV	2023–24	Eerste Divisie	31	1	1	0	—		32	1
MVV	Total		77	1	3	0	2	0	82	1
Career total			265	8	12	1	12	0	289	9

== Honours ==
Genk

- Belgian Pro League: 2010–11

PEC Zwolle

- KNVB Cup: 2013–14
- Johan Cruyff Shield: 2014
