= Miss Belgium 2013 =

- Date: January 6, 2013
- Presenters: Jean-Luc Bertrand; Véronique De Kock
- Venue: Knokke Casino, Knokke, Belgium
- Broadcaster: AB3
- Entrants: 24
- Placements: 12
- Winner: Noémie Happart; Liège
- Congeniality: Virginie Urbain; Luxembourg

Miss Belgium 2013 the 45th Miss Belgium pageant, held on January 7, 2013 at the Casino Knokke in Knokke, Belgium. The winner Noémie Happart went to Miss World 2013 and placed in top 15. Noémie also won Miss Sport Belgium that evening.

== Winner and runners-up ==
Final Results	Contestant
Miss Belgium 2013	Liège- Noémie Happart
1st Runner-Up	Namur - Shérine Dandoy
2nd Runner-Up	Flemish Brabant - Melissa Vingerhoed
Top 5	East Flanders - Kelly Gheerardyns; Limburg- Leen Geysen

== Special awards ==
Special awards
Award	Contestant
Beach Babe	Liège - Valérie Smal
Miss Social Media	West Flanders - Astrid Vandenberghe
Miss Charity	Antwerp - Rani Dehenain
Miss Sport	Liège - Noémie Happart
Miss Sympathie (Miss Congeniality)	Luxembourg - Virginie Urbain
Miss Talent	East Flanders - Kelly Gheerardyns
