= Miss Belgium 2014 =

- Date: January 11, 2014
- Presenters: Patrick Ridremont; Véronique De Kock
- Venue: Plopsaland Theater, De Panne, Belgium
- Broadcaster: AB3
- Entrants: 24
- Placements: 12
- Winner: Laurence Langen; Limburg
- Congeniality: Laura Antonacci; Limburg

Miss Belgium 2014 the 46th Miss Belgium pageant, held on January 11, 2014 at the Plopsaland Theater in De Panne, Belgium.

The winner, Laurence Langen from Limburg, was crowned by the outgoing title holder, Noémie Happart (Miss Belgium 2013). Langen would represent Belgium in the competitions of Miss Universe 2014 and Miss World 2014, but gave up due to health problems, which prevented her participation. The first runner-up of the contest, Anissa Blondin took her place.

== Winner and runners-up ==
Final Results	Contestant
Miss Belgium 2014	Limburg- Laurence Langen
1st Runner-Up	Flemish Brabant - Anissa Blondin
2nd Runner-Up	Luxembourg - Laura Charlier
Top 6	Antwerp - Sarah Van Elst; Limburg- Laura Antonacci; Limburg- Lotte Feyen
Top 12	Antwerp - Élisabeth Marckx; Antwerp - Emilie Hendrickx; Liège - Catherine Haduca; Namur - Maureen Caltagirone; Walloon Brabant- Alexandra Watrice; West Flanders - Cindy Sabbe

== Special awards ==
Award	Contestant
Beach Babe	Liège - Catherine Haduca
Miss Social Media	West Flanders - Cindy Sabbe
Miss Charity	Antwerp - Emilie Hendrickx
Miss Sport	Brussels - Maïté Royer
Miss Congeniality	Limburg- Laura Antonacci
Miss Talent	Namur - Maureen Caltagirone
Miss Photogenic	Limburg- Lotte Feyen

== Official Contestants ==
24 candidates competed for the title:

Province	Contestant	Age	Hometown
Antwerp	Élisabeth Marckx	18	Aartselaar
Antwerp	Emilie Hendrickx	19	Antwerp
Antwerp	Sarah Van Elst	22	Mechelen
Brussels	Maïté Royer	21	Uccle
East Flanders	Axandre Van den Hende	19	Heusden
East Flanders	Hajer Godefroot	22	Ghent
Flemish Brabant	Anissa Blondin	21	Dworp
Flemish Brabant	Coralie Porrovecchio	18	Dilbeek
Flemish Brabant	Farah Amri	18	Tienen
Flemish Brabant	Morgane Lemmens	19	Strombeek-Bever
Hainaut	Ana Caliskan	21	Ham-sur-Heure-Nalinnes
Hainaut	Camille Roger	20	Quévy
Liège	Catherine Haduca	22	Liège
Limburg	Laura Antonacci	22	Beverlo
Limburg	Laurence Langen	19	Genk
Limburg	Lotte Feyen	20	Peer
Limburg	Valeria Broggio	18	Houthalen-Helchteren
Luxembourg	Laura Charlier	22	Paliseul
Namur	Maureen Caltagirone	19	Stave
Namur	Pamela Jeanmart	23	Sambreville
Walloon Brabant	Alexandra Watrice	19	La Hulpe
West Flanders	Cindy Sabbe	20	Jabbeke
West Flanders	Evy Samain	22	Izegem
