= Sven Vermant =

Belgian football manager and former player

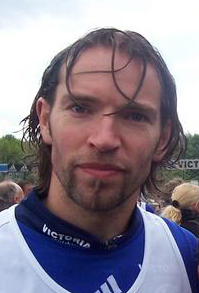
- Vermant in 2005

Personal information
- Date of birth: 4 April 1973 (age 53)
- Place of birth: Lier, Belgium
- Height: 1.83 m (6 ft 0 in)
- Position: Defensive midfielder

Team information
- Current team: Belgium U17 (manager)

Youth career
- 1978–1989: KV Hooikt

Senior career*
Years	Team	Apps	(Gls)
1989–1993	KV Mechelen	21	(4)
1993–2001	Club Brugge	243	(67)
2001–2005	Schalke 04	98	(6)
2003	Schalke 04 II	1	(1)
2005–2008	Club Brugge	69	(5)
2008–2010	Royal Knokke		

International career
1995–2004	Belgium	18	(0)

Managerial career
- 2009–2010: Club Brugge U19 (assistant)
- 2010–2011: Club Brugge B
- 2011–2012: Club Brugge (sporting director & scout)
- 2013–2014: Club Brugge U10
- 2014–2015: Club Brugge U17
- 2015–2018: Club Brugge B
- 2018: Waasland-Beveren
- 2022–2025: Belgium U16 (assistant)
- 2022–2025: Belgium U17 (assistant)
- 2025–: Belgium U17
- * Club domestic league appearances and goals

Sven Vermant (born 4 April 1973) is a Belgian professional football manager and former player who played as a midfielder. He is best known for his spells at Club Brugge and FC Schalke 04. He is currently in charge of the Belgium national under-17 team.

== Club career ==
Born in Lier, Vermant started his career in 1978 at KV Hooikt and played there until 1989 when he moved to KV Mechelen, that had won the UEFA Cup Winners' Cup the year before. In 1993 Vermant moved to Club Brugge, where he won both the championship (1996, 1998) and the Belgian Cup (1995, 1996) twice.

Vermant stayed at Bruges until he transferred to FC Schalke 04 in 2001, after being heavily linked with a move to Scottish club Rangers. At Schalke he won the 2001–02 DFB-Pokal.

In 2005, Vermant returned to Club Brugge where he played until 2008. On 9 December 2007, he played his 400th game for Club Brugge against KSV Roeselare, which they won 2–1. Vermant is the ninth player in the history of the club to achieve this milestone.

In July 2008 his transferred to Royal Knokke from the Provincial League.

== International career ==
Vermant collected 18 caps with the Belgium national team and was in the team for the 2002 World Cup. He made his debut on 23 August 1995 in a 2–1 loss against Germany.

== Coaching career ==
Vermant was set to become assistant manager of Club Brugge's youth system, signing a contract due to take effect in May 2011.

== Personal life ==
Sven Vermant is married to Stefanie Van Vyve (Miss Belgian Beauty 1995). They have a daughter, Elena (° 1999) and a son, Romeo (° 2004). His son Romeo plays football at Club Brugge.

== Career statistics ==
Appearances and goals by club, season and competition
Club	Season	League			National cup (Note: Includes DFB-Pokal)		League cup (Note: Includes DFL-Ligapokal)		Continental		Other		Total	
Club	Season	Division	Apps	Goals	Apps	Goals	Apps	Goals	Apps	Goals	Apps	Goals	Apps	Goals
KV Mechelen	1991–92	Eerste klasse	1	0										
KV Mechelen	1992–93	Eerste klasse	20	4										
KV Mechelen	Total		21	4										
Club Brugge	1993–94	Eerste klasse	29	5										
Club Brugge	1994–95	Eerste klasse	31	12										
Club Brugge	1995–96	Eerste klasse	31	6										
Club Brugge	1996–97	Eerste klasse	26	4										
Club Brugge	1997–98	Eerste klasse	30	6										
Club Brugge	1998–99	Eerste klasse	31	7										
Club Brugge	1999-00	Eerste klasse	32	14										
Club Brugge	2000–01	Eerste klasse	33	13										
Club Brugge	Total		243	67										
Schalke 04	2001–02	Bundesliga	28	0	4	0	2	0	4 (Note: Appearances in UEFA Champions League)	1	—		38	1
Schalke 04	2002–03	Bundesliga	23	4	3	0	2	0	3 (Note: Appearances in UEFA Cup)	0	—		31	4
Schalke 04	2003–04	Bundesliga	25	2	1	0	0	0	6 (Note: Three appearances in UEFA Cup, three appearances in UEFA Intertoto Cup)	0	—		31	2
Schalke 04	2004–05	Bundesliga	22	0	4	0	0	0	11 (Note: Five appearances in UEFA Cup, six appearances in UEFA Intertoto Cup)	0	—		37	0
Schalke 04	Total		98	6	12	0	4	0	24	1	0	0	138	7
Schalke 04 II	2001–02	Regionalliga Nord	1	1	0	0	—		—		—		1	1
Club Brugge	2005–06	Belgian First Division A	32	1										
Club Brugge	2006–07	Belgian First Division A	27	3										
Club Brugge	2007–08	Belgian First Division A	10	1										
Club Brugge	Total		69	5										
Career total			432	83										

== Honours ==
Club Brugge

- Belgian First Division: 1995–96, 1997–98
- Belgian Cup: 1994–95, 1995–96; runner-up 1997–98
- Belgian Supercup: 1994, 1996, 1998, 2005
- Bruges Matins: 1993, 1995, 1996, 1998, 2000
- Jules Pappaert Cup: 1995

Schalke 04

- DFB-Pokal: 2001–02
- UEFA Intertoto Cup: 2003, 2004

Belgium

- FIFA Fair Play Trophy: 2002 World Cup
