= Tatiana Silva =

Belgian model (born 1985)

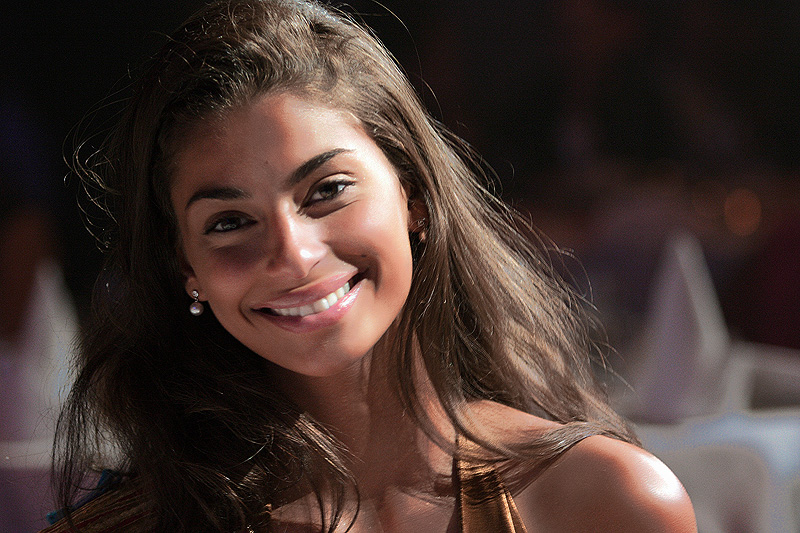
- Tatiana Silva in 2005
- Born: Tatiana Silva Braga Tavares; 5 February 1985 (age 41); Brussels, Belgium
- Beauty pageant titleholder
- Title: Miss Belgium 2005
- Major competitions: Miss Belgium 2005 (Winner); Miss World 2005 (Unplaced); Miss Universe 2006 (Unplaced)

Tatiana Silva Braga Tavares (born 5 February 1985) is a Belgian TV host, model and beauty pageant titleholder who was crowned Miss Belgium 2005. She entered the pageant as Miss Brussels and represented Belgium at the Miss World 2005 and later at Miss Universe 2006.

== Early life in Belgium ==
Tatiana Silva was born in the Brussels suburb of Uccle (Ukkel) to Cape Verdean parents. She was studying to become a PA or personal assistant and working as a shop assistant at the time of the contest. Fluent in French, Dutch, English, Portuguese and Cape Verdean Creole, she enjoys reading, dancing and traveling. She succeeded Miss Belgium 2004 Ellen Petri.

== Miss Belgium ==
In 2005, Tatiana Silva won Miss Belgium. She succeeded 2004 winner Ellen Petri. Her win made headlines around the world as being the first Black Miss Belgium. She continued on to represent her country Belgium in the Miss World contest that year. A second Miss Belgium of African descent, Laura Beyne, later won in 2012.

== Ambassador for UNICEF ==
In 2014, Tatiana Silva join forces with UNICEF in combating poverty and hunger in the region of Africa. Her efforts in promoting the importance of education, nutrition and medicine can be seen through the UNICEF campaigns reflecting her visits to regions in West Africa and the factories dedicated to supporting those in need. Earlier in her joining the UNICEF team, she visited the country of Côte d'Ivoire, bringing attention to the country's difficulties. She continues to be an advocate for organizations like UNICEF and Handicap International. She has traveled to Angola as an Ambassador for Handicap International to rally support for Angolans with disabilities. Her objective is to help in any way possible and educate others on issues other countries endure. She is also an outspoken person in the fight against cancer.

== Television and radio ==
In 2006, Tatiana Silva worked for the channel AB3 commenting on the reality TV show Miss Swan. In 2010, Tatiana Silva participated in the reality show Expeditie Robinson 2010 (en), a survival game in the tropics. In Belgium, this game is broadcast on Dutch channel 2BE. Her career continued in a number of joint efforts with M6, TV5 and the RTBF as a weather presenter and personality (host) on shows, such as, C'est du belge, Drôle d'été, Cap 48 and Printemps, grandeur nature. In April 2015, she co-hosted during one week Les 2 font la paire and Weekly radio on the 8/9 (2014) on VivaCité radio channel. Her career in television and radio spans more than nine years.

In 2017, she participated in the eighth season of Danse avec les stars, the French version of Dancing with the Stars. She was partnered with professional dancer Christophe Licata. They finished third.

== Music ==
In 2008, she released a single covering Nu Shooz's 1986 hit "I Can't Wait". She has been presenting the weather on Belgian channel RTBF since December 2009 and on French channel M6 since April 2013. She now presents the weather on French Channel TF1.

== Personal life ==
Tatiana Silva is also related to another famous Cape Verdean singer, Mayra Andrade. The two are first cousins.

In June 2011, Belgian singer-songwriter Stromae confirmed he was dating Silva. Of her relationship with him, she said: "it is for life". They broke up in September 2012.

Preceded by Ellen Petri	Miss Belgium; 2005	Succeeded by Virginie Claes
