= Leylah Alliët =

Belgian beauty pageant titleholder (born 1991)

- Born: September 15, 1991 (age 35); Roeselare, Belgium
- Occupation: Marketing Manager
- Beauty pageant titleholder
- Title: Miss World Belgium 2015
- Hair colour: Brown
- Eye colour: Blue
- Major competitions: Miss World Belgium 2015 (Winner); Miss World 2015 (Unplaced)

Leylah Alliët (born 15 September 1991 in Belgium) is a Belgian beauty pageant titleholder who was crowned as 1st runner up in Miss Belgium 2015 and also crowned Miss World Belgium 2015 and represented her country at the Miss World 2015.

== Early life ==
Alliët was born and raised in the city of Roeselare in the Flemish province of West Flanders. She holds a degree in marketing and real estate and works as marketing manager for Mercedes-Benz.

== Pageantry ==
=== Miss Belgium 2015 ===
Alliët was crowned as Miss World Belgium 2015 in the city of De Panne on January 10, 2015. She was also the 1st runner up in Miss Belgium 2015.

=== Miss World 2015 ===
Alliët represented her country at Miss World 2015 but did not place.

Awards and achievements
Preceded by Anissa Blondin	Miss World Belgium; 2015	Succeeded by Lenty Frans
