= Stephanie Meire =

Stephanie Meire (born 11 May 1971 in Bruges) is a Belgian actress and beauty pageant titleholder who was crowned Miss Belgium 1993 and her country's representative at Miss World 1993. She has subsequently done acting work and hosted TV game shows including Puzzeltijd (Puzzle Time) on vtm.

Preceded by Sandra Joine	Miss Belgium; 1993	Succeeded by Ilse De Meulemeester
