= Goedele Liekens =

Belgian model and psychologist (born 1963)

Goedele Maria Gertrude Liekens
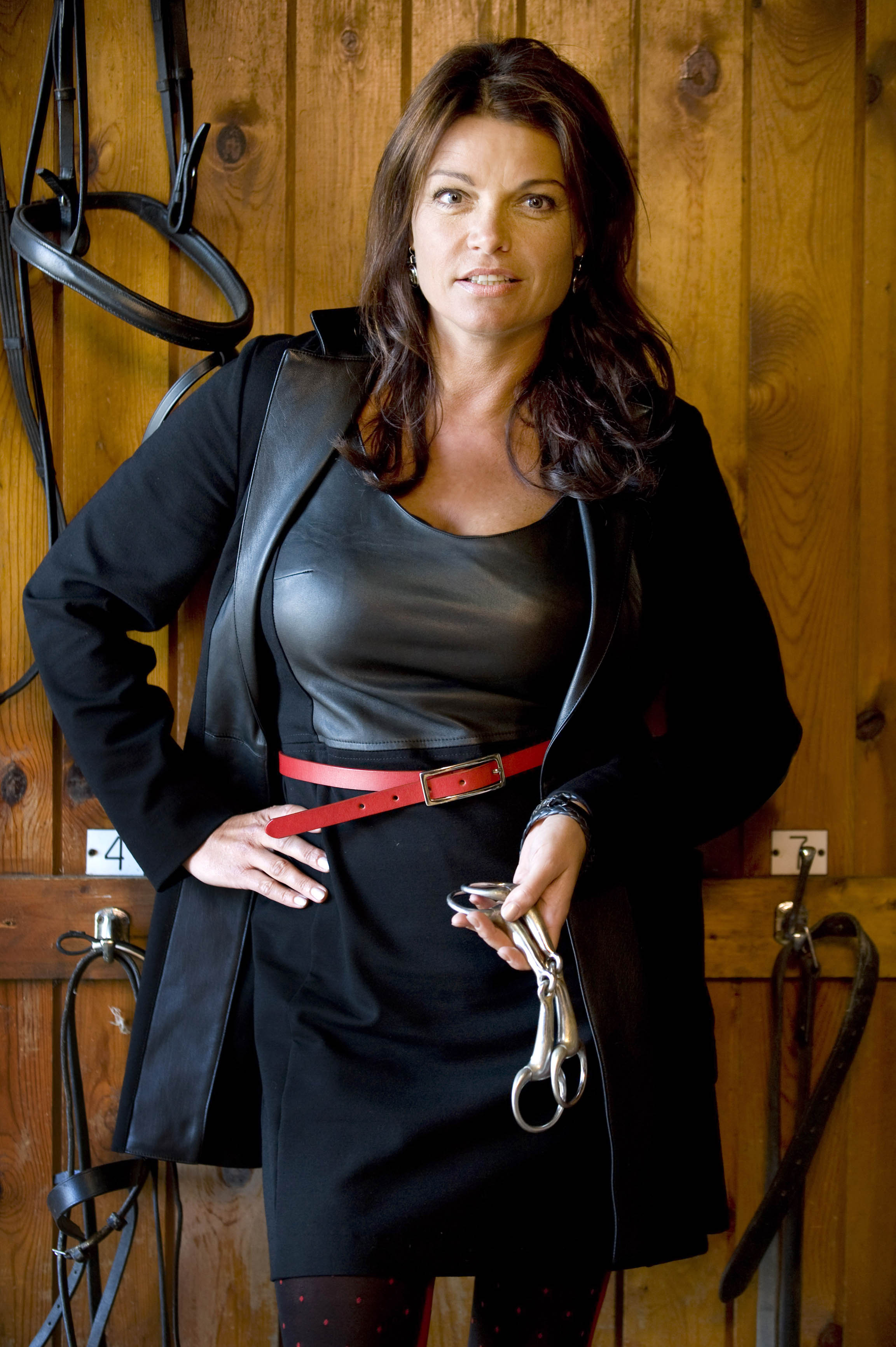
- Liekens in 2011

Member of the Chamber of Representatives
- Incumbent
- Assumed office 20 June 2019

Personal details
- Born: 21 January 1963 (age 63) Aarschot, Belgium
- Party: Anders
- Spouse: Chris Cockmartin (m. 1996; div. 2006)
- Children: 2
- Education: Free University of Brussels; Katholieke Universiteit Leuven
- Website: www.goedele.be

Goedele Maria Gertrude Liekens (Dutch: [ˈɣudələ ˈlikə(n)s]; born 21 January 1963 in Aarschot) is a Belgian politician, sexologist, tv host and beauty pageant titleholder who was crowned Miss Belgium 1986 and represented her country at Miss Universe 1986. She also currently serving as a member of the Belgian Chamber of Representatives for Anders (formerly Open Flemish Liberals and Democrats), to which she was elected in 2019.

== Early life and education ==
Liekens grew up in Begijnendijk, a rural village in Flanders. She studied psychology at the Free University of Brussels and did her internship in a prison, where she worked with inmates being condemned to lifelong sentences. She gained national fame when she was elected Miss Belgium in 1986, in particular, due to her rebellious behavior during the following Miss Universe election taking place in Panama, where she refused to shake hands with the head of state, General Manuel Noriega, saying that he ‘led an incorrect and faulty regime’. Subsequently, Liekens studied for and obtained a master's degree in clinical and adult psychology from the University of Brussels.

== Career ==
=== Initial television career ===
The very next day after one of her first television appearances (RUR) as Miss Belgium, Goedele was asked by the Dutch National TV (VARA) to lead her own talkshow. This was the start of a long list of talkshows in Belgium and The Netherlands, named ‘Goedele’, Goedele Live, Goedele de dingen die gebeuren, Goedele op dinsdag, Goedele On Top...for decades long. When in 1989, the first Flemish commercial broadcasting channel (VTM) went on air, Liekens was offered an exclusive contract. She was their leading lady for more than 15 years with top rating talkshows on social and emotional topics and the very successful debate program ‘Recht Van Antwoord’ (the right to answer). She started her own production company, Jok Foe producing her celebrated programs, which she sold at Sanoma NV in 2007. After that she mainly hosted shows for Dutch TV and the United Kingdom. Sexologist Whilst working for TV and radio, Liekens specialized as Psychologist by studying Family and Sexologist Sciences at the Medical Faculty Catholic University of Leuven, where she graduated in 2003. From 1992 until 1996, she closely worked at Rutgers, an international centre of expertise on Sexual and Reproductive Health and Rights (SRHR) at The Hague, as a policy advisor and sexologist. Later, she worked privately as a therapist and counselor. She continued her international career in the media, combining her academic expertise with television and radio. From 1991 to 1997, she presented the taboo-challenging call-in radio show De Lieve Lust (The Sweet Desire) on National Public Radio (Studio Brussel). She also hosted the popular call-in television show Vanavond niet, schat (Not Tonight, Honey) on VTM in Belgium from 1994 to 1997, as well as a similar program in the Netherlands, Let's Talk About Sex, on SBS6 from 1995 to 1997. In 1997, she produced Sex, Love and Desire, a self-help video series addressing common sexual dysfunctions.

=== UNFPA ===
In 1999 Kofi Annan appointed Liekens an (honorary) Goodwill Ambassador for the United Nations Population Fund (UNFPA). She has traveled the world since then to advocate Sexual and Reproductive Health Rights (SRHR) with issues such as safe motherhood, women's empowerment, birth control, the challenge of vaginal fistulas, early marriage and the amelioration of sexual education in developing countries. In 2001, she visited Botswana to observe and to witness the consequences of HIV. She reported these observations at a UN conference and the European Parliament. A year later, she travelled to Afghanistan to contribute the reproductive health of Afghan women. She made a series of documentaries on those topics Strong Women, 14 episodes broadcast on national commercial TV (VTM).

=== Later television work ===
While Liekens continued to enhance her knowledge as a sexologist, the presence of the topic of sex within her television work decreased. She of course still appeared as professional sexologist in a variety of television shows, but the ones she presented were given a different undertone. She for instance presented a couple of more generic talk show and hosted the debate program called Recht van Antwoord (Right to answer) covering numerous societal items. In 2001, Liekens performed as a presentator at De Zwakste Schakel, a Flemish version of the British The Weakest Link. After a dozen of episodes, the quiz was taken off screen. Afterwards, Liekens declared not to have been happy within the role of being a strict, severe quiz master, as the format had asked her to be. In 2007 Liekens sold her production company JokFoe to Sanoma and therefor worked for the Belgian SBS media group. At first, she only made programs for VT4, but later onwards, she would also work for VIJFtv. Her first project was the program named Smarter Than A Ten Year Old?, which was a quiz in which adults had to answer questions originally made for ten year olds. She was also seen as the captain of the female team in The Strong Gender. In 2013, Liekens signed an exclusive contract at the biggest Dutch commercial channel (RTL 4), where she was a weekly expert at their successful talk show RTL Late Night. She was one of the hosts of their program named Divorce Hotel, about relationship counselling for couples on the verge of divorce, appeared as an expert at The Worst Husband Ever. She was co-hosting the couples love-education program Sex Academy with Nicolette Kluijver. In 2016 and 2017 she hosted a couples retreat program (Goedele On Top, RTL 5) mainly filmed at Bonaire. In the spring of 2018, Liekens presented a talkshow evolving around Temptation Island, broadcast by VIJFtv.

=== Channel 4 ===
In August 2015, Liekens was asked by the British Channel 4 to create and present Sex in Class, a programme filming her while she was giving her typical comprehensive and open sex education, not only focusing on the dangers of sex but also discussing sexual pleasure. The program showed British students to be severely lacking trustworthy information with regard to responsible and fun sexuality, a deficit which they intended to fill through porn. Within the framework of her commitments as a UNPFA Ambassador, Liekens earlier on already advocated for an amelioration of sexual knowledge and education as a crucial part of reproductive health. After the episode of Sex in Class, she pleaded to broaden the curriculum of the British secondary education and its final qualifications by implementing a thorough and broad sexual educational package. Although controversial at first the show was an enormous success and newspapers as The Times and The Guardian screamed for 'more of this' and to 'clone teacher Goedele'.

== Political career ==
In March 2019, Liekens announced her candidacy in the federal elections of 2019, holding the third place on the list of liberal party Open VLD. She was subsequently elected as a Member of the Chamber of Representatives, receiving nearly 16,000 preferential votes.

== Printed Media ==
Starting from 1993, Liekens published eight bestselling books, mostly covering the topic of sexuality, including ‘The Vagina Book’ in 2005 and ‘The Penis Book’ one year later. Followed by ‘The Orgasm book’, ‘Our sexbook, SOS Sex, and lately The Sex Bibble. On the occasion of her work for the UN, ‘Strong Women’ was issued in 2010. She also wrote columns for different kinds of magazines (Playboy, Joepie, Goed Gevoel, Wendy, Margriet, and newspapers (Het Laatste Nieuws, Nina)).

== Goedele MAGAZINE and GDL ==
In 2008 Sanoma Magazines started GOEDELE MAGAZINE’, a monthly Glossy magazine about psychology, society, relationships and international topics. Together with Danny Illegems, Liekens led the editorial office. The fourth edition sold over more than 70,000 copies. Due to a switch towards television, Sanoma was forced to cut expenses and stopped the magazine. After a withdrawal from the publishing company Sanoma, Liekens continued to make another eight editions in 2012 and 2013 of a second succeeding magazine, named GDL.

== Television shows ==
Goedele Liekens had a leading role in the following televisions shows:

Season	Network	Show	Variety	Function
1988-1989	VARA (NL)	Goedele	Talkshow	Presentation
1989-1993	VTM (BE)	Wie ben ik?	Comical quiz	Co-presentation
1989-1993	VTM (BE)	Meer moet dat niet zijn	Talkshow	Co-presentation
1989-1993	KRO (NL)	Liefde Lusten & Lasten	Talkshow	Presentation
1994-1995	KRO (NL)	Love life	Talkshow	Expert
1995-1997	SBS6 (NL)	Over Seks Gesproken	Talkshow	Presentation
1994-1997	K2/VTM (B)	Vanavond Niet, Schat	Talkshow	Presentation
1996-1997	RTL (NL)	Goedele Night	Talkshow	Presentation
1992-2000	VTM (B)	Goedele Live, Goedele De Dingen die Gebeuren	Talkshow	Editor in Chief + presentation
2000-2006	VTM (B)	Recht van antwoord	Debate show	Editor in Chief + presentation
2000-2006	VTM (B)	Sterke Vrouwen	Documentary	Editor in Chief + presentation
2010-2011	VTM (B)	Goedele Nu	Varied, human interest	Editor in Chief + presentation
2013-2014	RTL 4 (NL)	De dokters	Medical show	Presentation
2014-2015	RTL 4 (NL)	Divorce Hotel	Relationship mediation	Presentation
2014-2015	RTL 5 (NL)	Sex Academy	Sex & relationships	Co-presentation
2015-2016	Channel 4 (UK)	Sex in Class	Sex education	Editor in Chief + presentation
2016-2017	Channel 4 (UK)	Sex Box	Sex education	Editor in Chief + presentation
2016-2017	RTL 5 (NL)	Goedele On top Couples retreat	Relationship mediation	Editor in Chief + presentation
2018-2020	VT5 (BE)	Goedele On top	Talkshow	Presentation
2019-2020	VT5 (BE)	Celebs Go Dating	Relationships	Presentation

== Bibliography ==
- 1993 - 69 vragen over seks, waar je nooit het juiste antwoord op kreeg
- 2005 - Het vaginaboek
- 2006 - Het penisboek
- 2008 - Ons Seksboek
- 2009 - SOS Seks
- 2010 - Sterke Vrouwen
- 2011 - Haar Orgasmeboek
- 2012 - Start 2 sex
- 2015 - Superseks in 10 stappen
- 2016 - Help, mijn kind denkt aan seks!
- 2017 - Herwerkte versie van Het Vagina Boek
- 2019 - Het seksboek
- 2020 - WorldWideWet

== Personal life ==
In 1996, Liekens married Chris Cockmartin, with whom she has two daughters. The couple divorced in 2006, but continued to run their production company Jok Foe together until 2009.

== In popular culture ==
Goedele Liekens was portrayed as the character "Goedele Liefkens" in the Van Rossem-comic book (1991) by Erik Meynen. She also appeared in the comic book series 'De Geverniste Vernepelingskes by Urbanus and Jan Bosschaert.

In 2013 the word 'sukkelseks' (roughly translated as ‘clumsy sex’), coined by Liekens, was officially registered in the Van Dale Dictionary.
