= Alizée Poulicek =

Belgian-Czeck model (born 1987)

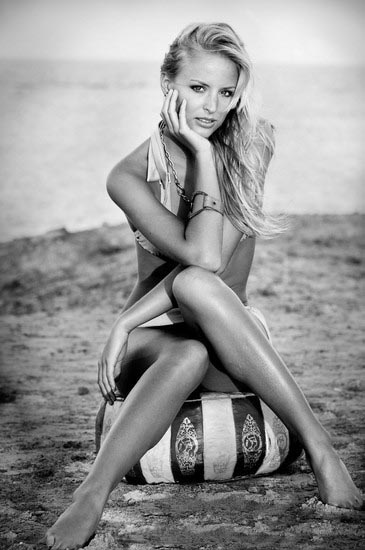
- Born: Alizée Poulicek; 26 June 1987 (age 39); Uccle, Belgium
- Height: 1.75 m (5 ft 9 in)
- Beauty pageant titleholder
- Title: Miss Belgium 2008
- Hair color: Blonde
- Eye color: Brown
- Major competitions: Miss Belgium 2008 (winner); Miss Universe 2008; Miss World 2008

Alizée Poulicek (born 26 June 1987) is a Belgian TV host, model and beauty pageant titleholder who was crowned Miss Belgium 2008.

== Biography ==
Poulicek won the title of Miss Belgium 2008 and represented her country in Miss Universe 2008 in Nha Trang, Vietnam. She also represented Belgium in Miss World 2008 in Johannesburg, South Africa.

She can speak French, English, and Czech. At the time of her reign as Miss Belgium she could not speak Dutch (although she did receive Dutch lessons in school, according to Poulicek "of ridiculous low quality"); which led to controversy in Flanders.

Following her reign, Poulicek followed a career in modelling and television presenting, including for the RSCA sports station.

Preceded by Annelien Coorevits	Miss Belgium; 2008	Succeeded by Zeynep Sever
