= Julie Taton =

Belgian politician and model

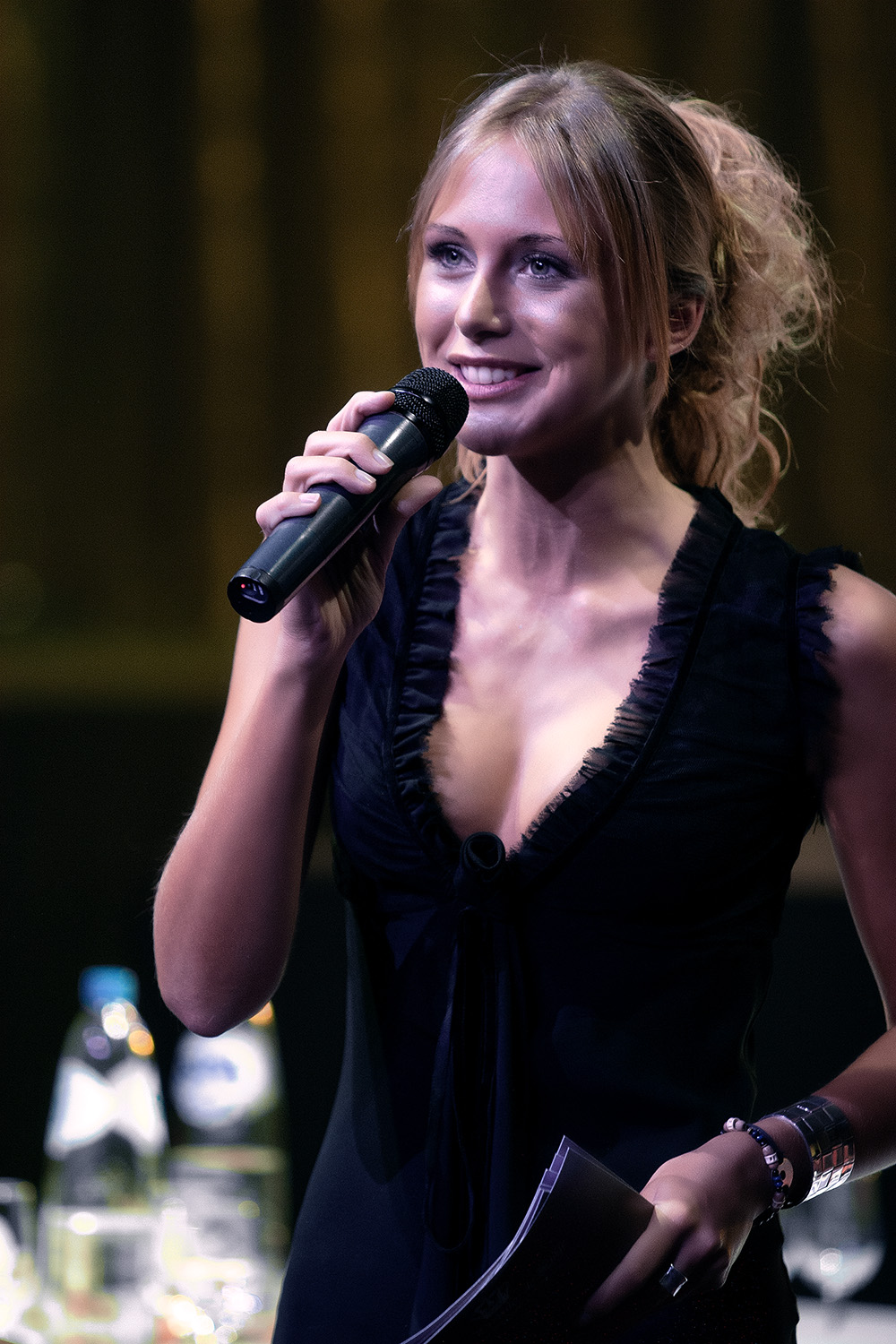
- Born: 6 February 1984 (age 42); Namur, Belgium
- Occupation: Television host
- Beauty pageant titleholder
- Title: Miss Belgium 2003
- Major competitions: Miss Belgium 2003 (Winner); Miss World 2003 (Unplaced)

Julie Taton (born 6 February 1984) is a Belgian politician from the Reformist Movement. By profession she is a TV host and beauty pageant titleholder who was crowned Miss Belgium 2003 and represented her country at Miss World 2003.

== Biography ==
Taton was born in Namur, Belgium in 1984. In 2003, when she was 18 years old, she won the title of Miss Belgium. She represented her country at Miss Universe 2003, Miss Europe 2003, and Miss World 2003.

After her reign as Miss Belgium came to an end, she joined RTL-TVI in Belgium as an announcer. She also presented a live morning show on Radio Contact, also in Belgium.

In 2009, Taton presented the Belgian version of L'Amour est dans le pré. In 2011, she presented the talent show series Belgium's Got Talent and the French reality show Secret Story. In 2009 and 2016, Taton was a participant in the French game show Fort Boyard.

Taton is an ambassador for the Red Cross in Belgium and supporter of Think Pink, an association for breast cancer survivors.

In the 2024 Belgian federal election she was elected in Hainaut.

She tried to change her official address to an apartment in Mons owned by the president of the Reformist Movement, Georges-Louis Bouchez, so that she could get elected there in the October 2024 local government elections. This was rejected by the Belgian Ministry of the Interior.

| Preceded by Ann Van Elsen | Miss Belgium; 2003 | Succeeded by Ellen Petri |
