= Jef Maes =

Belgian composer and violist

Jef "Joseph" Maes (5 April 1905 in Antwerp – 30 June 1996 in Antwerp) was a Belgian composer and violist.

Encouraged by his friend, André Cluytens, he completed his study at the Flemish conservatory in Antwerp. He studied viola with Napoleon Distelmans; chamber music with Albert van de Vijver; and counterpoint and fugue with Karel Candael.

When he was 23 years old, he composed his first work, which was a romantic Meditation for violin and piano.

After his studies, he was employed for two years as a violist in the opera orchestra in Antwerp; in 1926 he participated in an orchestra under the conductorship of Lodewijk de Vocht, Nieuwe Concerten. In 1930 he was a soloist with the well-known Dierentuin concerts in Antwerp, directed by Flor Alpaerts. Afterwards he was a violist for about 10 years with the Casino Orchestra at Knokke Casino. In 1933 he lectured at the music academy in Boom, Antwerp; ten years later he was appointed director of the academy. From 1942 to 1955 he lectured in harmony teachings at the Royal Flemish Conservatory in Antwerp. He also lectured in chamber music from 1955 to 1970.

Along with Gaston Ariën, J.A. Zwijsen and Steven Candael, Maes founded the Antwerpse Philharmonie (Antwerp Philharmonic Orchestra) in 1955, their first concert given on December 10, 1956. The orchestra is now the Antwerp Symphony Orchestra (formerly Royal Flemish Philharmonic / deFilharmonie).

Beginning in 1961 he led the annual International Music Camp, organized through "youth and music" in Belgium during the summer holidays. He was also a musical mentor in Turnhout.

== Selected works ==
Opera

- Marise (1946)
- De antikwaar, Television Opera (1959); libretto by Anton van Wilderode

Ballet

- Tu auras nom... Tristan (1964); after Joseph Bédier

Orchestra

- Drie rythmen in dansvorm (Three Rhythms in Dance Form) (1931)
- Concertstück (Concert Piece) (1938)
- Overtura buffa (1939)
- Symfonie in G (Symphony No. 1) (1953)
- Ouverture concertante (1961)
- Symphony No. 2 in A major (1965)
- Partita for string orchestra (1966)
- Praeludium, Pantomime, Scherzo (1966)
- De verloofden for chamber orchestra (1969)
- Mei 1871 for speaker and orchestra (1971)
- Symphony No. 3 (1975)
- Intrada (1980)

Wind orchestra

- Vijf volksdansen (Five Folk Dances) (1956)
- Bel canto Ouverture (1967)
- Suite (1977)
- Feestouverture (Festival Overture)

Concertante

- Meditatie (Meditation) for violin and orchestra (1929)
- Légende for violin and orchestra (1933)
- Arabeske en scherzo (Arabesque and Scherzo) for flute and orchestra (1935)
- Concerto for viola and orchestra (1937)
- Concerto for viola and orchestra (1943)
- Concertstuk (Concert Piece) for trombone and orchestra (1944)
- Concerto [No. 1] for piano and orchestra (1948)
- Concerto for violin and orchestra (1951)
- Concerto for harpsichord and string orchestra (1955)
- Burlesque for bassoon and orchestra (1957)
- Dialoog (Dialogue) for violin and orchestra (1973)
- Concerto No. 2 for piano and orchestra (1975)

Chamber music

- Meditatie (Meditation) for violin and piano (1927)
- Andante rustique for viola and piano (1934)
- Sonata in D for violin and piano (1934)
- Sonatine for flute and viola (1934)
- Arabeske en scherzo (Arabesque and Scherzo) for flute and piano (1935); also orchestrated
- Intermezzo for viola and piano (1935)
- Concertstuk for trombone (or tuba, or oboe, or bassoon) and piano (1944)
- Burlesque for bassoon and piano (1957); also orchestrated
- Concertstuk for trumpet and piano (1957)
- Nocturne for guitar (1959)
- Prélude et allegro for brass quintet (1959)
- Duo for violin and piano (1962)
- Etude No. 17 for timpani and piano (1962)
- Trio for violin, viola and percussion (1964)
- Vier kontrasten (4 Contrasts) for 4 clarinets (1965)
- Divertimento for viola or violin and piano (1966)
- Impromptu for cello and piano (1966)
- Studie (Etude) for double bass and piano (1966)
- Quintet for flute, oboe, clarinet, bassoon and piano (1968)
- Suite for percussion and piano (1968)
- String Quartet (1970)
- Studie (Etude) for violin solo (1978)
- Saxo-scope for 4 saxophones (1979)
- Kamermuziek (Chamber Music) for flute, violin, guitar and cello (1981)
- Trio for 2 flutes and cello (1985)
- Sérénade fantasque for violin and piano

Keyboard

- Etude No. 2 in E♭ for piano (1960)
- Pavane for harpsichord (1965)
- Studie for organ (1966)
- Divertimento [No. 1] for piano (1970)
- Divertimento No. 2 for piano (1977)
- Serenade voor Sylvia for piano (1981)

Vocal

- Drie gedichten (Three Poems) for vocal quartet (1927)
- Wees blij for voice and orchestra (1936)
- Wandellied for medium voice and piano (1947)
- Rosa Mystica for soprano and piano or orchestra (1958)

Choral

- Vierstemmige mis for male chorus and organ or orchestra (1962)
- Vier oude Volksliederen (Four Old Folk Songs) for mixed chorus and orchestra (1968)
- Klaaglied om de verdwenen reigers for mixed chorus and piano (1971)
- Zomer for mixed chorus a cappella (1973)

Incidental music

- Het raadsel, Incidental music (1938); play by Jef Mennekens
- Ezelsvel, Incidental music (1942); play by Henri Ghéon
- Momotaro, Incidental music (1943); play by Edgar Den Haene based on Momotarō from Japanese folklore
- Tim en de Chinese klok, Incidental music (1943); play by Martien De Beuck
- Saidjah, Incidental music (1946)
- O ha, de negerjongen, Incidental music (1952)
- Lorre, de papegaai van de more keizer, Incidental music (1953); play by Eugeen De Ridder
- Witje, Incidental music (1953); play by Alphonse Daudet
- Wij spelen Indiaan, Incidental music (1955); words by T. Brown and H. Finchnar
- De boom die leerde spreken, Incidental music (1958); words by Eugène Winters
