= Herk-de-Stad =

Herk-de-Stad: Herck-la-Ville (French)
- City and municipality
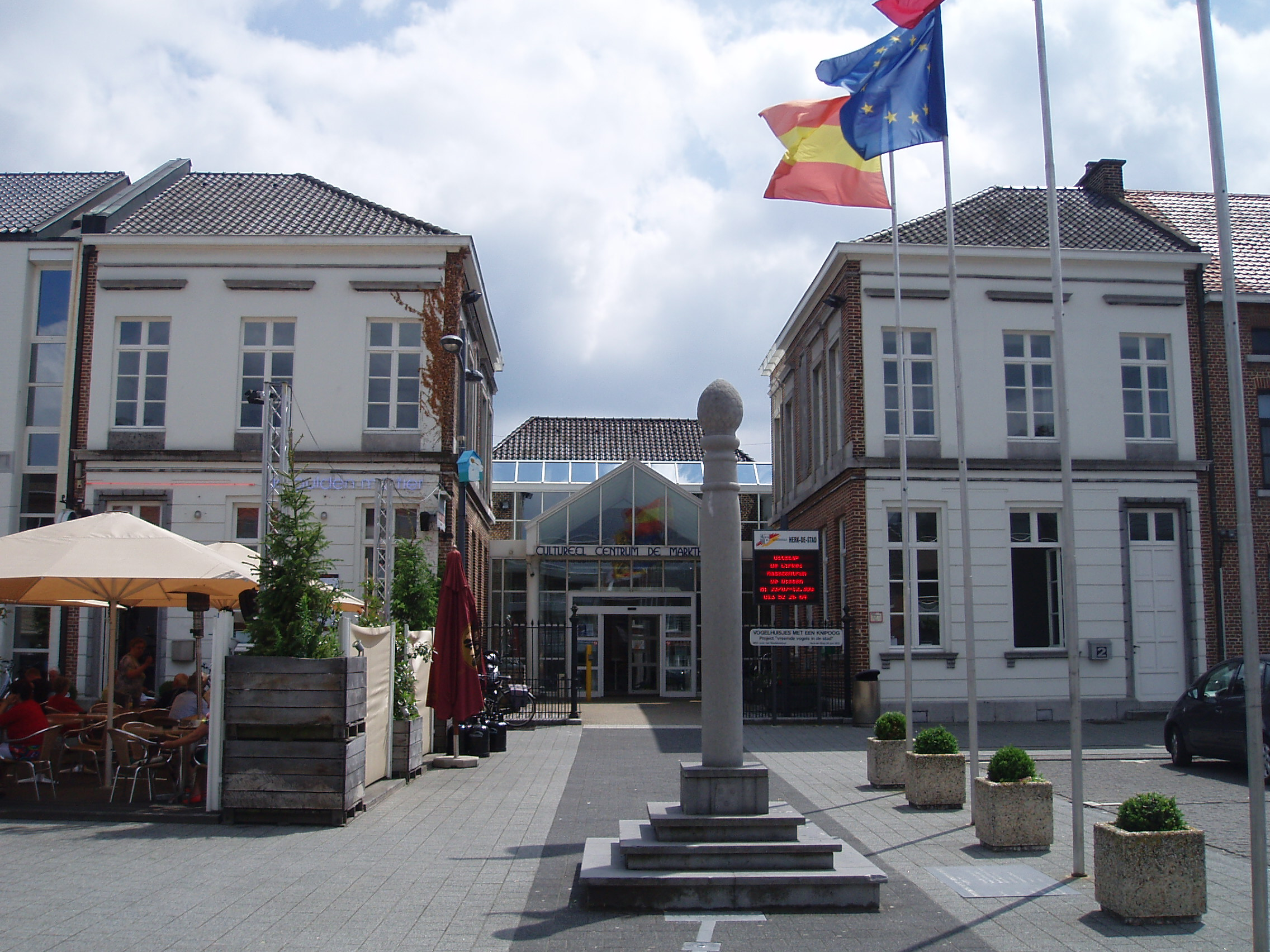

- Flag Coat of arms

- Location of Herk-de-Stad in Limburg
- Interactive map of Herk-de-Stad
- Location in Belgium
- Coordinates: 50°56′N 05°10′E
- Country: Belgium
- Community: Flemish Community
- Region: Flemish Region
- Province: Limburg
- Arrondissement: Hasselt

Government
  - Mayor: Bert Moyaers (Vooruit)
  - Governing parties: Vooruit, Open VLD, CD&V

Area
  - Total: 43.03 km^{2} (16.61 sq mi)

Population (2018-01-01)
  - Total: 12,661
  - Density: 294.2/km^{2} (762.1/sq mi)
- Postal codes: 3540
- NIS code: 71024
- Area codes: 013, 011
- Website: www.herk-de-stad.be

Herk-de-Stad (Dutch pronunciation: [ˈɦɛr(ə)ɡ də ˈstɑt]; French: Herck-la-Ville, French pronunciation: [ɛʁk la vil]) is a municipality and city located in the Belgian province of Limburg. On 1 January 2018, Herk-de-Stad had a total population of 12,661. The total area is 42.83 km^{2} which gives a population density of 296 inhabitants per km^{2}.

Besides the village of Herk-de-Stad itself, the municipality contains the communities of Berbroek, Schulen and Donk. Donk contains two country houses, both of the eighteenth-century, Kasteel Hamont and Kasteel Landwijk, which stands on the site of a castle established in the 12th century.

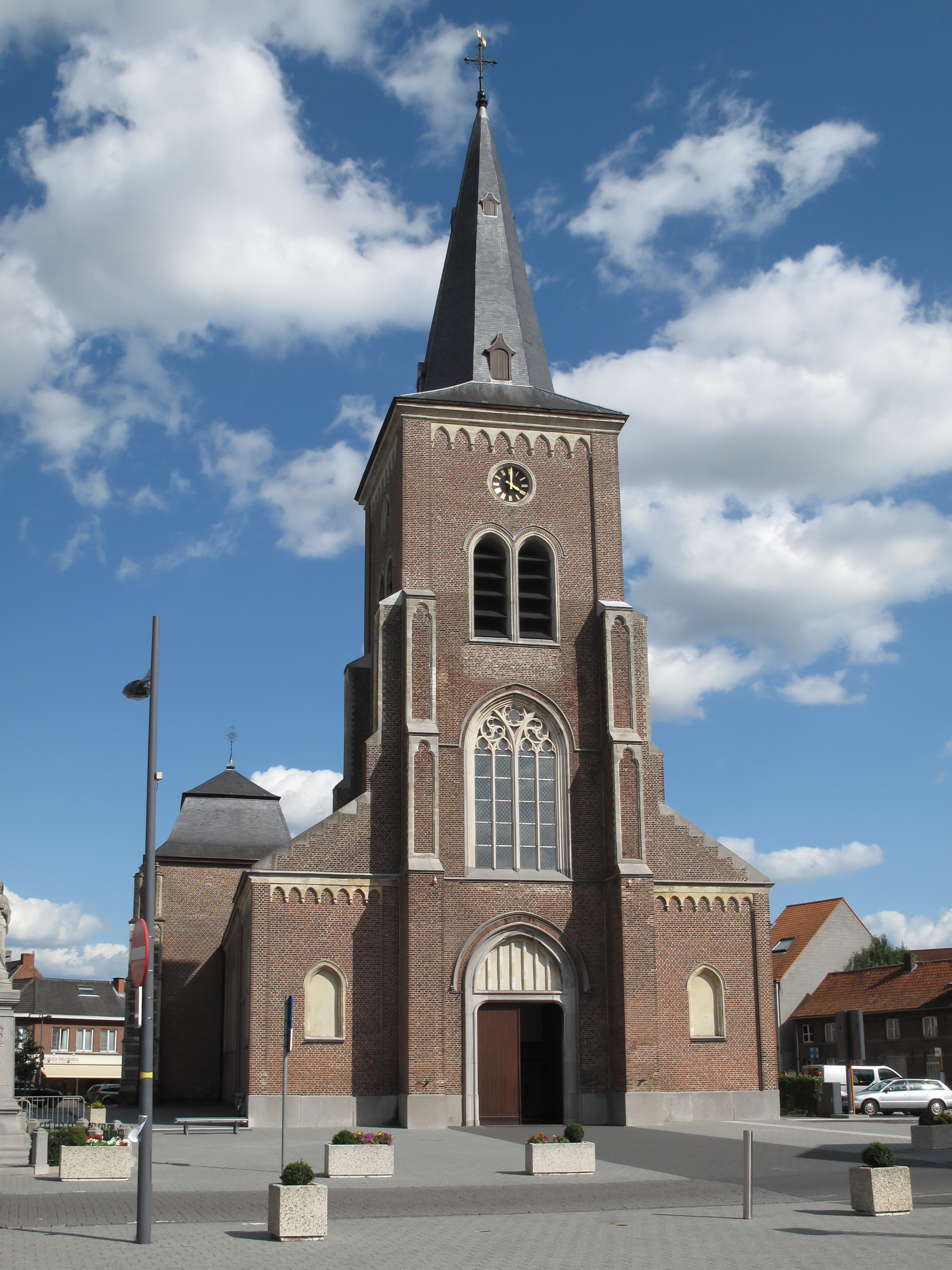
St. Martin's church

== Rock Herk ==
There is an annual rock festival in the village, Rock Herk. There is a balanced mix of techno, drum 'n bass, electronica, alternative rock, post-rock, punk-rock, hardcore punk, metal, stoner, rock 'n roll, and related genres. Bands that played in the past include Stretch Arm Strong, Isis, Explosions in the Sky, New Wet Kojak, Karate, Add N to (X), Thin White Rope, Swervedriver, Spiritualized, Cosmic Psychos, Slapshot, Southern Culture on the Skids, Barkmarket, and Godflesh.

== Notable people ==
- Virginie Claes, Miss Belgium 2006
- Annemie Coenen, the singer of former Ian Van Dahl now known as AnnaGrace
- Godefroy Wendelin, astronomer
