= Justine De Jonckheere =

Belgian model

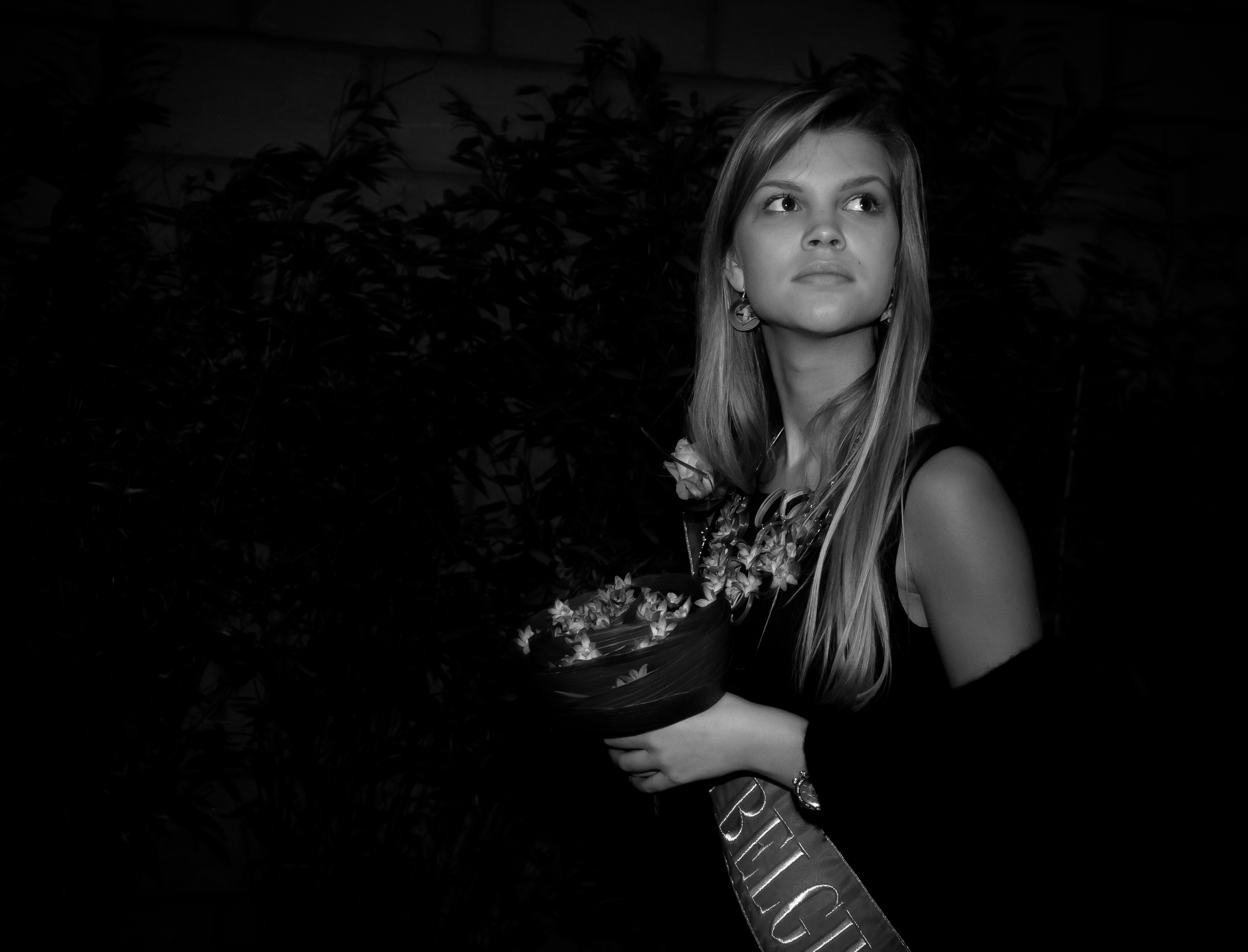
- Born: Justine De Jonckheere; 24 March 1992 (age 34); Menen, Belgium
- Height: 1.73 m (5 ft 8 in)
- Beauty pageant titleholder
- Title: Miss Belgium 2011
- Hair color: Blonde
- Eye color: Brown
- Major competitions: Miss Universe 2011 (Unplaced); Miss World 2011 (Unplaced)

Justine De Jonckheere (born 24 March 1992) is a Belgian model and beauty pageant titleholder who was crowned Miss Belgium 2011 and represented her country at the Miss Universe 2011 and Miss World 2011 pageants.

== Early life ==
Born in Menen, De Jonckheere lives in Wevelgem and is an only child. She studied law at KULAK - Kortrijk University and speaks Dutch, French and English.

== Modelling ==
She competed at Miss Belgium on 9 January 2011 in Knokke-Heist. De Jonckheere, who stands 1.73 m (5 ft 8 in) tall, competed as the representative of West Flanders against 15 other models. She won the contest, gaining the right to represent Belgium at Miss Universe 2011 and Miss World 2011.

At Miss Universe 2011 pageant, held in São Paulo, Brazil, on 12 September 2011, De Jonckheere represented her country alongside 88 other contestants, but failed to reach the Top 16.

Awards and achievements
Preceded by Cilou Annys	Miss Belgium; 2011	Succeeded by Laura Beyne
