= Laurence Borremans =

Belgian beauty pageant contestant

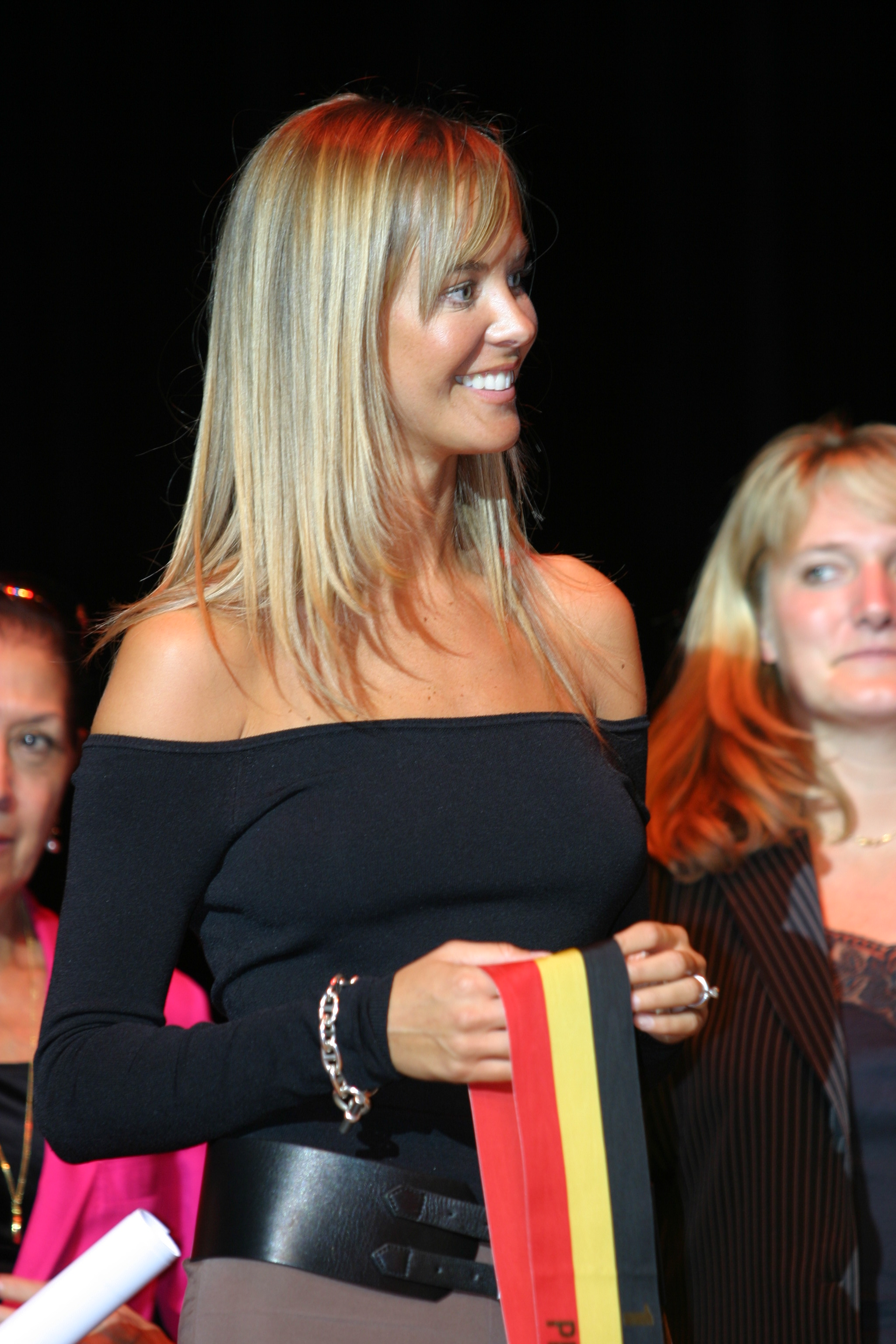
Laurence Borremans

Laurence Borremans (born 4 February 1978 in Limal, a part of Wavre) is a Belgian model and beauty pageant titleholder who was crowned Miss Belgium 1996 and a semi-finalist at the Miss World 1996 pageant.

Preceded by Veronique De Kock	Miss Belgium; 1996	Succeeded by Sandrine Corman
