= Ilse De Meulemeester =

Belgian actress and model

Ilse De Meulemeester (born Asse, 19 May 1971) is a Belgian actress, TV Host, model and beauty pageant titleholder who was Miss Belgium 1994. In the pageant she represented the province of Flemish Brabant. She was only the 2nd Miss Belgium to make it to the finals at the Miss World 1994 contest in South Africa. She obtained the 6th position. She was the first blond, first European in the Miss World contest in 1995.

Besides modelling and being a television presenter for the Belgian television station VT4, she used to have an interior shop in Brussels, Antwerp and Bruges.

Preceded by Stephanie Meire	Miss Belgium; 1994	Succeeded by Véronique De Kock
