= Kedist Deltour =

Belgian beauty pageant titleholder, Miss Belgium 2021

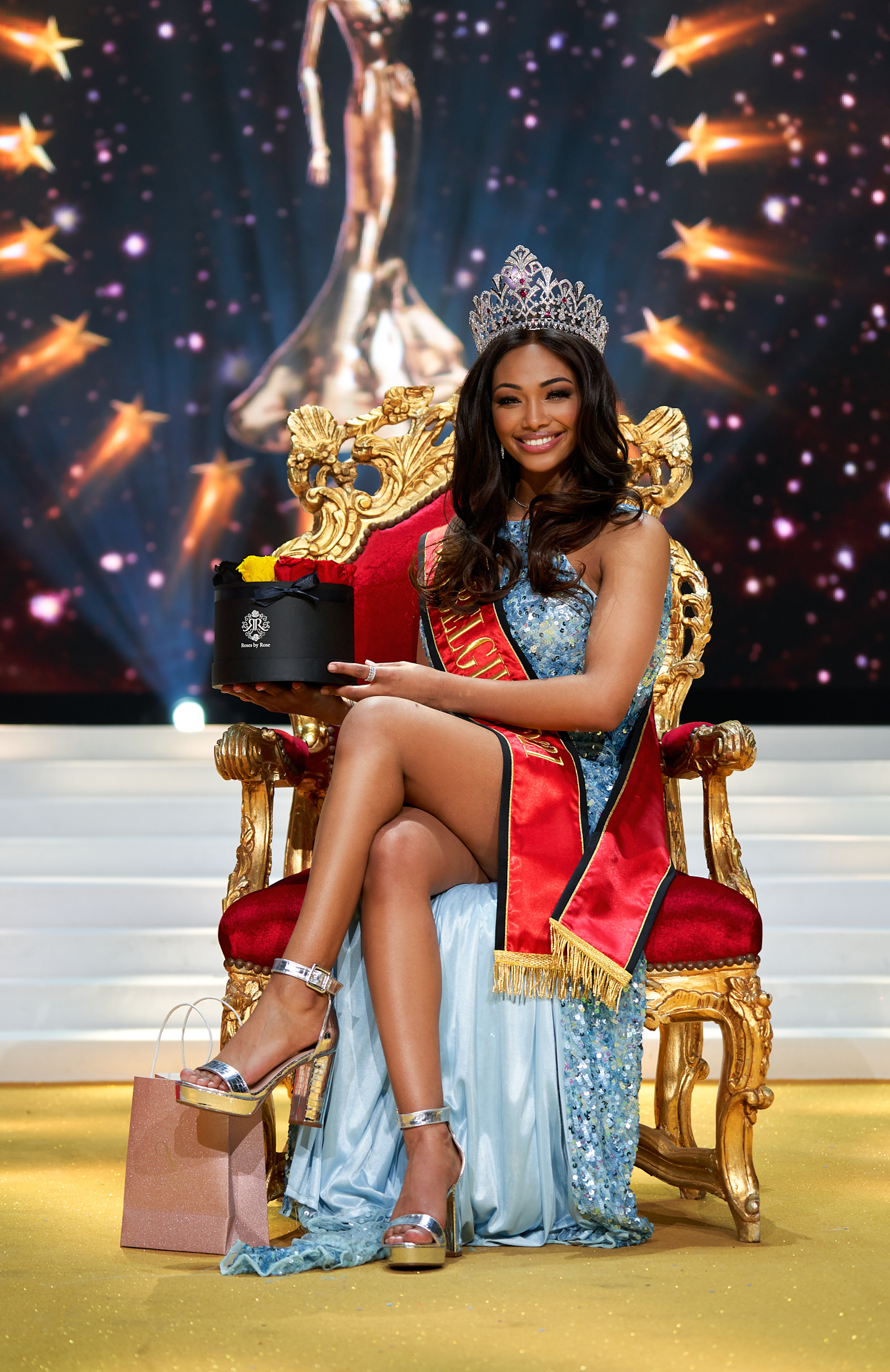
- Born: 29 July 1997 (age 29); Addis Ababa, Ethiopia
- Height: 1.67 m (5 ft 6 in)
- Beauty pageant titleholder
- Title: Miss East Flanders 2021; Miss Belgium 2021
- Major competitions: Miss Belgium 2021; (Winner); Miss Universe 2021; (Unplaced); Miss World 2023; (Top 40)

Kedist Deltour (born 29 July 1997) is a Belgian model and beauty pageant titleholder who was crowned Miss Belgium 2021. She represented her country at Miss World 2023 on March 9, 2024.

== Early life ==
Deltour was born in Addis Ababa in Ethiopia. When she was eight years old, her mother died of cancer. Afterwards, her father remarried; Deltour's stepmother was physically abusive, and when she was nine years old, her father left her and her siblings in an orphanage. When Deltour was ten years old, she and her siblings were adopted by a Belgian couple Peter and Nadège Deltour, and moved to Woesten in West Flanders. In Belgium, Deltour completed vocational training to become a hairdresser and later moved to Nazareth in East Flanders.

== Pageantry ==
Deltour began her career in pageantry in 2020, when she was crowned Miss East Flanders 2021, besting first runner-up Laura Baeyens. As Miss East Flanders, Deltour received the right to represent the province at Miss Belgium 2021. The Miss Belgium finals were held on 31 March 2021 in Adinkerke. Deltour is the eighth consecutive Flemish woman to win the title. As part of her prize package, she received a pink Volvo.

As Miss Belgium, Deltour represented Belgium at Miss Universe 2021, where she was unplaced, then at Miss World 2023, where she reached the top 40.

Awards and achievements
Preceded by Céline Van OuytselAntwerp	Miss Belgium; 2021	Succeeded by Chayenne van Aarle, Antwerp
