= Laura Beyne =

Miss Belgium 2012 (born 1992)

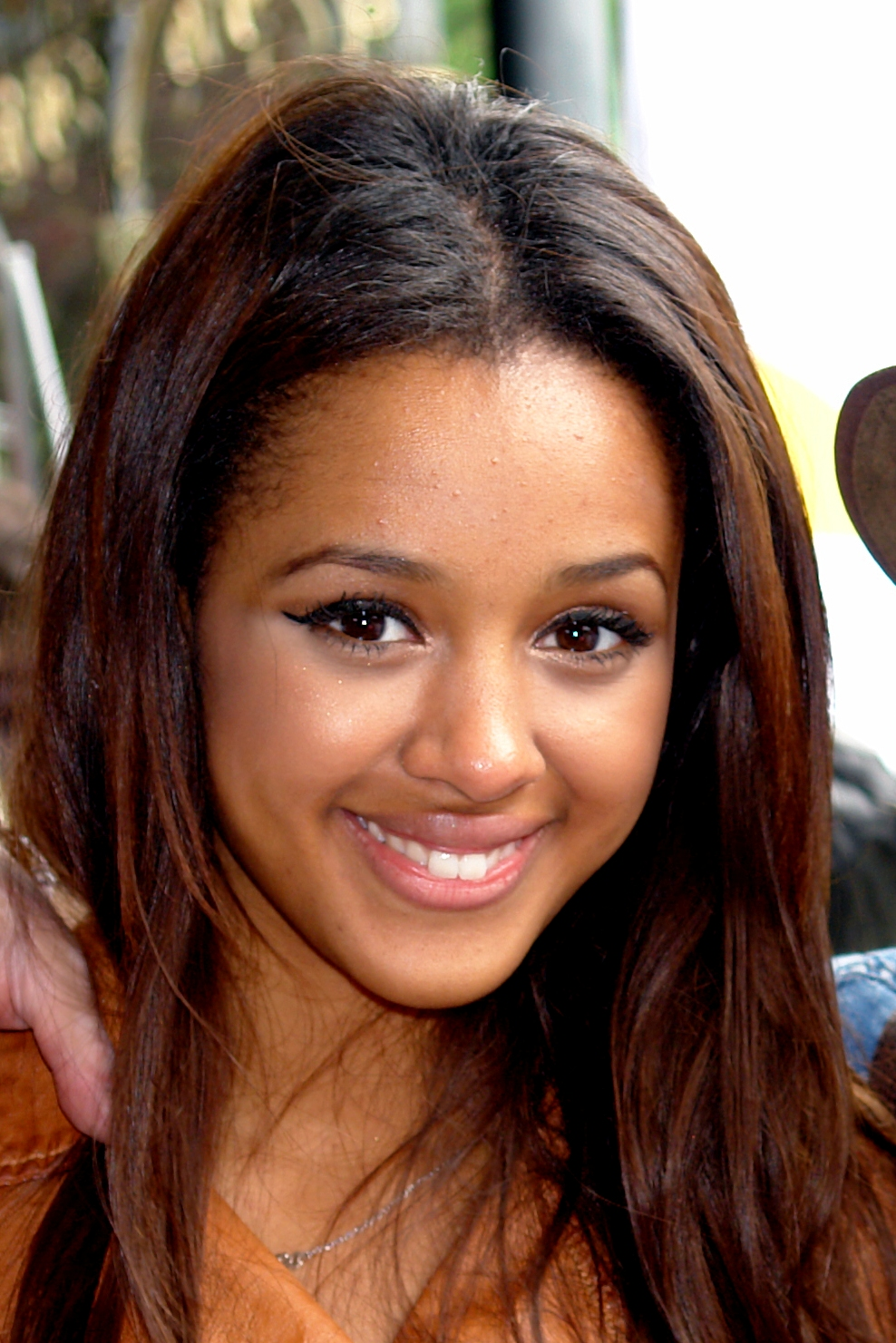
- Laura Beyne in 2012
- Born: Laura Beyne; 25 May 1992 (age 34); Brussels, Belgium
- Height: 1.73 m (5 ft 8 in)
- Beauty pageant titleholder
- Title: Miss Belgium 2012
- Major competitions: Miss Belgium 2012 (Winner); Miss Universe 2012 (Unplaced); Miss World 2012 (Unplaced)

Laura Beyne; (born 25 May 1992) is a Belgian TV host and beauty pageant titleholder who was crowned Miss Belgium 2012 and represented her country in the 2012 Miss Universe and Miss World pageants. She is also a TV host and has been the host of Belgian TV shows Place Royale and Plug People.

== Early life ==
Beyne was born in Brussels. She speaks English, French and Dutch. Her father is Belgian, her mother Congolese.

== Miss Belgium 2012 ==
Beyne was crowned Miss Belgium 2012 by Justine De Jonckheere (Miss Belgium 2011) at the Casino de Knokke in Knokke-Heist on 8 January 2012. Beyne represented Belgium in Miss World 2012 in Ordos, Inner Mongolia on 18 August 2012. She was the second black person to win Miss Belgium.

== Miss Universe 2012 ==
Beyne represented Belgium in Miss Universe 2012 held in Las Vegas.

== Television career ==
In February 2020, she was the host of a TV show about Whitney Houston called Whitney, My Idol, on Belgian TV station RTL-TVI. It was her first gig as a TV host.

In June 2021, she became the co-host of TV show Place Royale. For her first episode, she tested positive for COVID-19, and unable to do filming, so only her voice was used.

In November 2021, it was announced that she would be the host of a Belgian TV show called Plug People.

Awards and achievements
Preceded by Justine De Jonckheere	Miss Belgium; 2012	Succeeded by Noémie Happart
