= Annelien Coorevits =

Belgian TV host, model and beauty pageant titleholder

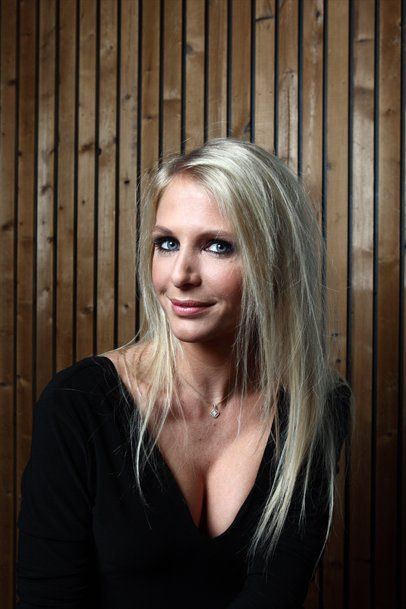
- Born: 1986 (age 38–39)

Annelien Coorevits (born 1986) is a Belgian TV host, model and beauty pageant titleholder who was crowned Miss Belgium 2007. She represented her country in Miss Universe 2007 but didn't place. She lives in Wijtschate.

Annelien Coorevits was married to Anderlecht-soccer player Olivier Deschacht but they have divorced. She is political active for the liberal party Open VLD and is a TV-presenter for VIJF.

Preceded by Virginie Claes	Miss Belgium; 2007	Succeeded by Alizée Poulicek
