= Miss Belgian Beauty =

Belgian beauty contest

The Miss Belgian Beauty contest is the second-largest beauty pageant in Belgium. It was first held in 1991 and is owned by Ignace Crombé.

== List of winners ==
Year	Miss Belgian Beauty	Province Represented
1992	Rani De Coninck	East Flanders
1993	Karina Beuthe	Hainaut
1994	Karolien Taverniers	Brussels
1995	Petra Winckelmans	Antwerp
1996	Stefanie Van Vyve	West Flanders
1997	Els Tibau	Flemish Brabant
1998	Liesbeth Van Bavel	East Flanders
1999	Darline Van Heule	Antwerp
2000	Caroline Ex	Antwerp
2001	Eveline Hoste	East Flanders
2002	Brunhilde Verhenne	East Flanders
2003	Zsofi Horvath	Antwerp
2004	Sofie Grosemans	Limburg
2005	Cynthia Reekmans	Limburg
2006	Céline Du Caju	East Flanders
2007	Anne-Marie Ilie	Antwerp
2008	Nele Somers	Antwerp
2009	Yoni Mous	Antwerp

== Per province ==
Province	Wins
Antwerp	7
East Flanders	5
Limburg	2
Brussels	1
Hainaut	1
West Flanders	1

== See also ==
- Miss Belgium
