= Noémie Happart =

Belgian model, Miss Belgium 2013

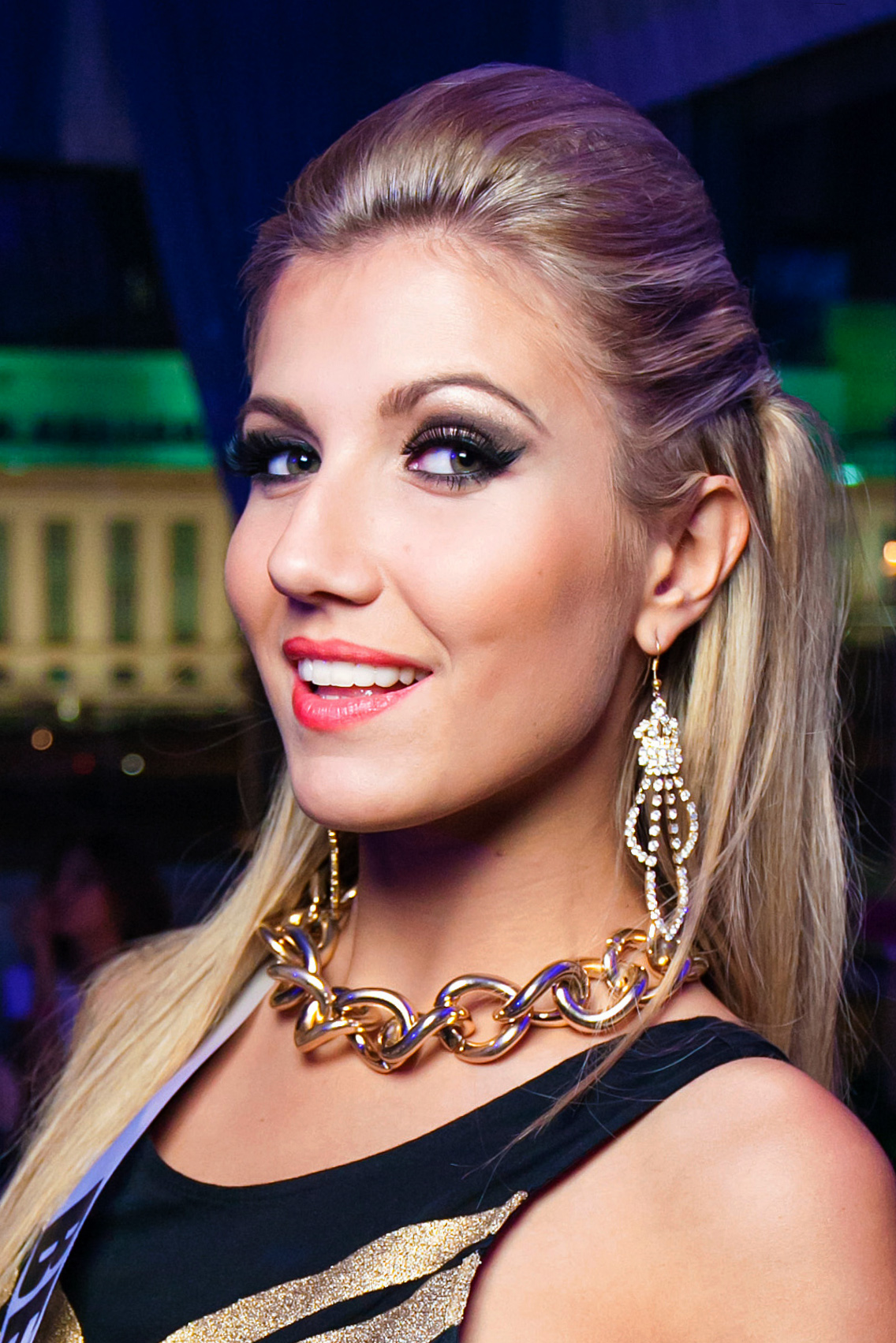
- Happart in 2013
- Born: Noémie Happart; 1 June 1993 (age 33); Liège, Belgium
- Height: 1.73 m (5 ft 8 in)
- Spouse: Yannick Carrasco (m. 2017)
- Beauty pageant titleholder
- Title: Miss Belgium 2013
- Hair color: Blonde
- Eye color: Green
- Major competitions: Miss Belgium 2013 (Winner); Miss Universe 2013 (Unplaced); Miss World 2013 (Top 20)

Noémie Happart (born 1 June 1993) is a Belgian model and beauty pageant titleholder who was crowned Miss Belgium 2013. She represented her country at Miss Universe 2013 and Miss World 2013.

== Miss Belgium 2013 ==
Noemie Happart, then a student at University of Liège, entered the Miss Belgium pageant with the title Miss Liège. As winner she was crowned Miss Belgium 2013 by Laura Beyne (Miss Belgium 2012) at the grand finale in Knokke Casino on the evening of Sunday 6 January 2013.

== Personal life ==
As the girlfriend, and later wife, of the professional footballer Yannick Carrasco, Happart gained further media attention as a "WAG". Carrasco celebrated his goal in the 2016 UEFA Champions League final by running into the crowd to kiss her, leading to international tabloid attention. The couple married in June 2017, with Happart accompanying her husband to China when he transferred to Dalian Yifang in 2018. Rumors that they had divorced circulated in 2020, which were later confirmed to be false. The couple has three children together.

Awards and achievements
Preceded by Laura Beyne	Miss Belgium; 2013	Succeeded by Laurence Langen
