= Virginie Claes =

Miss Belgium 2006

Virginie Claes (born 17 December 1982 in Herk-de-Stad, Limburg) is a Belgian TV host and beauty pageant titleholder.

== Biography ==
Claes was Miss Limburg 2006 and later that year she was crowned Miss Belgium 2006 and represented her country at Miss World 2006 but Unplaced.

She later became a television and radio presenter, including for French-language channels RTL-TVI and Bel RTL.

Preceded by Tatiana Silva Braga Tavares	Miss Belgium; 2006	Succeeded by Annelien Coorevits
