= Knokke Casino =

- Casino de Knokke; Casino Knokke
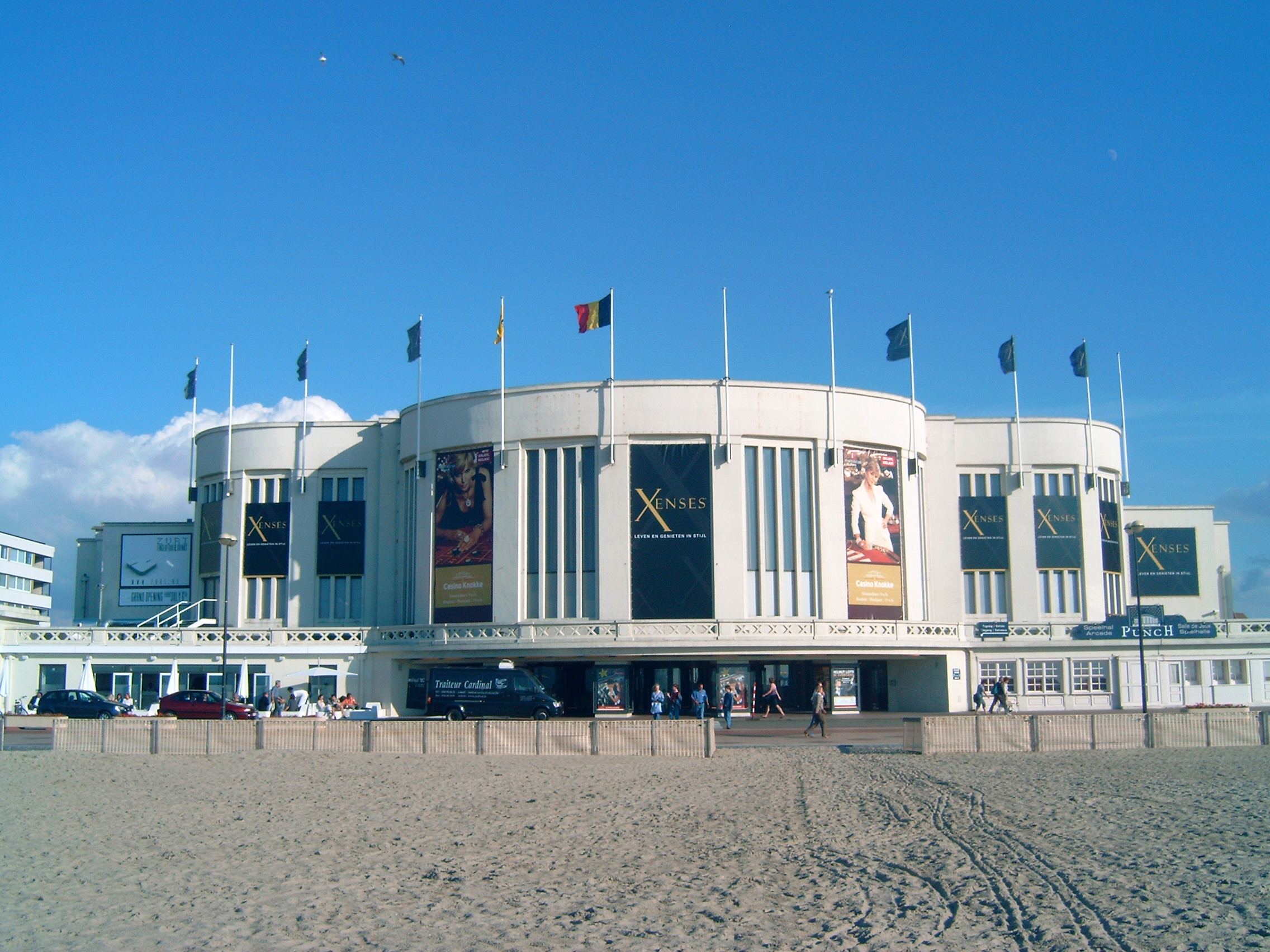
- The casino in 2007
- Interactive map of the Knokke Casino area

General information
- Type: Casino
- Location: Knokke, Belgium
- Coordinates: 51.3486°N 3.2786°E
- Construction started: 1929
- Inaugurated: 5 July 1930

Design and construction
- Architects: Léon Stynen; J. Selis

Knokke Casino (also called Knokke-Heist Casino; French: Casino de Knokke; Dutch: Casino Knokke) is a sea-front casino in the town of Knokke, in the administrative community Knokke-Heist, in the province of West Flanders in Flanders, Belgium.

== Description ==
The largest of Belgium's ten casinos, it is known for its permanent large-scale artworks by Keith Haring, René Magritte, and Paul Delvaux. It is the first of four casinos, in different Belgian towns, designed by Belgian architect Léon Stynen. The architectural style is said to have been influenced by Le Corbusier, along with Art Deco and the designer's Beaux-Arts training.

The late-1920s building was severely damaged during the Second World War. A subsequent renovation allowed surrealist master Magritte to create a giant 360° mural, finished in 1953, comprising eight panels called The Enchanted Domain.

Delvaux's Le Voyage Légendaire (1974), measuring 4.4 by 13 metres (14 ft × 43 ft), was originally installed at the Casino de Chaudfontaine, and later moved to the Knokke Casino. It shows a surreal outdoors panorama, depicting "the cave, the thick forest, the naked or dressed girls, the trains and tracks meticulously illustrated in the small station, the lights and electricity poles, the moon, the mailbox".

The Kroonluchterzaal (chandelier room) contains a 6-ton chandelier made of Venetian crystal. The chandelier has a diameter of 8.5 metres (28 ft) and is 6.5 metres (21 ft) high. Some 22,000 pieces of glass were used and 2,700 lamps light up the main hall. It was planned by architect J. Selis, designer Al David and created by the Murano glass factory "Fratelli Ferro".

Former members of the Casino's orchestra include, in the 1930s, composer and violist, Jef Maes.

In 2022, a project began to renovate the casino after a prior attempt to fully replace it failed. Design firms were invited to submit applications and five front-runners were selected in 2023. A coalition of three firms was selected to present a final design, which was presented in December 2023. The renovation is expected to be completed between 2030 and 2032.

== History ==
In 1929, Jozef Nellens began construction for the casino, which was soon officially opened on 5 July 1930. Nellens managed the business until his death in 1934, when his son Gustave Nellens took over. The casino was only open four months out of each year, during the summer season.

During World War II, the casino was partially occupied by German troops and heavily damaged by air raids. The building was restored by the original architect Léon Stynen, and was reopened in 1947.

Beginning in 1949, major exhibitions were organized every summer, displaying works by artists such as Pablo Picasso, Max Ernst, Salvador Dalí, and René Magritte. Other artists exhibited in the annual shows included Balthus, Joan Miró, Raoul Dufy, Paul Delvaux, Jean Tinguely, and Nikki de Saint Phalle.

The popularity of the casino grew with musical performances featuring artists such as Ray Ventura, Josephine Baker, Édith Piaf, Frank Sinatra, Nat King Cole, and Jacques Brel.

In the 1960s, the casino began opening year-round, as visitor traffic increased. In 1971, Jacques and Roger Nellens took over the management of the casino following the death of their father. The entertainment program was expanded with ballets, operas, concerts, poetry recitals, and film festivals; some events were televised. In 1987, further renovations were made to the building which resulted in the casino's current appearance. In 1990, the casino was recognized as part of the Flemish architectural heritage.

== Events ==
Among the events held at the casino are finals of the Miss Belgium contest, competitions to select the Belgian entry for the Eurovision Song Contest, and the premiere of Hugo Claus' dramatic sketch Masscheroen.

In July 1963, Jacques Brel headlined at casino for the fifth Coupe d'Europe de Tour de Chant. During this engagement, he performed the classic "Mathilde" for the first time.
