= Anissa Blondin =

Belgian model and beauty pageant titleholder

- Born: 1992 (age 33–34); Dworp, Beersel, Belgium
- Beauty pageant titleholder
- Title: Miss Flemish Brabant; Miss Universe Belgium 2014
- Hair color: Black
- Eye color: Black
- Major competitions: Miss Belgium 2014 (1st runner up); Miss World 2014 (Unplaced); Miss Universe 2014 (Unplaced)

Anissa Blondin (born 1992) is a Belgian model and beauty pageant titleholder who placed 1st runner up in Miss Belgium 2014. She competed at Miss World 2014 and Miss Universe 2014.

== Early life ==
She was born to a Belgian (Flemish) father and a Moroccan-Algerian mother. Blondin hails from Dworp, near Brussels. One of her hobbies is drawing comic books and mangas. She studied business engineering at the Vrije Universiteit Brussel, studying in Dutch. Her mother is French-speaking. She is Belgian bilingual, and also speaks English.

== Pageantry ==
=== Miss Belgium 2014 ===
Anissa was 1st runner up in Miss Belgie 2014 and represented Flemish Brabant.

=== Miss World 2014 ===
Blondin competed at Miss World 2014 in London but was not placed.

=== Miss Universe 2014 ===
Blondin participated in Miss Universe 2014, held in Doral, Florida, USA, but failed to advance to the Top 15.

Awards and achievements
Preceded by Noemie Happart	Miss Universe Belgium; 2014	Succeeded by Annelies Törös
