= Miss Belgium =

Beauty pageant

Miss Belgique, Miss België, Miss Belgien
- Formation: 1929; 97 years ago
- Type: Beauty pageant
- Headquarters: Brussels
- Location: Belgium
- Members: Miss Universe; Miss World
- Official language: Dutch; French
- President: Darline Devos
- Website: www.missbelgie.be

Miss Belgium is a national beauty pageant in Belgium. The winner of Miss Belgium automatically represents her country at the Miss World and Miss Universe pageants if the dates do not overlap.

== History ==
=== Queen of the Beach ===
The first contest looking for the most beautiful girl in Belgium was in 1928. It was journalist Jean-Jacques Fortis who organised the contest "La Reine de la Plage" - "The Queen of the Beach" as a promotion for the journal Piccolo, now Le Soir. It was Anne Koyaert who won the contest in Blankenberge.

=== Miss Belgium ===
Following the success, Fortis was allowed to organise a bigger election. In 1929, Jenny Vanparys was the first girl officially crowned Miss Belgium. She participated in Miss Europe. The next year, Netta Duchâteau was the winner. Duchâteau participated and won the International Pageant of Pulchritude in 1931, earning her the title "Miss Universe 1931". Duchâteau became an instant celebrity and the Miss Belgium contest got a lot of attention.

In 1968, Cécile Muller took interest in the contest. In 1969 she organised for the first time Miss Belgium. Muller, who thought herself to be a feminist, took the contest very serious. She demanded the participants of the contest to be bilingual - being able to talk Dutch and French, the two main languages of Belgium. Muller gave the participants training how to handle interviews. She also followed and guided the winner of the Miss Belgium-title very strictly. Thanks to the guidance of Muller, the contest became bigger every year. Muller saw the contest as an act of feminism and tried not to find the most beautiful face of Belgium but a modern young woman who could represent Belgium in every way. She succeeded on launching the contest at television. In 1993 the contest was broadcast on VTM for the Flanders region and at RTL for the Walloon region. A million viewers saw the elections of Miss Belgium that decennia. Many of those winners - including Goedele Liekens, Lynn Wesenbeek, Sandrine Corman, Dina Tersago and Julie Taton - had successful careers in television. For the election of 1994 a new golden crown was made by a crown maker of Paris.

In 2005, business woman Darline Devos became the new organiser of the election. She organized the election further. She succeeded in changing the preliminary provincial elections and applying the same rules in those contests. Every winner of those provincial contest was awarded one of the same eleven Swarovski-crowns. A new crown for Miss Belgium was made, consisting of 500 Swarovski-crystals. Devos also founded the Miss Belgium house, a house in the center of the country. It serves as the work place for the organisation of Miss Belgium and a place to stay for the reigning Miss Belgium. She made a new deal for the Dutch-speaking part of Belgium with broadcaster VT4. Although the girls of the next years were more successful at the Miss Universe and Miss World contests, the Belgian audience lost its interest in the election. Caused by declining viewership of the election, the contest was broadcast in the Dutch-speaking region by Vijftv, the small affiliate channel of VT4, in 2010-2011 and on digital broadcasters Life! in 2012, Studio 100 TV in 2013–2014, Ment TV in 2015, Fox Flanders in 2016-2018 and Eclips TV in 2019. In the French-speaking region broadcaster RTL stopped broadcasting the election in 2012. It was succeeded by digital broadcaster STAR TV in 2012 and AB3 in 2013–2018. Since 2019 the contest no longer broadcast in Wallonia. Additionally, the election also meets criticism in Wallonia because most winners are from Flanders.

Because of the COVID-19 pandemic, the election of Miss Belgium 2021 was postponed from January 2020 to March 2021. A new crown made of white stones and some pink stones as finisher debuted at the election of Miss Belgium 2021.

The Reigning Miss Belgium, Chayenne Van Aarle, had a major car accident during her last week of her reign. Since she was still recovering she wasn't able to be present at the election of her successor. The Miss Belgium 2023 pageant show was postponed due to suspicions of a terrorist attack. A suspect was arrested, weapons were found in his car and after the venue was fully searched, the show started with a delay.

=== Controversy ===
The Miss Belgium was met with controversy at different occasions. Miss Belgium 1952, Anne-Marie Pauwels refused to part from her boyfriend during the contest of Miss World 1952. She was disqualified and Belgium wasn't allowed to participate at Miss World 1953.

In 1971, the Dolle Mina's jumped on stage during the final of the election, yelling “We are not cattle!”.

Miss Belgium 2002, Ann Van Elsen, was one of the candidates who refused to participate in the Miss World competition held in Nigeria in to protest the conviction of Amina Lawal. This was against the wishes of the Miss Belgium organisation. Van Elsen was replaced by her first runner-up Sylvie Doclot.

Miss Belgium 2006, Virginie Claes, was accused of buying her title. No proof of this was found.

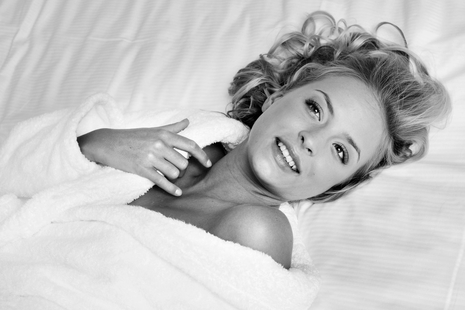
Alizée Poulicek, Miss Belgium 2008

The election of Alizee Poulicek, a native speaker of French and Czech, has even been linked to the 2007–08 Belgian government formation. The reason is that, during the traditional language test, she failed to speak or understand Dutch. The audience even booed her for this. The behaviour of the audience was noted across Europe, and the Flemish newspaper Het Laatste Nieuws sarcastically put the headline "Miss Belgium doesn't speak Dutch. Our country is in a deep crisis".

Miss Belgium 2017, Romanie Schotte, was accused of racism because of a post at Instagram. An investigation was started by Unia (the Center of Equal Opportunities) on 17 January but it was already closed on 19 January. In 2018 however, Miss Belgium 2018 Angeline Flor Pua, was met with much racism after winning. The Secretary of State of Equal Opportunities Zuhal Demir disapproved the racist comments and applauded the new Miss Belgium. The reaction of Flor Pua was well received and even broadcast on the BBC.

== Titleholders ==
=== La Reine de la Plage ===
Year	Miss Belgium	Province	Region	Notes
1928	Anne Koyaert	—	—	

=== Pre-World War II ===
Year	Miss Belgium	Province	Region	Notes
1929	Jenny Vanparays	Brussels	Brussels	
1930	Netta Duchâteau	Namur	Wallonia	Miss Universe 1931
1931	Suzanne Daudin	—	—	
1932	Simone Eraerts	Brussels	Brussels	
1933	Georgette Casteels	Brussels	Brussels	
1934	Nadia Benedetti	—	—	
1936	Laura Torfs	—	—	
1937	Josée Decœur	—	—	
1938	Mary Van Leda	—	—	
1939	Gilberte de Somme	Namur	Wallonia	

=== Post-World War II ===
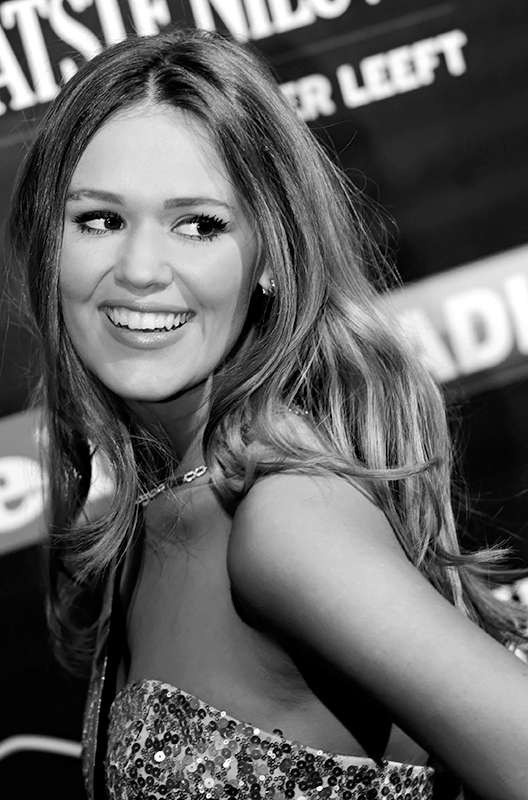
Annelies Törös, Miss Belgium 2015

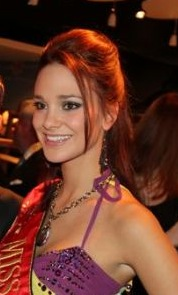
Cilou Annys, Miss Belgium 2010

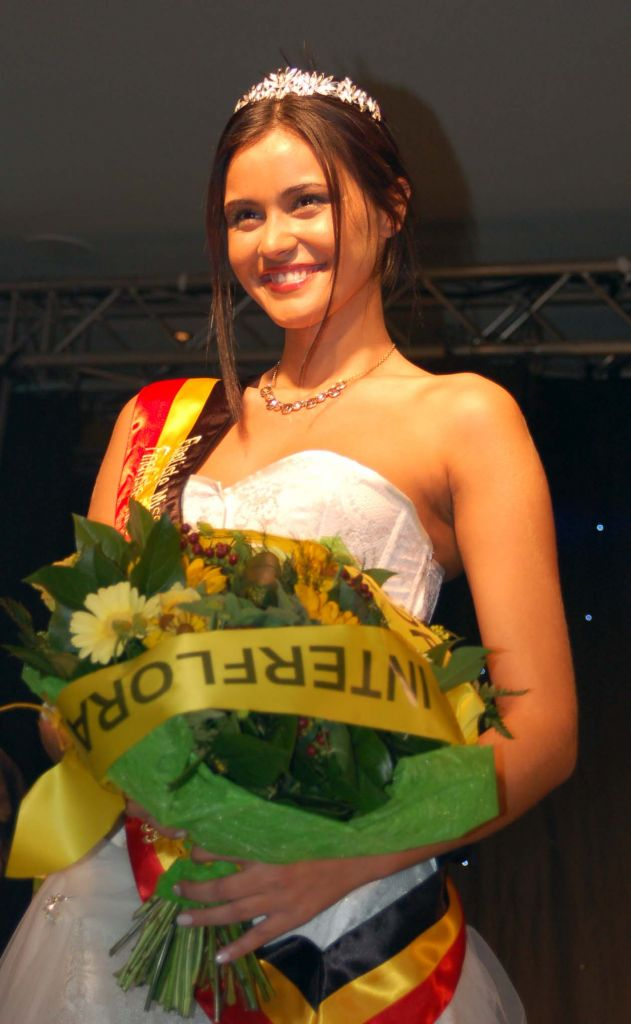
Zeynep Sever, Miss Belgium 2009

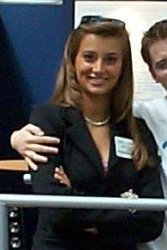
Véronique De Kock, Miss Belgium 1995

Year	Miss Belgium	Province	Region	Notes
1946	Ludovica Bil	—	—	
1947	Yvette Draux	Luxembourg	Wallonia	
1948	Lucienne Van de Weghe	Brussels	Brussels	
1949	Andréa Bouillon	—	—	
1950	Nicole Poncelet	Luxembourg	Wallonia	
1951	Lucienne Zadworny	—	—	
1952	Anne-Marie Pauwels	—	—	Disqualified at Miss World 1952
1953	Sépia Degehet	—	—	
1954	Nelly Dehem	Brussels	Brussels	
1955	Rosette Ghislain	Hainaut	Wallonia	
1956	Madeleine Hotelet	Brussels	Brussels	
1957	Jeanne Chandelle	Brussels	Brussels	
1958	Michèle Goethals	—	—	
1959	Diane Hidalgo	—	—	
1960	Huberte Bax	Brussels	Brussels	
1961	Nicole Ksinozenicki	—	—	
1962	Christine Delit	Liège	Wallonia	Top 8 at Miss World 1962
1963	Irène Godin	Liège	Wallonia	
1964	Danièle Defrère	Brussels	Brussels	
1965	Lucy Nossent	Liège	Wallonia	
1966	Mireille De Man	Brussels	Brussels	
1967	Mauricette Sironval	Liège	Wallonia	
1968	Sonja Doumen	Dilsen, Limburg	Flanders	
1969	Maud Alin	Hainaut	Wallonia	Miss World Friendship at Miss World 1969
1970	Francine Martin	Liège	Wallonia	
1971	Martine De Hert	Antwerp	Flanders	
1972	Anne-Marie Roger	Brussels	Brussels	Top 12 and Miss Photogenic at Miss Universe 1972
1973	Christiane De Visch	Antwerp	Flanders	3rd Runner-Up at Miss Europe 1973
1974	Anne-Marie Sikorski	Liège	Wallonia	
1975	Christine Delmelle	Liège	Wallonia	
1976	Yvette Aelbrecht	Brussels	Brussels	
1977	Claudine Vasseur	Brussels	Brussels	
1978	Maggy Moreau	Brussels	Brussels	
1979	Christine Cailliau	Brussels	Brussels	1st Runner-Up at Miss Europe 1980
1980	Brigitte Billen	Limburg	Flanders	
1981	Dominique Van Eeckhoudt	Brussels	Brussels	4th Runner-Up at Miss Universe 1981; Top 15 at Miss World 1981; Top 15 at Miss International 1981; Miss United Nations 1981
1982	Marie-Pierre Lemaître	Brussels	Brussels	
1983	Francoise Bostoen	West Flanders	Flanders	3rd Runner-Up at Miss Europe 1984; Top 15 at Miss World 1983
1984	Brigitte Muyshondt	Antwerp	Flanders	2nd Runner-Up at Miss International 1978
1985	An Van Den Broeck	Province	Flanders	
1986	Goedele Liekens	Flemish Brabant	Flanders	
1987	Lynn Wesenbeek	Antwerp	Flanders	
1988	Daisy Van Cauwenbergh	Antwerp	Flanders	
1989	Anne De Baetzelier	Flemish Brabant	Flanders	
1990	Katia Alens	Province	Flanders	Top 15 at Miss International 1990
1991	Anke Vandermeersch	Antwerp	Flanders	Top 6 at Miss Universe 1992
1992	Sandra Joine	Province	Flanders	
1993	Stephanie Meire	West Flanders	Flanders	
1994	Ilse De Meulemeester	Flemish Brabant	Flanders	Top 15 at Miss World 1994; Miss Herbal Essences Universe
1995	Véronique De Kock	Antwerp	Flanders	
1996	Laurence Borremans	Walloon Brabant	Wallonia	Top 15 at Miss World 1996
1997	Sandrine Corman	Liège	Wallonia	
1998	Tanja Dexters	Province	Flanders	
1999	Brigitta Callens	East Flanders	Flanders	
2000	Joke van de Velde	East Flanders	Flanders	
2001	Dina Tersago	Antwerp	Flanders	
2002	Ann Van Elsen	Antwerp	Flanders	
2003	Julie Taton	Namur	Wallonia	
2004	Ellen Petri	Antwerp	Flanders	Miss World Designer Dress Award at Miss World 2004
2005	Tatiana Silva	Brussels	Brussels	
2006	Virginie Claes	Limburg	Flanders	
2007	Annelien Coorevits	West Flanders	Flanders	
2008	Alizée Poulicek	Liège	Wallonia	
2009	Zeynep Sever	Brussels	Brussels	Top 15 at Miss Universe 2009
2010	Cilou Annys	West Flanders	Flanders	Top 15 at Miss Universe 2010
2011	Justine De Jonckheere	West Flanders	Flanders	
2012	Laura Beyne	Brussels	Brussels	
2013	Noémie Happart	Liège	Wallonia	Top 20 at Miss World 2013
2014	Laurence Langen	Limburg	Flanders	Did not compete internationally
2015	Annelies Törös	Antwerp	Flanders	Top 15 at Miss Universe 2015
2016	Lenty Frans	Antwerp	Flanders	Top 11 and Miss World Europe at Miss World 2016
2017	Romanie Schotte	West Flanders	Flanders	
2018	Angeline Flor Pua	Antwerp	Flanders	Top 30 at Miss World 2018
2019	Elena Castro Suarez	Antwerp	Flanders	
2020	Céline Van Ouytsel	Antwerp	Flanders	
2021	Kedist Deltour	East Flanders	Flanders	Top 40 at Miss World 2023
2022	Chayenne van Aarle	Antwerp	Flanders	
2023	Emilie Vansteenkiste	Flemish Brabant	Flanders	
2024	Kenza Ameloot	East Flanders	Flanders	
2025	Karen Jansen	Limburg	Flanders	Top 40 at Miss World 2025
2026	Olga Lombardo	Flemish Brabant	Flanders	

== Titleholders under Miss Belgium org. ==
=== Miss Universe Belgium ===
- : Declared as Winner
- : Ended as runner-up or top 5/6 qualification
- : Ended as one of the finalists or semifinalists
- : Ended as special awards winner

Miss Belgium has started to send a Miss Belgium to Miss Universe from 1952. On occasion, when the winner does not qualify (due to age) for either contest, a runner-up is sent.

Year	Province	Miss Universe Belgique	National Title	Placement at Miss Universe	Special awards
2026	Flemish Brabant	Olga Lombardo	Miss Belgique 2026	TBA	
2025	Limburg	Karen Jansen	Miss Belgique 2025	Unplaced	
2024	East Flanders	Kenza Ameloot	Miss Belgique 2024	Unplaced	
2023	Flemish Brabant	Emilie Vansteenkiste	Miss Belgique 2023	Unplaced	
2022	Antwerp	Chayenne van Aarle	Miss Belgique 2022	Unplaced	
2021	East Flanders	Kedist Deltour	Miss Belgique 2021	Unplaced	
2020	Antwerp	Dhenia Covens	Miss Belgique 2018; Second Runner-up	Unplaced	
2019	Antwerp	Angeline Flor Pua	Miss Belgique 2018	Unplaced	
2018	Namur	Zoé Brunet	Miss Belgique 2018; First Runner-up	Top 20	
2017	East Flanders	Liesbeth Claus	Miss Belgique 2017; Top 5	Unplaced	
2016	East Flanders	Stephanie Geldhof	Miss Belgique 2016; First Runner-up	Unplaced	
2015	Antwerp	Annelies Törös	Miss Belgique 2015	Top 15	
2014	Flemish Brabant	Anissa Blondin	Miss Belgique 2014; First Runner-up	Unplaced	
2013	Liège	Noémie Happart	Miss Belgique 2013	Unplaced	
2012	Brussels	Laura Beyne	Miss Belgique 2012	Unplaced	
2011	West Flanders	Justine De Jonckheere	Miss Belgique 2011	Unplaced	
2010	West Flanders	Cilou Annys	Miss Belgique 2010	Top 15	
2009	Brussels	Zeynep Sever	Miss Belgique 2009	Top 15	
2008	Liège	Alizée Poulicek	Miss Belgique 2008	Unplaced	
2007	West Flanders	Annelien Coorevits	Miss Belgique 2007	Unplaced	
2006	Brussels	Tatiana Silva	Miss Belgique 2005	Unplaced	
2005	Brussels	Debby De Waele	Miss Belgique 2005; First Runner-up	Unplaced	
2004	Brussels	Lindsy DeHollander	Miss Belgique 2004; First Runner-up	Unplaced	
2003	Namur	Julie Taton	Miss Belgique 2003	Unplaced	
2002	Antwerp	Ann Van Elsen	Miss Belgique 2002	Unplaced	
2001	Antwerp	Dina Tersago	Miss Belgique 2001	Unplaced	
2000	East Flanders	Joke van de Velde	Miss Belgique 2000	Unplaced	
1999	Antwerp	Tanja Dexters	Miss Belgique 1998	Unplaced	
1998	Liège	Sandrine Corman	Miss Belgique 1997	Unplaced	
1997	Walloon Brabant	Laurence Borremans	Miss Belgique 1996	Unplaced	
1996	Antwerp	Véronique De Kock	Miss Belgique 1995	Unplaced	
Did not compete in 1995
1994	Brussels	Christelle Roelandts	Miss Belgique 1994; First Runner-up	Unplaced	Best Hairstyle
1993	Antwerp	Sandra Joine	Miss Belgique 1992	Unplaced	
1992	Antwerp	Anke Vandermeersch	Miss Belgique 1991	Top 6	
1991	Antwerp	Katia Alens	Miss Belgique 1990	Unplaced	
Did not compete in 1990
1989	Flemish Brabant	Anne De Baetzelier	Miss Belgique 1989	Unplaced	
1988	Antwerp	Daisy Van Cauwenbergh	Miss Belgique 1988	Unplaced	
Did not compete in 1987
1986	Flemish Brabant	Goedele Liekens	Miss Belgique 1986	Unplaced	
1985	Antwerp	An Van Den Broeck	Miss Belgique 1985	Unplaced	
1984	Antwerp	Brigitte Muyshondt	Miss Belgique 1984	Unplaced	
1983	West Flanders	Francoise Bostoen	Miss Belgique 1983	Unplaced	
1982	Brussels	Marie-Pierre Lemaître	Miss Belgique 1982	Unplaced	
1981	Brussels	Dominique Van Eeckhoudt	Miss Belgique 1981	4th Runner-up	
1980	Limburg	Brigitte Billen	Miss Belgique 1980	Unplaced	
1979	Brussels	Christine Cailliau	Miss Belgique 1979	Unplaced	
1978	Brussels	Françoise Helene Julia Moens	Miss Belgique 1978; First Runner-up	Top 12	
1977	Brussels	Claudine Vasseur	Miss Belgique 1977	Unplaced	
1976	Brussels	Yvette Aelbrecht	Miss Belgique 1976	Unplaced	
1975	Liège	Christine Delmelle	Miss Belgique 1975	Unplaced	
1974	Liège	Anne-Marie Sikorski	Miss Belgique 1974	Unplaced	
1973	Antwerp	Christiane De Visch	Miss Belgique 1973	Unplaced	
1972	Brussels	Anne-Marie Roger	Miss Belgique 1972	Top 12	
1971	Antwerp	Martine De Hert	Miss Belgique 1971	Unplaced	
1970	Liège	Francine Martin	Miss Belgique 1970	Unplaced	
1969	Hainaut	Danièle Roels	Miss Belgique 1969; First Runner-up	Unplaced	
1968	Limburg	Sonja Doumen	Miss Belgique 1968	Unplaced	
1967	Liège	Mauricette Sironval	Miss Belgique 1967	Unplaced	
1966	Brussels	Mireille De Man	Miss Belgique 1966	Unplaced	
1965	Liège	Lucy Emilie Nossent	Miss Belgique 1965	Unplaced	
1964	Brussels	Danièle Defrère	Miss Belgique 1964	Unplaced	
1963	Liège	Irène Godin	Miss Belgique 1963	Unplaced	
1962	Liège	Christine Delit	Miss Belgique 1962	Unplaced	
1961	Brussels	Nicole Ksinozenicki	Miss Belgique 1961	Unplaced	
1960	Brussels	Huberte Box	Miss Belgique 1960	Unplaced	
1959	Brussels	Hélène Savigny	Miss Belgique Universe 1959	Top 15	
1958	Brussels	Liliane Taelemans	Miss Belgique Universe 1958	Unplaced	
1957	Brussels	Janine Hanotiau	Miss Belgique Universe 1957	Unplaced	
1956	Brussels	Lucienne Auquier	Miss Belgique Universe 1956	Top 15	
1955	East Flanders	Nicole De Meyer	Miss Belgique Universe 1955	Top 15	
1954	Walloon Brabant	Christiane Darnay Neckaerts	Miss Belgique Universe 1954	Unplaced	
1953	Brussels	Elayne Cortois	Miss Belgique Universe 1953	Unplaced	
1952	Brussels	Myriam Lynn	Mademoiselle Cine-Revue Belgique 1952	Unplaced	

=== Miss World Belgium ===
- : Declared as Winner
- : Ended as runner-up or top 5/6 qualification
- : Ended as one of the finalists or semifinalists
- : Ended as special awards winner

Year	Province	Miss World Belgique	National Title	Placement at Miss World	Special awards
2027	TBA	TBA	TBA	TBA	
2026	Flemish Brabant	Olga Lombardo	Miss Belgique 2026	Top 20	
2025	Limburg	Karen Jensen	Miss Belgique 2025	Top 40	
Miss World 2023 was rescheduled to 2024 due to the change of host and when entering India as the new host, there were several issues that caused the postponement until March 2024.
2023	East Flanders	Kedist Deltour	Miss Belgique 2021	Top 40	Head-to-Head Challenge (Top 25)
Miss World 2021 was rescheduled to 16 March 2022 due to the COVID-19 pandemic outbreak in Puerto Rico, no edition started in 2022
2021	Antwerp	Céline Van Ouytsel	Miss Belgique 2020	Unplaced	
Due to the impact of COVID-19 pandemic, no competition held
2019	Antwerp	Elena Castro Suarez	Miss Belgique 2019	Unplaced	
2018	Antwerp	Angeline Flor Pua	Miss Belgique 2018	Top 30	
2017	West Flanders	Romanie Schotte	Miss Belgique 2017	Unplaced	
2016	Antwerp	Lenty Frans	Miss Belgique 2016	Top 11	Miss World Europe
2015	West Flanders	Leylah Alliët	Miss Belgique 2015; First Runner-up	Unplaced	
2014	Flemish Brabant	Anissa Blondin	Miss Belgique 2014; First Runner-up	Unplaced	
2013	Liège	Noémie Happart	Miss Belgique 2013	Top 20	
2012	Brussels	Laura Beyne	Miss Belgique 2012	Unplaced	
2011	West Flanders	Justine De Jonckheere	Miss Belgique 2011	Unplaced	
2010	West Flanders	Cilou Annys	Miss Belgique 2010	Unplaced	
2009	Brussels	Zeynep Sever	Miss Belgique 2009	Unplaced	
2008	Liège	Alizée Poulicek	Miss Belgique 2008	Unplaced	
2007	Brussels	Halima Chehaima	Miss Belgique 2007; First Runner-up	Unplaced	
2006	Limburg	Virginie Claes	Miss Belgique 2006	Unplaced	
2005	Brussels	Tatiana Silva	Miss Belgique 2005	Unplaced	
2004	Antwerp	Ellen Petri	Miss Belgique 2004	Unplaced	
2003	Namur	Julie Taton	Miss Belgique 2003	Unplaced	
2002	Brussels	Sylvie Doclot	Miss Belgique 2002; First Runner-up	Unplaced	
2001	Antwerp	Dina Tersago	Miss Belgique 2001	Unplaced	
2000	East Flanders	Joke van de Velde	Miss Belgique 2000	Unplaced	
1999	East Flanders	Brigitta Callens	Miss Belgique 1999	Unplaced	
1998	Antwerp	Tanja Dexters	Miss Belgique 1998	Unplaced	
1997	Liège	Sandrine Corman	Miss Belgique 1997	Unplaced	
1996	Walloon Brabant	Laurence Borremans	Miss Belgique 1996	Top 10	
1995	Antwerp	Véronique De Kock	Miss Belgique 1995	Unplaced	
1994	Flemish Brabant	Ilse De Meulemeester	Miss Belgique 1994	Top 10	
1993	West Flanders	Stéphanie Meire	Miss Belgique 1993	Unplaced	
1992	Antwerp	Sandra Joine	Miss Belgique 1992	Unplaced	
1991	Antwerp	Anke Vandermeersch	Miss Belgique 1991	Unplaced	
1990	Antwerp	Katia Alens	Miss Belgique 1990	Unplaced	
1989	Brussels	Greet Ramaekers	Miss Belgique 1989; First Runner-up	Unplaced	
1988	Antwerp	Daisy Van Cauwenbergh	Miss Belgique 1988	Unplaced	
1987	Antwerp	Lynn Wesenbeek	Miss Belgique 1987	Unplaced	
1986	Flemish Brabant	Goedele Liekens	Miss Belgique 1986	Unplaced	
1985	Antwerp	An Van Den Broeck	Miss Belgique 1985	Unplaced	
1984	Antwerp	Brigitte Muyshondt	Miss Belgique 1984	Unplaced	
1983	West Flanders	Francoise Bostoen	Miss Belgique 1983	Top 15	
1982	Brussels	Marie-Pierre Lemaître	Miss Belgique 1982	Unplaced	
1981	Brussels	Dominique Van Eeckhoudt	Miss Belgique 1981	Top 15	
1980	Limburg	Brigitte Billen	Miss Belgique 1980	Unplaced	
1979	Brussels	Christine Cailliau	Miss Belgique 1979	Unplaced	
1978	Brussels	Françoise Helene Julia Moens	Miss Belgique 1978; First Runner-up	Unplaced	
1977	Brussels	Claudine Vasseur	Miss Belgique 1977	Unplaced	
1976	Brussels	Yvette Aelbrecht	Miss Belgique 1976	Unplaced	
1975	Liège	Christine Delmelle	Miss Belgique 1975	Unplaced	
1974	Liège	Anne-Marie Sikorski	Miss Belgique 1974	Unplaced	
1973	Antwerp	Christiane De Visch	Miss Belgique 1973	Unplaced	
1972	Brussels	Anne-Marie Roger	Miss Belgique 1972	Unplaced	
1971	Antwerp	Martine De Hert	Miss Belgique 1971	Unplaced	
1970	Liège	Francine Martin	Miss Belgique 1970	Unplaced	
1969	Hainaut	Maud Alin	Miss Belgique 1969	Unplaced	Miss Friendship

== Media ==
=== Television ===
In 1993, the election of Miss Belgium debuted on television. Since then, the election was broadcast every year.

Miss Belgium	Date	Winner	Presentation		Broadcaster	
Miss Belgium	Date	Winner	Flanders	Wallonia	Flanders	Wallonia
1993	?	Stephanie Meire	Lynn Wesenbeek	?	VTM	RTL
1994	?	Ilse De Meulemeester	Lynn Wesenbeek	?	VTM	RTL
1995	?	Véronique De Kock	Lynn Wesenbeek	?	VTM	RTL
1996	?	Laurence Borremans	Lynn Wesenbeek	?	VTM	RTL
1997	?	Sandrine Corman	Lynn Wesenbeek	?	VTM	RTL
1998	?	Tanja Dexters	Lynn Wesenbeek	?	VTM	RTL
1999	?	Brigitta Callens	Lynn Wesenbeek	?	VTM	RTL
2000	?	Joke van de Velde	Lynn Wesenbeek	?	VTM	RTL
2001	8-12-2000	Dina Tersago	Francesca Vanthielen	Jean-Michel Zecca	VTM	RTL
2002	7-12-2001	Ann Van Elsen	Francesca Vanthielen	Jean-Michel Zecca	VTM	RTL
2003	29-11-2002	Julie Taton	Francesca Vanthielen	Jean-Michel Zecca	VTM	RTL
2004	12-12-2003	Ellen Petri	Francesca Vanthielen	Jean-Michel Zecca	VTM	RTL
2005	12-12-2004	Tatiana Silva	Francesca Vanthielen	Jean-Michel Zecca	VTM	RTL
2006	18-12-2005	Virginie Claes	Francesca Vanthielen	Jean-Michel Zecca	VTM	RTL
2007	19-12-2006	Annelien Coorevits	Francesca Vanthielen	Jean-Michel Zecca	VTM	RTL
2008	15-12-2007	Alizée Poulicek	Véronique De Kock	Jean-Michel Zecca	VT4	RTL
2009	23-12-2008	Zeynep Sever	Véronique De Kock	Jean-Michel Zecca	VT4	RTL
2010	10-1-2010	Cilou Annys	Véronique De Kock	Sandrine Corman	Vijftv	RTL
2011	9-1-2011	Justine De Jonckheere	Véronique De Kock	Sandrine Corman	Vijftv	RTL
2012	5-3-2012	Laura Beyne	Véronique De Kock	Sophie Pendeville	Life!	STAR TV
2013	6-1-2013	Noémie Happart	Véronique De Kock	Jean-Luc Bertrand	Studio 100 TV	AB3
2014	11-1-2014	Laurence Langen	Véronique De Kock	Patrick Ridremont	Studio 100 TV	AB3
2015	10-1-2015	Annelies Törös	Véronique De Kock	Patrick Ridremont	Ment TV	AB3
2016	9-1-2016	Lenty Frans	Véronique De Kock	Patrick Ridremont	Fox Flanders	AB3
2017	14-1-2017	Romanie Schotte	Véronique De Kock	Patrick Ridremont	Fox Flanders	AB3
2018	13-1-2018	Angeline Flor Pua	Véronique De Kock	Patrick Ridremont	Fox Flanders	AB3
2019	12-1-2019	Elena Castro Suarez	Virginie Claes	/	Eclips TV	AB3
2020	11-1-2020	Céline Van Ouytsel	Virginie Claes	Gaëtan Bartosz	Eclips TV	RTL Play
2021	31-3-3021	Kedist Deltour	Virginie Claes	Jill Vandermeulen	Eclips TV	RTL Play
2022	26-3-2022	Chayenne van Aarle	Virginie Claes	Gaëtan Bartosz	Eclips TV	Sudinfo
2023	11-2-2023	Emilie Vansteenkiste	Virginie Claes	Gaëtan Bartosz	Eclips TV	Sudinfo

In 2002 and 2003, VTM aired the docuseries Miss België, achter de schermen about the candidates and the preparation for the election show. In 2008, when the show was moved to broadcoaster VT4, a new docusoap Wie wordt Miss België 2008 aired.

=== Books ===
In 1999, Miss Belgium-organiser Cécile Muller wrote a book about her 30 year experience of the contest and the 600 girls she guided.

In 2007 a book Een leven als Miss België was released. It included a timeline about the contest, interviews of 15 ex-winners and the diary of Miss Belgium 2007, Annelien Coorevits.

== See also ==
- Mister Belgium Personality
- Miss International Belgium
- Miss Grand Belgium
- Miss Earth Belgium
- Miss Belgian Beauty
