= Véronique De Kock =

Belgian businesswoman and TV personality

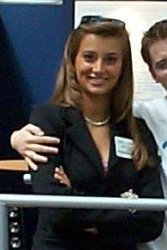
Véronique de Kock

Véronique De Kock (born 3 April 1977 in Antwerp, Belgium) is a Belgian business owner, television presenter and beauty pageant titleholder.

== Biography ==
=== Career ===
At the age of 15, De Kock was already a model in Belgium, France, Germany and Italy. She has been featured on the covers of the magazines P-Magazine, Ché, and HUMO.

When she was 17, she won the title of Miss Flanders and one year later she won the prestigious title of Miss Belgium 1995. She competed at Miss World 1995 and Miss Universe 1996 but failed to place in the top 10 in both pageants.

In 2013 she was a contestant in the VTM-program De Grote Sprong, a diving contest.

From 2008 to 2018, she was the co-presenter of the Miss Belgium pageant. During the 2012 edition, she tripped on her long dress and fell as she was entering the stage at the very beginning of the pageant.

In later years De Kock opened a fashion store, '1995 by Véro' in Schilde, and relocated it to Brasschaat in 2019.

=== Personal life ===
From 2001, De Kock was dating Frank Slaets. They have a son, Sébastien, born on January 30, 2005. They

In 2019, De Kock married entrepreneur Manuel Goossens.

Preceded by Marie-Rose Morel	Miss Flanders; 1995	Succeeded by
Preceded by Ilse De Meulemeester	Miss Belgium; 1995	Succeeded by Laurence Borremans
