= 1990 in Belgium =

- Decades: 1970s; 1980s; 1990s; 2000s; 2010s
- See also: Other events of 1990; List of years in Belgium

Events in the year 1990 in Belgium.

== Incumbents ==
- Monarch: Baudouin
- Prime Minister: Wilfried Martens

== Events ==
- 4 to 5 April – Constitutional crisis: King Baudouin suspended as king for 36 hours after refusing to sign a law legalising abortion
- 26 June – City of Antwerp adopts the Globaal structuurplan, a first attempt at structured urban planning for the whole city and regeneration of dockland neighbourhoods.
- 28 October – German-speaking Community Council election

== Publications ==
- Brian Bond, Britain, France, and Belgium, 1939-1940 (Brassey's)
- B. Francq and D. Lapeyronnie, Les deux morts de la Wallonie sidérurgique
- Donald Flanell Friedman, The Symbolist Dead City: A Landscape of Poesis (Garland)
- Leen Van Molle, Ieder voor allen: De Belgische Boerenbond, 1890–1990 (Leuven University Press, Kadoc Studies 9)

Drama

- Hugo Claus, Four Works for the Theatre, translated by David Willinger, Luk Truyts and Luc Deneulin

== Art and architecture ==
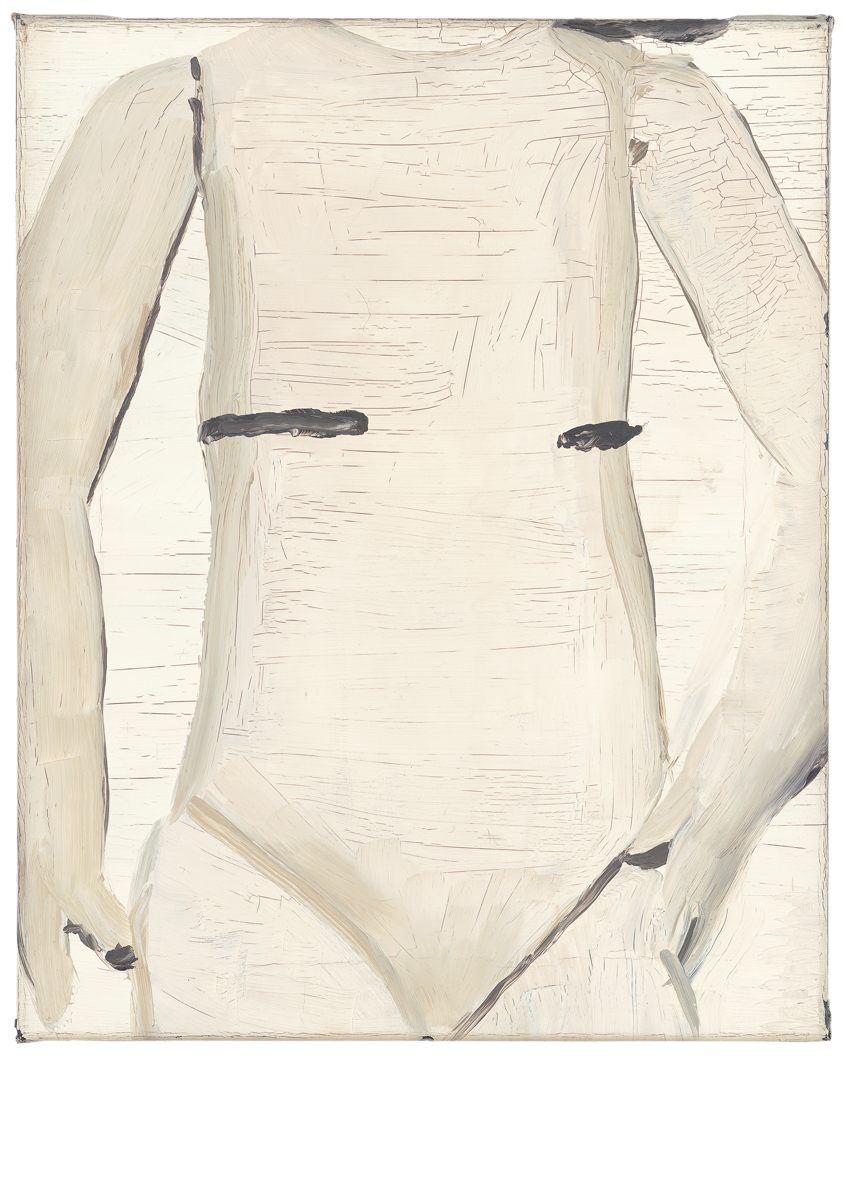
Luc Tuymans, Body (1990)

Cinema releases

- Koko Flanel, directed by Stijn Coninx

Visual arts

- Jan Fabre, Tivoli
- Luc Tuymans, Body

== Births ==
- 1 January – Fazlı Kocabaş, footballer
- 10 January – Jeroen D'hoedt, athlete
- 13 March – Anne Zagré, athlete
- 18 May – Dimitri Daeseleire, footballer
- 12 April - Eline Powell, actress
- 31 May – Amelie Lens, DJ
- 23 March – Raffaele Chiarelli, footballer
- 21 June – Nadine Khouzam, hockey player
- 12 July – Yassine El Ghanassy, footballer
- 18 July – Laurine Delforge, hockey umpire
- 19 July – Laurens Paulussen, footballer
- 21 July – Evelyn Arys, cyclist
- 12 August – Danira Boukhriss, newscaster
- 28 August – Louis Verhelst, cyclist
- 26 September – Jade Foret, model
- 6 October – François D'Onofrio, footballer
- 16 October – Antoine Demoitié, athlete (died 2016)
- 28 November – Dedryck Boyata, footballer
- 22 December – Juliette Van Dormael, cinematographer
- 24 December – Thomas Van der Plaetsen, athlete

== Deaths ==
- 11 February – Léopold Anoul (born 1922), footballer
- 12 February – Gustaaf Hulstaert (born 1900), entomologist
- 5 March – Karel Thijs (born 1918), cyclist
- 14 March – Léo Souris (born 1911), composer
- 7 June – Max Loreau (born 1928), philosopher
- 8 June – Remy Van Lierde (born 1915), fighter pilot
- 9 June – Charles Paul de Cumont (born 1902), general
- 19 June – Karel Sys (born 1914), boxer
- 29 June – René Boël (born 1899), industrialist
- 5 July – Simona Noorenbergh (born 1907), missionary
- 13 August – André Canonne (born 1937), writer and librarian
- 27 August – Gérard Garitte (born 1914), Orientalist
- 28 August – Robert Jan Verbelen (born 1911), collaborator
- 30 August – Jacques Grippa (born 1913), politician
- 2 September – Léon Van Hove (born 1924), scientist
- 14 September – Wim De Craene (born 1950), singer
- 30 October – Germaine Van Dievoet (born 1899), Olympic swimmer
- 3 December – André Vlerick (born 1919) economist and politician
- 11 December – Fernand Collin (born 1897), banker
