= 1986 in Belgium =

- Decades: 1960s; 1970s; 1980s; 1990s; 2000s
- See also: Other events of 1986; List of years in Belgium

Events in the year 1986 in Belgium.

== Incumbents ==
- Monarch: Baudouin
- Prime Minister: Wilfried Martens

== Events ==
January

- 1 January – Breakout of 14 inmates from Arlon prison.
- 25 January – About 3,000 gendarmes demonstrate in Brussels for better working conditions.

February

- 5 February – Publication of a report into working practices in the Belgian postal service reveals massive inefficiency.

March

- 17 March – Albert Houssiau appointed bishop of Liège by Pope John Paul II

April

- 12 April – About 20,000 march in Hasselt to demand that Limburg's mines be kept open.
- 15 April – Prime Minister Wilfried Martens and Deputy Prime Minister Guy Verhofstadt lay the first stone of the Flanders Expo convention centre in Ghent.
- 29 April – R.W.D. Molenbeek football club goes into receivership.

May

- 3 May – Sandra Kim wins the Eurovision Song Contest 1986 singing "J'aime la vie".
- 18 May – Albert Houssiau consecrated bishop of Liège
- 29 May – The Flag of Europe first flown in front of the Commission of the European Communities in Brussels.
- 30 May – About 50,000 protest against government austerity measures in a demonstration organised by the General Federation of Belgian Labour.

June

- 25 June – Former prime minister Paul Vanden Boeynants convicted of fraud.
- 30 June – Massive public celebration of the return of the Belgium national football team after placing fourth in the 1986 FIFA World Cup in Mexico.

October

- 12 October – Renovated La Monnaie opera house reopens with a performance of Beethoven's Ninth Symphony.
- 18 October – Interior Minister Charles-Ferdinand Nothomb resigns in protest over the government's stance on the language struggle in Voeren.
- 21 October – An accident occurs in Kwaadmechelen with a Transnuklear transport from Krümmel Nuclear Power Plant to SCK CEN in Mol. Nuclear waste being transported does not correspond to the documents, later bringing a bribery scandal to light.
- 26 October – German-speaking Community Council election

November

- 14 November – Hugo Claus receives the Prijs der Nederlandse Letteren for The Sorrow of Belgium.

December

- 12 December – A bank robber shot by police in Anderlecht turns out to be a policeman himself.

== Publications ==
Reference series

- Biographie Nationale de Belgique, vol. 44 (supplement 16).
- OECD, Economic Surveys, 1985/1986: Belgium, Luxembourg

Books

- Jonathan E. Helmreich, Gathering Rare Ores: The Diplomacy of Uranium Acquisition, 1943–1954 (Princeton University Press)

== Art and architecture ==
Films

- Chantal Akerman (dir.), Golden Eighties

== Births ==
- 13 February – Sylvie De Caluwé, model
- 21 February – Prince Amedeo of Belgium, Archduke of Austria-Este
- 13 March – Ludovic Buysens, footballer
- 20 April – Onur Kaya, footballer
- 1 August – Michaël Van Geele, footballer
- 15 October – Sandra Kim, singer
- 22 October – Murat Akın, footballer
- 3 December – Annelien Coorevits, beauty queen

== Deaths ==
- 7 February – Armand Preud'homme, composer
- 3 April – Charles Moeller, scholar
- 2 June – Daniel Sternefeld, conductor
- 6 July – Flor Peeters, organist
- 23 August – Charles Janssens, actor
- 5 October – Jozef van Overstraeten, founder of the Flemish automobile association
- 16 October – Arthur Grumiaux, violinist
- 16 December – Marcel Quinet, composer
- 27 December – Louis Van Lint, painter
- 28 December – Karel Aerts, director of the BRT
