= 1985 in Belgium =

- Decades: 1960s; 1970s; 1980s; 1990s; 2000s
- See also: Other events of 1985; List of years in Belgium

Events in the year 1985 in Belgium.

== Incumbents ==
- Monarch: Baudouin
- Prime Minister: Wilfried Martens

== Events ==
- 15 January – Communist Combatant Cells (CCC) bomb the Federation of Belgian Enterprises, killing two firemen and wounding others.
- 3 February – Roger Vangheluwe consecrated as bishop of Bruges by Cardinal Godfried Danneels
- 16 to 21 May – Pope John Paul II visits Belgium
- 29 May – Heysel Stadium disaster
- 15 September – Ayrton Senna wins the 1985 Belgian Grand Prix at Spa-Francorchamps
- 27 September – Brabant killers carry out armed robberies in Braine-l'Alleud and Overijse, killing eight.
- 8 October to 5 November – CCC firebomb a series of companies
- 13 October – General elections
- 9 November – Brabant killers carry out an armed robbery in Aalst, killing eight.
- 6 December
  - CCC attack NATO pipeline in Wortegem-Petegem
  - Liège law court bombing

== Publications ==
- T. Luykx and M. Platel, Politieke geschiedenis van België van 1944 tot 1985 (2 vols., Antwerp, Kluwer).

== Art and architecture ==
Films

- Hugo Claus (dir.), De Leeuw van Vlaanderen
- Nicole Van Goethem (dir.), A Greek Tragedy

== Births ==
- 5 January – Bart Goossens, footballer
- 1 February – Tim De Meersman, footballer
- 5 February – Tatiana Silva, beauty queen
- 15 February – Sara Peeters, cyclist
- 12 March – Stromae, musician and producer
- 16 March – Saskia Bricmont, politician
- 3 May – Robin Tonniau, politician
- 10 May - Farah Jacquet, politician
- 20 June – Dieter Vanthourenhout, cyclist
- 10 July – Funda Oru, politician
- 5 August – Joeri Calleeuw, cyclist
- 14 September – Stijn Neirynck, cyclist
- 25 September – Nicolas Achten, musician
- 10 October – Dominique Cornu, cyclist
- 22 October – hadise, Turkish and Belgian singer
- 5 December
  - Mehdi Dehbi, actor and theatre director
  - Nico Verdonck, racing driver
- 22 December – Aurora Marion, actress

== Deaths ==
- 2 February – Lucien Cooremans (born 1899), politician
- 17 June – Pieter De Somer (born 1917), scientist
- 18 July – Louisa Ghijs (born 1902), actress
- 10 October – Alice Melin (born 1900), politician
- 29 October – Alice Roberts (born 1906), actress
- 16 November – Léon Lampo (born 1923), athlete
- 9 December – François Morren (born 1899), athlete
- 15 December – Jean van den Bosch (born 1910), diplomat
