= 1987 in Belgium =

- Decades: 1960s; 1970s; 1980s; 1990s; 2000s
- See also: Other events of 1987; List of years in Belgium

Events in the year 1987 in Belgium.

== Incumbents ==
- Monarch: Baudouin
- Prime Minister: Wilfried Martens

== Events ==
- 6 March – Herald of Free Enterprise disaster off Zeebrugge
- 30 March – Nicole Van Goethem's A Greek Tragedy wins Academy Award for Best Animated Short Film at the 59th Academy Awards
- 1 September – Royal order prohibiting smoking in roofed public spaces comes into force.
- 21 October – Government falls over Voeren crisis
- 13 December – 1987 Belgian general election

== Publications ==
- Geert Bekaert, Landschap van kerken: 10 eeuwen bouwen in Vlaanderen (Leuven, Davidsfonds), with photographs by Lieve Blancquaert
- Bettie Vanhoudt, Éléments de Description du Leke: Langue Bantoue de Zone C (Tervuren, Royal Museum for Central Africa)

== Births ==
- 13 April - Steven De Vuyst, politician
- 24 May – Déborah François, actress
- 23 July – Julien Ribaudo, politician

== Deaths ==
- 16 July – Pierre Lardinois (born 1924), politician
