= 1982 in Belgium =

- Decades: 1960s; 1970s; 1980s; 1990s; 2000s
- See also: Other events of 1982; List of years in Belgium

Events in the year 1982 in Belgium.

== Incumbents ==
- Monarch: Baudouin
- Prime Minister: Wilfried Martens

== Events ==
- 8 May – Gilles Villeneuve dies in a crash at Circuit Zolder qualifying for the 1982 Belgian Grand Prix
- 30 September – Brabant killers shoot and kill a policeman while robbing a gun dealer in Wavre
- 10 October – Municipal elections

== Publications ==
- OECD, Economic Surveys, 1981–1982: Belgium, Luxembourg.
- H. Lemaitre, Les gouvernements belges de 1968 à 1980: processus de crise (Stavelot, J. Chauveheid)

== Births ==
- 2 January – Hassan Mourhit, athlete
- 4 January – Mélanie Cohl, singer
- 26 February – Rose Berryl, writer
- 15 April – Marie Kremer, actress
- 30 April – Pascaline Crêvecoeur, actress
- 1 June – Justine Henin, tennis player
- 24 July – Élise Crombez, model
- 28 July – Jonas Geirnaert, cartoonist
- 6 August – Kevin van der Perren, figure skater
- 31 August – Thomas van den Balck, hockey player
- 18 September – Maxime Luycx, hockey player
- 26 September – Axel Hirsoux, singer
- 4 October – Lola Danhaive, hockey player
- 9 October – Laurent Micheli, director
- 7 November – Mahinur Ozdemir, politician
- 9 December – Nathalie De Vos, athlete
- 10 December - Mélanie Martins, singer
- 17 December – Virginie Claes, beauty queen

== Deaths ==
- 5 February – Wies Moens (born 1898), activist
- 2 April – Max de Vaucorbeil (born 1901), film director
- 7 April – Frédéric Bremer (born 1892), neurophysiologist
- 14 May – Marcel-Henri Jaspar (born 1901), politician
- 8 August – Ferre Grignard (born 1939), singer
- 10 August – Sim Viva (born 1903), singer and actress
- 17 August – Camille Bulcke (born 1909), missionary
- 9 October – Omer Becu (born 1902), trade unionist
- 18 October – Maurice Gilliams (born 1900), writer
- 4 November – Mireille Versele (born 1956), cystic fibrosis campaigner
- 25 November – Léon Vleurinck (born 1899), rower
- 3 December – Gaston Mesmaekers (born 1888), equestrian
