= Lesley-Ann Poppe =

Belgian model

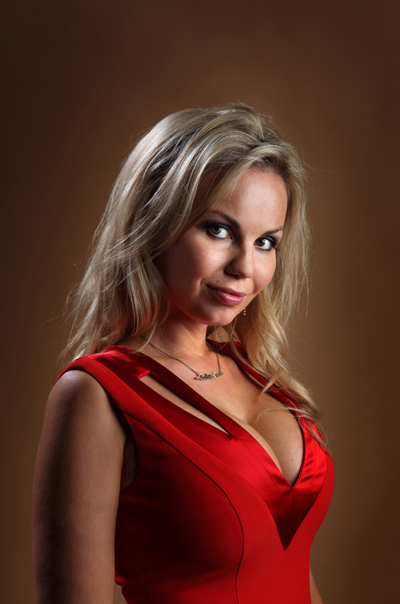
- Poppe in 2012
- Born: 7 March 1979 (age 47); Antwerp, Belgium
- Occupations: Model; television personality; Performing musician
- Years active: 1993–present
- Musical career
- Genres: Black metal; thrash metal; hardcore punk
- Instruments: Vocals; keyboards

Lesley-Ann Poppe (born 7 March 1979) is a Belgian model, television personality and musician.

Poppe was born in Antwerp located in northern Belgium on 7 March 1979. In the 1990s Poppe was a founding member of the Belgian black metal group Opus Nocturnales and later a member of Ecliptica. In 2008 she was awarded Miss Globe Belgium. And quickly began modeling for numerous agencies in Belgium, France, the United Kingdom and the Netherlands. Most notably for P-Magazine and Playboy. She was one of six models featured in Playboy's March 2012 issue "Finally completely naked" issue was sold out in Belgium in less than a week and was circulated 1.2 million times worldwide. In 2014 she began presenting the VTM program Beat da Bompaz and in 2016 and 2017 she was a guest twice in the parody program Tegen de Sterren op.

In 2011 Poppe published her first book Handboek voor Blondines, a handbook for models which was published by Standaard Uitgeverij. The next year she published a second book titled Beauty Food which detailed the connection between food, appearance and beauty. Later that year in August 2012 Poppe recorded a cooking show with Pamela Anderson.

She established a popular health and beauty line as well as a runs a Beauty Academy.
