= Noor (Meuse) =

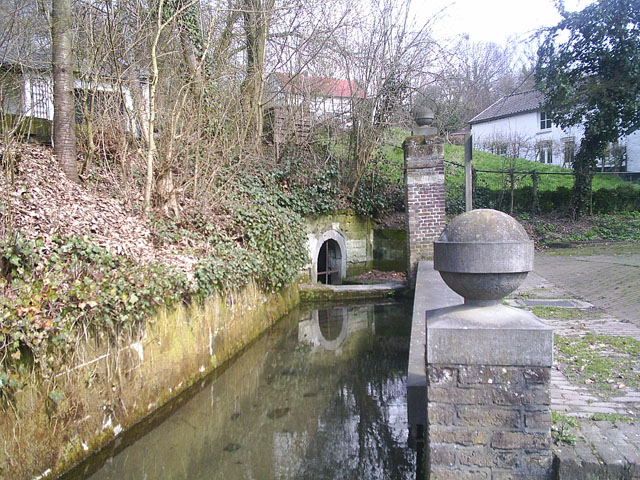
- Source of the river Noor at Wesch

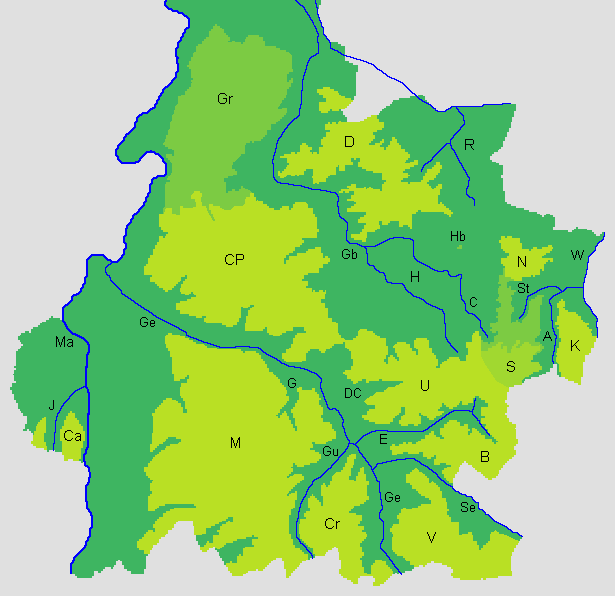
- Map of South Limburg. The Noor valley is the lower dark green area below the M.

Location
- Country: Netherlands, Belgium

Physical characteristics
- Source
  - location: Wesch, near Noorbeek
- Mouth
  - location: Voer near Voeren
  - coordinates: 50°45′49″N 5°47′37″E

Basin features
- Progression: Voer→ Meuse→ North Sea

The Noor or Langwater (Limburgish: Laankwater) is a river in the Netherlands and Belgium. The Noor is a right-bank tributary to the river Voer, which later joins the Meuse. Rising in Eijsden-Margraten, in the Dutch province of Limburg, the Noor eventually drains in the river Voer in Voeren, in the Belgian province of Limburg.

A source of the Noor can be found at the Brigida spring (Dutch: Sint Brigidabron) in the hamlet of Wesch, north of the village of Noorbeek, in the municipality of Eijsden-Margraten, where water wells up from the chalk underground. The spring and the adjacent 18th century lavoir, named after Brigid of Kildare, patron saint of the village of Noorbeek, form a Dutch national heritage site. From Wesch the river flows south, passing west of the village of Noorbeek (Dutch: Noor river), which was named after the river. Passing Noorbeek the Noor continues southward through the Noor valley, south of the plateau of Margraten, and is one of only few Dutch rivers to flow southward into Belgium. The Dutch part of the Noor valley (Dutch: Noordal) contains a nature reserve, with the same name, managed by the Dutch Society for preservation of Nature Monuments.

After crossing the border into Belgium the Noor flows past Castle Altenbroek and the Watermill at Altenbroek in Voeren. This 18th century castle is a Flemish heritage site. The Belgian part of the Noor valley is a Flemish protected landscape as part of the larger Voer valley protected landscape. The Noor eventually drains in the river Voer near the village of 's-Gravenvoeren in the municipality of Voeren.

== Gallery ==
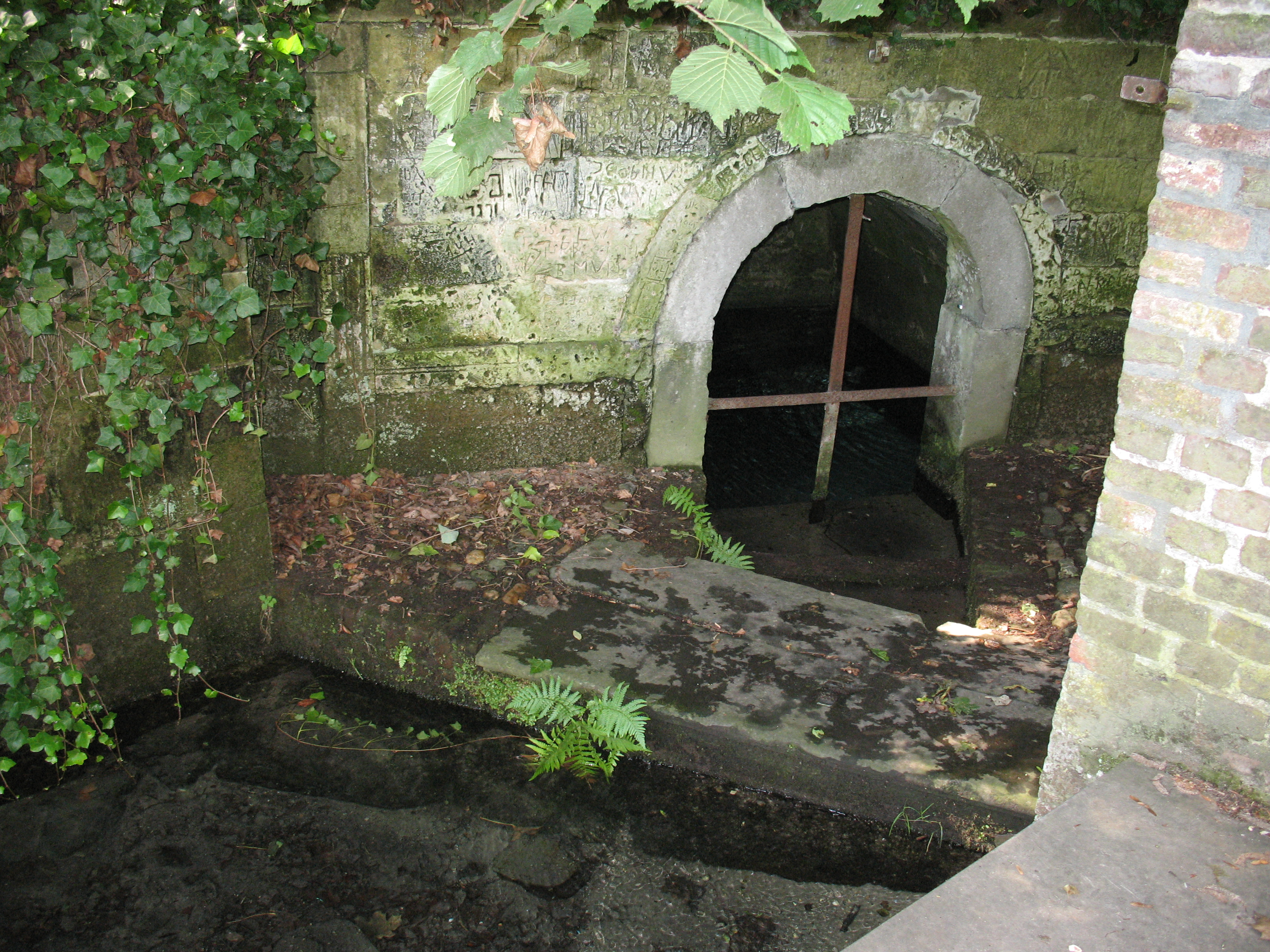
A source of the Noor at Wesch

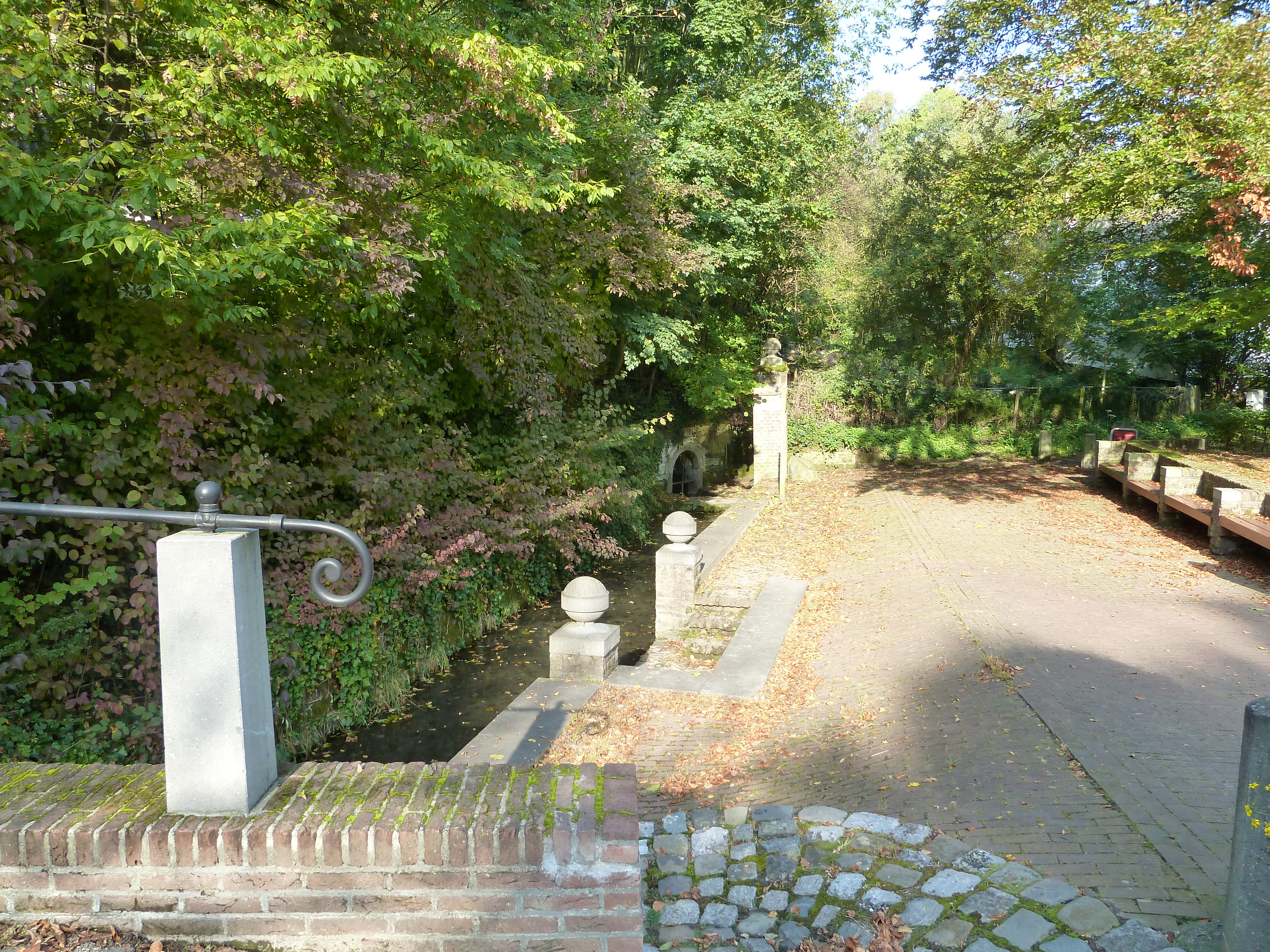
Monumental 18th century lavoir at Wesch

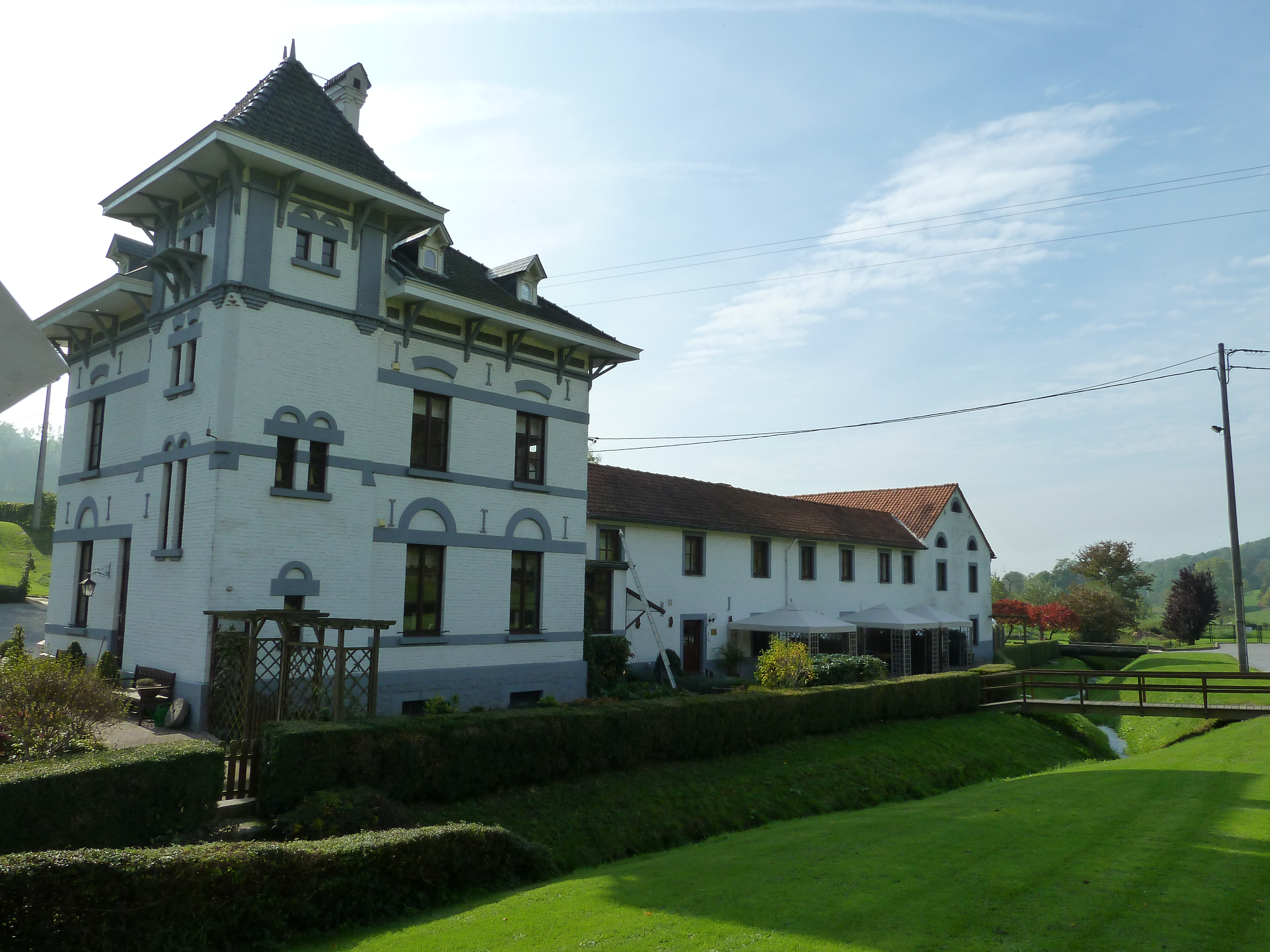
Watermill at Altenbroek

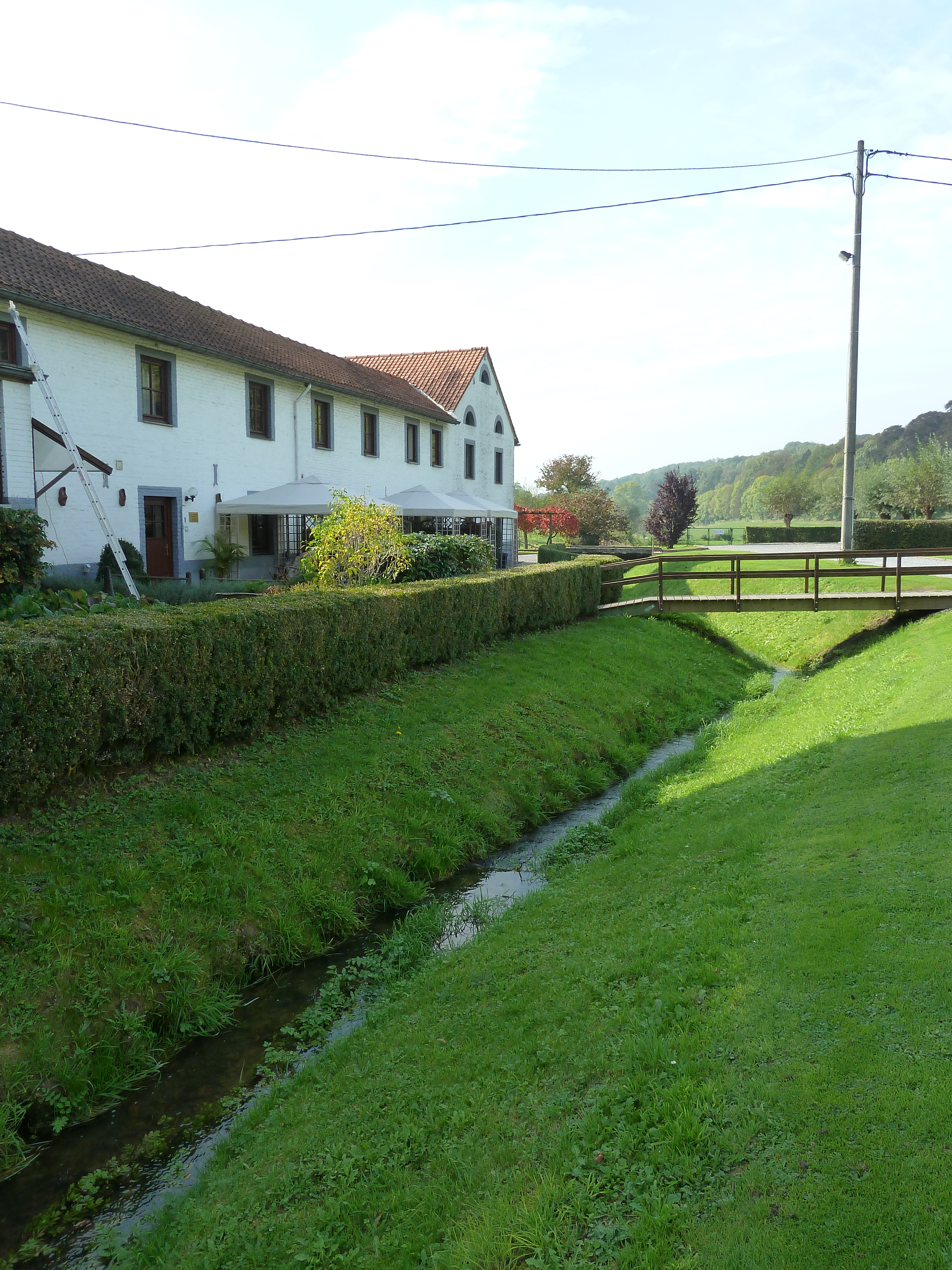
The Noor passing the watermill at Altenbroek

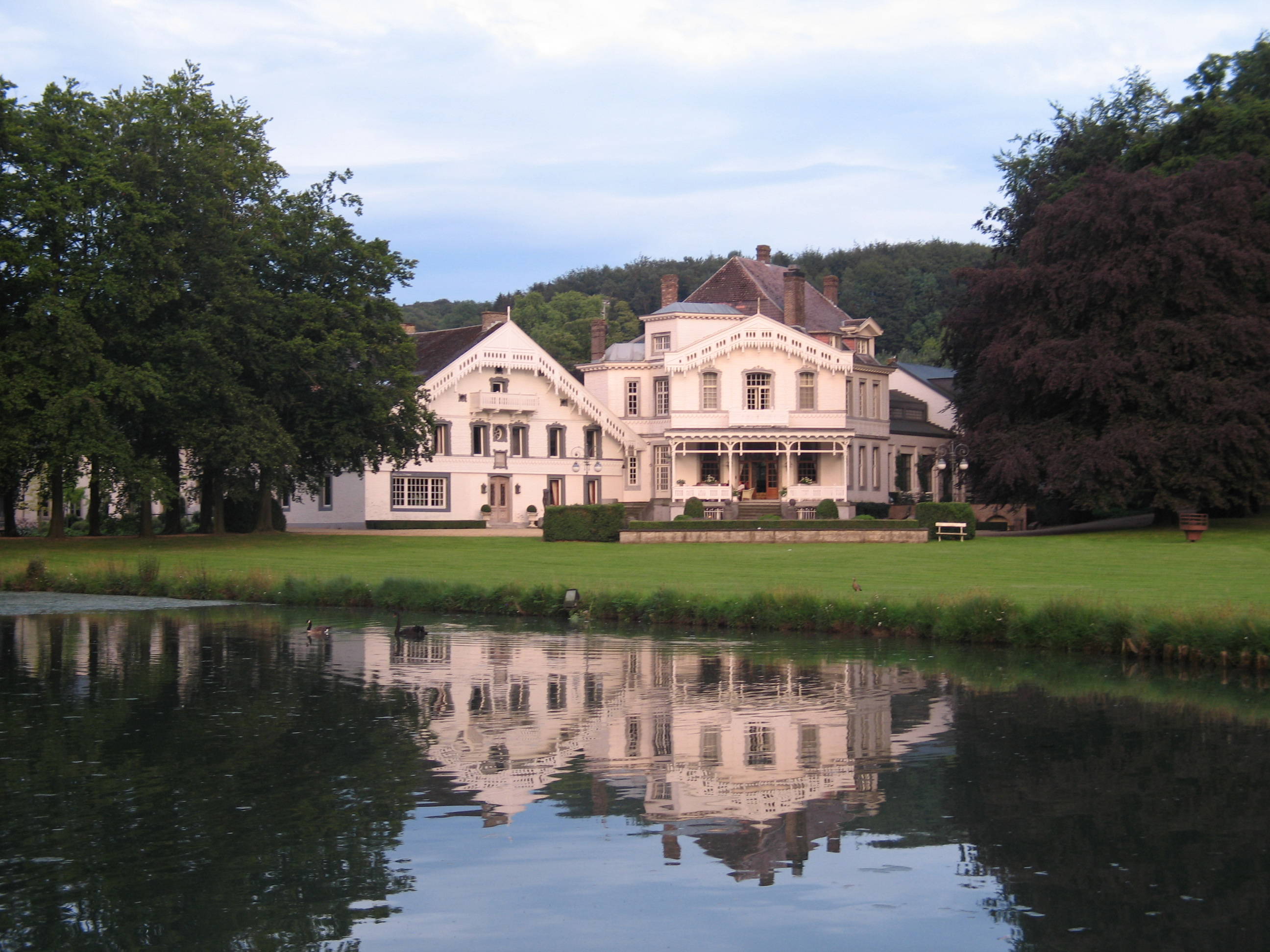
The Noor at Castle Altenbroek
