= Chiarelli =

Chiarelli (Italian: [kjaˈrɛlli]) is an Italian surname. Notable people with the surname include:

- Bernard Chiarelli (1934–2024), French footballer
- Bob Chiarelli (born 1941), Canadian politician
- Charly Chiarelli (born 1948), Canadian writer
- Geno Chiarelli (born 1994), American politician
- Gina Chiarelli, Canadian actress
- Luigi Chiarelli (1880–1947), Italian playwright, theatre critic, and writer of short stories
- Peter Chiarelli (disambiguation), two or more people
- Raffaele Chiarelli (born 1990), Belgian footballer
- Rick Chiarelli (born c. 1964), Canadian politician
- Rita Chiarelli, Canadian singer
- Rob Chiarelli (born 1963), American record producer
- Talia Chiarelli (born 1995), Canadian gymnast
