= Huub Broers =

Belgian politician

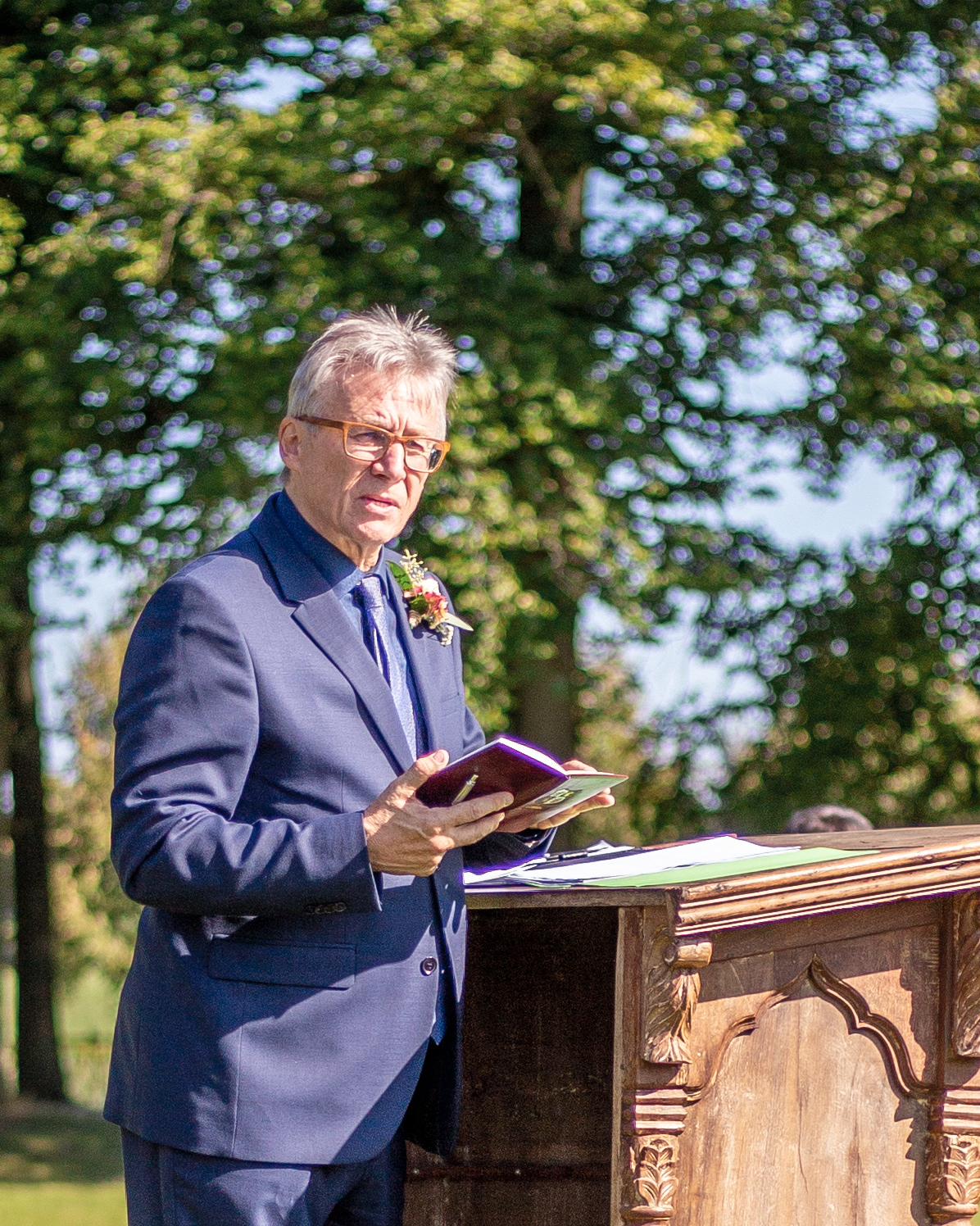

Senator
- Incumbent
- Assumed office 20 July 2010

Personal details
- Born: 5 December 1951 (age 74) Voeren, Limburg
- Party: N-VA

Huub Broers (born 5 December 1951 in Voeren) is a Belgian politician and was until 2020 elected by the ruling Voerbelangen party as mayor of Voeren. He represented CD&V until 14 July 2010, thereafter, he became affiliated to the New Flemish Alliance. He was co-opted as a member of the Belgian Senate on that day.
