= Gunk =

Gunk may refer to:

- Gunge, or gunk, an unspecific greasy, filthy substance
- Gunk (mereology), the term in mereology for any whole whose parts all have further proper parts
- Gunk, a Belgian television program and monthly magazine
- Gunk, a line of automotive maintenance products produced by the Radiator Specialty Company
- Shawangunk Ridge, often referred to as "the Gunks"
- Gunk, a character in the comic strip Curtis

== See also ==
- Gunkholing, a boating term referring to a type of cruising in shallow or shoal water
- The Gunk, a 2021 video game
