= De Caluwé =

De Caluwé, or Decaluwé, is a surname. Notable people with the name include:

== People ==
- Carl Decaluwé (born 1960), Belgian politician
- Edgard De Caluwé (1913–1985), Belgian cyclist
- Ingrid de Caluwé (1967-), Dutch politician
- Jackie De Caluwé (1934–2021), Belgian footballer
- Katleen De Caluwé (1976-), Belgian sprinter
- Robby De Caluwé (1975-), Belgian politician
- Sylvie De Caluwé (1986-), Belgian model

== See also ==
- Tom Caluwé (1978-), Belgian footballer
