= 1983 in Belgium =

- Decades: 1960s; 1970s; 1980s; 1990s; 2000s
- See also: Other events of 1983; List of years in Belgium

Events in the year 1983 in Belgium.

== Incumbents ==
- Monarch: Baudouin
- Prime Minister: Wilfried Martens

== Events ==
- 1 January – In the Flemish municipality of Voeren (Belgium), the controversial French-speaking José Happart is installed as mayor. However, Mayor Happart refuses to learn Dutch, which is contrary to the Belgian Constitution.
- 1 April – Master scammer William Vandergucht withdraws 76 million Belgian francs from an ASLK bank branch in Ghent with a bad check and disappears without a trace.
- 17 May –The first scratchcard is introduced in Belgium: Presto from the National Lottery.
- 23 October – A very large peace demonstration is taking place in Brussels (from Brussels South towards Brussels North) against the installation of NATO cruise missiles on Belgian territory with around 400,000 demonstrators according to the organizers (120,000 according to the police).

== Publications ==
- Hugo Claus, Het verdriet van België
- Francis Delpérée, Chroniques de crise, 1977-1982 (Brussels, C.R.I.S.P.)
- Ernest Vandevyvere, De watervoorziening te Brugge van de 13e tot de 20e eeuw (Bruges)
- I. Verbeeck, Functionele analyse van de sleepdiensten in de haven van Antwerpen (Antwerp)

== Art and architecture ==
Cinematic releases

- Brussels by Night, directed by Marc Didden

== Births ==
- 25 January – Astrid Coppens, performer
- 31 January – Tom Vangeneugden, Olympic swimmer
- 26 February – Andrei Lugovski, Belarusian-born tenor
- 12 March – Sigrid Persoon, gymnast
- 11 May – Frédéric Xhonneux, athlete
- 2 June – Jo Deman, scouting executive
- 12 September – Niels Tas, politician
- 16 September – Katerine Avgoustakis, singer
- 6 October – Nina van Koeckhoven, athlete
- 25 October – Nawell Madani, media figure
- 26 December – Jeroen Soete, politician

== Deaths ==
- 3 March- Hergé,(born 1907)comics author
- 15 March – Albert-Émile de Beauffort (born 1899), colonial administrator
- 11 July – Paul Harsin (born 1902), historian
- 25 September – Leopold III (born 1901)
