= List of members of the Council of the German-speaking Community, 1986–1990 =

This is a list of members of the Council of the German Cultural Community between 1986 and 1990, following the direct elections of 1986.

== Composition ==
Party	Seats	+/–
Christian Social Party (Christlich Soziale Partei, CSP)	10	▲1
Party of German-speaking Belgians (Partei der Deutschsprachigen Belgier, PDB)	5	▼2
Party for Freedom and Progress (Partei für Freiheit und Fortschritt, PFF)	5	▼1
Parti Socialiste (Sozialistische Partei, SP)	3	0
Ecolo (ECOLO)	1	new
Solidarity and Participation (Solidarité et Participation, SEP)	1	new
	25	

== Sources ==
- "Members of the DG Parliament". The Parliament of the German-speaking Community. Archived from the original on 2012-04-15.
