= 1988 in Belgium =

- Decades: 1960s; 1970s; 1980s; 1990s; 2000s
- See also: Other events of 1988; List of years in Belgium

Events in the year 1988 in Belgium.

== Incumbents ==
- Monarch: Baudouin
- Prime Minister: Wilfried Martens

== Events ==
- 20 September – Margaret Thatcher gives a speech in Bruges, setting out her opposition to a Federal Europe.
- 9 October – Municipal elections

== Publications ==
- OECD, Economic Surveys, 1987/1988: Belgium, Luxembourg
- François Perin, Histoire d'une nation introuvable (Brussels, Legrain).

== Births ==
- 22 February – Kevin Borlée, sprinter
- 6 March – Simon Mignolet, footballer
- 17 March – Brent Meuleman, politician
- 30 September - Natalie Eggermont, politician
- 8 October – Hanne Gaby Odiele, model
- 10 October – Jodie Devos, operatic soprano (d. 2024)

== Deaths ==
- 5 January – Jules-François Crahay (born 1917), fashion designer
- 8 January – Oscar Soetewey (born 1925), Olympic middle-distance runner (1952)
- 10 August – Jean Brachet (born 1909), chemist
- 28 October – Lucien Leboutte (born 1898), air chief
