= Peter Chiarelli =

Peter Chiarelli may refer to:

- Peter W. Chiarelli (born 1950), former Vice Chief of Staff of the U.S. Army
- Peter Chiarelli (ice hockey) (born 1964), ice hockey manager
- Peter Chiarelli (screenwriter), American screenwriter and film producer

== See also ==
- Chiarelli
