= 1989 in Belgium =

- Decades: 1960s; 1970s; 1980s; 1990s; 2000s
- See also: Other events of 1989; List of years in Belgium

Events in the year 1989 in Belgium.

== Incumbents ==
- Monarch: Baudouin
- Prime Minister: Wilfried Martens

== Events ==
- 18 June – Brussels-Capital Region comes into being
- 15 December – Paul Schruers becomes Bishop of Hasselt

== Deaths ==
- 24/25 December – Danny Huwé (born 1943), journalist
