= Noorbeek =

Noorbeek Norbik
- Village
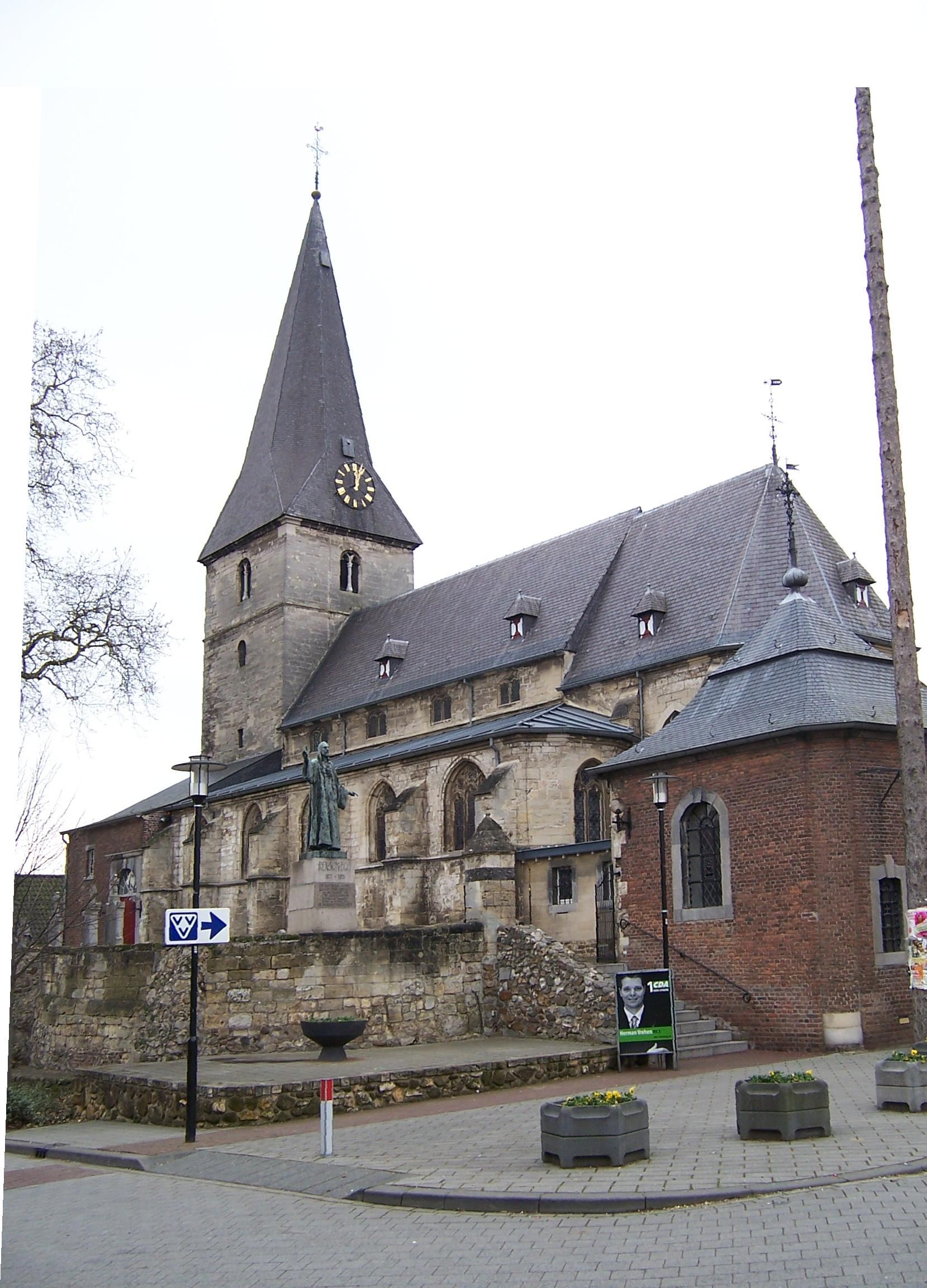

- Coat of arms

- Location in the Netherlands Location in the province of Limburg in the Netherlands
- Coordinates: 50°46′N 5°49′E
- Country: Netherlands
- Province: (Limburg (Netherlands)) Limburg
- Municipality: Eijsden-Margraten

Area
  - Total: 0.90 km^{2} (0.35 sq mi)
- Elevation: 139 m (456 ft)

Population (2021)
  - Total: 735
  - Density: 820/km^{2} (2,100/sq mi)
- Time zone: UTC+1 (CET)
  - Summer (DST): UTC+2 (CEST)
- Postal code: 6255
- Dialing code: 043

Noorbeek (Limburgish: Norbik, English: Noor brook) is a village in the Dutch province of Limburg. It is located in the municipality of Eijsden-Margraten (Limburgish: Megraote) and about 12 km southeast of Maastricht. Noorbeek is one of the southernmost villages of the Netherlands and was named after the nearby river Noor.

== History ==
Noorbeek developed in the 11th century on the plateau of Margraten near the source of the Noor river. It was part of the Land of Dalhem and a heerlijkheid until 1626.

The Catholic St Brigida Church is a three aisled church mainly constructed from chalk. The oldest parts date from around 1100. The tower was enlarged in the 16th century and received its current spire.

Noorbeek was home to 342 people in 1840. It was a separate municipality until 1982, when it was merged with Margraten. It is part of the Mergellandroute. In 2011, it became part of the municipality of Eijsden-Margraten.

== Gallery ==
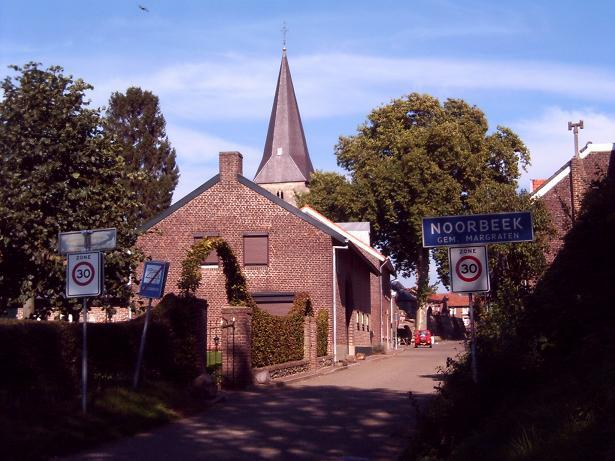
Welcome to Noorbeek

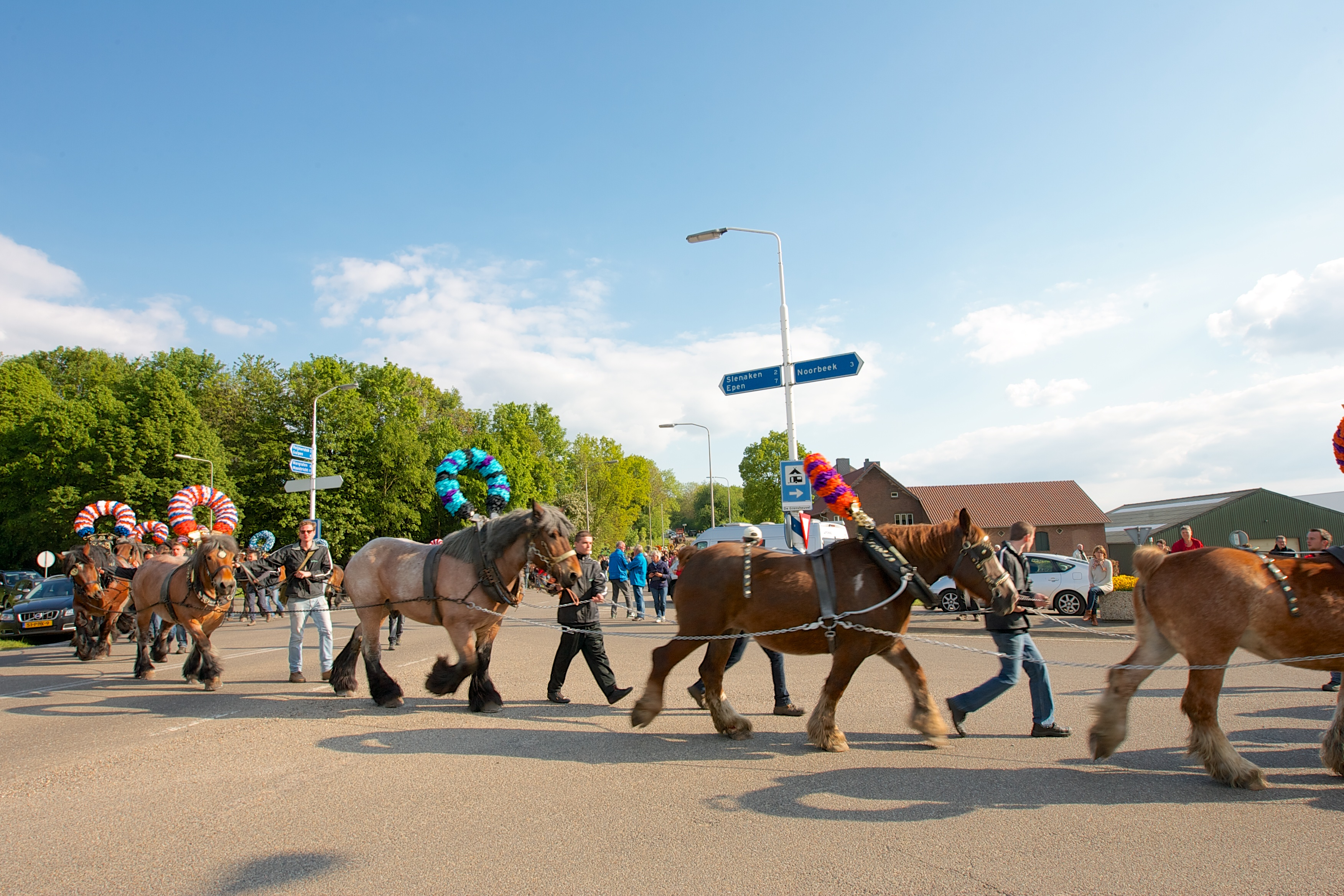
Bridida pine collection day

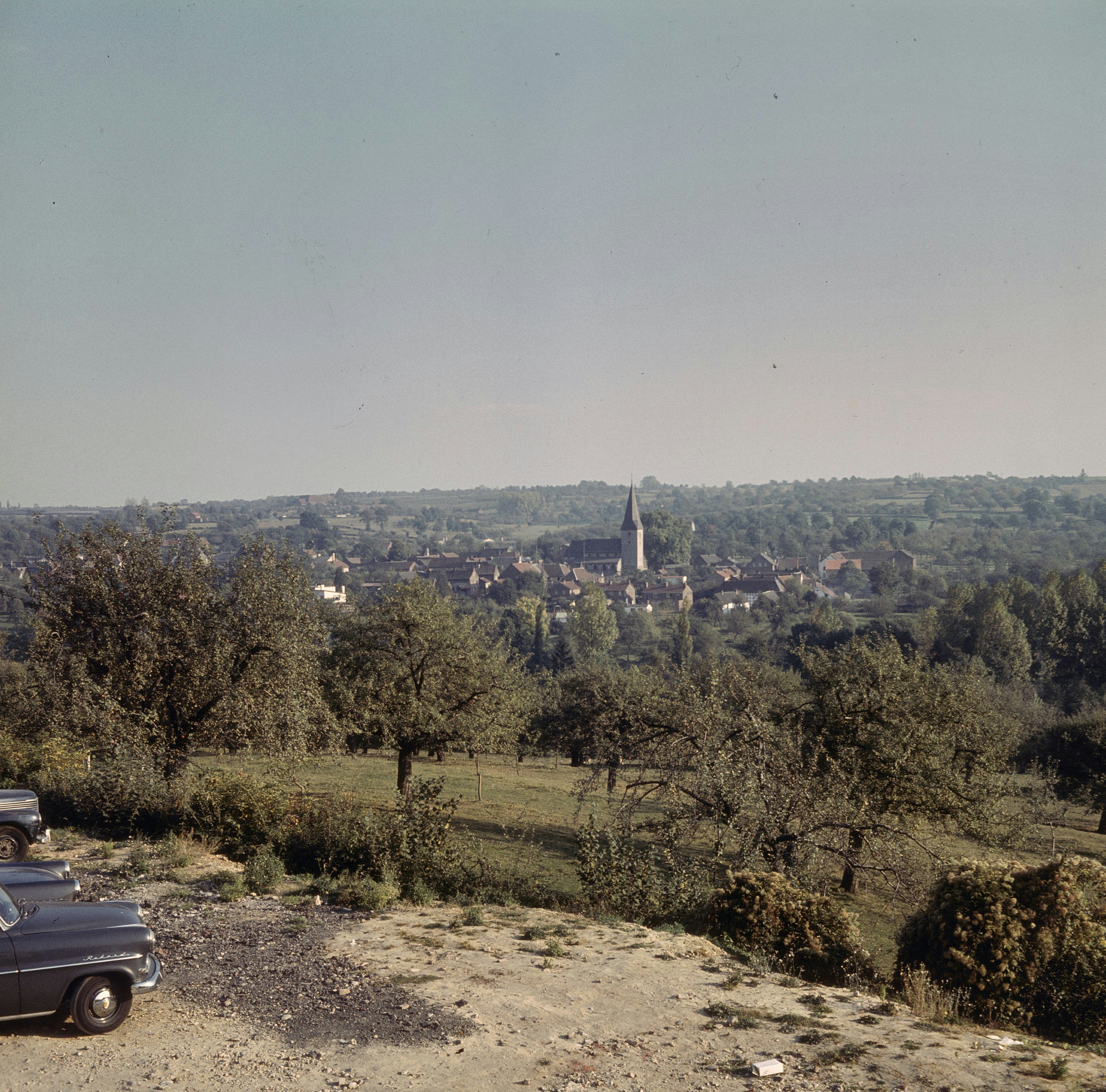
View on Noorbeek

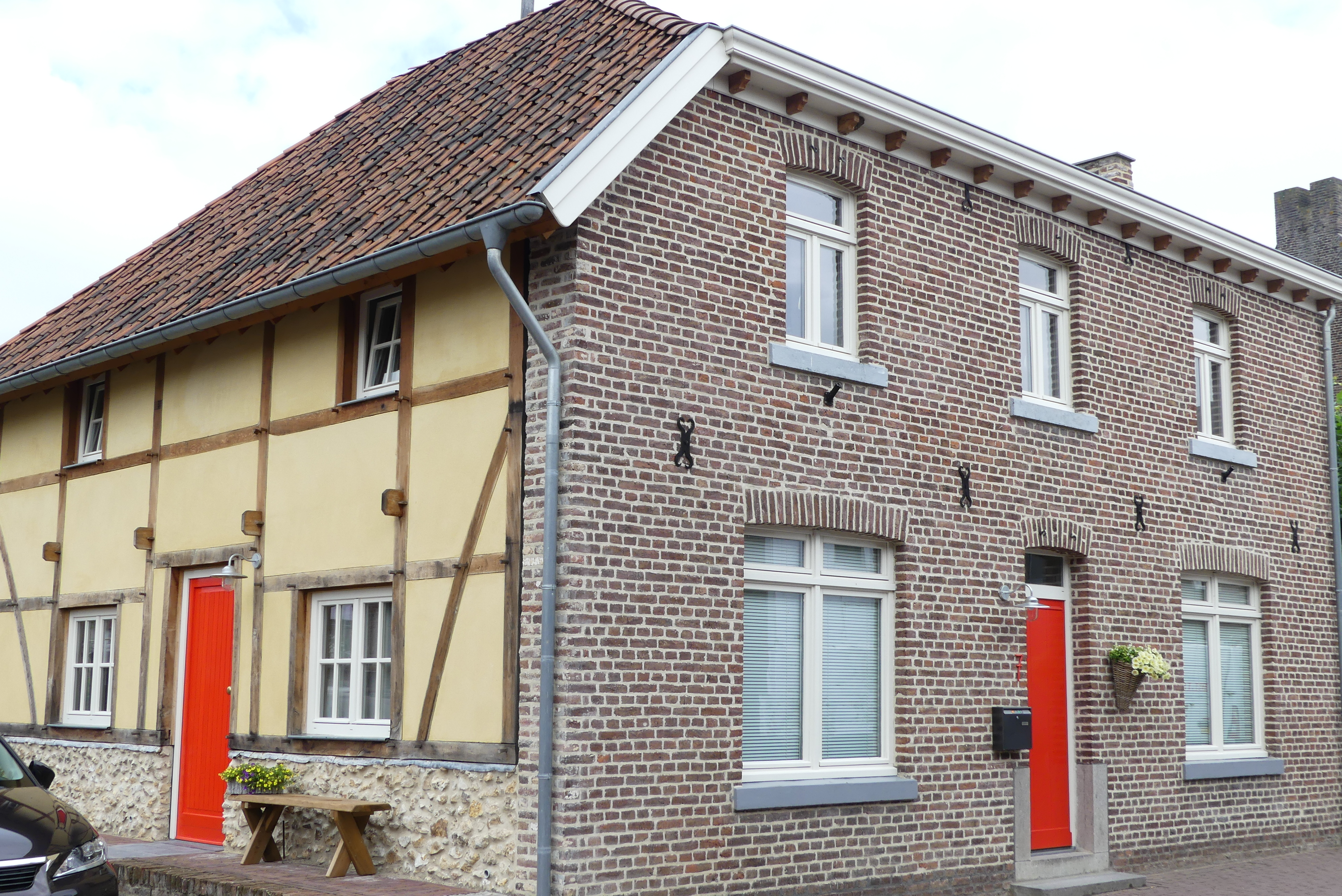
House in Noorbeek
