= 1984 in Belgium =

- Decades: 1960s; 1970s; 1980s; 1990s; 2000s
- See also: Other events of 1984; List of years in Belgium

Events in the year 1984 in Belgium.

== Incumbents ==
- Monarch: Baudouin
- Prime Minister: Wilfried Martens

== Events ==
- 2 to 17 October – Communist Combatant Cells carry out a series of attacks against American and German companies, the Paul Hymans Institute, and the Ghent offices of the Flemish Christian Democrats
- 15 December – Roger Vangheluwe appointed as Bishop of Bruges by Pope John Paul II.

== Publications ==
- Biographie Nationale de Belgique, vol. 42
- Jean Stengers and Anne Van Neck, Histoire d'une grande peur: la masturbation (Brussels, Editions de l'Université de Bruxelles)
- Jean-Émile Humblet, Jalons pour une histoire religieuse de la Wallonie (Brussels, Vie Ouvrière)
- C. Vandenbroeke, Vlaamse koopkracht: Gisteren, vandaag en morgen (Leuven, Kritak)
- Denis Whitaker, Tug of War: Allied Command and the story behind the Battle of the Scheldt (New York, Beaufort Books)

== Births ==
- 13 March – Steve Darcis, professional tennis player
- 12 April – Kevin Pauwels, cyclist
- 10 June – Dirk Van Tichelt, judoka
- 2 July – Maarten Martens, footballer
- 27 September – Wouter Weylandt, road bicycle racer (died 2011)
- 12 November – Sepp De Roover, footballer

== Deaths ==
- 22 January – Chaïm Perelman, philosopher (born 1912)
- 22 May – Laurent Grimmonprez, footballer (born 1902)
- 7 August – Ann Christy, singer
- 29 September – Marnix Gijsen, writer
- 1 December – Alphonse Schepers, cyclist (born 1907)
