= Voerbelangen =

Belgian political party

- Leader: Huub Broers
- Founded: 1976
- Ideology: Local politics
- Mayors: 1 / 327

Website
- Official website

Voerbelangen is a local political party from the Belgian municipality Voeren. The party has 10 seats of a total of 15 in the city council. Since 2001 is Huub Broers the mayor of Voeren.
