= Voer =

Voer Fouron
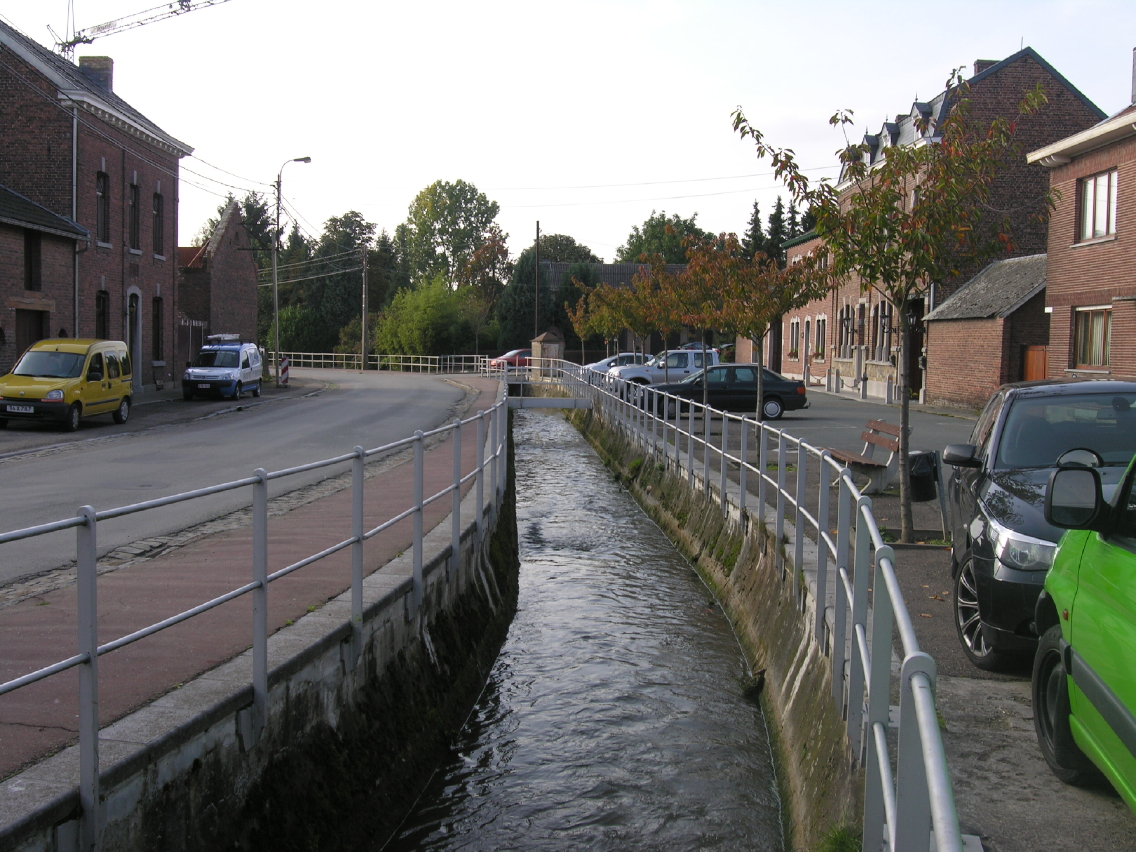
- The Voer in 's-Gravenvoeren

Location
- Country: Belgium, Netherlands

Physical characteristics
- Source
  - location: near Sint-Pieters-Voeren
  - coordinates: 50.7355°N 5.8238°E
- Mouth
  - location: Meuse in Eijsden
  - coordinates: 50.7735°N 5.6974°E
- Length: 12 km (7.5 mi)
- Basin size: 12 km^{2} (4.6 sq mi)
- Discharge
  - average: 1.32 m^{3}/s (47 cu ft/s)

Basin features
- Progression: Meuse→ North Sea

The Voer (Dutch, pronounced [vuːr]; French: Fouron) is a small river in Belgium and the Netherlands. It is a right-bank tributary to the river Meuse. It has three (creek-) tributaries of its own: the Veurs, the Noor and the Beek.

The source of the Voer is near the village of Sint-Pieters-Voeren in the Belgian province of Limburg. The river crosses the Belgian-Dutch border between 's-Gravenvoeren and Mesch, and flows into the river Meuse at Eijsden. The Voer's total length is about 12 kilometres (7.5 mi). It lends its name to the Voeren municipality as well as to the villages 's-Gravenvoeren, Sint-Pieters-Voeren and Sint-Martens-Voeren through which it passes.

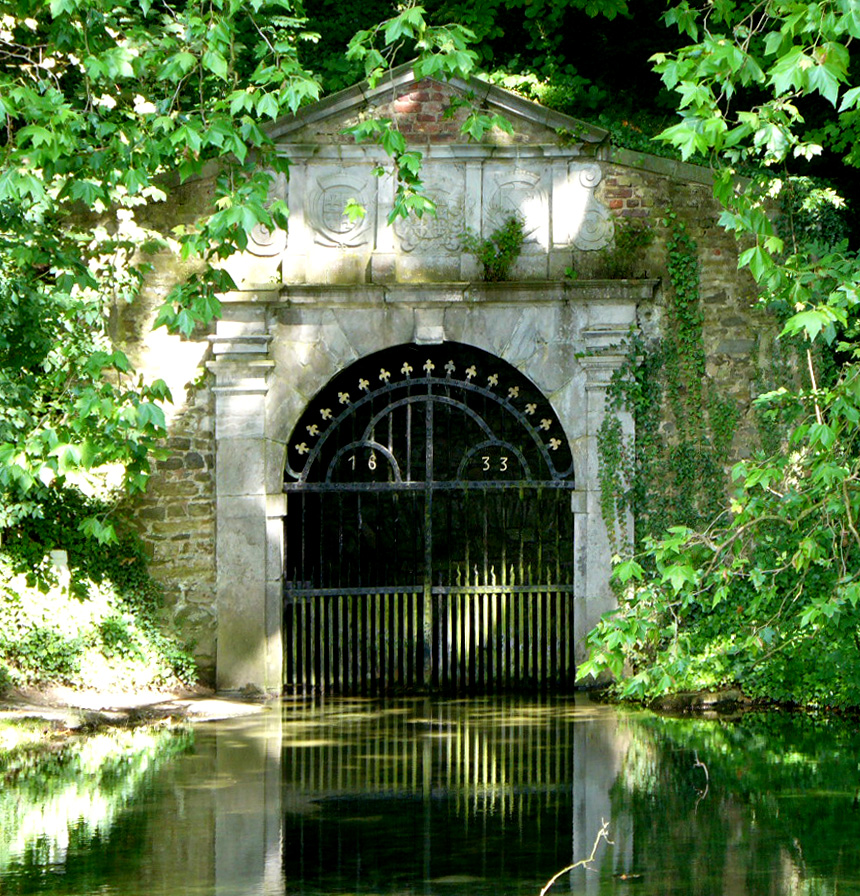
Source (-building) of the Voer at Sint-Pieters-Voeren

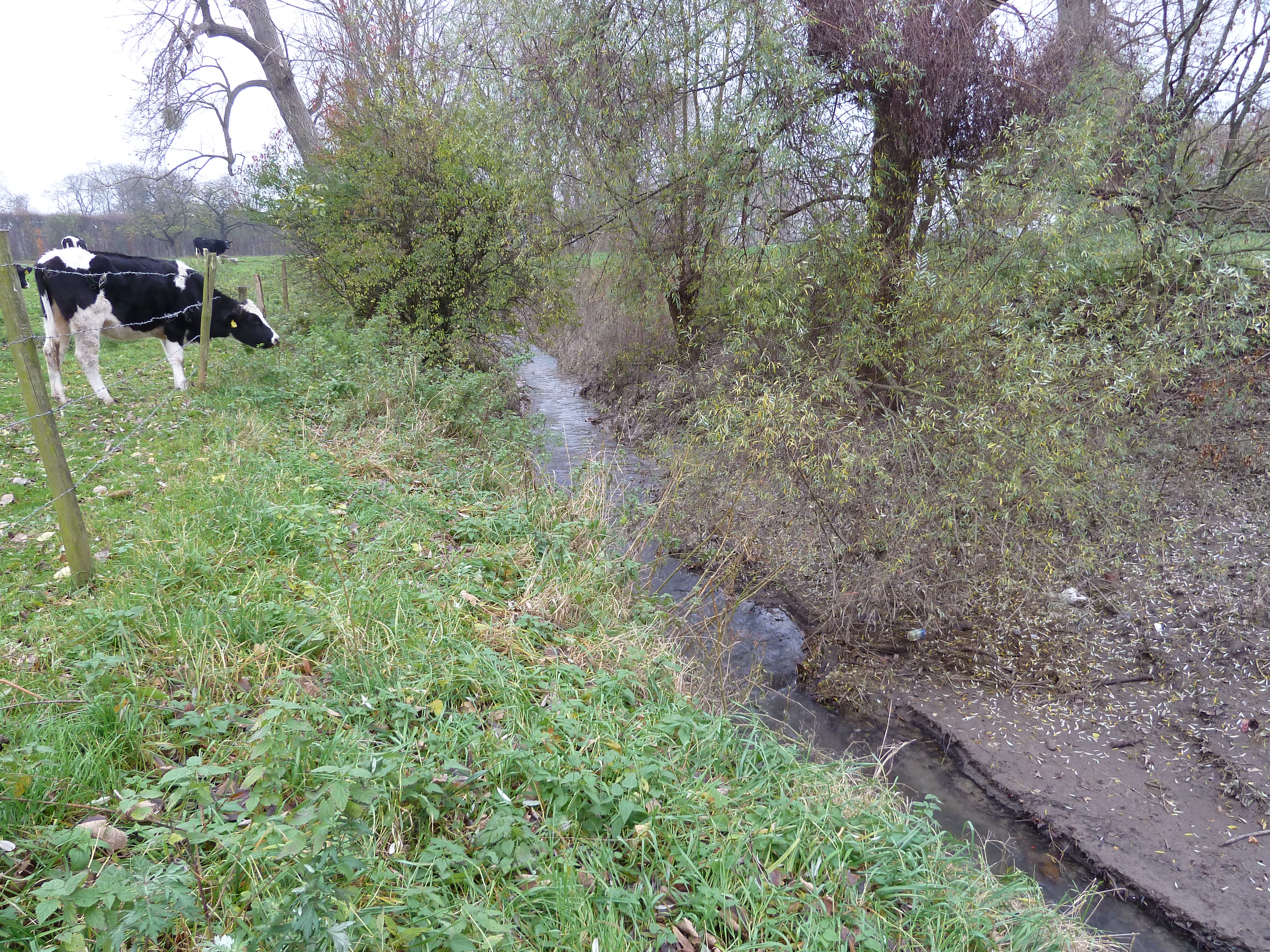
The Voer at Eijsden quite near to its estuary in the Meuse.

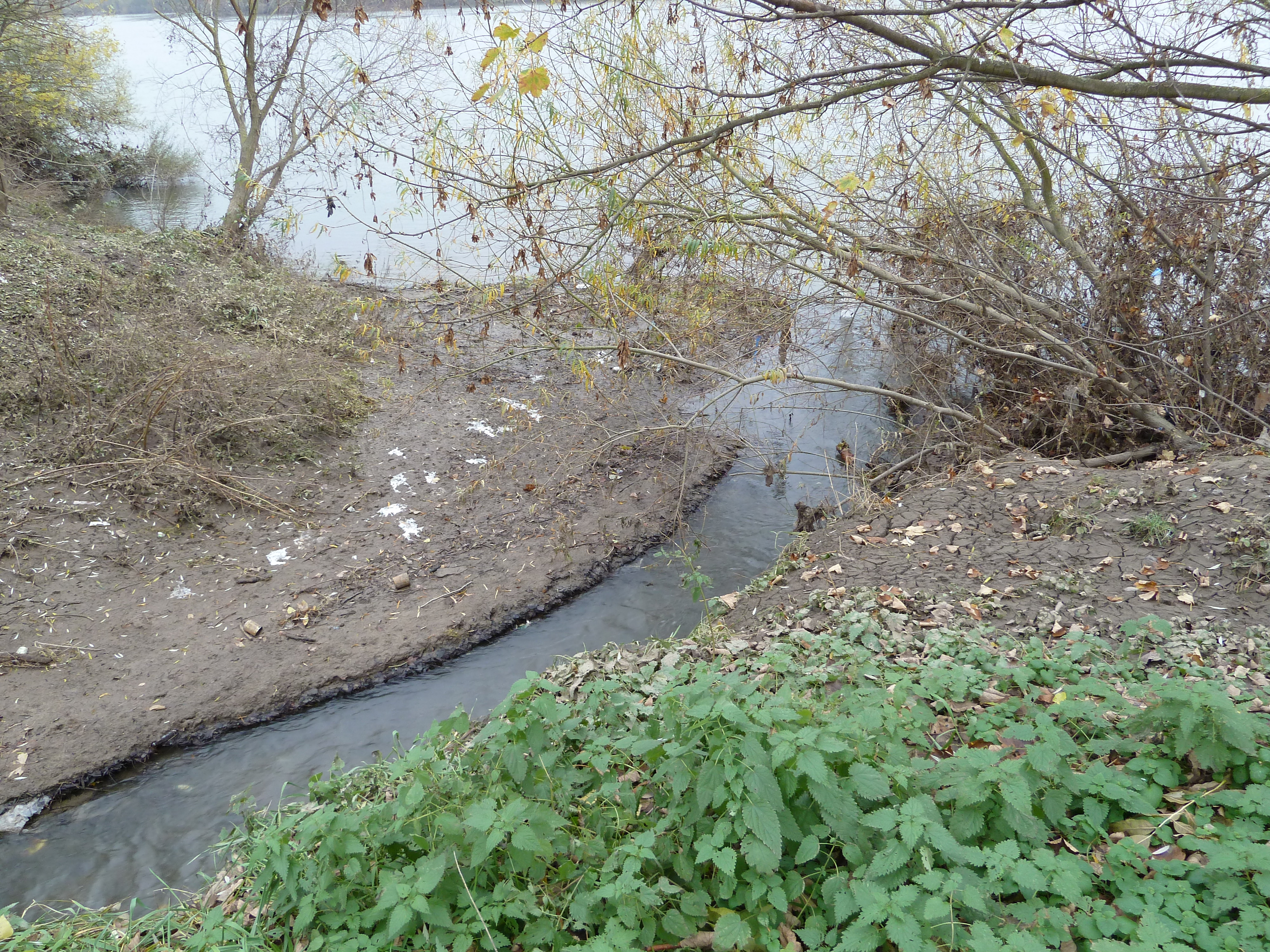
Estuary of the Voer at Eijsden.
