= Wim De Craene =

Flemish Belgian singer

- De Craene in 1988
- Born: Willem Marcel de Craene; 30 July 1950; Ghent, Belgium
- Died: 14 September 1990 (aged 40); Ghent, Belgium
- Occupation: singer
- Website: http://www.wimdecraene.net/

Willem Marcel (Wim) De Craene (30 July 1950 – 14 September 1990) was a Flemish Belgian singer. His most famous songs were 'Rozane' (1975), 'Tim' (1975) and 'Breek uit jezelf' (1987).

== Career ==
Born in Ghent in 1950, Belgian cabaret singer Wim de Craene began his career performing in the Flemish folk band Ja before he was taken under the wing of Miel Cools in the early '70s, going on to score hits with "Rozane," "Breek Uit Jezelf," and "Tim." After writing his first musical, Help, Ik Win Een Miljoen, and twice entering his homeland's Eurovision pre-selection contest, he began to incorporate pop, rock, disco, and new wave into his sound with diminishing success. Two years after releasing his final album, Via Dolorosa, he committed suicide with an overdose of anti-depressants; however, his music has since gained more recognition after his death.

== Honours and awards ==
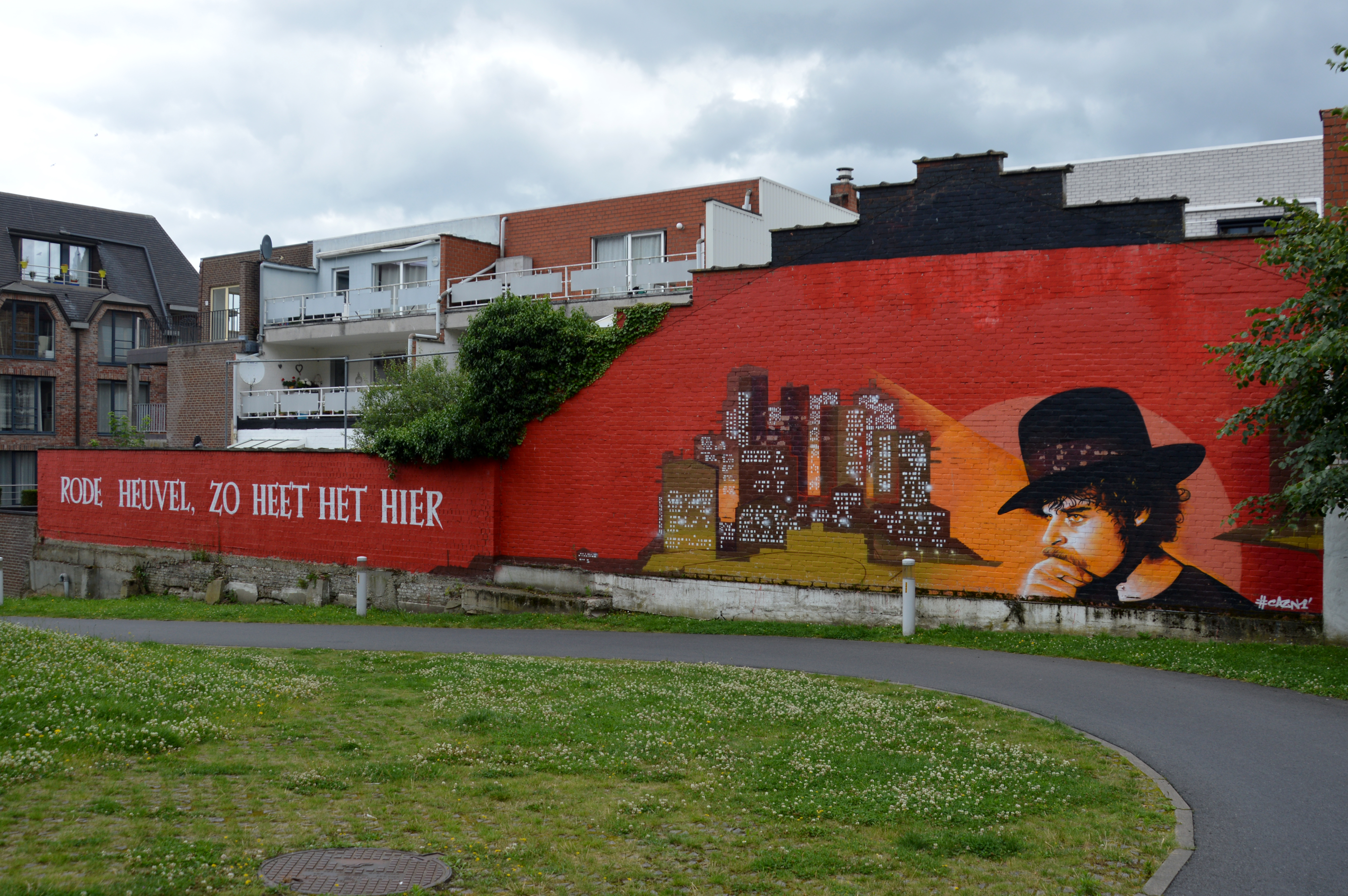
Mural "Rode Heuvel zo heet het hier", featuring Wim De Craene, by Cazn, Wetteren

- Golden Award: 2010
- Rode Heuvel square in Wetteren, after a song: 2017
- Rozanetuin garden in Ghent (referring to his song Rozane): 2022
- Mural in Wetteren: 2022
- Golden Lifetime Awards: 2022
- Different tribute-tours by Flemish artists

== Discography ==
=== Studio albums ===
- Wim De Craene (1973)
- Brussel (1975)
- Alles is nog bij het oude (1975)
- ... Is ook nooit weg (1977)
- Perte Totale (1980)
- Kraaknet (1983)
- Via Dolorosa (1988)

These seven albums were reissued in the eight-CD box set Integraal (2015), alongside single releases, previously unreleased recordings and other material.

=== Collaborative albums ===
- Pas Op! (1982), with Raymond Bosschaerts, Viona Westra, Katrien De Vos and Rik Wolf
- Een vinger in de pap (1982), with Viona Westra

=== Live albums ===
- Live 78 (2020), recorded in 1978

=== Singles ===
Year	A-side	B-side
1970	"Recht naar de kroegen en de wijven"	"Revolutie nummer 2"
1971	"Rozerood-Oranje"	"Portret van gisteren"
1974	"De kleine man"	"Tante Emma"
1975	"Rozane"	"Sara"
1976	"Marcellino"	"Stad"
1978	"Help! Ik win een miljoen" (with Mia Grijp)	"Flatlied"
1980	"St. Tropez"	"Rollen"
1980	"Ravage"	"Zonder benzine"
1982	"Ik kan geen kikker van de kant afduwen" (with Perte Totale)	"Ik kan geen kikker van de kant afduwen" (instrumental)
1982	"Jamboree on 45, Part 1" (with Perte Totale)	"Jamboree on 45, Part 2"
1982	"Hoor"	"Bwana Kitoko"
1983	"Het exuberante leven van Leentje De Vries"	"Het exuberante leven van Leentje De Vries" (instrumental with choir)
1983	"Kristien"	"Matilda"
1983	"Rikky"	"An en Jan"
1983	"Laat me met je meegaan"	"Kraaknet"
1987	"Breek uit jezelf"	"Levenslang"
1988	"Vrijwillig"	"Desperado"
1989	"Onderweg naar Kerstmis"	"Onderweg naar Kerstmis" (instrumental)
1990	"(Alleen = maar alleen) Leen"	"Gaudi 1992" (instrumental)
1990	"Enkel in een broekje"	"Enkel in een broekje" (Ambiance version)

=== Posthumous singles ===
Year	A-side / lead track	B-side / additional track
1997	"Winter in Brussel"	"Hoger Hoger"
1999	"Enkel in een broekje '99"	"Enkel in een broekje" (1990 version)
2019	"Tim"	"Rozane"

Although "Tim" first appeared on the 1975 album Alles is nog bij het oude, it was not released as a vinyl single until 14 September 2019.

=== EPs ===
- Help! Ik win een miljoen (1977), a four-track EP featuring music from the children's musical, performed with Jan De Vuyst, Mia Grijp and other artists

=== Selected compilation albums ===
- The World of Wim De Craene (1979)
- Het beste van Wim De Craene (1982)
- Het beste van... Wim De Craene (1990)
- Dag Wim... Alles is nog bij het oude (1996)
- Integraal (2015), eight-CD box set containing all seven original studio albums, singles, rarities and previously unreleased material
- Vlaamse Klassiekers – 40 Hits (2020)
