= Michaël Van Geele =

Belgian footballer

Personal information
- Full name: Michaël Van Geele
- Date of birth: 1 August 1986 (age 40)
- Place of birth: Brussels, Belgium
- Height: 1.85 m (6 ft 1 in)
- Position: Midfielder

Team information
- Current team: KSV Bornem

Youth career
- KV Mechelen
- Middlesbrough

Senior career*
Years	Team	Apps	(Gls)
2004–2005	Union Saint-Gilloise	14	(2)
2005–2007	Verbroedering Geel	24	(1)
2007–2010	Waasland-Beveren	101	(9)
2010–2011	FC Brussels	25	(1)
2011	Royal Antwerp	6	(0)
2011–2014	FC Eindhoven	49	(0)
2014–	KSV Bornem	0	(0)
- * Club domestic league appearances and goals as of 27 June 2014 (UTC)

Michaël Van Geele (born 1 August 1986) is a Belgian professional footballer who currently plays as a midfielder for Belgian side KSV Bornem. He formerly played for Union Saint-Gilloise, Verbroedering Geel, Waasland-Beveren, FC Brussels, Royal Antwerp and FC Eindhoven.
