= Alice Melin =

Belgian politician (1900–1985)

Alice Melin (9 August 1900 – 10 October 1985) was a Belgian socialist politician.

The daughter of Henri Melin and Géraldine Danse, she was born in Ampsin. After attending public school, she took night courses in accounting, shorthand typing and languages, as well as courses given by Isabelle Blume and Alice Pels. An active socialist, she worked in the office of cooperatives in Amay and Liège. She received a diploma in social work from the Ecole ouvriere superieure in Brussels. From 1926, she taught in a vocational school founded by the Belgian Labour Party in Liège.

From 1928 to 1965, she was secretary for the Femmes prévoyantes socialistes (FPS). She served on the national executive council for the FPS and was also a member of various other women's organizations. From 1928, she helped organize summer camps for the FPS. During the Spanish Civil War, she provided aid to Spanish children taking refuge in Belgium. During World War II, she helped raise funds for the underground socialist movement in Liège Province.

From 1954 to 1958, she was a senator for Liège Province; from 1958 to 1961, she represented the Arrondissement of Liège in the senate. During her time in the senate, she worked for equal treatment for women.

She was married twice: first to a Mr. Bruylandt who died in 1924 and later to Urbain Guilmain.

Melin died in Huldenberg at the age of 85.
