= Gunk (media) =

Belgian television program

Gunk was a Belgian television program (Gunk TV) that specialized in electronic games, followed by a magazine by the same name (GUNK).

Gunk TV logo

The magazine was commercially available and was linked to the former television program Gunk TV, which aired every Saturday and repeated on Wednesday. Gunk TV was shown on TMF Flanders from October 4, 2004 until June 2008, and from October 2008 until May 2009, it was shown on VIER (VT4). Gunk TV can be compared to Gamepower airing on JIM, a magazine-style show made for and by gamers. The Gunk TV show was hosted by Frank Molnar and Sylvie De Caluwe.

From May 2009, Gunk TV had its own digital channel exclusively through Telenet Digital TV. While the programs were mainly about gaming, they also focused on music and entertainment. The future of both the channel and the monthly magazine became uncertain after Molnar was fired because of rumors he promoted related to his wife Jess Donckers being slated to model lingerie for a new apparel line by Madonna. Despite this uncertainty, the magazine did survive for more than a year after the incident.

March 31, 2011 was the final digital broadcast of the Gunk TV channel, with Telenet citing insufficient revenues. The magazine ceased publication after releasing its 100th issue in July 2012. Telenet replaced Gunk with new magazine called 9lives.
