= Nadine Khouzam =

Belgian field hockey player

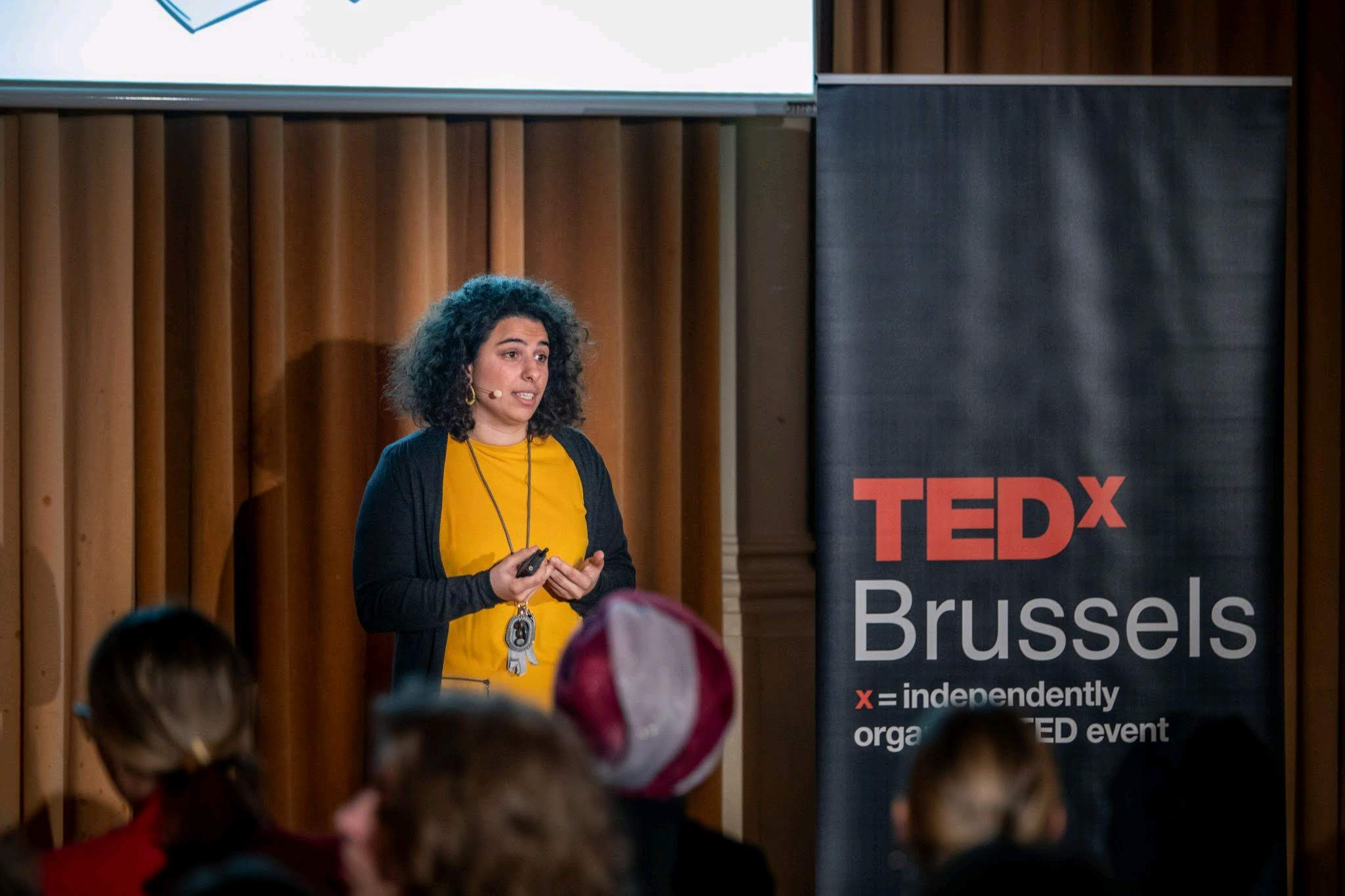

Personal information
- Nationality: Belgian
- Born: 21 June 1990 (age 35) Brussels, Belgium
- Height: 1.65 m (5 ft 5 in)
- Weight: 63 kg (139 lb)

Sport
- Country: Belgium
- Sport: Field hockey

Nadine Khouzam (born 21 June 1990 in Anderlecht) is a Belgian field hockey player. At the 2012 Summer Olympics she competed with the Belgium women's national field hockey team in the women's tournament. In 2009 she was awarded the Golden Stick by the Belgian Hockey Association in the category of female junior players.

Khouzam studied Computer Engineering at the Université libre de Bruxelles and lives in Ixelles. After her sports career, she founded and ran CodeNPlay to teach children the basics of computer science, coding and robotics. She works for social inclusion and against the digital divide.
