= Léon Lampo =

Belgian basketball player

Personal information
- Nationality: Belgian
- Born: 28 January 1923
- Died: 16 November 1985 (aged 62)

Sport
- Sport: Basketball

Léon Lampo (28 January 1923 – 16 November 1985) was a Belgian basketball player. He competed in the men's tournament at the 1948 Summer Olympics.
