= Geert Bekaert =

Geert Bekaert (1928–2016) was a Belgian architectural critic and writer on art and design. He was one of the most prolific non-fiction writers in the Dutch language of the late 20th-century. As a young man he was for some years a member of the Society of Jesus.

Bekaert's collected essays were published in nine volumes, 1985–2012. A selection of his essays has been published in English translation under the title Rooted in the Real (Ghent, 2008).

== Biography ==
Shortly after the Second World War, in 1946, Bekaert joined the Society of Jesus. As a Jesuit, he pursued studies in classical philology, art history, theology, and philosophy. In 1950, he made his debut with a text on the work of sculptor Bert Servaes in De Linie, a magazine published through Belgian-Dutch collaboration by the Society of Jesus. Bekaert continued to publish on art and architecture in De Linie, as well as in the review Streven, likewise published with Jesuit editorial involvement.

In 1958, Bekaert curated the exhibition "Ars Sacra" at Saint Peter's Church, Leuven, in collaboration with art and design critic K. N. Elno. Well into the 1960s, he played a crucial role in the discussion and theoretical development regarding secularized art vis-a-vis new, modern church architecture. In 1966, he published a booklet on the first theme with Davidsfonds, entitled Pop, het wezen van de kunst (Pop: the essence of art). His first major book on church architecture, entitled In een of ander huis: Kerkbouw op een keerpunt, was published by Lannoo in 1967.

In 2006 Ghent University acquired his library for its Faculty of Engineering and Architecture.
