= Sylvie De Caluwé =

Belgian model and television presenter

Sylvie De Caluwé (born 1986) is a Belgian model and television presenter, born in 1986 in Torhout, Belgium. She began modeling in the year 2000. Her career has since accelerated following a photo shoot for P-Magazine. Since then she has also appeared in other serial publications like Ché and Maxim.

De Caluwé appeared on the television show "Gunk TV", which catered to a young audience of technophiles and gamers, between 2004 and 2011.
