= Rose Berryl =

Belgian fantasy writer

Rose Berryl (born 26 February 1982 in Mons) is a Belgian fantasy writer. She attended secondary school at the Ursulines and undertook various studies including a year of political science and a course in art history and archeology. In February 2002, she began writing Damenndyn. Les Éditions de la Page Editions agreed to publish it in July 2004 when she was 22, then Luce Wilquin Publishing later did so in September 2005. Damenndyn is about an orphan child, protected by the priestesses of the goddess Torgani. Berryl is the 2007 winner of the Prix Gros Sel.
