= Lola Danhaive =

Belgian field hockey player

Lola Danhaive (born 4 October 1982) is a Belgian field hockey player. At the 2012 Summer Olympics she competed with the Belgium women's national field hockey team in the women's tournament.
