= Kadoc =

Dance music trio

- Origin: Spain
- Genre: techno
- Years active: 1995–97
- Label: Nukleuz
- Past members: David Penn; JC Molina; Kiké Boy; Andreas Schneider

Kadoc was a Spanish electronic music production group, made up of David Penn, JC Molina, and Enrique Pascual "Kiké Boy" López Mejía.

== History ==
The trio of Penn, Molina, and Enrique Pascual López Mejía (whose nom de disque was Kiké Boy) formed the Zen Records label in 1993, and two years later took on a commission from the Algarve nightclub KADOC to produce a theme for it, which they called "The Night Train". The trio pressed up a thousand copies, which sold out instantly.

"The Night Train" gained a full British release in January 1996 and took some time to gain momentum, but eventually topped the dance music charts for the week ending 6 April 1996, and hit number 14 on the UK Singles Chart. The success of the single meant the group got to appear on the 4 April 1996 edition of Top of the Pops, with Daren J. Bell and Azucena Recoveni fronting the group for performance purposes. The song also peaked at no. 8 in the Dutch singles charts on 30 March 1996, and also charted in 2004 and (as covered by D.O.N.S. and DBN) in 2009.

The group had two more hits in the UK Singles Chart, with further production work from Andreas Schneider: "You Got To Be There" (no. 45, August 1996) and "Rock The Bells" (no. 34, August 1997). The KADOC club, after a rebrand as LICK in 2017, closed in 2026.
