= Nicole Van Goethem =

Belgian animator and illustrator (1941–2000)

- Born: 31 May 1941; Antwerp, Flanders, Belgium
- Died: 3 March 2000 (aged 58)
- Education: Royal Conservatoire Antwerp; Royal Academy of Fine Arts
- Occupations: Animator; illustrator

Nicole Van Goethem (31 May 1941 – 3 March 2000) was a Belgian animator and illustrator. She wrote and directed A Greek Tragedy, winner of the Academy Award for Best Animated Short Film in 1987.

== Biography ==
Van Goethem was born in 1941 in Antwerp. She studied applied arts at the Sint Maria Instituut in Antwerp, Western concert flute at the Royal Conservatoire of Antwerp and evening courses at the Royal Academy of Fine Arts in the same city.

Until about the age of 30, she lived and worked in the Antwerp nightlife, but decided to quit and started working as a graphic designer and illustrator for advertising agencies and magazines. After meeting cartoonist Picha, she collaborated on his movies Tarzoon: Shame of the Jungle from 1975, and The Missing Link from 1980. She also worked on the 1984 animated movie John the Fearless by Jef Cassiers.

== Career ==
In 1985 Van Goethem finished her first short animated film, A Greek Tragedy. It won the Grand Prix at the Annecy International Animated Film Festival in 1985, and the Academy Award for Best Animated Short Film in 1987.

In 1988 she finished her second short movie, Vol van gratie (Full of Grace), about some nuns who by mistake enter a sex shop and buy what they believe to be candles, but turn out to be something else entirely. She then started working on third movie, Living Apart Together, scheduled to be about 8 minutes long and with about 75% of the work done at the time of her death.

== Exhibitions ==
- "Nicole van Goethem: Drawing the Film", Museum of Contemporary Art, Antwerp (12 December 1987 until 7 February 1988) and Cinémathèque québécoise (Montreal, Canada), 1 September 1988 until 30 September 1988
