= Raffaele Chiarelli =

Belgian footballer

Personal information
- Date of birth: 23 March 1990 (age 36)
- Place of birth: Belgium
- Height: 1.77 m (5 ft 9 1/2 in)
- Position: Central midfielder

Youth career
- Charleroi

Senior career*
| Years | Team | Apps | (Gls) |
| 2008–2010 | Charleroi | | |
| 2010–2013 | Tubize | 50 | (0) |
| 2013–2014 | UR La Louvière Centre | 13 | (1) |
| 2014–2015 | RUS Rebecquoise | 15 | (2) |
- * Club domestic league appearances and goals as of 15 October 2015

Raffaele Chiarelli (born 23 March 1990) is a Belgian football midfielder who last played for RUS Rebecquoise in Belgium.
