= 1986 Belgian regional elections =

Regional elections were held in the German-speaking Community of Belgium on 26 October 1986, to choose representatives for the Council of the German-speaking Community. They were the first elections to the Council after the German Cultural Community was changed into the German-speaking Community, with more autonomy, its own executive body, and elections that were held separately from the national legislative elections.

Following the election, the CSP and PFF formed a government led by Joseph Maraite.

== Results ==
Party	Votes	%	Seats	+/–
Christlich Soziale Partei		37.01	10	+1
Party of German-speaking Belgians		20.43	5	–2
Party for Freedom and Progress		18.77	5	–1
Socialist Party		12.71	3	0
Ecolo		6.45	1	New
Solidarity and Participation		4.11	1	New
Other parties		8.90	0	–
Total			25	0
Source: PDG
