= A Greek Tragedy =

- Directed by: Nicole Van Goethem
- Written by: Nicole Van Goethem
- Produced by: Willem Thijssen; Linda Van Tulden
- Edited by: Chris Verbiest
- Music by: Jan Boonen; Luc Redig; Rudi Renson
- Production company: CinéTé
- Release date: 1985
- Running time: 7 minutes
- Country: Belgium
- Language: Dutch

A Greek Tragedy is a 1985 Belgian animated short film written and directed by Nicole Van Goethem about three lady statues holding on to the remains of an ancient building.

== Accolades ==
The film won the Academy Award for Best Animated Short Film at the 59th Academy Awards.
