= P-Magazine =

Belgian weekly men's magazine

P-Magazine was a Belgian weekly men's magazine produced by Think Media. The magazine was created in 1998 as successor to Panorama/De Post. The headquarters of P-Magazine, published in Dutch, was in Antwerp.

The weekly had an emphasis on humor and glamour photography. Jeroen Denaeghel was the editor-in-chief of the magazine.

In January 2015, the editors of P-Magazine were given police protection following the events of the Charlie Hebdo shootings in Paris.

On 2 October 2015, the last P-Magazine issue was published. The website continued to exist but ownership has changed hands.
