= List of Bosnia and Herzegovina football supporters' associations =

This is a list of Bosnia and Herzegovina football supporters' associations. It includes the supporters of clubs in the Bosnia and Herzegovina league system and those outside Bosnia and Herzegovina who regularly support the national team.

== Bosnia and Herzegovina national football team ==
- BHFanaticos

== Bosnia and Herzegovina football supporters groups in club competitions ==
- Alcohol Boys - FK Rudar Prijedor
- Manijaci - FK Željezničar Sarajevo
- Horde Zla - FK Sarajevo
- Škripari - NK Široki Brijeg
- Ultras - HŠK Zrinjski Mostar
- Lešinari - FK Borac Banja Luka
- Red Army - FK Velež Mostar
- Robijaši - NK Čelik Zenica
- Fukare - FK Sloboda Tuzla
- Sokolovi - FK Slavija
- Incident - FK Radnik Bijeljina
- Red Dragons - NK Zvijezda Gradačac
- Gerila - NK Travnik
- Sila Nebeska - NK Jedinstvo Bihać
- Sioux - FK Radnički Lukavac
- Apachi - OFK Gradina
- Ljumani - FK Budućnost Banovići
- Vandali - NK Iskra Bugojno
- Beštije - FK Igman Konjic
- Lavovi - NK GOŠK Gabela
- Gusari - FK Rudar Kakanj
- Demoni - NK Bosna Visoko
- Red Warriors - HNK Orašje
- No Fear - FK Goražde
- Kupus Army - FK Podrinje Janja
- Vukovi - FK Drina Zvornik
- Vitezovi - NK Vitez
- Atomci - NK TOŠK Tešanj
- Hahari - NK Krajišnik Velika Kladuša
- Šejtani - FK Krajina Cazin
- Crvena legija - FK Mladost Doboj Kakanj
- Streeitsse - NK Sloga Bosanska Otoka
- Vojvode - FK Sloga Doboj

== Bosnia and Herzegovina supporters in Serbia ==
Torcida Sandžak, Ekstremi, Ultra Azzuro - FK Novi Pazar

Katili - FK Sloga Sjenica

== Bosnia and Herzegovina supporters in Montenegro ==
Gazije Rožaje - FK Ibar
