= Fenerbahçe S.K. supporters =

Supporters of the Turkish football club

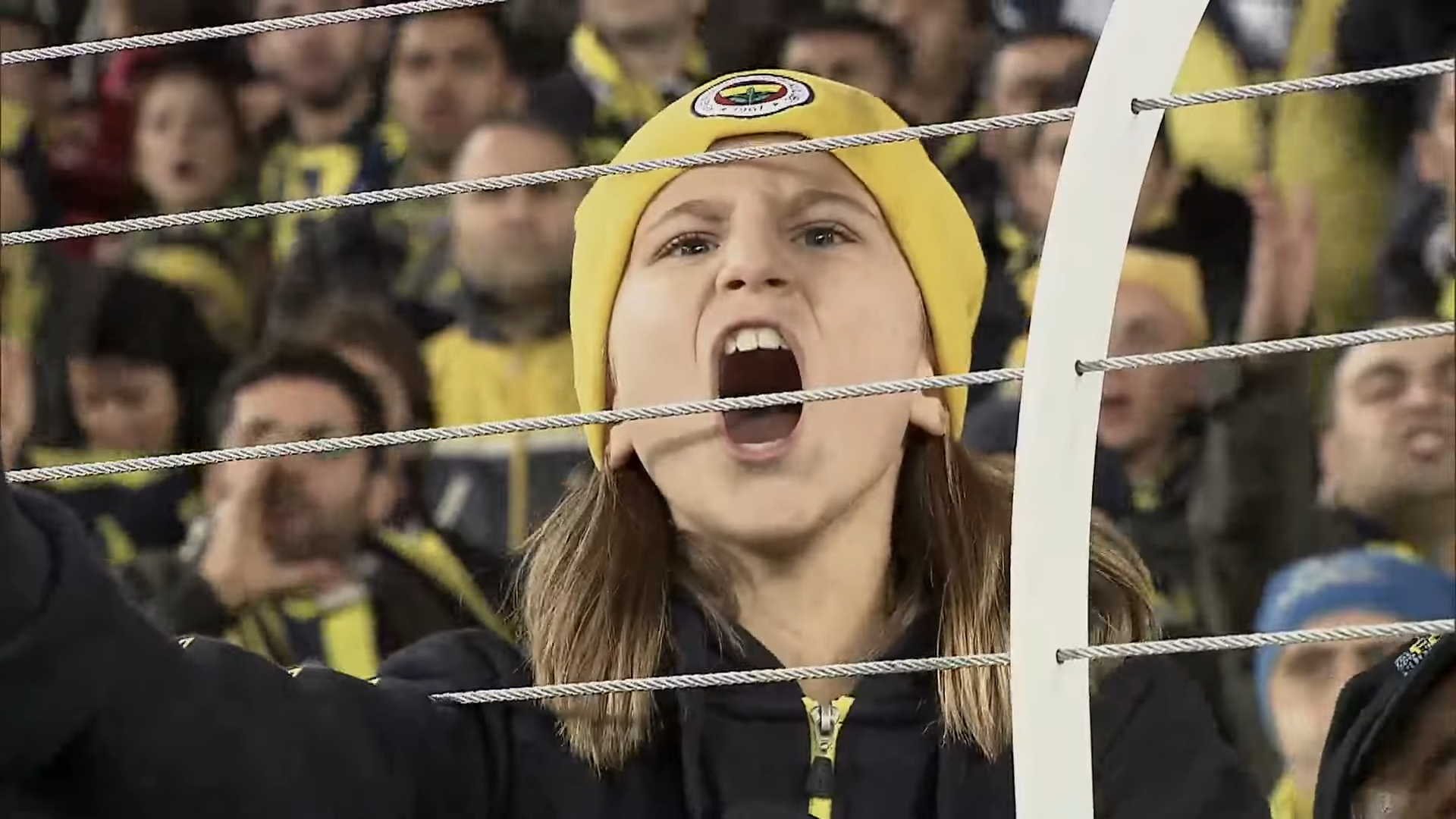
A young Fener supporter.

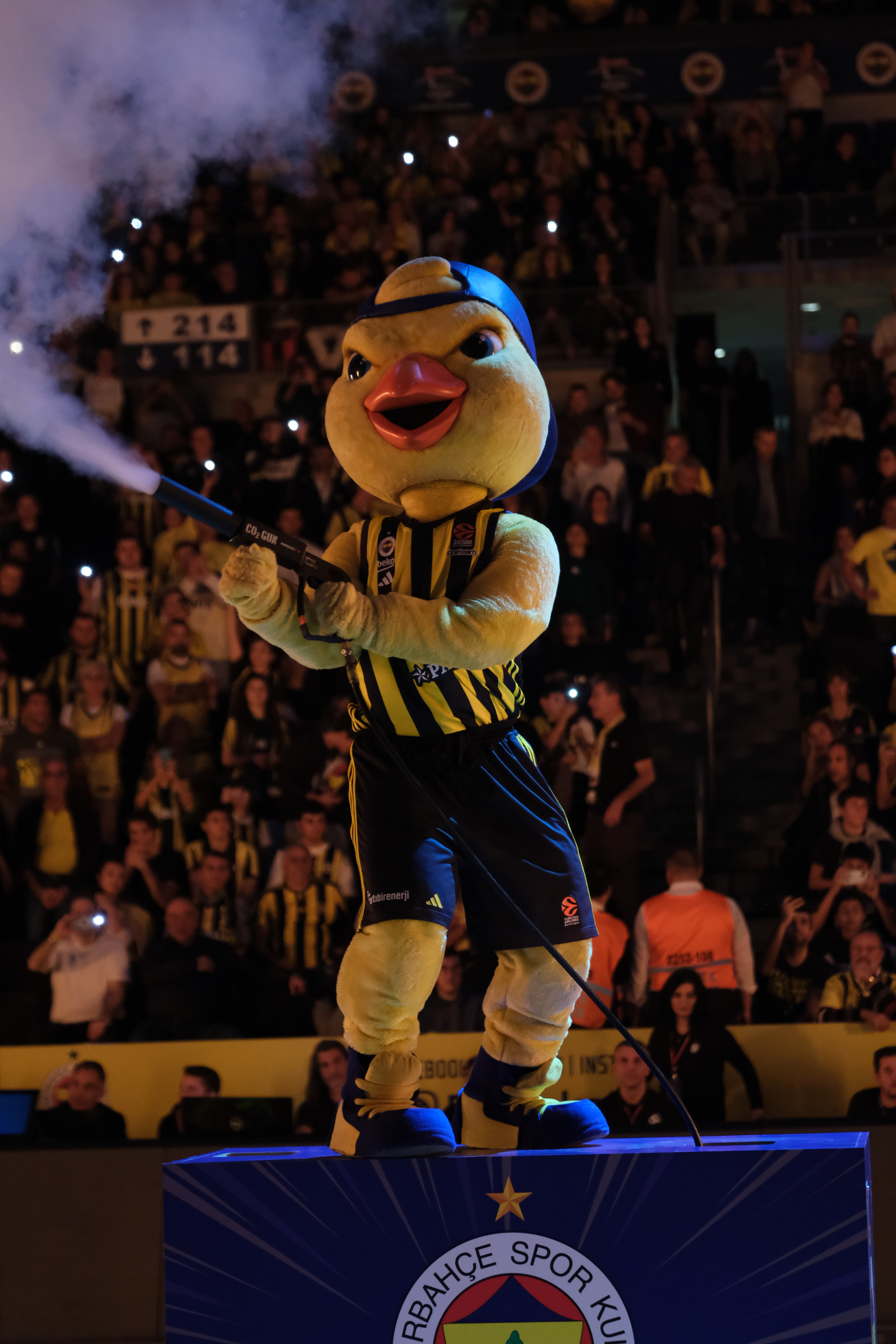
Yellow the Canary, basketball team's mascot.

Fenerbahçe SK, a major Turkish multi-sport club based in Istanbul, Turkey, have developed a strong following since their foundation in 1907. The club has a large fanbase worldwide such as in; Argentina, Brazil, South Korea the United States and in Europe, where most of the Turkish diaspora is. There are also fans from other Turkic nations such as Azerbaijan, Northern Cyprus.

The main supporter groups are; Genç Fenerbahçeliler (ultras), 1907 ÜNİFEB (university youth), 1907 Fenerbahçe (non-governmental organization) and Antu/Fenerlist (internet group).

It has been estimated that; of the 300 million people interested in football in Turkey, 80 million 580 thousand are Fenerbahçe fans. As of 2024, it has been estimated that the club has 32% of football fans in Turkey.

The supporters are known for their passionate, fierce, and unwavering support. In their football home at the Şükrü Saracoğlu Stadium, Fenerbahçe's average attendances have been among the highest in Turkey. While the attendance in Ülker Sports and Event Hall is among the highest in the Euroleague.

Many fanzines, blogs, podcasts, forums and fan websites have been dedicated to the club and the fans have long-standing rivalries with several other clubs; the most notable of these is with neighbours Galatasaray with whom they regularly contest the Intercontinental derby and Anadolu Efes, with whom they regularly contest the 'Istanbul derby' with.

The supporters of Fenerbahçe SK's motto is "Hep Destek Tam Destek", abbreviated as "HDTD" (English: "Always Support, Full Support", Spanish: "Te Apoyo Siempre, Te Apoyo Entodo").

== Rivalries ==
A 2000s survey found that Fenerbahçe supporters only see the Istanbul giants as their rivals and most dislike Galatasaray, followed by Trabzonspor and Beşiktaş, although all of Galatasaray, Beşiktaş, and Trabzonspor fans see Fenerbahçe as their main rival.

=== Fenerbahçe-Galatasaray rivalry ===
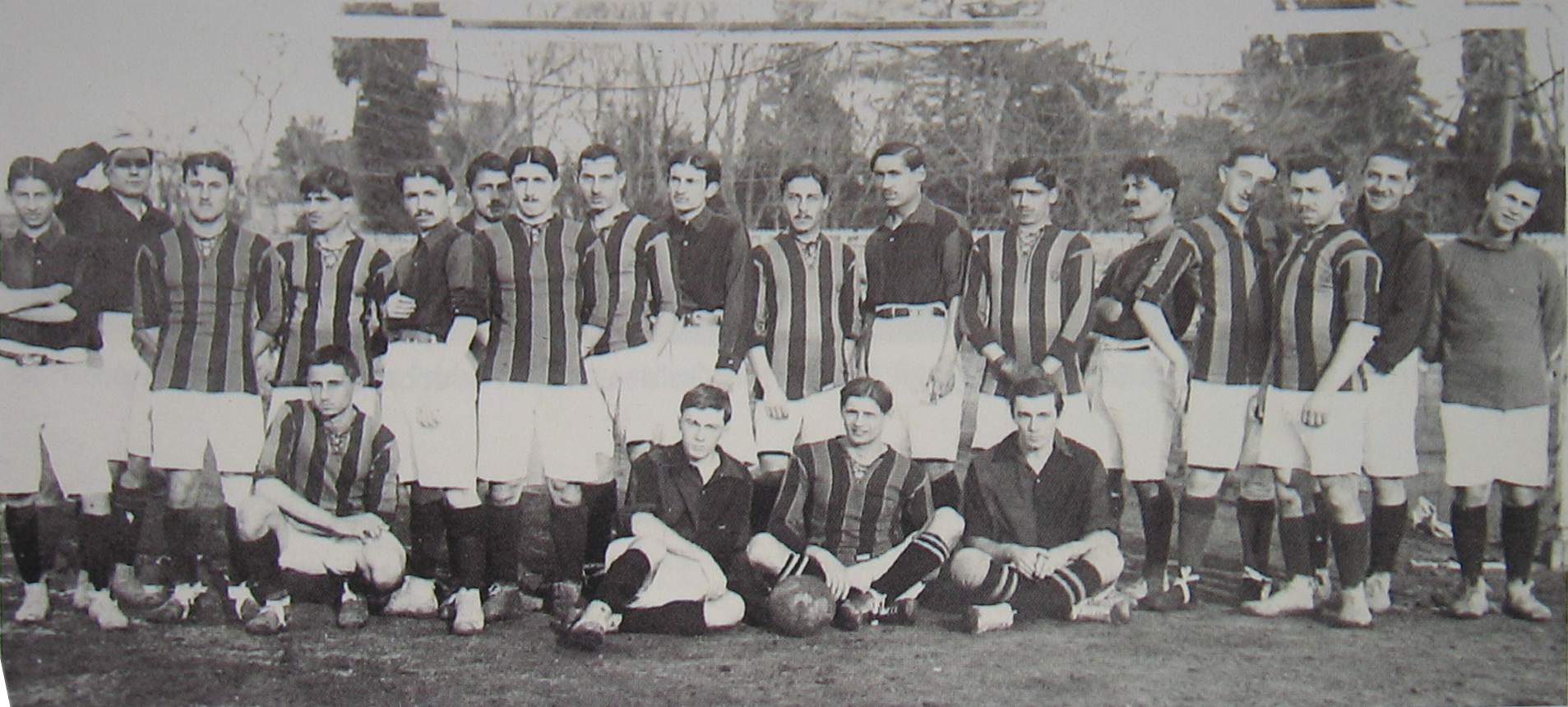
Fenerbahçe and Galatasaray squads in 1913-14 season.

Fenerbahçe's longest-running and deepest rivalry is with their nearest major neighbours, Galatasaray, with matches between the two being referred to as Intercontinental derby, also known as "the derby of immense and never ending hate". In an interview, a Fenerbahçe fan stated "I'd prefer dying honorfully and meeting my creator to living as a Galatasaray fan. Actually, I'd prefer going to hell over being a Galatasaray fan" while a Galatasaray fan stated "My hate for Fenerbahçe is more than any feeling I ever had. If Fenerbahçe was a person, I'd murder him". The derby is very popular, and during the derby hours traffic in Turkey is significantly relaxed as most are at their home watching, and the hate between the two clubs Fenerbahçe and Galatasaray has reached such a level that many fans of both clubs have died from heart attack after their clubs have lost the derby.

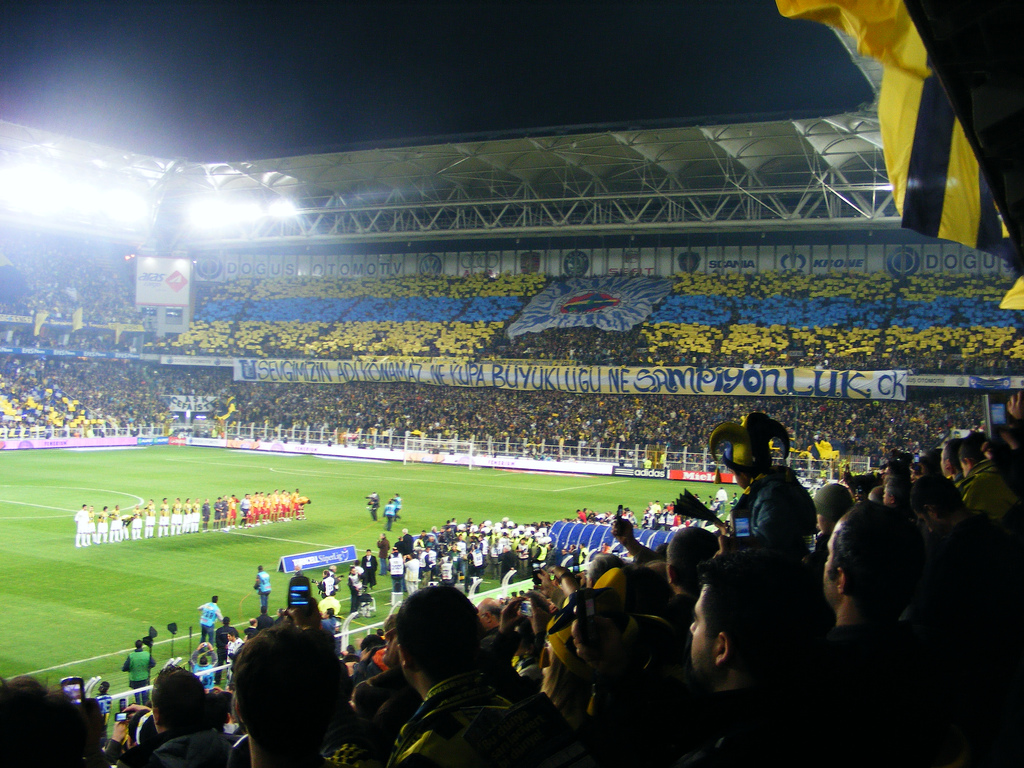
Fenerbahçe supporters in the derby match against Galatasaray.

The rivalry, previously named "the derby of friendship", has turned into a derby of hate on 23 February 1934, when a friendly game between both clubs turned into a riot, forcing the match to be abandoned. The rivalry has led to violence among supporters on numerous occasions. Torches, smoke, flags, and giant posters are used to create visual grandeur and apply psychological pressure on visiting teams, which fans call "welcoming them to hell".

=== Fenerbahçe-Efes rivalry ===
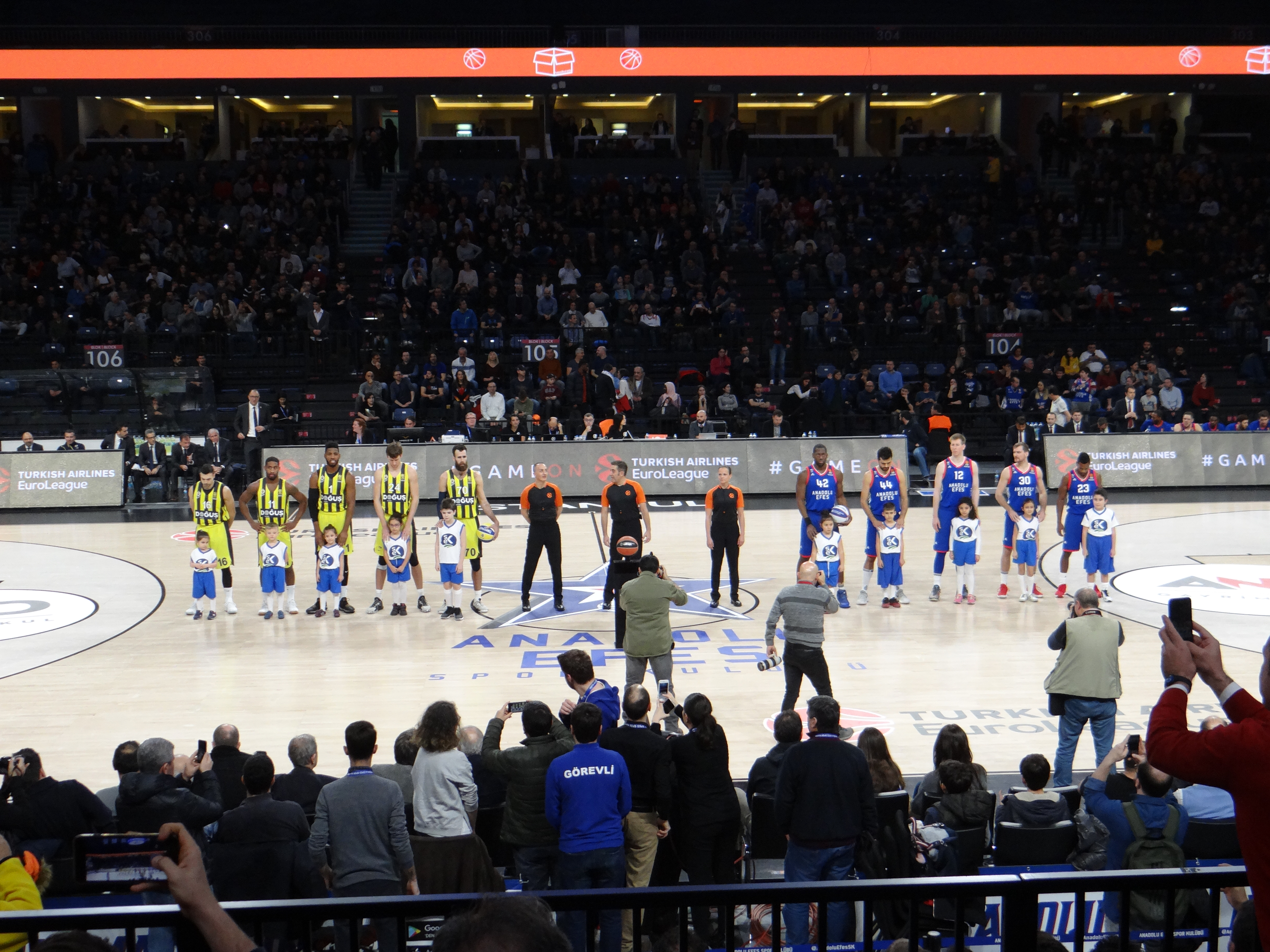
Anadolu Efes vs Fenerbahçe in EuroLeague.

Anadolu Efes and Fenerbahçe have faced each other 201 times in official matches since November 12, 1978. Fenerbahçe won 85 of these matches and Anadolu Efes won 116. In the 10 special matches recorded, Anadolu Efes won 6 times and Fenerbahçe won 4 times. The team that won the most consecutive matches was Anadolu Efes with 14 official and 1 private match between 24 January 1999 and 5 December 2004. In Fenerbahçe, this number is 10 matches.

Due to their rivalry in the EuroLeague, their matches are called the 'Istanbul Derby'.

In the first match of the semi-finals of the 22-23 Basketball Super League Playoffs, Fenerbahçe defeated Anadolu Efes by 108-66, with a difference of 42 points. With this result, Fenerbahçe broke new record in its competition against Anadolu Efes. The yellow-dark blue team achieved its biggest victory in all the matches it played against its opponent in history, with a difference of 42 points. In addition, this result was the most different defeat suffered by Anadolu Efes in a Basketball Super League match.

=== Other rivalries ===
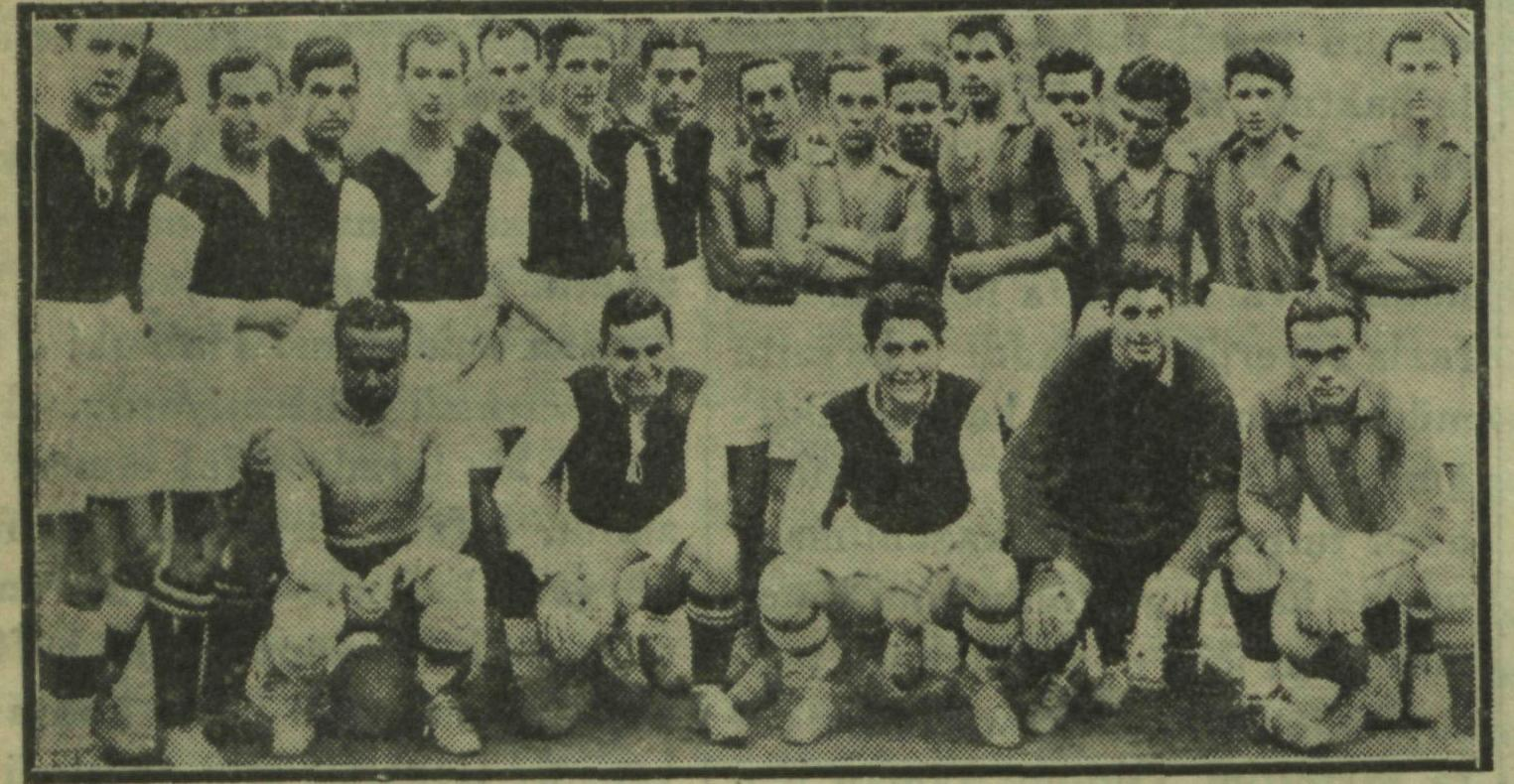
Fenerbahçe and Beşiktaş squads in 1932.

Matches against Beşiktaş are also derbies, but the rivalry is not as intense and fierce as like between Fener and Gala. These derbies are referred to as the "friendly derby".

Fenerbahçe and Trabzonspor have had a strong on-pitch rivalry since the late 1970s. This has cultivated in recent years to off-the-pitch hate among fanbases. Hate between two sides grew rapidly after a 2014 match between Trabzonspor and Fenerbahce was called off at half time after the Istanbul club's players were pelted with objects thrown onto the pitch by home fans. Aggression followed with Fenerbahce team bus came under armed attack on its way to the airport in 2015. Tensions reached a peak point in 2024, where the supporters of Trabzonspor stormed the pitch and fought with Fenerbahce players and security forces following their team's 3-2 loss.

== Friendships with other clubs ==
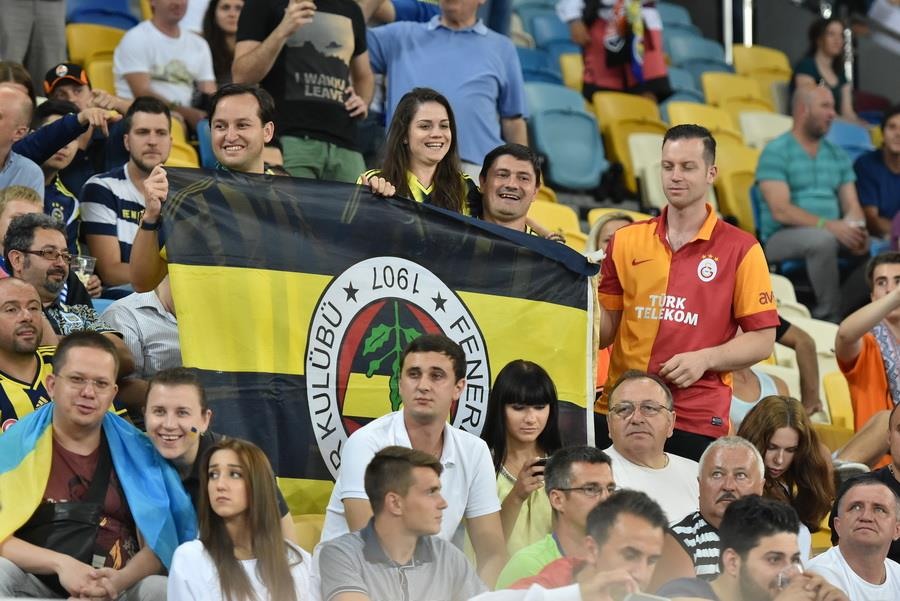
Fenerbahçe supporters with a Galatasaray fan at a match against FC Shakhtar Donetsk in the Champions League

Fenerbahçe has friendly relations with clubs from different countries. Some include: in Turkey, Kırklarelispor, Menemenspor, Eskişehir Demirspor, Ankara Demirspor, Eskişehirspor and many more; in Brazil, Coritiba; in Serbia, Novi Pazar; in Norway: Lillestrøm, in Greece; AEK and; in England, Sheffield United; in the Netherlands, Feyenoord; in Germany: Bayern Munich.

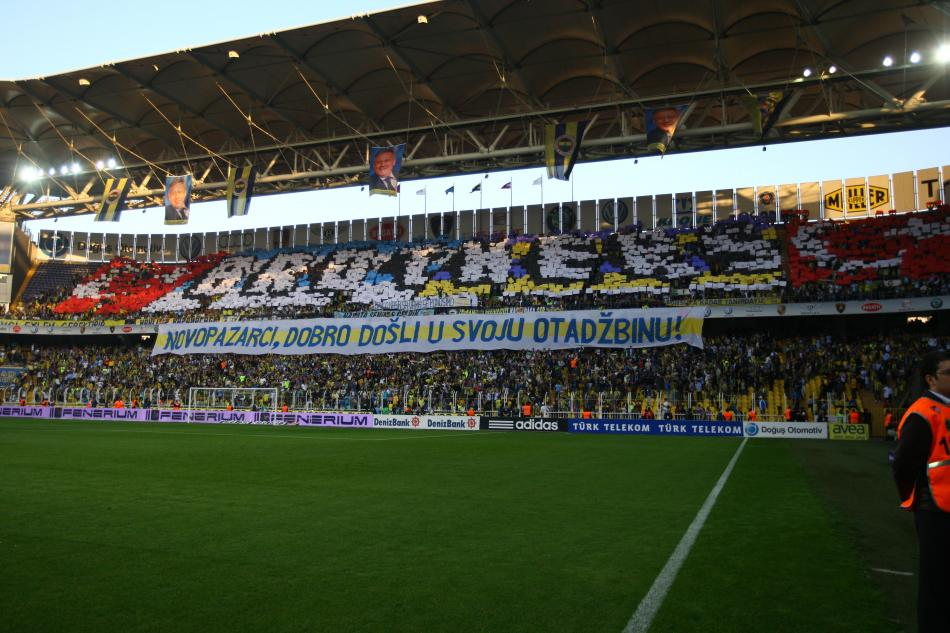
A FB-TorcidaSandžak match

In November 2011, Fenerbahçe's GFB created a friendly relationship with Serbian club FK Novi Pazar's supporter group Torcida Sandžak. During a Turkish Super League match against İstanbul Büyükşehir Belediyespor at the Şükrü Saracoğlu Stadium, the GFB and 1907 Gençlik stands deployed a giant banner reading "Kalbimiz Seninle Novi Pazar" ("Novi Pazar, Our Hearts Are With You"). Eventually, in the match against Radnički Kragujevac in the Serbian SuperLiga, Torcida Sandžak members deployed a banner reading "Sancak'ta atıyor, Fenerbahçe'nin kalbi" ("The heart of Fenerbahçe beats in Sandžak"). This was further solidifed with the founding of 'Sandzakfener' organization in 2023.

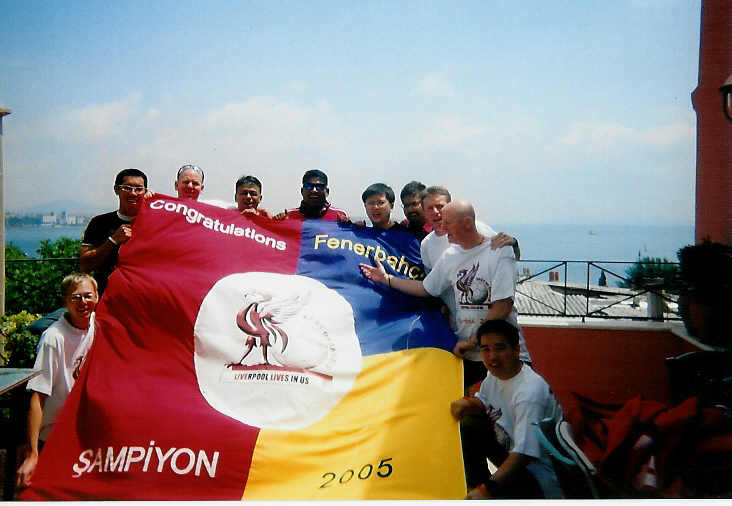
Liverpool and Fenerbahce fans

There is an informal friendship and fraternization between the fans of AEK and Fenerbahçe. In the 2017 Euroleague final, Fenerbahçe S.K. supporters displayed a banner which read "Same City's Sons"

In addition; Fenerbahçe, Beşiktaş and Galatasaray were officially brother clubs in the 1910s, due to the fact that their common goal was to defeat non-Turkish teams. This, however, is no longer the case.

== Incidents ==
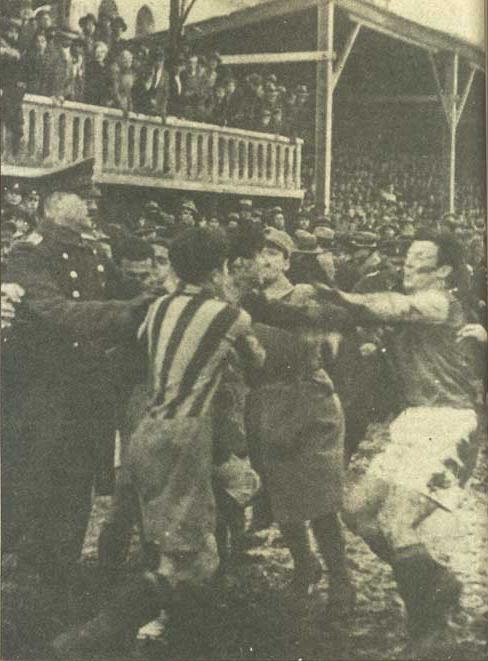
Fighting after a match in 1934. The player of Fenerbahçe on the left is Hüsamettin Böke, the player of Galatasaray on the right is Lütfü Aksoy.

Notorious Fenerbahce hooligans in 1987, shot both a Beşiktaş youth football player, Mehmet Ozkan, and a Beşiktaş supporter with a firearm, but both survived. Fenerbahce Hooligans attacking those who came to the match attacked the police station where Beşiktaş fans were hiding.

On 13 December 1993, a Fenerbahçe fan was beaten to death by Beşiktaş fans in a cafe after celebrating the Fenerbahçe victory.

In the 1995–96 season, Fenerbahçe were the unmatched dominating force in football while Galatasaray were considered a smaller team. When Galatasaray reached the cup final against Fenerbahçe, Fenerbahçe were expected to win easily, however Galatasaray beat Fenerbahçe in the first leg by a Dean Saunders penalty. Their manager Graeme Souness took a giant Galatasaray flag after the match and planted it in the centre of the pitch and insulted Fenerbahçe and its supporters in order to provoke and anger the Fenerbahçe fans.

In 1996, after a derby match, 1 Galatasaray supporters were stabbed to death by a Fenerbahçe stand leader, known as Esenlerli Sebo.

In 2006 Galatasaray supporters opened a racist banner which targeted Mehmet Aurélio, player of Fenerbahçe and the Turkey national team with Brazilian roots. The Fenerbahçe supporters protested which resulted in them getting attacked by Galatasaray fans.

In 2012, a Galatasaray supporter named Ugur Fakili was stabbed to death by a Fenerbahçe fan with whom he had an argument before the match.

On 13 May 2013, a Fenerbahçe fan was stabbed multiple times to death after the Intercontinental Derby. After the match, which resulted in a 2–1 victory for Fenerbahçe, the 19 year old Fenerbahçe fan was on his way home after the match when he and his companions were attacked by Galatasaray fans.

On 27 July 2022, during the UEFA Champions League qualifier game against Dynamo Kyiv, there were chants supporting Vladimir Putin by a small number of Fenerbahçe fans. The Fenerbahçe's president said that the club will not apologise for the chants. The game played during the 2022 Russian invasion of Ukraine.

== Politics ==
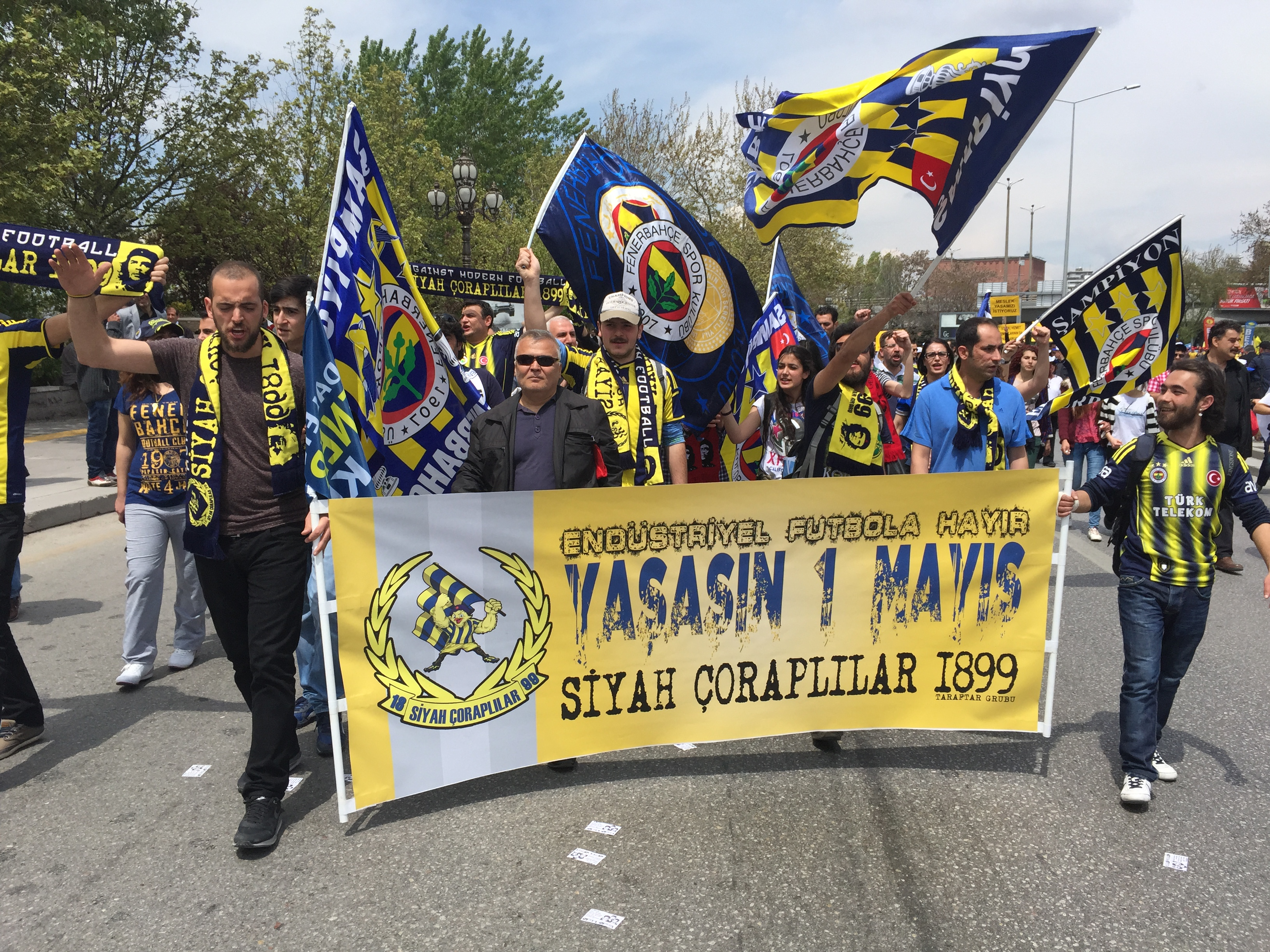
Fenerbahçe fans in May Day

Fenerbahçe fans are mostly in secular and social-democratic leaning. Many Fenerbahçe fans believe that Recep Tayyip Erdoğan and the Gülen Movement (officially deemed a terrorist organisation by Turkey) are trying to gain control of the club while ex-president Aziz Yıldırım openly accused certain “elements” of trying “to seize [control of] Turkish football by influencing the state's legislative, executive and judiciary bodies to punish Fenerbahçe's Kemalist stance.” As a result, Fenerbahçe supporters do not have good relations with government forces around the country, especially the General Directorate of Security.

== Notable supporters ==
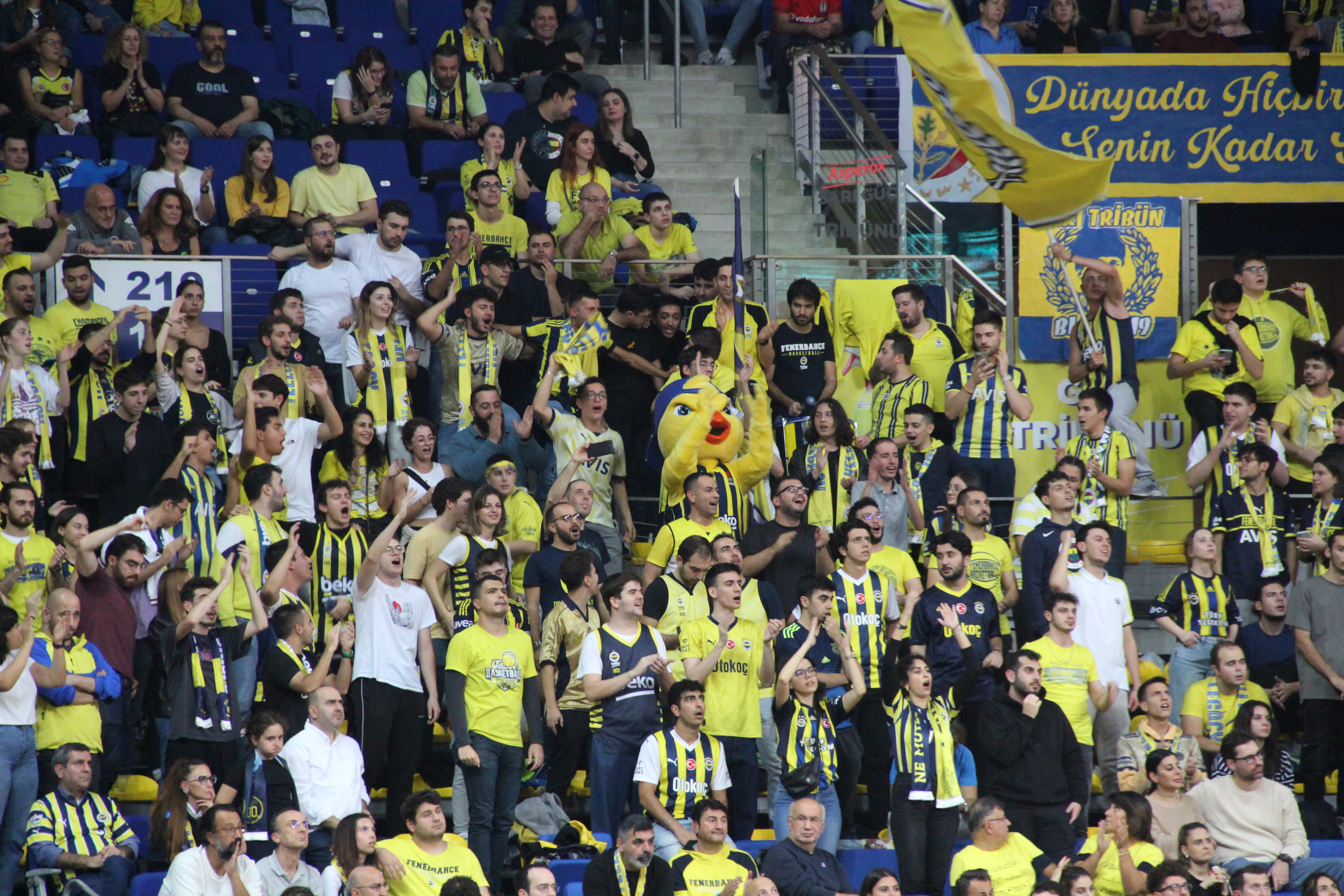
Supporters in a basketball match

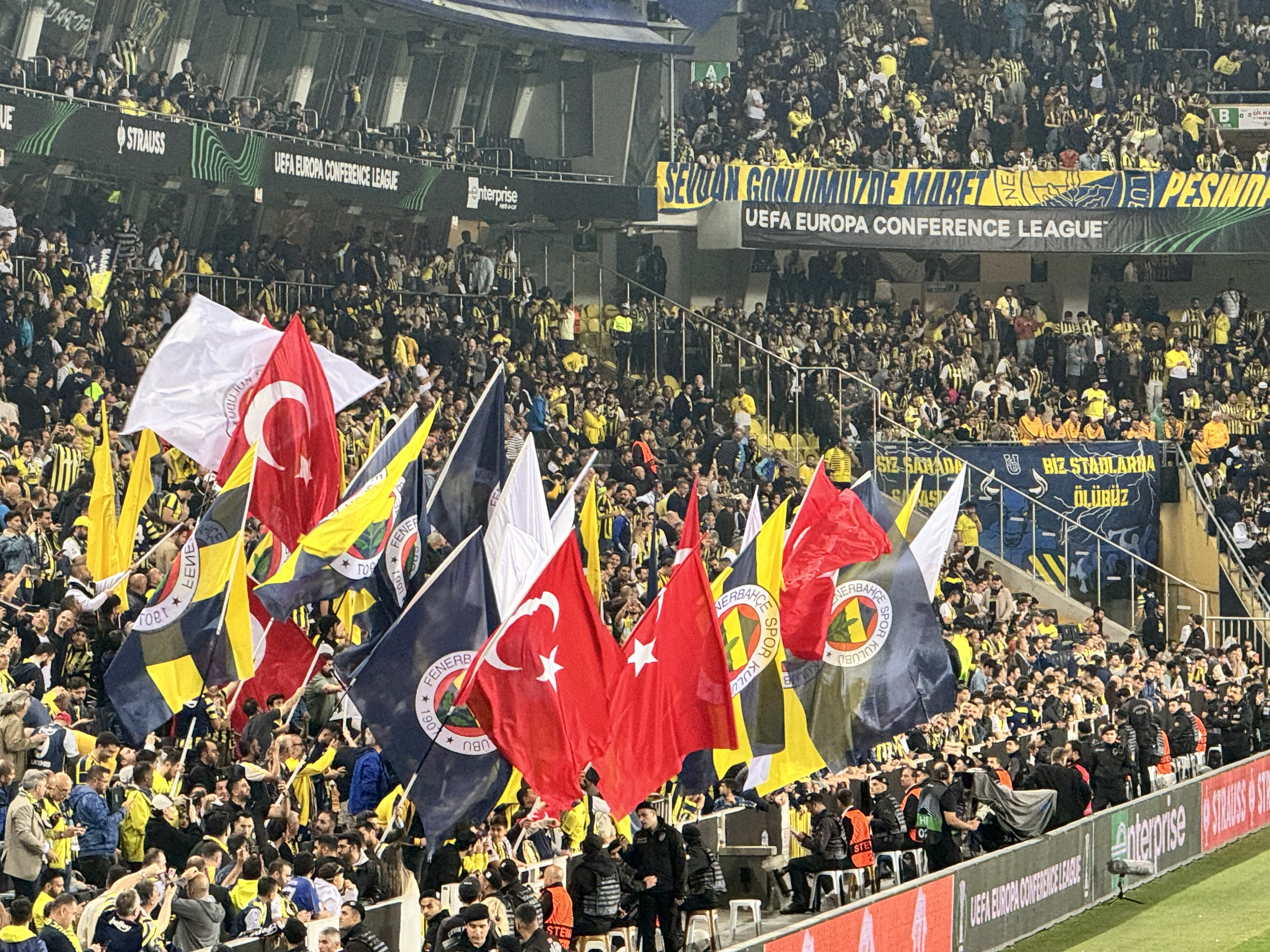
Supporters in a football match

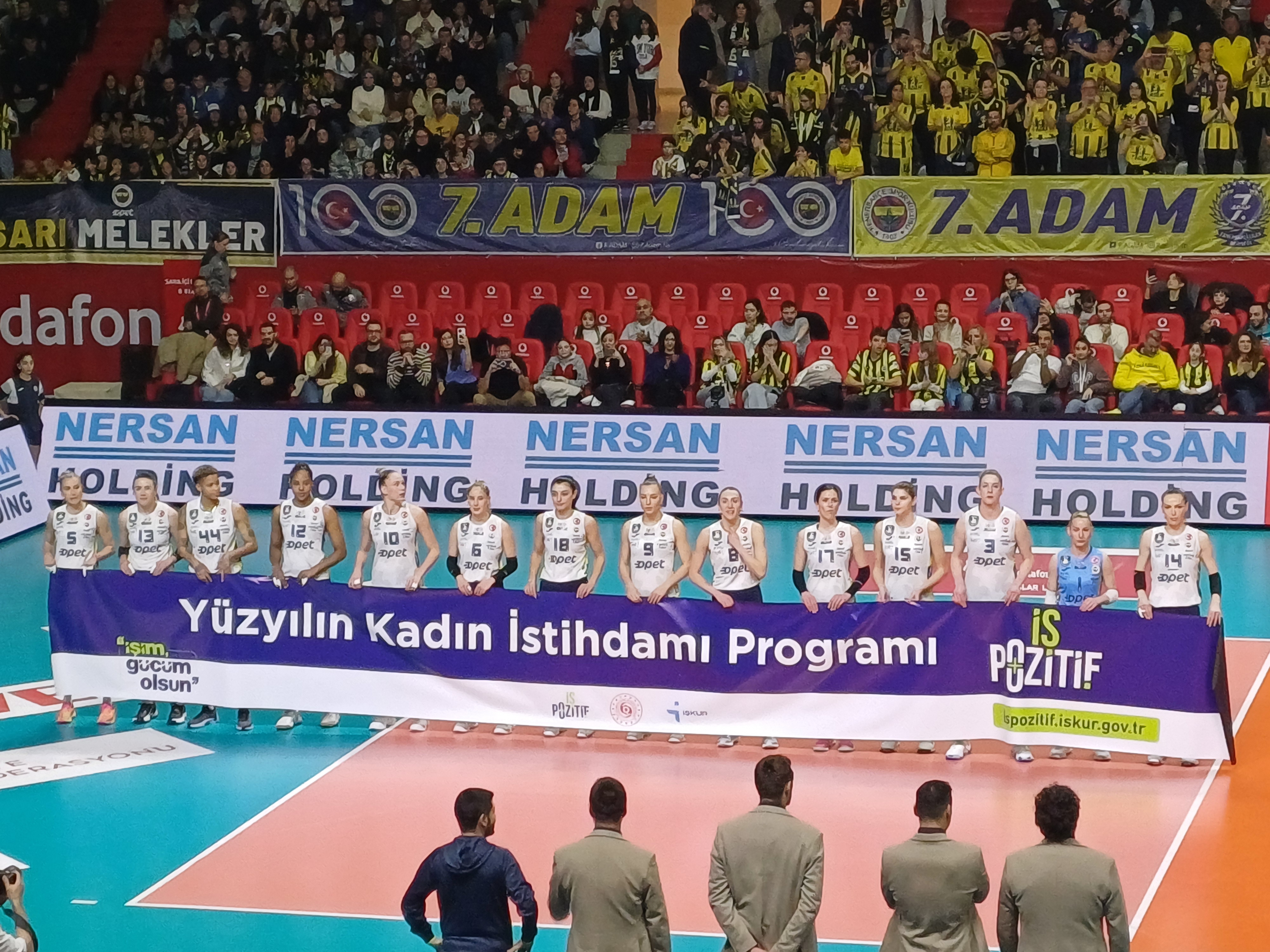
Supporters in a volleyball match

Below is a list of people who are known as Fenerbahçe SK supporters:

=== Presidents of Turkey ===
- Mustafa Kemal Atatürk
- Cevdet Sunay
- Fahri Korutürk
- Kenan Evren
- Turgut Özal
- Recep Tayyip Erdoğan

=== Presidents of Northern Cyprus ===
- Rauf Denktaş

=== Prime Ministers of Turkey ===
- Yıldırım Aktuna
- Necmettin Erbakan
- Şükrü Saraçoğlu (has also been Fenerbahçe's 16th president between 1934 and 1950)
- Ahmet Davutoğlu

=== Ministers of Turkey ===
- Mevlüt Çavuşoğlu
- Ali Babacan
- Egemen Bağış
- Cemil Çiçek
- Ertuğrul Günay
- Mehmet Şimşek
- İsmet Yılmaz
- Ömer Çelik

=== Other politicians ===
- Kemal Kılıçdaroğlu
- Alparslan Türkeş
- Özgür Özel

=== Chief of the Turkish General Staff ===
- Hilmi Özkök
- Yaşar Büyükanıt
- İlker Başbuğ
- Işık Koşaner

=== Istanbul Governors ===
- Muammer Güler

=== British Ambassadors ===
- Dominick Chilcott

=== Actors and actresses ===
- Tarık Akan
- Nejat İşler
- Halit Akçatepe
- Şafak Sezer
- Kemal Sunal
- all Hababam Sınıfı actors
- Cem Yılmaz
- Zeki Alasya
- Sadri Alışık
- Ekrem Bora
- Haldun Dormen
- Fikret Hakan
- Ediz Hun
- Kadir İnanır
- Tolgahan Sayışman
- Tuba Büyüküstün
- Ceyda Düvenci
- Şevket Çoruh
- Emre Kınay
- Barış Arduç
- Burak Özçivit
- Zeynep Sever
- Amine Gülşe Özil

=== Musicians ===
- Fazıl Say
- Athena
- Alişan
- Moğollar
- Tarkan
- Ajda Pekkan
- Cem Karaca
- Işın Karaca
- Kıraç
- Duman
- Zerrin Özer
- Funda Arar
- Sibel Can
- Bülent Serttaş
- Tuğba Ekinci
- Gülben Ergen
- Bülent Ersoy
- Ebru Gündeş
- Burak Kut
- Murat Dalkılıç
- Ziynet Sali
- Seda Sayan
- Emel Sayın
- İbrahim Tatlıses
- Mikis Theodorakis
- Yıldız Tilbe
- Hande Yener
- İlhan Şeşen

=== Television & radio personalities ===
- Deniz Akkaya
- Halit Kıvanç
- Bedri Baykam
- Beyazıt Öztürk
- Okan Bayülgen
- Cansu Dere
- Mehmet Ali Erbil
- Acun Ilıcalı
- Asuman Krause
- Tülin Şahin
- Demet Şener
- Gönül Yazar
- Abdülkerim Durmaz
- Enes Batur
- Erdal Özyağcılar
- Jahrein

=== Writers and novelists ===
- Yaşar Kemal
- Zülfü Livaneli
- Cengiz Çandar
- Can Dündar
- Uğur Dündar
- Orhan Pamuk
- Nazım Hikmet

=== Historians ===
- Emrah Safa Gürkan

=== Sports people ===
- Mehmet Okur
- Hidayet Türkoğlu
- Mesut Özil
- Neymar
- Alex de Souza
- Volkan Demirel
- Cedi Osman
- Alp Tuzel
- Emre Belözoğlu

=== Other business people ===
- Nezih Barut
- Aziz Yıldırım
- Ali Koç
- Sadettin Saran

=== Religious speakers ===
- Ahmet Mahmut Ünlü
