= Sports fandom =

Community of sports fans

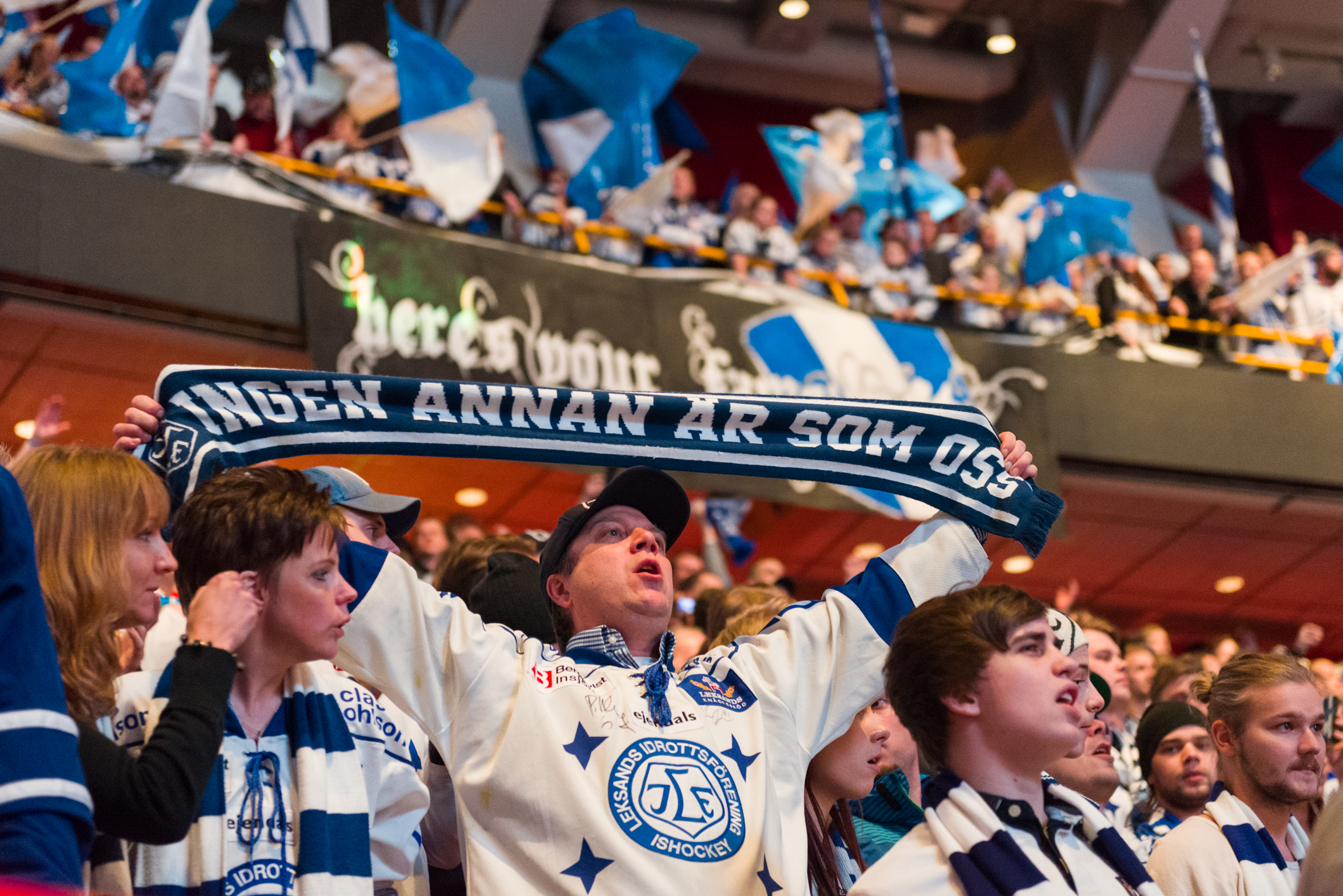
Supporters from Leksand IF, Swedish ice hockey team.

Sports fandom is the community of fans sharing interests in sports, particularly spectator sports.

Emerging as a significant cultural phenomenon in the late 19th century, the sports fandom has evolved alongside the commercialization and globalization of sports, shaping modern entertainment and social identities. Fans participate in various ways, including attending live events, watching broadcasts, engaging in online discussions, and forming dedicated communities around specific sports or teams. While historically associated with the working class, sports fandom has become widespread across different social classes, with factors such as media accessibility and the rising costs of live attendance influencing participation patterns. The nature of sports fandom varies across regions and sports disciplines, encompassing both team-based sports, such as football and basketball, and individual sports, such as boxing and tennis. Dedicated sports fans often exhibit emotional investment in their teams' successes and failures.

== History ==
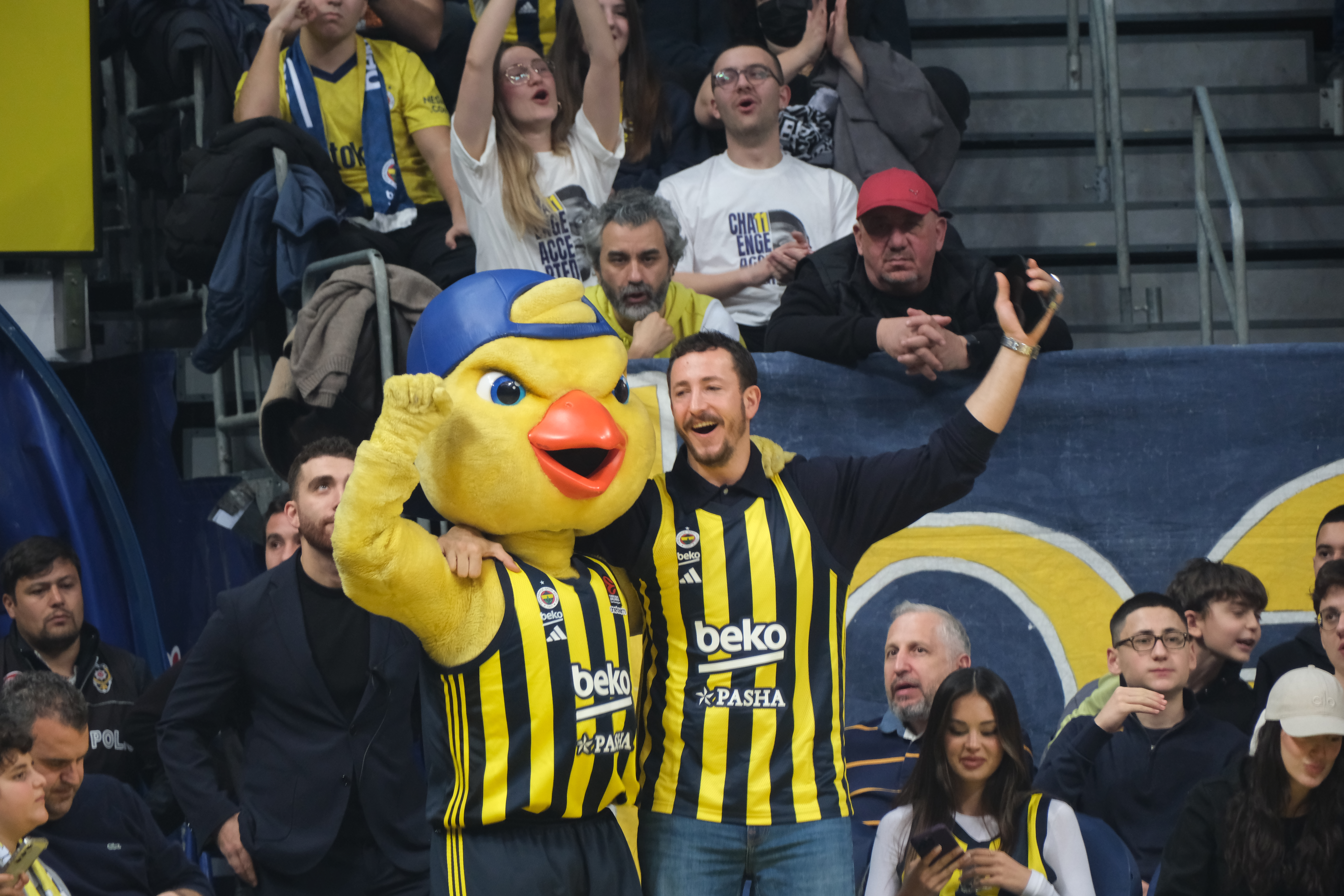
The mascot of Fenerbahçe Basketball, Yellow, with Fenerbahçe S.K. supporters

In the Roman Empire, sports clubs were highly popular. Gladiatorial combat and chariot races were some of the most well known. During the Medieval Period, a chariot racing event on the Ides of January in Constantinople (the capital of the Roman Empire at the time) featured such polarized sporting organizations between the Blues and the Greens that they instigated a riot and senators envious of Emperor Justinian and Empress Theodora's power or otherwise unsupportive of their policies assisted the riotous crowd in attempting to install the late Emperor Anastasius's nephew Hypatius as Emperor which came to be known as the Nika Revolt. The generals Belisarius and Mundus, on Theodora's orders which were also approved by Justinian, suppressed the rebellion in the stadium in the Hippodrome killing tens of thousands of people. The modern sports fandom, emerging in the late 19th century as a popular pastime for the working class, and gaining much popularity in the 20th century, has become an important modern subculture. It has seen a number of changes; for example, some fan activities have emerged and others have disappeared; in the last few decades, the Internet has significantly affected how people consume and participate in various means of entertainment, such as sports. Over time, sport fandom has also become more common for the middle and upper class, and more affected by the commodification of sports. Due to the increased costs of participating in sport events in person, as a spectator, in recent decades, middle class members have become dominant in the context of physical sport spectatorship.

For example, in the United States, historically, professional boxing and horse racing used to be much more popular than they are now; basketball, while still popular, has lost much of its former popularity to American football, while new popular sports are emerging (such as auto racing).

The success or failure of various sports have been tied to various factors, such as nationalism, globalization as well as resourcefulness and activities of sports organizations.

Scholars have studied the sport fandom since c. 1980s.

=== Characteristics ===
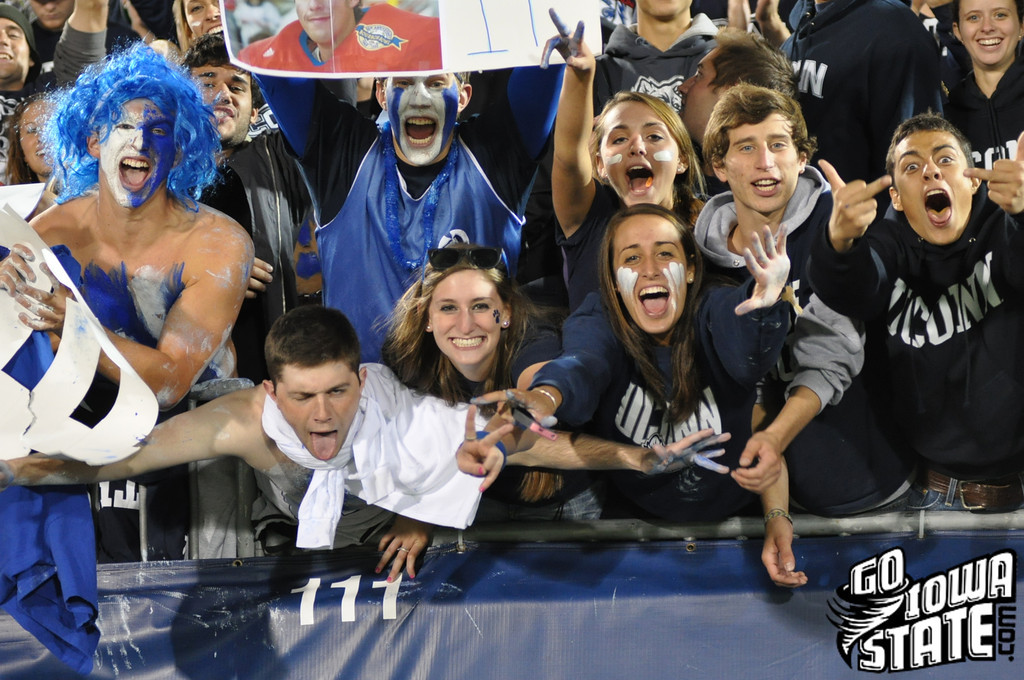
American college football supporters of the Connecticut Huskies in a 2011 game against the Iowa State Cyclones.

The specific sport fandoms can significantly differ between different countries. The most common sport fandoms are those related to major team sports, such as association football, baseball and basketball, although individual sports (such as professional boxing, tennis, auto racing or cycle sports) also have significant fan bases. Some sport fandoms are mostly regional, as some sports can be very popular in one region but mostly unknown in others; such regional fandoms involve those for American football (in the USA), ice hockey (in Canada) and cricket (in countries of the British Commonwealth). In the 2010s, over 8,000 different sport disciplines have been identified, and each could be said to have its own fandom.

Sport fandom is generally understood to pertain to activities requiring significant physical fitness; this however can blur when considering related hobbies, such as bowling, poker or chess, or more recently, the concepts of fantasy sport and esports.

Sport fandom is increasingly affected by the commercialization and commodification of sports, with numerous products designed for sports fans, from merchandise (sport-themed apparels, memorabilia, and like) to services (such as sport bars, themed events like sport-themed weddings, and others).

=== Sports fans ===
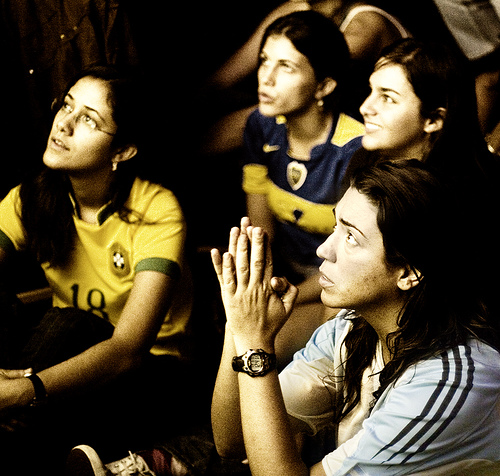
Association football fans watching a 2006 FIFA World Cup match between Argentina and Germany at a bar

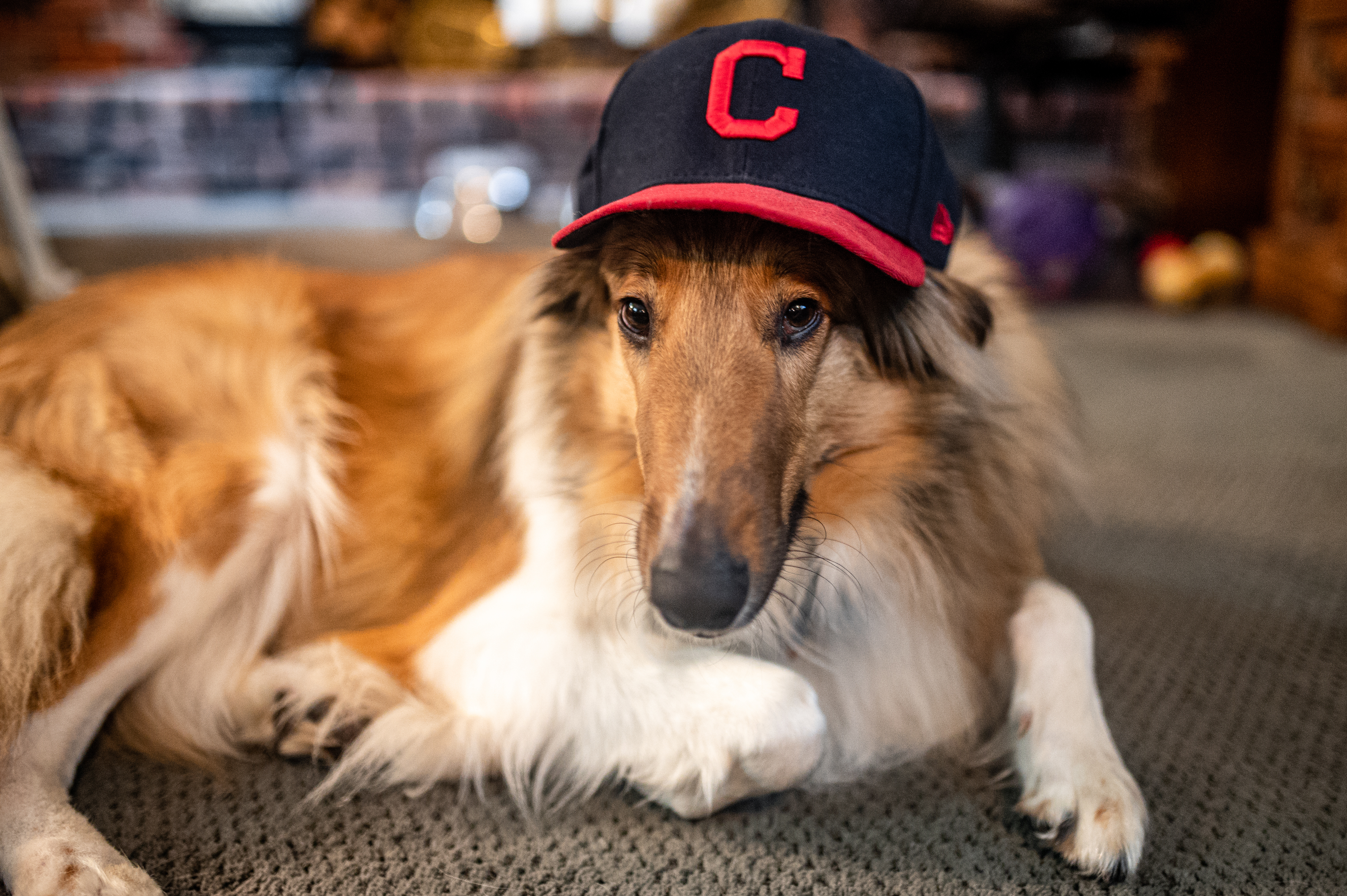
Some sports fans dress their pets up in team apparel, such as this dog wearing a Cleveland Indians hat

A sports fan (also supporter) can be an enthusiast for a particular athlete, team, sport, or all of organized sports as a whole. Sports fans often attend sporting events in stadiums, in sports bars, or watch them at home, and follow news through newspapers, websites, and social media. Most fans have an emotional attachment to, and appreciation for, their favorite teams and players; less common is the more general attachment and appreciation to the entire type of sport. The mentality of the sports fan is often such that they will experience a game, or event while living vicariously through players or teams whom the fan favors.

One of the differences between sports fans and fans of other types of activities (such as fans of various media) is the sport-related focus on winning, losing, and uncertainty of outcomes.

Many fans participate in face to face events with other fans, most can be seen as being a part of an imagined community, perceiving themselves as sports fans. Sports fans vary in how important their hobby is to their lives. One can consider themselves a sports fan despite never having played said sport (and most sports fans are not actively playing their favorite sports), having witnessed a professional sporting event, or having connected with other sports fans. The most common activity of a sports fan is watching sports on television. The most dedicated sports fans have extensive knowledge about their sports, and can even develop careers in fields such as sports commentators or sports writers, or can be involved in managing sports teams, either professionally or through mobilization in activities such as those designed to change (or prevent the change) in the ownership of the team.

Scholars have created a number of differing and sometimes contradictory typologies of sport fans.

The majority of sports fans are male. Working class members are more likely to be fans of the most popular sports, while middle and upper class members are more likely to be fans of less popular ones.

Some sports fans engage in violence (such as sports riot or football hooliganism).

== See also ==
- Cheerleading
- Fan (person)
- Number-one ticket holder
- Sociology of sport
- Tifo and Tifosi
- Ultras
- Famous sport fans
