= Cilou Annys =

Belgian beauty pageant titleholder

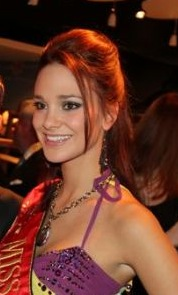
- Born: Cilou Annys; 20 March 1991 (age 35); Bruges, Belgium
- Height: 5 ft 10 in (1.78 m)
- Beauty pageant titleholder
- Title: Miss Belgium 2010
- Hair color: Brown
- Eye color: Hazel
- Major competitions: Miss Belgium 2010 (Winner); Miss Universe 2010 (Top 15); Miss World 2010

Cilou Annys (born 20 March 1991) is a Belgian model and beauty pageant titleholder who won Miss Belgium 2010 on 10 January 2010. She is also Miss West Flanders. Annys, the 80th Miss Belgium, accepted the crown from Zeynep Sever, Miss Belgium 2009.

== Controversy ==
Annys caused controversy when she posed on the cover of P-Magazine, standing on the Belgian flag, with Flemish nationalist politician Bart De Wever pictured cutting her "Miss Belgium" sash.

Annys and the national committee of the Miss Belgium contest immediately issued a press release in which they apologized to anyone who may have been offended by this image.

== Miss Universe 2010 ==
She placed in the Top 15 at the Miss Universe 2010 pageant held on 23 August 2010 in Las Vegas, Nevada and competed in Miss World 2010 a few months later.

== Personal life ==
Annys studies interpreting and translation (French and Spanish) at the Hogeschool Gent.

Awards and achievements
Preceded by Zeynep Sever	Miss Belgium; 2010	Succeeded by Justine De Jonckheere
