= Ekstremi =

Football team supporter group

- Abbreviation: EX'04
- Founded: 2004
- Type: Supporters' group, Ultras group
- Team: FK Novi Pazar
- Motto: Niko kao mi Pazar Ekstremi - Nobody like us, Pazar Ekstremi!
- Headquarters: Novi Pazar, Serbia
- Stadium: Novi Pazar City Stadium
- Stand: North
- Coordinates: 43°9′0″N 20°31′0″E

Ekstremi is a supporter group of the Novi Pazar based professional football club FK Novi Pazar. Ekstremi is, together with Torcida Sandžak and the Ultra Azzurro, the most important supporter group of FK Novi Pazar.

== History ==
In the 1980s, FK Novi Pazar became a regular team in the Yugoslav Second League. The supporters in those days were called the "Pazarci" (Inhabitants of Pazar) or the "Supporters of Novi Pazar". Although they were well organized, they cannot be called real supporters. First organized group of supporters in Novi Pazar started in 1984, under the name "Blue Hunters". As FK Novi Pazar was knocking on Yugoslav First League's door, these supporters traveled with the club around the country. While many organized groups were forming all over the country in the 1980s, a few more were formed in Novi Pazar. Fighters in 1987, Pirates, Eagles, the Blue Girls in 1988, and Blue Warriors in 1989. The unification of all supporter groups happened in 1989 under the name Torcida Sandžak. In 1998, a new group was formed under the name of Ultra Azzurro. After six years of co-existence of the two supporter groups, in 2004, the new supporter group Ekstremi were formed. They quickly tried to incorporate members of Torcida Sandžak and Ultra Azzurro into their group, which caused problems as most members of both groups refused to become a part of the new group. This completely separated them and left the sides bitter.

== Controversies ==
On 13 August 2012, just before the football match between FK Novi Pazar and Radnički Niš, it came to battles between Torcida Sandžak and the Ekstremi. The main clash occurred at the time when the members of Torcida Sandžak wanted to put a banner on the north stand of the Novi Pazar City Stadium. Their rivals, the Ekstremi, set the banner on fire and then the conflict broke out. A member of the fan group Ekstremi was stabbed with a knife in the chest and suffered serious life-threatening injuries. After the version of the Ekstremi, just before the match, at the entrance to the city park, one member was attacked by rival supporters Torcida Sandžak. They were attacked with knives and other items, but passersby stopped the conflict and the attackers dispersed and went to the stadium. At the entrance of the north stand, an Ekstremi member heard about the attack, wanting to gain more information and went to a group of Torcida Sandžak supporters, which came from the direction of the city park. On that occasion he was attacked and suffered multiple stab wounds, some of them life-threatening. The majority of the fan group Ekstremi was already gathered on the stands and revolted and burned the banner of Torcida Sandžak. However, after six months, on February 12, 2013, thanks to an intervention by Genç Fenerbahçeliler's leader, the two sides made peace with one another.

In October 2012, the Ekstremi held up the banner “Srce, bubreg, pluća, živela žuta kuća” ("Heart, kidney, lung, long live the Yellow House"), which ridicules the Serb victims in the illegal organ harvesting in Kosovo in 1999, in which were killed numerous Kosovo Serbs captives in a yellow house in Albania, by perpetrators with strong links to the Albanian paramilitary organization UÇK, as a provocation to a team from Belgrade, FK Rad, a team whose ultras, United Force, most share far-right ultra-nationalist views. The incident garnered shocked reactions from media and government officials both in Serbia and in other countries. Just a few days late followed the next provocation, as the Ekstremi placed on their official Facebook page the Serbian children's song “Na kraj sela žuta kuća” ("At the end of the village a yellow house"). Many have enthusiastically escorted the new work, what was seen by the comments below the video clip, but there were also those who sharply condemned the action.
