= Miss Belgium 2010 =

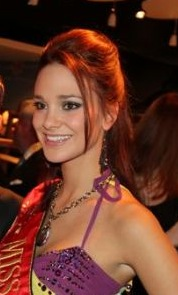
- Cilou Annys, Miss Belgium 2010
- Date: January 10, 2010
- Presenters: Sandrine Corman and Véronique De Kock
- Venue: Casino de Knokke, Belgium
- Broadcaster: RTL-TVI, VIJF
- Entrants: 20
- Placements: Top 12
- Winner: Cilou Annys; West Flanders
- Congeniality: Sophie Pannemans (Liège)

Miss Belgium 2010 the 42nd Miss Belgium pageant, held on January 10, 2010 at Casino de Knokke in Knokke, Belgium.

The winner, Cilou Annys, Miss West Flanders, entered Miss Universe 2010 and Miss World 2010.

== Results ==
Final results	Contestant
Miss Belgium 2010	West Flanders - Cilou Annys
1st Runner-up	Flemish Brabant - Lien Aernouts
2nd Runner-up	Brussels - Binta Telemans
Top 5	Flemish Brabant - Claudia Scheelen; East Flanders - Elke Van Den Borre
Top 10	Brussels - Gohar Avetisyan; Antwerp - Sara De Groof; Limburg - Ewa Merk; Liège - Sophie Pannemans; Liège - Alice Piana
Top 15	Luxembourg - Hélène Czorniak; East Flanders - Chloé Evangelista; Hainaut - Maude Lardinois; Hainaut - Cassandra Palermo; Flemish Brabant - Leen Van Belle

=== Minor titles ===
- Miss Wallonia - Alice Piana (Liège)
- Miss Brussels - Binta Telemans (Brussels)
- Miss Flanders - Elke Van den Borre (East Flanders)

=== Special awards ===
- Miss Congeniality (voted by contestants) - Sophie Pannemans (Liège)

== Candidates ==
Regional Title	Contestant	Age	Height (cm)	Hometown
Miss Hainaut	Cassandra Palermo	22	168	Pâturages
Miss Antwerp	Sarah De Groof	18	167	Malle
Miss Namur	Pina Vatandas	22	168	Namur
Miss Limburg	Ann Alders	20	172	Neerpelt
Miss Walloon Brabant	Maël Vanderplancke	20	169	La Hulpe
1st Runner-up of Miss Limburg	Ewa Merk	20	170	Brée
1st Runner-up of Miss Hainaut	Maude Lardinois	22	170	Morlanwelz
1st Runner-up of Miss Flemish Brabant	Claudia Scheelen	23	173	Tremelo
1st Runner-up of Miss Brussels	Binta Telemans	19	172	Schaerbeek
Crown Card of Miss East Flanders	Nathalie Gailliaert	18	174	Beernem
Miss Brussels	Gohar Avetisyan	20	170	Etterbeek
Miss Flemish Brabant	Lien Aernouts	18	174	Averbode
Wildcard of Miss Brussels	Dahlia Michaux	23	171	Woluwe-Saint-Lambert
Miss East Flanders	Elke Van den Borre	23	175	Grammont
Crown Card of Miss Liège	Alice Piana	23	172	Eupen
1st Runner-up of Miss West Flanders	Chloé Evangelista	21	174	Menen
Miss Luxembourg	Hélène Czorniak	19	176	Fronville
Miss West Flanders	Cilou Annys	18	175	Bruges
Miss Liège	Sophie Pannemans	20	177	Waremme
2nd Runner-up of Miss Flemish Brabant	Leen Van Belle	18	178	Dworp

== Judges ==
The Miss Belgium 2010 final judges were:

- Darline Devos - President of Committee Miss Belgium
- Philippe Delusinne - Administrateur délégué de RTL Belgium
- Alizée Poulicek - Miss Belgium 2008
- Tom Helsen - Singer

== Contestant notes ==
- Gohar Avetisyan, Miss Brussels, is born in Armenia. She has Russian origins on her father's side.
- Hélène Czorniak, Miss Luxembourg, has Ukrainian origins on her father's side.
- Ewa Merk, first runner-up of Miss Limburg, is born in Poland.
- Cassandra Palermo, Miss Hainaut, has German origins on her mother's side and Italian origins on her father's side.
- Binta Telemans, first runner-up of Miss Brussels, has Guinean origins on her mother's side.
- Pina Vatandas, Miss Namur, has Kosovan origins on her father's side and Turkish origins on her mother's side.

== Crossovers ==
Contestants who previously competed at other national beauty pageants:

Miss Halle

- 2006: Flemish Brabant: Leen Van Belle (Winner)

Miss Dworp

- 2008: Flemish Brabant: Leen Van Belle (Winner)

Miss Jeunesse Dorée

- 2013: Hainaut: Maude Lardinois (Winner)

Miss Globe Belgium

- 2014: Antwerp: Sarah De Groof (Winner)

Contestants who previously competed or will be competing at international beauty pageants:

Miss Universe

- 2010: West Flanders: Cilou Annys (Top 15)

Miss World

- 2010: West Flanders: Cilou Annys

Miss International

- 2010: Flemish Brabant: Claudia Scheelen

Miss Grand International

- 2014: Antwerp: Sarah De Groof

Miss Tourism Queen of the Year International 2010

- 2010: Antwerp: Sarah De Groof

Miss Globe International

- 2014: Antwerp: Sarah De Groof
