= Jahrein =

Turkish YouTuber and podcaster (born 1988)

Ahmet Sonuç
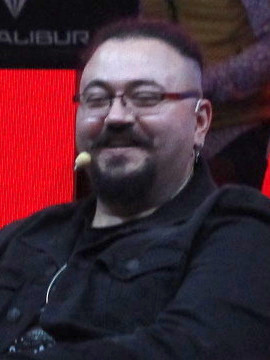
- Sonuç in 2019
- Born: Ahmet Sonuç; 29 November 1988 (age 37); Istanbul
- Occupations: Twitch streamer; YouTuber; Podcaster; Commentator •
- Spouse: Selin Sonuç (m. 2019)

Twitch information
- Channel: Jahrein
- Years active: 2012–present
- Genres: Gaming; Political commentary
- Followers: 1.9 million

YouTube information
- Channel: Jahrein
- Years active: 2012–present
- Genres: Gaming; Political commentary
- Subscribers: 659 thousand
- Views: 199 million
- Last updated: 12 January 2025
- Website: www.jahrein.com

Ahmet Sonuç (born November 29, 1988), known online as Jahrein (Turkish pronunciation: [ˈʒɑh.ɾejn]), is a Turkish YouTuber, online streamer, podcaster and internet celebrity. Although he had started his online career on YouTube, Sonuç gained fame as a Twitch streamer and was one of the first and the oldest Turkish streamers on the platform.

== Biography ==
He was born into a Turkish Cypriot family. Taking his early education in Karabük and moving to Antalya to receive his high school degree, Sonuç claims he studied molecular physics and biochemistry in Leipzig. He stayed in Germany for some years, but left before he graduated. Sonuç then moved to Poland and worked for G2A. He won the best publisher award at the Game Stars award held in 2018. After his marriage with Selin Çakmak on October 5, 2019, he moved back to Antalya, Turkey.

He can speak Turkish, fluent English, German and some Polish.

In May 2021, he interviewed the main opposition party's (Republican People's Party) (CHP) chairman Kemal Kılıçdaroğlu. Later followed by controversial Democracy and Progress Party (DEVA) chairman and former AKP economy & finance minister, Babacan. He expressed his interest in running for parliament as an independent during the 2023 Turkish parliamentary elections. But later following a few months, he said that he gave up on the idea.

Following the Turkish illicit money (money laundering) scandal revealed on Twitch, Sonuç left the platform as a protest in late 2021 and started streaming on Nimo TV in January 2022, later moving to his first ever platform YouTube as of today due to the Nimo platform ceasing its services internationally in early-mid 2022. Between April 2022 and August 2022, he had been broadcasting on YouTube and announced during his stream on August 31, 2022, that he would return to Twitch. However, after the emergence of streaming platform "Kick" he started to stream on it while also remaining on "Twitch" for some sponsored streams.

During June 2022, he announced that he “has stopped taking Turkish politics and politics men seriously” following a chain of events/drama that took place on Twitter with officials within the CHP, and that he will soon legally & officially be forming a joke political party, Meteorite That Kills Dinosaurs Party ("Dinozorları Öldüren Meteor Partisi", abbreviated DİNÖM), dedicated for the younger voter base and “those are who tired of the inefficient opposition”. The party has still not legally been formed, but will be soon submitted to the Ministry of Interior, after their party manifesto is published publicly as said by Jahrein on his livestream.

In March 2023, he became a father, of a boy named Bora Emir (Boromir) Sonuç.

On September 12, 2024, he was arrested on the basis of "obscenity" under Turkish Penal Code 226. That day, the official X account of Antalya province police department made a post detailing the arrests of several people, which included Sonuç. He was released from prison on October 14, after being incarcerated for just over a month.

== Controversies ==
=== Pirate giveaway investigation ===
In January 2021, an administrative and judicial investigation was initiated against Sonuç and many other internet celebrities for allegedly making giveaways through unofficial means, as with new laws doing such giveaways in Turkey requires official permission.

=== “Erzurum” game controversy ===
Jahrein played the video game Erzurum in his live stream on Twitch. After playing the game live, he criticised the game on Steam and returned the game saying "I did not like this game, so I do not want this thing to earn even a little bit". The developer of the game accused Sonuç of being "the lord of toxicity".

== Awards ==
Year	Award	Category	Result	Source
2018	Oyunun Yıldızları (Game Stars Turkey)	Best Male Streamer	Won	
2025	International New Media Forum	Best Political Shift by a Content Creator	Won	
