= Genç Fenerbahçeliler =

Fenerbahçe S.K. ultras group (e. 1998)

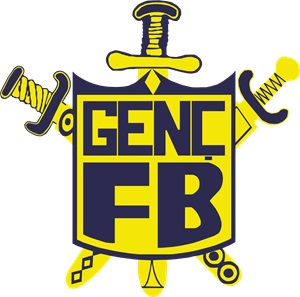
- Nickname: Genç Fenerliler
- Abbreviation: GFB
- Established: 1998
- Type: Supporters' group Ultras group
- Team: Fenerbahçe S.K.
- Motto: Karşılıksız Ölesiye! (Unrequited, To death!)
- Location: Istanbul, Turkey
- Arena: Şükrü Saracoğlu Stadium; Ülker Sports and Event Hall
- Colors: Yellow Navy
- Affiliations: Fenerbahçe S.K. supporters
- Website: gencfb.org

Genç Fenerbahçeliler (English: Young Fenerbahçe Supporters) is a ultras group of Turkish sports club Fenerbahçe S.K.. Founded in 1998 by Sefa Kalya (a.k.a. Sefa Reis).

== History ==
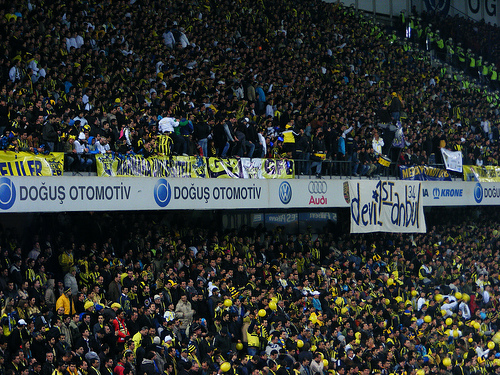
GFB group in 2008.

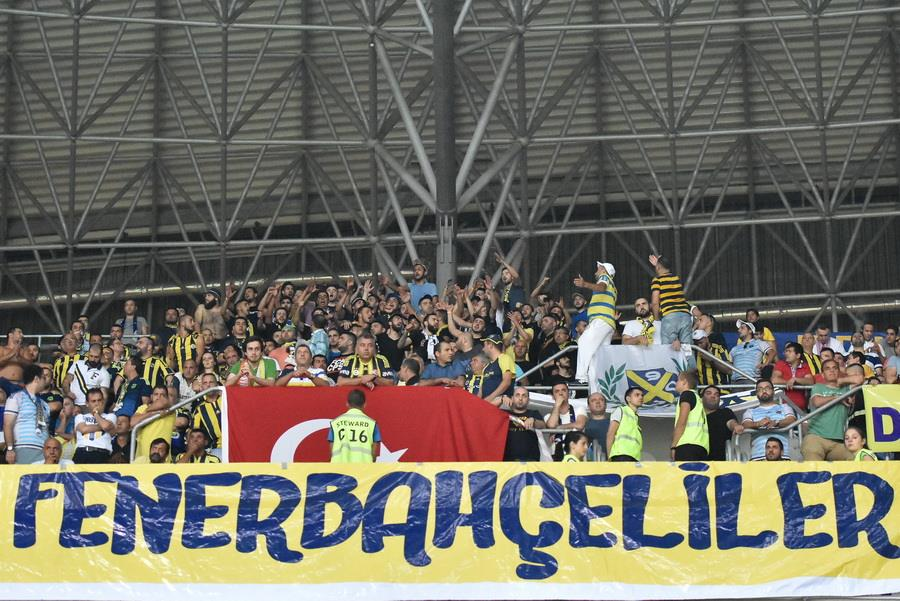
GFB group in 2015

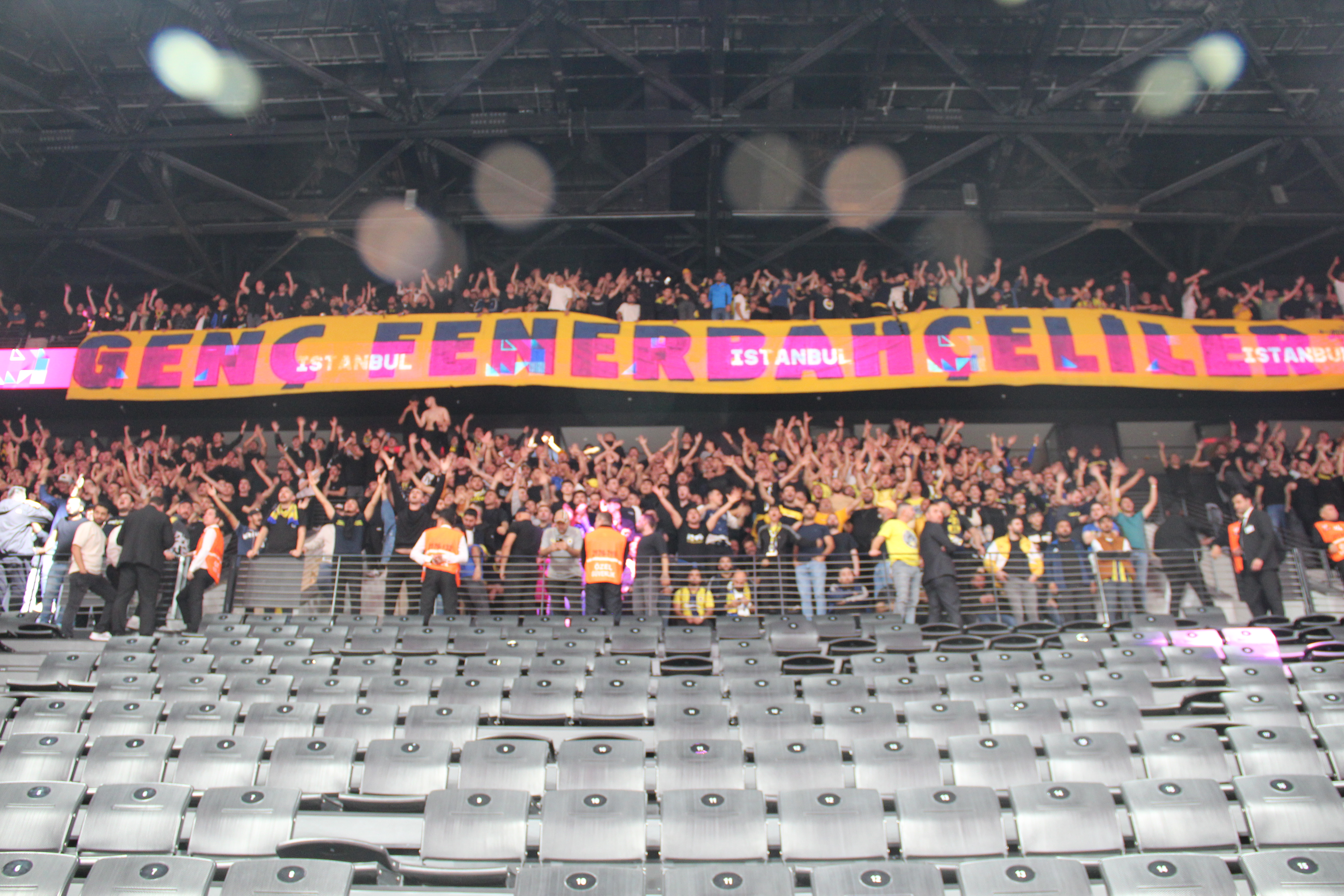
GFB group in 2024

The group that first chose the Marathon tribune as the "Legendary Marathon" was later deployed to the Migros tribune due to problems that arose. However, when the rebuilding of Şükrü Saraçoğlu came to the agenda, the group spread to the stadium. GFB, which was centrally located in Maraton Upper A block from 2009 to 2012, completely moved to Türk Telekom (Okul Açık) tribune in the 2012-2013 season. Although it was officially established in 1998, Young Fenerbahçe fans were organized as a group in the stands in the early 2000s.

GFB is divided into 10 subgroups. These are 1907 Youth (founded in 2000 and joined GFB in 2001), GFB Europe, Lise GFB (Founded by high school students in 2002), Cruel Boys, Uni GFB (Founded by university students in 2001), GFB's Angels (Fenerbahçe women's group), Devils of GFB (established in 2004), Strait Hooligans (established in 2010) and 1907 Ultras (established in 2014)

GFB has members in countries with Turkish diaspora such as; Republic of Northern Cyprus, Austria, Belgium, Bulgaria, Czech Republic, Denmark, England, France, Germany, Kosovo, Macedonia, Moldova, Netherlands, Russia, Sweden, Scotland, Switzerland.

== Relationships with other clubs ==
More recently, in November 2011, Fenerbahçe's GFB created a friendly relationship with Bosnian club FK Novi Pazar's supporters Torcida Sandžak. During a Turkish Süper Lig match against İstanbul Büyükşehir Belediyespor at the Şükrü Saraçoğlu Stadium, the GFB and 1907 Gençlik stand deployed a giant banner reading "Kalbimiz Seninle Novi Pazar" (Novi Pazar, Our Heart Is With You) and after then in Radnicki Kragujevac match of Serbian SuperLiga, Torcida Sandžak stand deployed a giant banner reading "Sancak'ta atıyor, Fenerbahçe'nin kalbi" (Heartbeating of Fenerbahçe in Sandžak). On March 2, 2012, Fenerbahçe's GFB and 1907 Gençlik supporters groups members invited to FK Novi Pazar for Partizan match in Serbian SuperLiga. Thousands Torcida Sandžak member welcomed GFB and 1907 Gençlik's 17 members.

There is an informal friendship and fraternization between the fans of Greek team AEK and Fener. In the 2017 Euroleague final, Fenerbahçe S.K. supporters displayed a banner which read "Same City's Sons"
