= Miss Belgium 2009 =

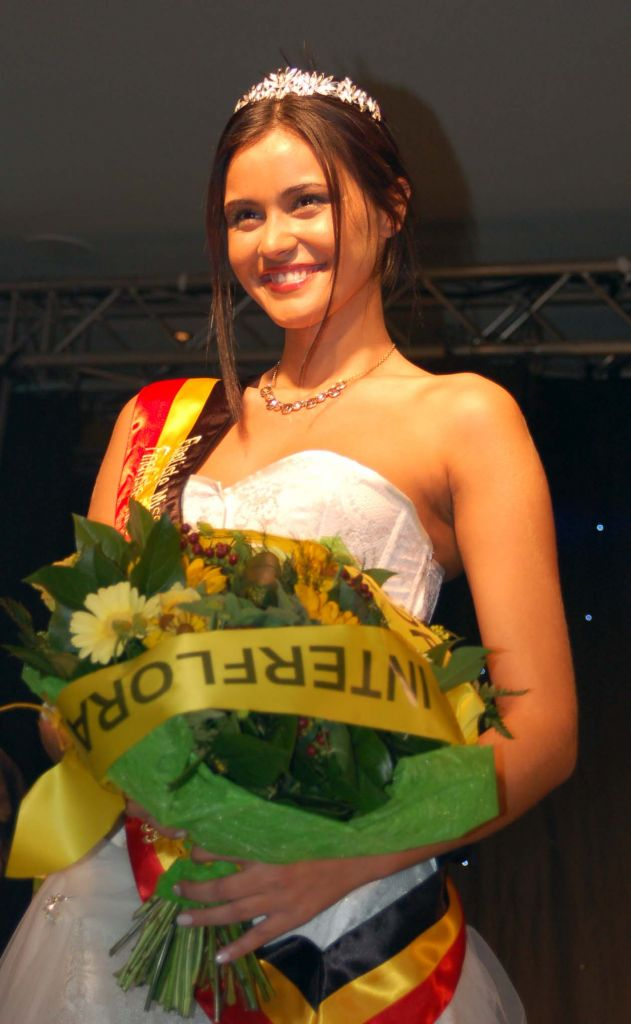
- Zeynep Sever, Miss Belgium 2009
- Date: December 23, 2008
- Presenters: Jean-Michel Zecca, Véronique De Kock
- Venue: Spiroudome, Charleroi, Belgium
- Broadcaster: VT4, RTL-TVI
- Entrants: 20
- Winner: Zeynep Sever; Capital Region
- Congeniality: Hind Ibn-Daifa (Leuven)
- Photogenic: Cassandra d’Ermillio (Hainaut)

Miss Belgium 2009 the 41st Miss Belgium pageant, held on December 23, 2008 in the Spiroudome, Charleroi, Belgium. There were 20 contestants representing provinces and municipalities of Belgium. The winner, Zeynep Sever, entered Miss Universe 2009 and Miss World 2009. The first runner up entered Miss International 2009. The third runner entered Miss Tourism Queen International 2009 and the fourth runner up entered Miss Intercontinental 2009.

== Results ==
Final results	Contestant
Miss Belgium 2009	Capital Region - Zeynep Sever
1st Runner-up	Hainaut - Cassandra d’Ermillio
2nd Runner-up	Hasselt - Michèle Thissen
3rd Runner-up	Limburg - Debbie Vaes
4th Runner-up	Eupen Sankt Vith - Seren Sierack
Semi-finalists	Walloon Brabant - Charlotte Withofs; Ostend - Lauren Vanbiervliet; East Flanders - Stefanie Dehennin; Antwerp - Lindsey Blassieaux; Luxembourg - Alicia Massaux

=== Special awards ===
- Miss Photogenic - Cassandra d’Ermillio (Hainaut)
- Miss Congeniality (voted by contestants) - Hind Ibn-Daifa (Leuven)
- Miss Internet (voted through http://www.missbelgie.be/) - Charlotte Withofs (Walloon Brabant)

== Candidates ==
Represented	Contestant	Age	Height (cm)	Height (ft)	Hometown
Antwerp	Lindsey Blassieaux	22	170	5'6"	Brasschaat
Asse	Isabel Chairez	20	170	5'6"	Asse
Capital Region	Zeynep Sever	18	176	5'9"	Brussels
East Flanders	Stefanie Dehennin	21	183	6'0"	Bavegem
Eupen Sankt Vith	Seren Sierack	20	174	5'8"	Kelmis
Flemish Brabant	Aurélie Van Daelen	20	177	5'10"	Sint-Pieters-Leeuw
Hainaut	Cassandra d’Ermillio	21	175	5'9"	Quaregnon
Hasselt	Michèle Thissen	20	175	5'9"	Hasselt
Uccle	Larissa Vastapane	23	177	5'10"	Brussels
Jette	Yasmine De Borger	21	175	5'9"	Brussels
Jodoigne	Stéphanie Aerts	23	175	5'9"	Jodoigne
Leuven	Hind Ibn-Daifa	19	172	5'7"	Leuven
Limburg	Debbie Vaes	20	177	5'10"	Sint-Truiden
Liège	Elena Gheorghiu	24	174	5'8"	Chaudfontaine
Luxembourg	Alicia Massaux	19	173	5'8"	Arlon
Namur	Marie-Pierre Demoutiez	22	171	5'7"	Namur
Ostend	Lauren Vanbiervliet	20	178	5'10"	Ostend
Uccle	Sophie De Petter	20	181	5'11"	Brussels
Walloon Brabant	Charlotte Withofs	21	172	5'7"	Incourt
West Flanders	Annelore Boutens	20	168	5'5"	Waregem
