= Zeynep Sever =

Belgian-Turkish volleyball player and beauty pageant titleholder

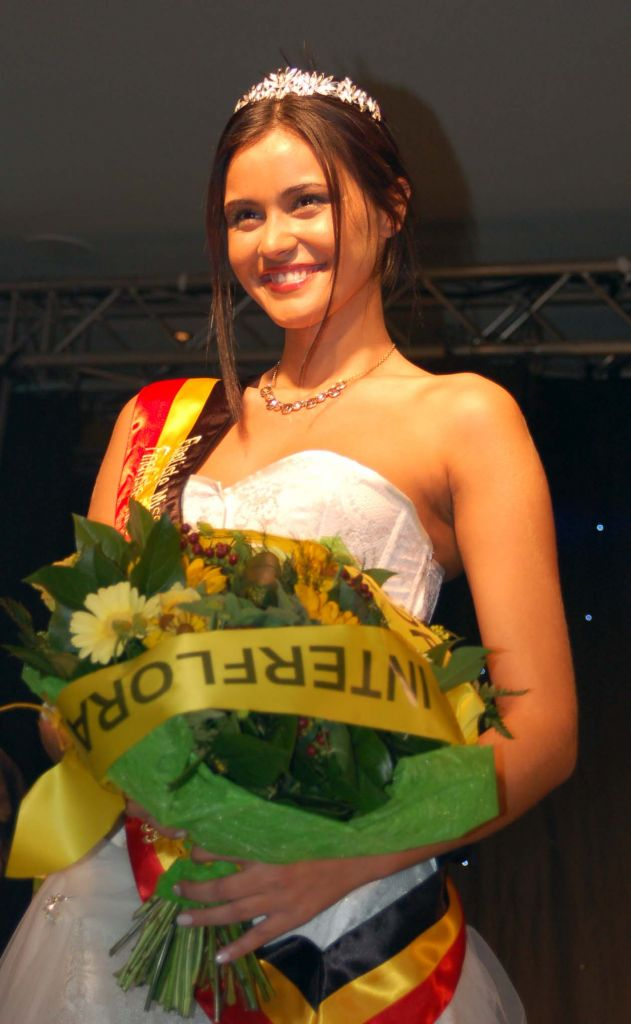
- Born: Zeynep Kübra Sever; 9 July 1989 (age 37); Istanbul, Turkey
- Height: 5 ft 10 in (1.78 m)
- Spouse: Volkan Demirel (m. 2010)
- Children: 3
- Beauty pageant titleholder
- Title: Miss Belgium 2009 (winner)
- Hair color: Black
- Eye color: Brown
- Major competitions: Miss Universe 2009 (Top 15); Miss World 2009 (Unplaced)

Zeynep Kübra Sever Demirel (born 9 July 1989) is a Turkish-Belgian volleyball player and beauty pageant titleholder who was crowned Miss Belgium 2009 and represented Belgium at Miss Universe 2009, where she placed among the Top 15.

== Personal ==
Zeynep Sever married Fenerbahçe S.K.'s goalkeeper, Volkan Demirel on 21 September 2010. They have three daughters together. She also played volleyball for Fenerbahçe.

== Miss Universe 2009 ==
She represented Belgium in the Miss Universe 2009 pageant on 23 August in the Bahamas, where she placed in the top 15. The eventual winner was Stefanía Fernández from Venezuela.

== Miss World 2009 ==
Zeynep also competed at Miss World 2009 but unplaced.

== See also ==
- Turkish women in sports

Preceded by Alizée Poulicek	Miss Belgium; 2009	Succeeded by Cilou Annys
