= Torcida Sandžak =

Football Support group

- Nickname: Torcidaši
- Abbreviation: TS'89
- Founded: 1989
- Type: Supporters' group, Ultras group
- Team: FK Novi Pazar
- Motto: Na braniku grada - nekada i sada! Defending the city - then and now!
- Headquarters: Novi Pazar, Serbia
- Stadium: Novi Pazar City Stadium
- Stand: North
- Coordinates: 43°9′0″N 20°31′0″E
- Colors: Blue and Gold

Torcida Sandžak is a supporter group of the professional football club FK Novi Pazar. Torcida Sandžak is, together with Ultra Azzurro and Ekstremi, the most famous supporter group of FK Novi Pazar.

== History ==
=== 1980s and 90s ===
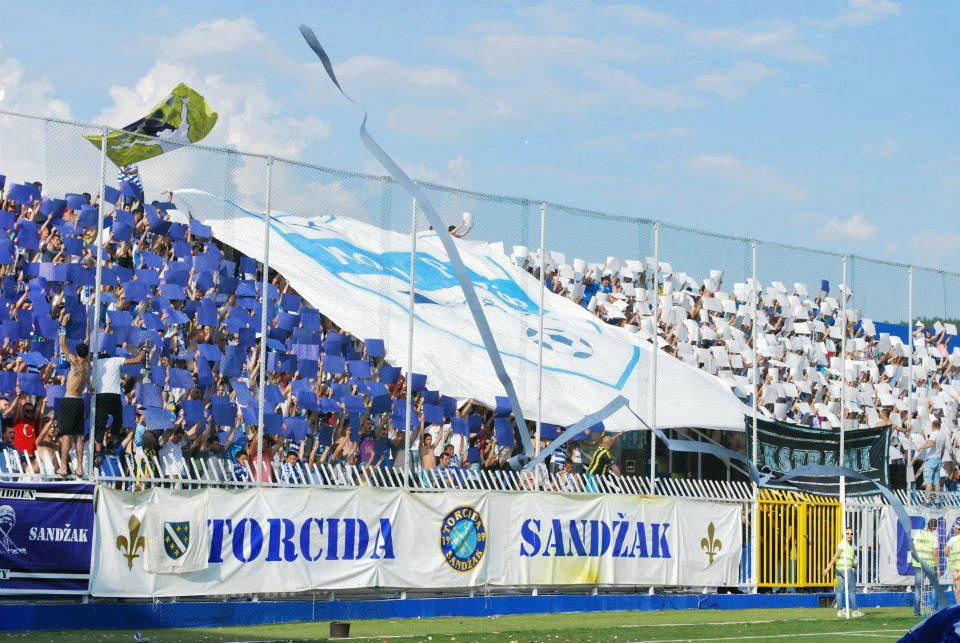
Torcida Sandžak in 2012

In the 1980s, FK Novi Pazar became a regular team in the Yugoslav Second League and its stadium was well attended. The supporters in those days were called the "Pazarci" (Inhabitants of Pazar), or the "Supporters of Novi Pazar". Although they were well organized, they cannot be called real supporters. First organized group of supporters in Novi Pazar started in 1984, under the name "Blue Hunters". FK Novi Pazar was knocking on Yugoslav First League's door and these supporters traveled with the club around the country. While many organized groups were forming all over the country in the 1980s, a few more were formed in Novi Pazar. Fighters in 1987, Pirates, Eagles, and Blue Girls in 1988, and Blue Warriors in 1989.

The unification of all supporter groups happened in 1989 under the name Torcida Sandžak. The name "Torcida", which has a similar meaning as the Ultras of Europe. The name "Sandžak" represents a historical region in Serbia and Montenegro, today populated mostly by Bosniaks. It derives its name from the Sanjak of Novi Pazar, a former Ottoman administrative district that existed until the Balkan Wars of 1912. Novi Pazar was the capital of the district and therefore "Sandžak" was taken to represent the city and the region. In the 1990s, another group was founded. In 1998, a group was formed under the name of Ultra Azzurro.

=== 2000s and 10s ===
Torcida Sandžak visited Belgrade, Niš, Novi Sad, Kragujevac, and other cities around the country numerous times with the club. It's hard to say how many members there are, but they are not only located in the city of Novi Pazar. There are members in the cities of Tutin, Sjenica, Priboj, Prijepolje, and in Rožaje in Montenegro. There is a large group of its supporters among the diaspora as well. After six years of co-existence of the two supporter groups, in 2004, a new supporter group Ekstremi was formed. They quickly tried to incorporate members of both Torcida Sandžak and Ultra Azzurro into their group, which caused problems as most members of both groups refused to become a part of the new group. This completely separated them and left the sides bitter. On 13 August 2012, just before the football match between FK Novi Pazar and Radnički Niš, it came to a battle between the two local groups Torcida Sandžak and the Ekstremi. The clash occurred at the time when the members of Torcida Sandžak wanted to put a banner on the north stand of the Novi Pazar City Stadium. Their rivals, the Ekstremi, set the banner on fire and then the conflict broke out. A member of the fan group Ekstremi was stabbed with a knife in the chest and suffered serious life-threatening injuries. After the version of the Ekstremi, just before the match, at the entrance to the city park, one member was attacked by rival supporters Torcida Sandžak. They were attacked with knives and other items, but the passersby stop the conflict and the attackers dispersed and went to the stadium. At the entrance of the north stand, an Ekstremi member heard about the attack, wanting to gain more information and went to a group of Torcida Sandžak supporters, which came from the direction of the city park. On that occasion he was attacked and suffered multiple stab wounds, some of them life-threatening. The majority of the fan group Ekstremi was already gathered on the stands and revolted and burned the banner of Torcida Sandžak. However, after six months, on February 12, 2013, thanks to an intervention by Genç Fenerbahçeliler's leader, the two sides made peace with one another.

== Relationships with other supporter groups ==
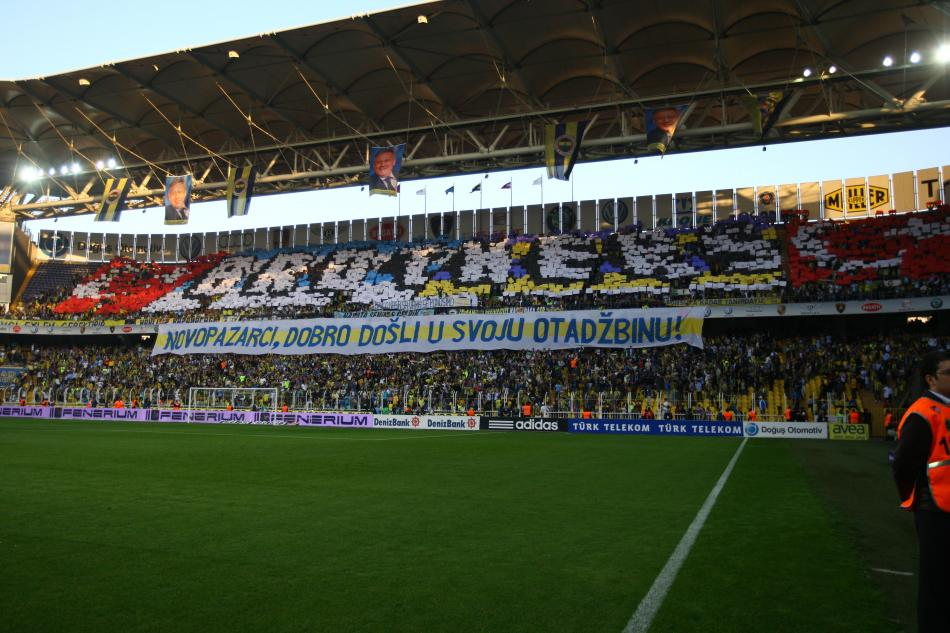
Genç Fenerbahçeliler shows friendship in 2012

In November 2011, Torcida Sandžak started a friendly relationship with Fenerbahçe Istanbul's fan group Genç Fenerbahçeliler, abbreviated Genç FB. During a home game against Istanbul BB, the Genç FB and 1907 Gençlik stand deployed a giant banner reading "Kalbimiz Seninle Novi Pazar", which means "Novi Pazar, our heart is with you". Then, in a Serbian SuperLiga game against Radnicki Kragujevac, Torcida Sandžak stand deployed a giant banner reading "Sancak'ta atıyor, Fenerbahçe'nin kalbi", which means "Heart beats for Fenerbahçe in Sandžak". On March 2, 2012, Fenerbahçe's Genç FB and 1907 Gençlik supporter groups' members were invited to Novi Pazar for the match between against Partizan Belgrade. Thousands of Torcida Sandžak members welcomed Genç FB and 1907 Gençlik's 17 members. On April 7, 2012, about 50 FK Novi Pazar supporters drove to Istanbul for the match Fenerbahçe against Antalyaspor. A few hundred Fenerbahce fans welcomed the FK Novi Pazar fans during their arrival in Istanbul. This was further solidifed with the founding of 'Sandzakfener' organization in 2023.
