= Ogene discography =

This is the discography for Dutch pop musical group Ogene.

== Studio albums ==
List of albums, with selected chart positions
Title	Details	Peak chart positions		Ref.
Title	Details	NLD	BEL (FL)	Ref.
As Lisa, Amy & Shelley
300%	Released: 2 June 2008; Format: Digital download, CD; Label: Dino Music, EMI	26	—	
Sweet 16	Released: 16 October 2011; Format: Digital download, CD; Label: Dino Music	45	—	
As Ogene
We Got This	Released: 30 September 2016; Format: Digital download, CD; Label: BMG	1	86	
Straight to You	Released: 1 October 2019; Format: Digital download, CD; Label: Cornelis Music	8	—	
Garden of Hera	Released: 14 March 2025; Format: Digital download; Label: Self-released	—	—	

== Live albums ==
Title	Details
A Magical Christmas In Concert	Released: 2019; Format: Digital download; Label: Cornelis Music
Three Times a Lady (Live in Concert)	Released: 18 October 2019; Format: Digital download, DVD; Label: Cornelis Music

== Extended plays ==
Title	Details
As Lisa, Amy & Shelley
The Power Of Christmas	Released: 2008; Format: Digital download; Label: Universal Music
As Ogene
Home Isolation	Released: 7 April 2020; Format: Digital download; Label: Cornelis Music
Home Isolation Part 2	Released: 14 May 2020; Format: Digital download; Label: Cornelis Music
Home Isolation Part 3	Released: 18 June 2020; Format: Digital download; Label: Cornelis Music

== Singles ==
=== As lead artist ===
List of singles, with selected chart positions
Title	Year	Peak chart positions			Album	Ref.
Title	Year	NLD (100)	NLD (40)	BEL (FL)	Album	Ref.
As Lisa, Amy & Shelley
"Adem in, adem uit"	2007	55	—	—	300%	
"Zet 'm op!"	2008	60	—	—	300%	
"Strand"	2008	—	—	—	300%	
"The Power of Christmas"	2008	98	—	—	The Power Of Christmas	
"'t Is zomer"	2009	—	—	—	Non-album singles	
"Magie"	2009	—	—	—	Non-album singles	
"Fout ventje"	2010	—	—	—	Sweet 16	
"Niemand"	2011	—	—	—	Sweet 16	
"Dicht bij jou"	2011	—	—	—	Sweet 16	
"Op de radio"	2012	—	—	—	Sweet 16	
"Al mijn vrienden"	2013	—	—	—	Non-album singles	
"Diep in de nacht"	2013	—	—	—	Non-album singles	
As Ogene						
"Magic" (Note: "Magic" is included on the deluxe edition of We Got This)	2014	3	20	—	We Got This	
"Cold"	2015	70	—	—	Non-album singles	
"Wings to Fly"	2015	100	—	—	Non-album singles	
"Take the Money and Run"	2016	— (Note: "Take the Money and Run" did not enter the Singles Top 100, but peaked at number 30 on the Single Tip chart.)	—	—	We Got This	
"Clown" (Note: "Clown" is included on the deluxe edition of We Got This)	2016	64	—	—	We Got This	
"Loved You First"	2016	—	—	—	We Got This	
"Lights and Shadows" (Note: "Lights and Shadows" is included on the deluxe edition of We Got This)	2017	14	33	79	We Got This	
"But I Do"	2017	127	—	— (Note: "But I Do" did not enter the Ultratop Singles chart, but peaked on the Ultratip Bubbling Under chart.)	Non-album single	
"Clouds Across The Sun"	2018	—	—	— (Note: "Clouds Across The Sun" did not enter the Ultratop Singles chart, but peaked on the Ultratip Bubbling Under chart.)	Straight to You	
"Alles is nog hier"	2018	—	—	—	Non-album single	
"Starve"	2019	—	—	—	Straight To You	
"First Clash Lovers"	2019	—	—	—	Straight To You	
"Kinda Wanna"	2020	—	—	—	Straight To You	
"Bohemian Rhapsody"	2020	—	—	—	Home Isolation	
"Handgeschreven kus"	2020	—	—	—	Non-album singles	
"Dat ben jij"	2021	—	—	—	Non-album singles	
"Toen ik je zag"	2021	—	—	—	Non-album singles	
"Coming Home with Santa"	2021	—	—	—	Non-album singles	
"Christmas on My Doorstep"	2021	—	—	—	Non-album singles	
"Veel te snel"	2022	—	—	—	Non-album singles	
"Love Letter"	2022	—	—	—	Non-album singles	
"Koning liefde"	2023	—	—	—	Non-album singles	
"Phenomenon"	2024	—	—	—	Garden of Hera	
"Alive"	2024	—	—	—	Garden of Hera	
"Illusion"	2025	—	—	—	Garden of Hera	
"Golden Hour"	2025	—	—	—	Garden of Hera	
"—" denotes a single that did not chart or was not released.

=== As featured artist ===
Title	Year	Album	Ref.
"Ik wil jou" (Young Smoothies featuring Lisa, Amy & Shelley)	2013	Non-album single	

== Promotional singles ==
List of singles, with selected chart positions
Title	Year	Peak chart positions	Album	Ref.
Title	Year	NLD (100)	Album	Ref.
"Emotion"	2014	37	Non-album singles	
"I See Fire" (Gabriella Massa and Ogene)	2014	109	Non-album singles	
"Clash 8" (Abigail Martina and Ogene)	2014	—	Non-album singles	
"Buttons"	2014	—	Non-album singles	
"Change Will Come"	2014	19	Non-album singles	
"Hold On"	2014	86	Non-album singles	
"—" denotes a single that did not chart or was not released.
