= Marthe De Pillecyn =

Belgian singer, actress, and television presenter

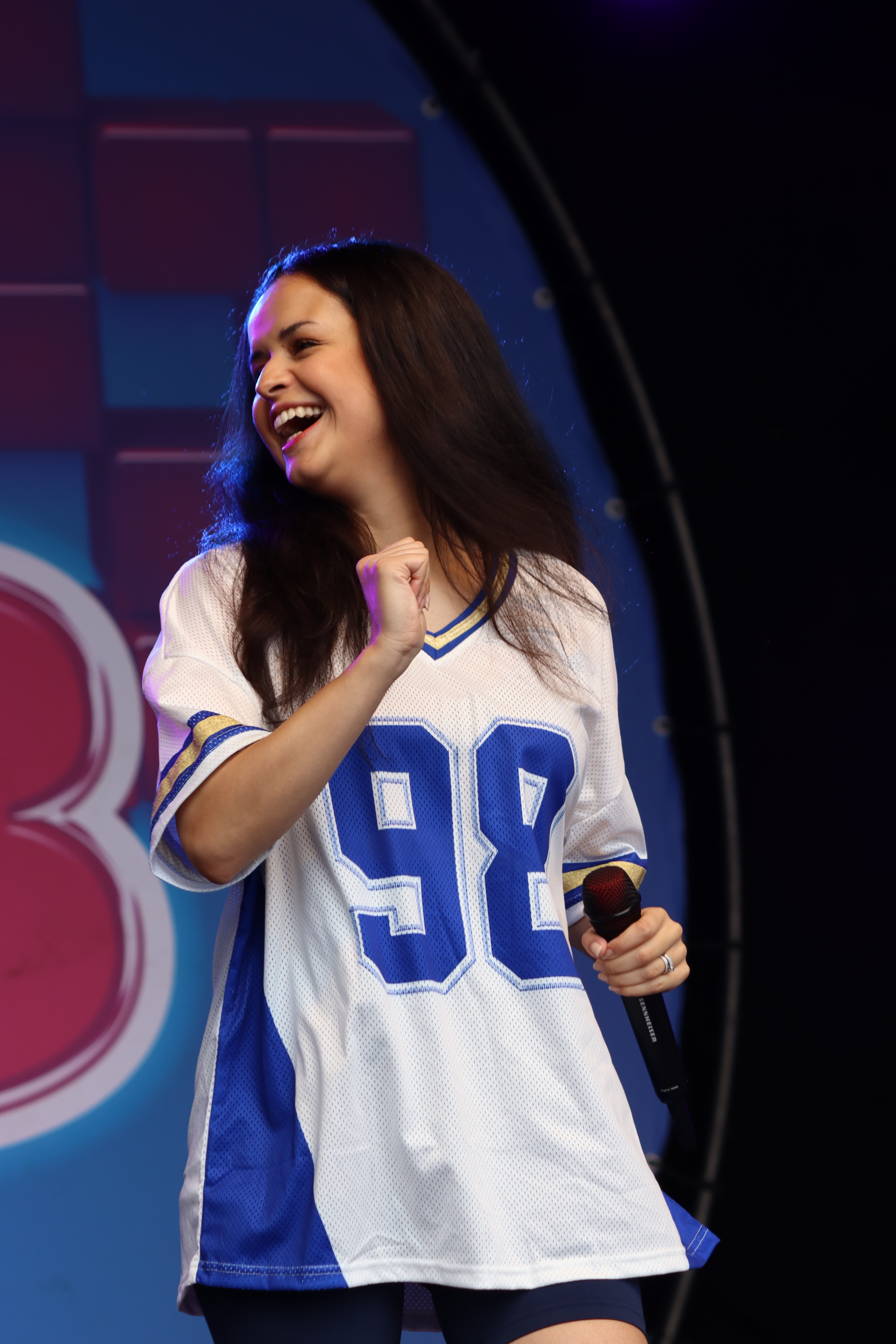
- De Pillecyn during a K3 performance
- Born: Marthe De Pillecyn; 16 July 1996 (age 30); Duffel, Belgium
- Other name: The brunette of K3
- Education: Sint-Norbertus Institute
- Occupations: Singer; (musical)actress; television personality
- Years active: 2015–present
- Notable work: K3 discography
- Spouse: Sinerjey Meyfroodt (m. 2022)
- Children: 2
- Musical career
- Genre: Pop
- Instruments: Vocals
- Label: Studio 100
- Member of: K3
- Website: www.k3.be

Signature
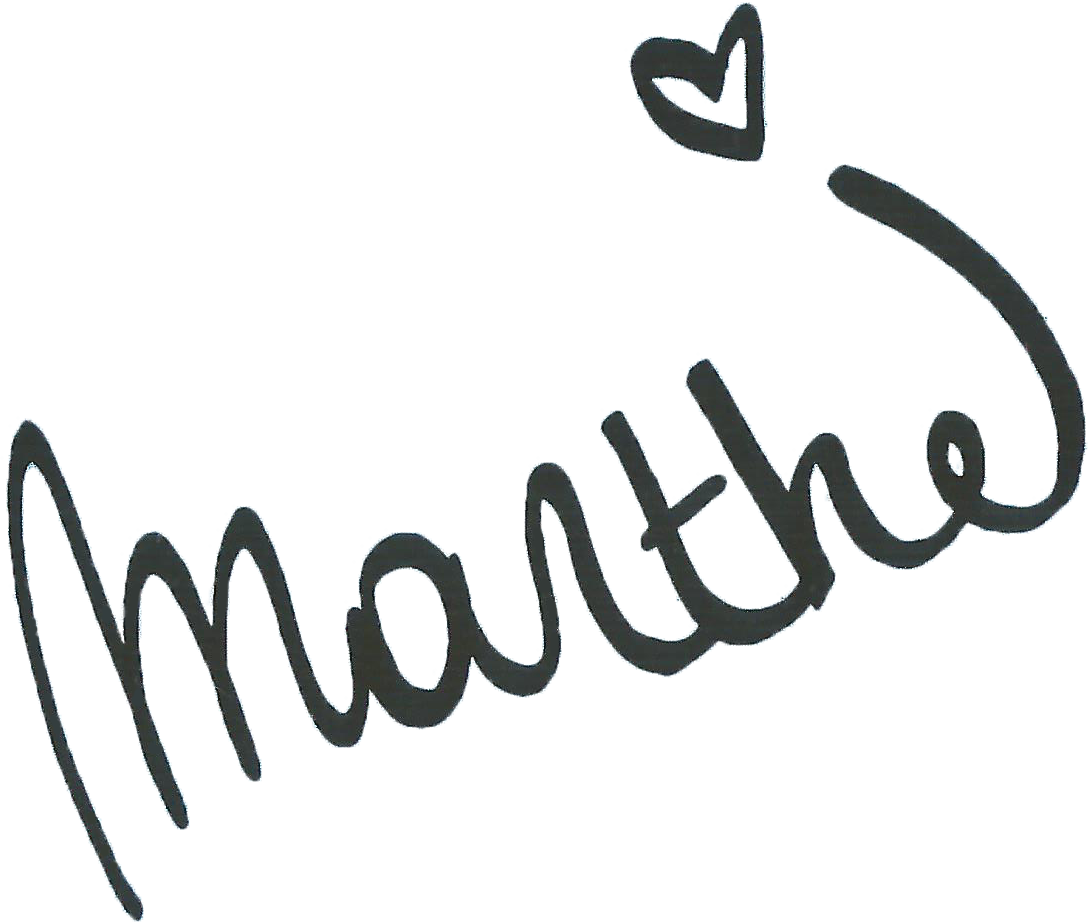

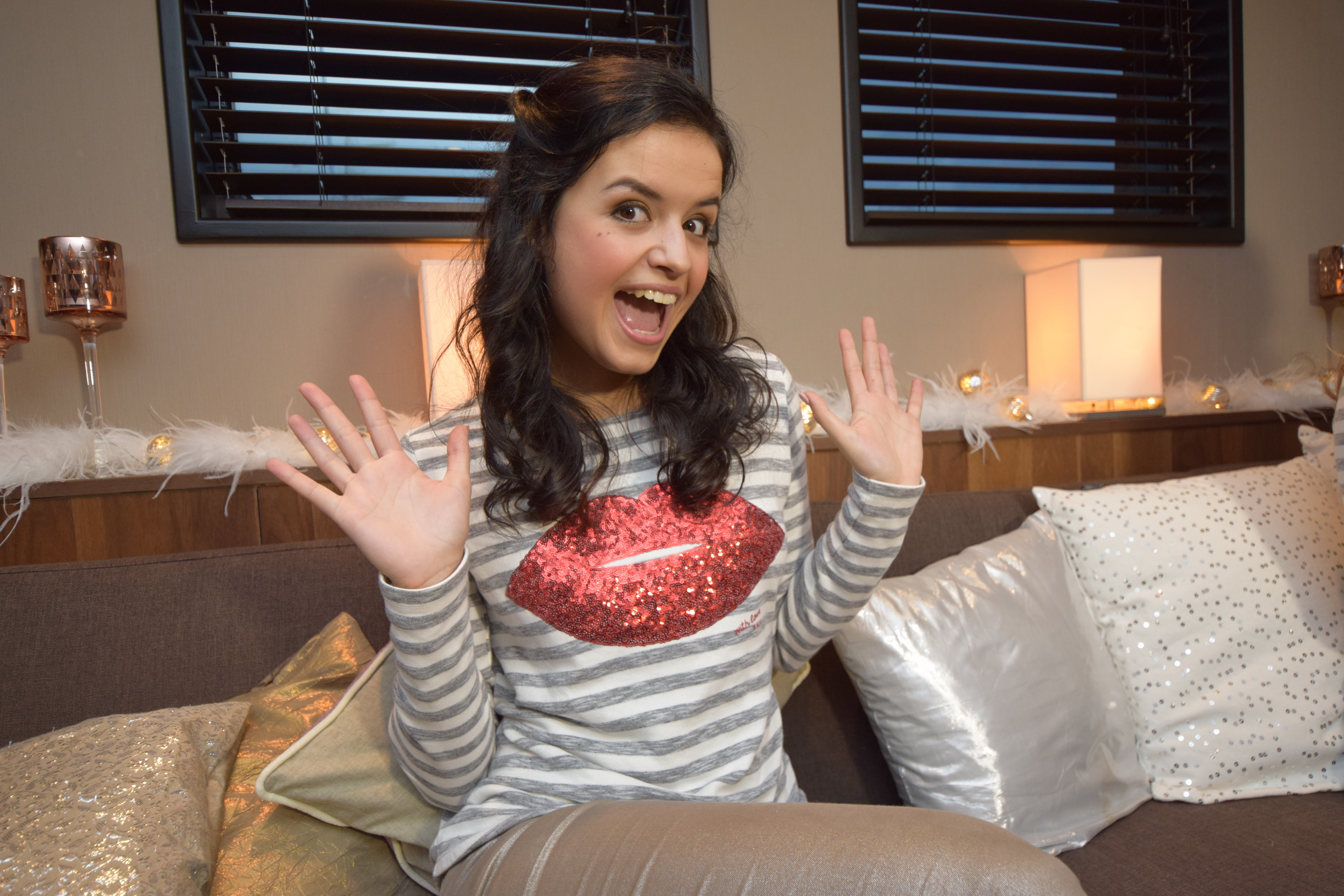
De Pillecyn in 2015

Marthe De Pillecyn (born 16 July 1996) is a Belgian singer, actor, and television presenter. Since 2015 she has been a member of the Belgian–Dutch girl group K3.

== Early life ==
De Pillecyn has been active as the singer of the group K3 since 2015 and was the youngest member until the end of 2021. She studied at the Catholic Sint-Norbertus Institute in Duffel, but interrupted her studies to be part of the new K3. In addition, she has been part of the Studio 100 choir since the age of 10, with whom she has performed among others at the Antwerp Sportpaleis and the Amsterdam ArenA. She has already sung in the background on several occasions during K3 performances. She has also released a number of covers on her own YouTube channel.

== Career ==
From 2009, De Pillecyn became a permanent background singer of De Grote Sinterklaasshow, an annual show in the Antwerp Sportpaleis in celebration of Sinterklaas. In 2013, De Pillecyn participated in the television show Belgium's Got Talent as a member of the Young Artist Academy (the choir of Studio 100), a group made up of 53 singers aged 9 to 25. She also had a role in the soap Galaxy Park. A year later she had the role of a student of the music class in the series Ghost Rockers.

In 2015, she participated in the television show K3 Zoekt K3 (K3 seeks K3), intended to find three new members for the pop group K3 to take over from Karen Damen, Kristel Verbeke and Josje Huisman. De Pillecyn was finally selected on 6 November 2015 and formed the new group with Klaasje Meijer and Hanne Verbruggen.

Begin 2021, De Pillecyn covered the single Try by Colbie Caillat together with her brother. Which resulted the production of a music video and being broadcast by Qmusic.

After Meijer announced in February 2021 that she would be leaving K3, De Pillecyn and Verbruggen started looking for a new colleague in the K2 zoekt K3 program in the same year. At the end of November 2021, Julia Boschman won the contest and completed the girl group again.

In December 2024, De Pillecyn was a candidate in the program Bestemming X-mas.

== Personal life ==
De Pillecyn had been in a relationship for several years with Viktor Verhulst, the son of boss Gert Verhulst. In November 2017, they were voted "Favorite Couple of Flanders". They broke up in 2018. Since 2022, De Pillecyn has been married to Studio 100 choreographer Sinerjey Meyfroodt, with whom she has been in a relationship since 2019. Together they also run a dance studio. In early 2025, they became parents for the first time, and in early 2026 Marthe announced she was expecting a second child.

== Discography ==
Studio albums
- 2015: 10.000 Luchtballonnen
- 2016: Ushuaia
- 2017: Love Cruise
- 2018: Roller Disco
- 2019: Dromen
- 2020: Dans van de farao
- 2021: Waterval
- 2022: Vleugels
- 2024: Het lied van de zeemeermin

== Filmography ==
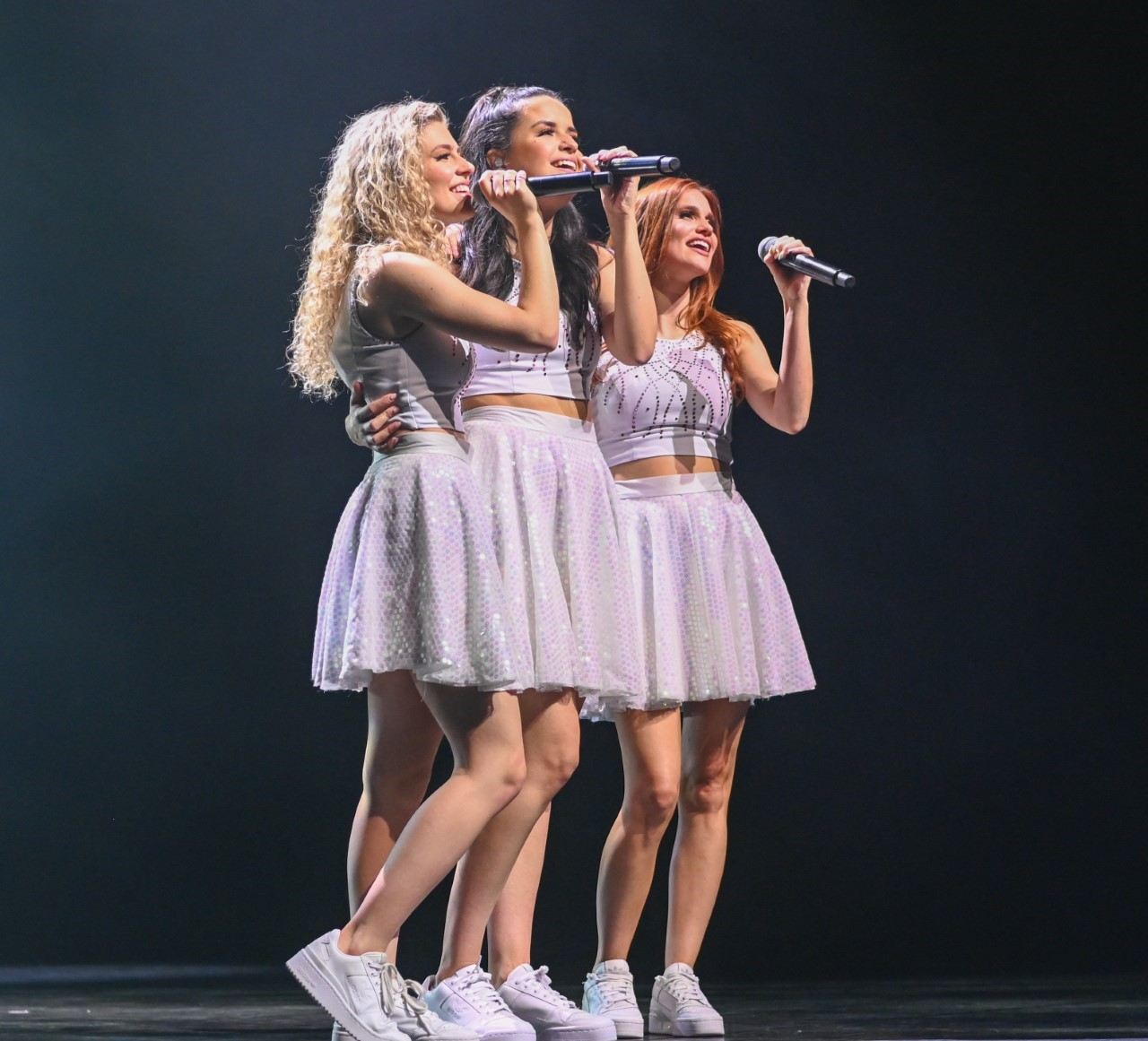
Marthe De Pillecyn with Julia Boschman and Hanne Verbruggen

Film
Year	Title	Role	Notes
2017	K3 Love Cruise	Marthe	K3 theater movies, main role
2020	K3 Dans van de Farao	Marthe	K3 theater movies, main role
2024	K3 en Het Lied van de Zeemeermin	Marthe	K3 theater movies, main role
Television
Year	Title	Role	Notes
2013	Belgium's Got Talent	Candidate	Part of the group Young Artist Academy
2013	Galaxy Park	Extra	
2014	Ghost Rockers	Extra	
2015	K3 zoekt K3	Candidate	Winner together with Hanne Verbruggen and Klaasje Meijer
2015–	K3 - Muziekclips	Herself	
2015	Welkom bij K3	Herself	
2015	Iedereen beroemd	Herself	
2016	Dit is K3	Herself	
2016	Wij zijn K3	Herself	
2016	Is er Wifi in Tahiti?	Candidate	Together with Hanne Verbruggen and Klaasje Meijer
2016	De avonturen van K3	Marthe	Voice
2016–2017	Iedereen K3	Presenter	
2016–2017	K3 Dansstudio	Presenter	
2016	2 Meisjes op het Strand	Presenter	
2016–2017	Radio 2 Zomerhit	Candidate	Together with Hanne Verbruggen and Klaasje Meijer
2016	Mijn Pop-uprestaurant	Herself	
2016–2018	Het dagboek van K3	Herself	
2017	Ligt er Flan op de Mont Blanc?	Candidate	Together with Hanne Verbruggen and Klaasje Meijer
2017–	K3 Vlogt	Herself	
2017	Tegen de Sterren op	Herself	
2017	Camping Karen & James	Herself	
2017	Overal K3	Herself	
2017	Wedden dat ik het kan	Herself	
2017	Knoop Gala	Herself	
2018	De Wensboom	Herself	
2018	De tafel van K3	Presenter	
2018–2020	The Voice Kids	Judge/coach	Together with Hanne Verbruggen, Klaasje Meijer (2018–2020) and Julia Boschman (2022)
2018	Zet 'm op!	Herself	
2018–2020	K3 Roller Disco	Marthe	
2019	K3 Dromen	Marthie	
2020	Het Rad	Herself	
2020, 2022	Code van Coppens	Candidate	Together with Hanne Verbruggen and Julia Boschman
2020	K3 Roller Disco Club	Presenter	
2021	K2 zoekt K3	Herself	
2021	K2 zoekt mee	Herself	
2021	K3, een nieuw begin	Herself	
2022	Marble Mania	Candidate	Together with Hanne Verbruggen and Julia Boschman
2022	K3, een nieuwe start	Herself	
2022, 2024	Zin in Zappelin	Herself	
2022	K3 Vriendenboek	Herself	
2022	K3, één jaar later	Herself	
2022	The Big Show	Herself	
2023–2024	Liefde voor muziek	Candidate	Together with Hanne Verbruggen and Julia Boschman
2023	Team K3	Herself	
2023	Een terugblik op 25 jaar K3	Herself	
2024	Bestemming X-mas	Candidate	
2025	Hallo Kroket!	Herself	
2025	The Masked Singer	Guest panelist	Together with Hanne Verbruggen and Julia Boschman
2026	James & co	Herself	
