= Hanne Verbruggen (singer) =

Belgian singer, actress, and television presenter

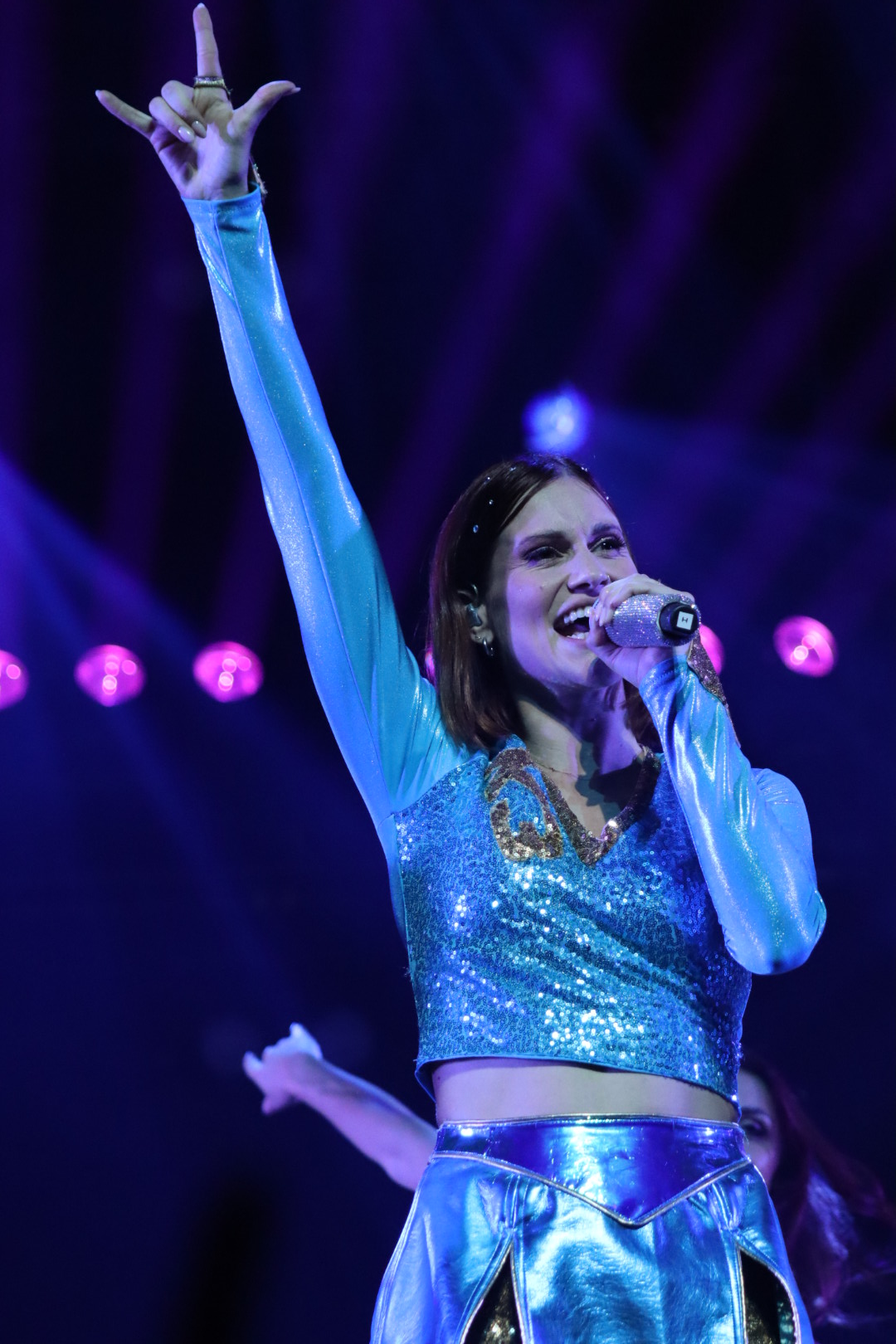
- Verbruggen during a K3 show
- Born: Hanne Stefanie Harry Verbruggen; 3 March 1994 (age 32); Mechelen, Belgium
- Other name: The redhead of K3
- Education: Artesis Plantijn University College of Antwerp
- Occupations: Singer; (musical)actress; television personality
- Years active: 2015–present
- Notable work: K3 discography
- Spouse: Jorn Sarens (m. 2020)
- Children: 1
- Musical career
- Genres: Pop
- Instruments: Vocals
- Label: Studio 100
- Member of: K3
- Website: www.k3.be

Signature
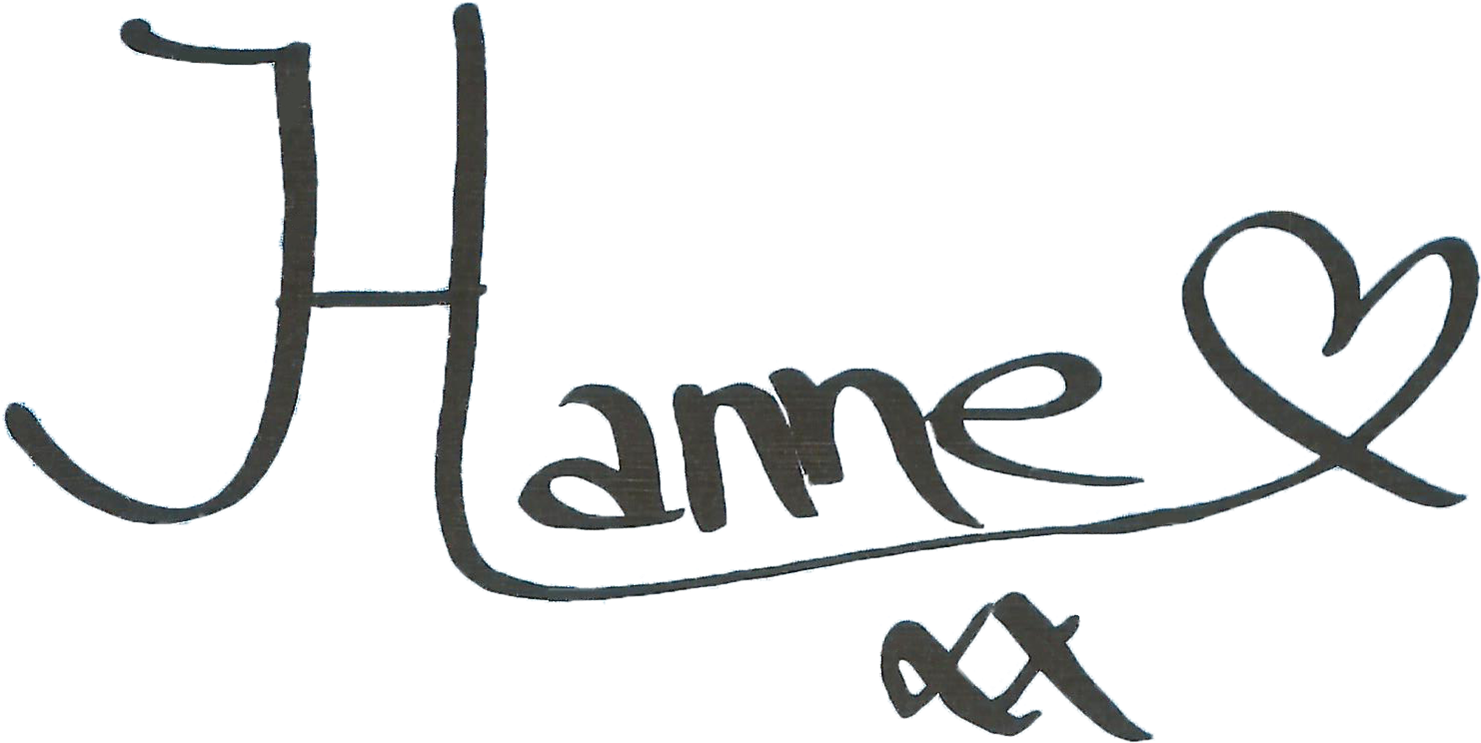

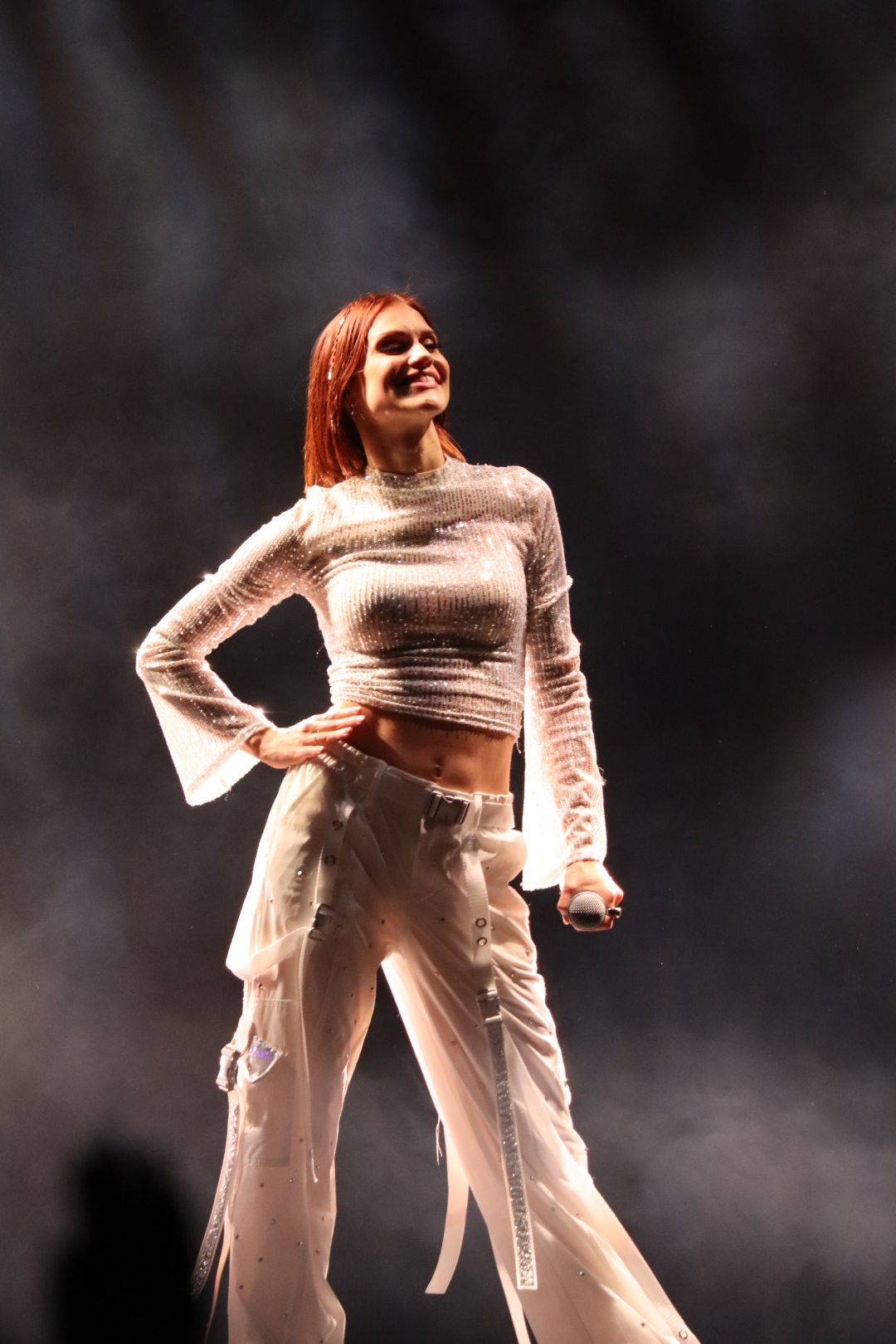
Verbruggen in 2025

Hanne Stefanie Harry Verbruggen (born 3 March 1994) is a Belgian singer, actor, and television presenter. Since 2015 she has been a member of the Belgian–Dutch girl group K3.

== Early life ==
Verbruggen studied communication management at the Artesis Plantijn University College of Antwerp. She was also a leader of a scouting Akabe group. She stopped her studies when she was allowed to be part of the new K3.

== Career ==
In autumn 2015 Verbruggen was one of the winners of the TV program K3 Zoekt K3 (K3 seeks K3), which was broadcast on SBS6 and VTM. Together with Marthe De Pillecyn and Klaasje Meijer, she formed the new line-up of the girl group K3, where she herself became the successor to Karen Damen.

In September 2021 Verbruggen and De Pillecyn looked for a new K3 member in the television program K2 zoekt K3 (K2 seeks K3), after Meijer announced her departure from the group earlier that year. This competition was ultimately won by Julia Boschman on 27 November 2021.

== Personal life ==
Verbruggen married police inspector Jorn Sarens on 29 August 2020. On 14 November 2022, she gave birth to a son.

== Discography ==
Studio albums
- 2015: 10.000 Luchtballonnen
- 2016: Ushuaia
- 2017: Love Cruise
- 2018: Roller Disco
- 2019: Dromen
- 2020: Dans van de farao
- 2021: Waterval
- 2022: Vleugels
- 2024: Het lied van de zeemeermin

== Filmography ==
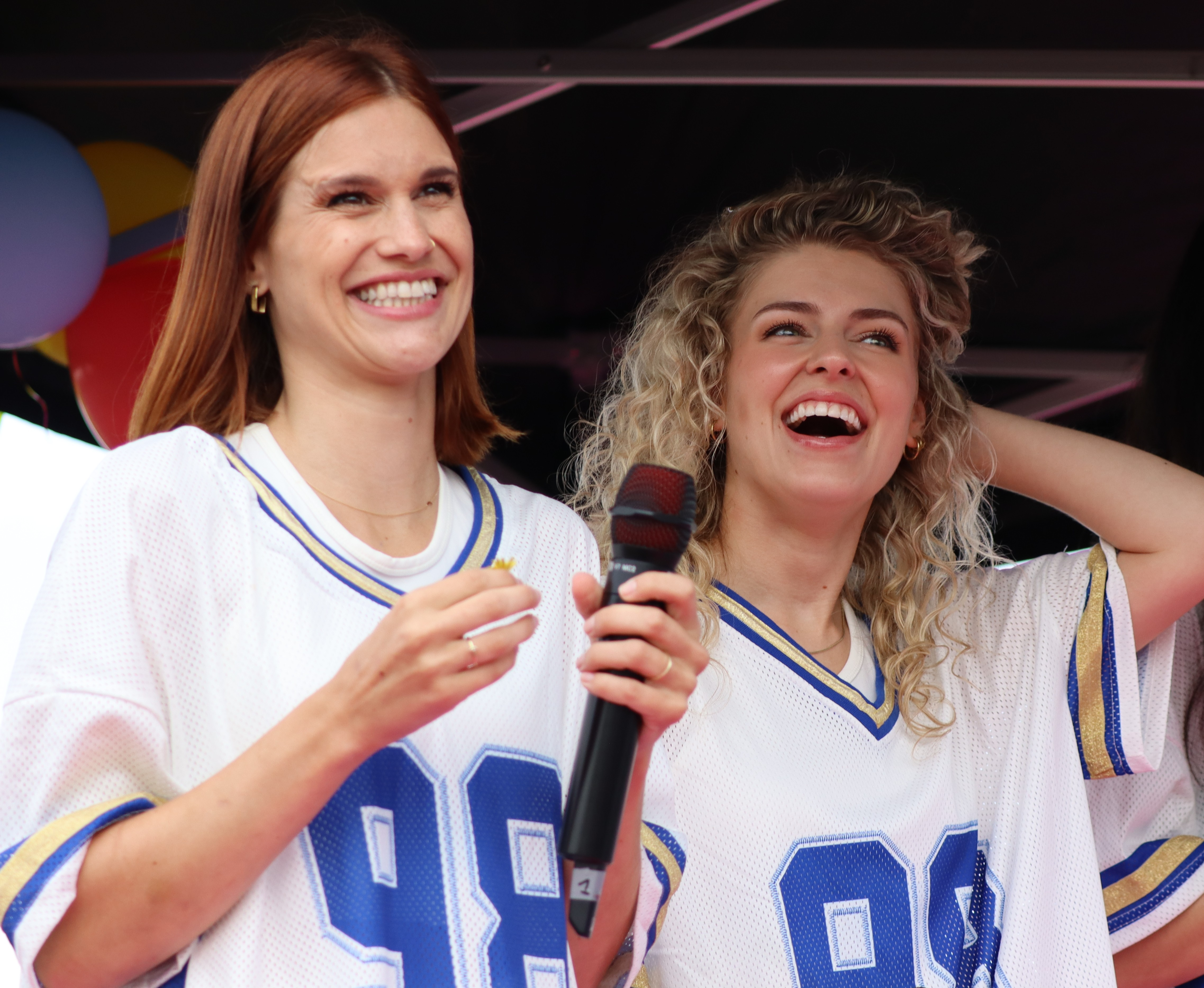
Hanne Verbruggen and fellow K3 member Julia Boschman

Film
Year	Title	Role	Notes
2017	K3 Love Cruise	Hanne	K3 theater movies, main role
2020	K3 Dans van de Farao	Hanne	K3 theater movies, main role
2024	K3 en Het Lied van de Zeemeermin	Hanne	K3 theater movies, main role
Television
Year	Title	Role	Notes
2015	K3 zoekt K3	Candidate	Winner together with Klaasje Meijer and Marthe De Pillecyn
2015–	K3 - Muziekclips	Herself	
2015	Welkom bij K3	Herself	
2015	Iedereen beroemd	Herself	
2016	Dit is K3	Herself	
2016	Wij zijn K3	Herself	
2016	Is er Wifi in Tahiti?	Candidate	Together with Klaasje Meijer and Marthe De Pillecyn
2016	De avonturen van K3	Hanne	Voice
2016–2017	Iedereen K3	Presenter	
2016–2017	K3 Dansstudio	Presenter	
2016	2 Meisjes op het Strand	Presenter	
2016–2017	Radio 2 Zomerhit	Candidate	Together with Klaasje Meijer and Marthe De Pillecyn
2016	Mijn Pop-uprestaurant	Herself	
2016–2018	Het dagboek van K3	Herself	
2017	Ligt er Flan op de Mont Blanc?	Candidate	Together with Klaasje Meijer and Marthe De Pillecyn
2017–	K3 Vlogt	Herself	
2017	Tegen de Sterren op	Herself	
2017	Camping Karen & James	Herself	
2017	Overal K3	Herself	
2017	Wedden dat ik het kan	Herself	
2017	Knoop Gala	Herself	
2018	De Wensboom	Herself	
2018	De tafel van K3	Presenter	
2018–2020	The Voice Kids	Judge/coach	Together with Marthe De Pillecyn, Klaasje Meijer (2018–2020) and Julia Boschman (2022)
2018	Zet 'm op!	Herself	
2018–2020	K3 Roller Disco	Hanne	
2019	K3 Dromen	Hannie	
2020	Het Rad	Herself	
2020, 2022	Code van Coppens	Candidate	Together with Klaasje Meijer and Marthe De Pillecyn
2020	K3 Roller Disco Club	Presenter	
2021	K2 zoekt K3	Herself	
2021	K2 zoekt mee	Herself	
2021	K3, een nieuw begin	Herself	
2022	Marble Mania	Candidate	Together with Marthe De Pillecyn and Julia Boschman
2022	K3, een nieuwe start	Herself	
2022, 2024	Zin in Zappelin	Herself	
2022	K3 Vriendenboek	Herself	
2022	K3, één jaar later	Herself	
2022	The Big Show	Herself	
2023–2024	Liefde voor muziek	Candidate	Together with Marthe De Pillecyn and Julia Boschman
2023	Team K3	Herself	
2024	De Slimste Mens ter Wereld	Candidate	
2025	Hallo Kroket!	Herself	
2025	Musical Awards Gala	Herself	
2025	MakeUpDate	Herself	
2025	The Masked Singer	Guest panelist	Together with Marthe De Pillecyn and Julia Boschman
2026	James & co	Herself	
