= Clown (Emeli Sandé song) =

2013 single by Emeli Sandé

Single by Emeli Sandé

from the album Our Version of Events
- B-side: "Kill the Boy"
- Released: 3 February 2013
- Genre: R&B; soul
- Length: 3:41
- Label: Virgin
- Songwriters: Emeli Sandé; Shahid Khan; Grant Mitchell
- Producer: Naughty Boy

Emeli Sandé singles chronology
| "Beneath Your Beautiful" (2012) | "Clown" (2013) | "Bitch, Don't Kill My Vibe" (2013) |

"Clown" is a song by the Scottish recording artist Emeli Sandé. It was released on 3 February 2013 as the fifth single from her first studio album, Our Version of Events (2012). "Clown" was written by Sandé, Shahid Khan and Grant Mitchell, and produced by Khan under his production name of Naughty Boy.

== Background ==
The song is about Sandé's first experiences in the music industry, mainly reflecting her search to be signed by a music company and the encounters with several music business people. Commenting on the song, Sandé said:

It's about how I felt when I was trying to get signed, I was going for all these meetings and people were looking at me like 'What do we do with you'? It's about not allowing yourself to be judged by others or to be taken for an idiot. I feel the video reflects that.

== Music video ==
A music video to accompany the release of "Clown" was first released onto YouTube on 6 December 2012 with a total length of three minutes and forty-seven seconds. It was directed by WIZ. The video was made in the style of a silent film and shows Sandé being urged by a group of men, in military uniform, to sign a document to receive something in return. The music video takes inspiration from the 1928 silent film "Joan of Arc" as a woman is put on trial and urged by a group of men to recant her beliefs.

== Promotion ==
Sandé performed "Clown" during the final of the ninth series of The X Factor on 9 December 2012, as well as appearing on The Voice of Holland in November 2012. Sandé also performed the song on The Graham Norton Show on 11 January 2013.

"Clown" debuted in Australia at No. 34 in the week commencing 2 June 2014 on the back of The Voice contestants Candice Skjonnemand and Thando Sikwila performing the song on the show on 26 May 2014.

== Track listing ==
Digital EP

1. "Clown" – 3:41
2. "Clown" (Live at the Royal Albert Hall) – 4:06
3. "Kill the Boy" – 3:43
4. "Clown" (Instrumental) – 3:41
5. "Clown" (Music video) – 3:46

2013 Brit Awards

1. "Clown" / "Next to Me" (Live from the BRITs) – 4:53

== Credits and personnel ==
- Lead vocals – Emeli Sandé
- Lyrics – Emeli Sandé, Shahid Khan, Grant Mitchell
- Producers – Naughty Boy
- Piano – Grant Mitchell
- Label – Virgin Records

== Charts and certifications ==
=== Weekly charts ===
| Chart (2013–14) | Peak position |
|---|---|
| Australia (ARIA) | 34 |
| Austria (Ö3 Austria Top 40) | 30 |
| Belgium (Ultratop 50 Flanders) | 32 |
| Belgium Urban (Ultratop Flanders) | 6 |
| Germany (GfK) | 36 |
| Ireland (IRMA) | 6 |
| Netherlands (Single Top 100) | 25 |
| Scotland Singles (OCC) | 3 |
| Slovakia Airplay (ČNS IFPI) | 29 |
| Switzerland (Schweizer Hitparade) | 42 |
| UK Singles (OCC) | 4 |

=== Year-end charts ===
| Chart (2013) | Position |
|---|---|
| UK Singles (Official Charts Company) | 45 |

=== Certifications ===
| Region | Certification | Certified units/sales |
|---|---|---|
| United Kingdom (BPI) | Platinum | 600,000^{^} |
^{^} Shipments figures based on certification alone.

== Release history ==
| Country | Release date | Format(s) | Label |
|---|---|---|---|
| United Kingdom | 3 February 2013 | Digital EP | Virgin Records |

== O'G3NE version ==
"Clown"

Single by O'G3NE

from the album We Got This (Special Edition)
- Released: 23 May 2016
- Recorded: 2015
- Genre: Pop
- Length: 3:47
- Label: Cornelis Music
- Songwriters: Emeli Sandé; Shahid Khan; Grant Mitchell

O'G3NE singles chronology
| "Take the Money and Run" (2016) | "Clown" (2016) | "Loved You First" (2016) |

The Dutch three-piece girl group O'G3NE, released a cover version of the song in the Netherlands as a digital download on 23 May 2016 by Cornelis Music. The song peaked at number 64 on the Dutch Singles Chart. The song is included on the Special Edition of their third studio album, We Got This.

=== Track listing ===
Digital download
| No. | Title | Length |
|---|---|---|
| 1. | "Clown" | 3:47 |

=== Charts ===
| Chart (2016) | Peak position |
|---|---|
| Netherlands (Single Top 100) | 64 |

=== Release history ===
| Region | Date | Format | Label |
|---|---|---|---|
| Netherlands | 23 May 2016 | Digital download; CD | Cornelis Music |
