= Julia Boschman =

Dutch singer, actress and television presenter

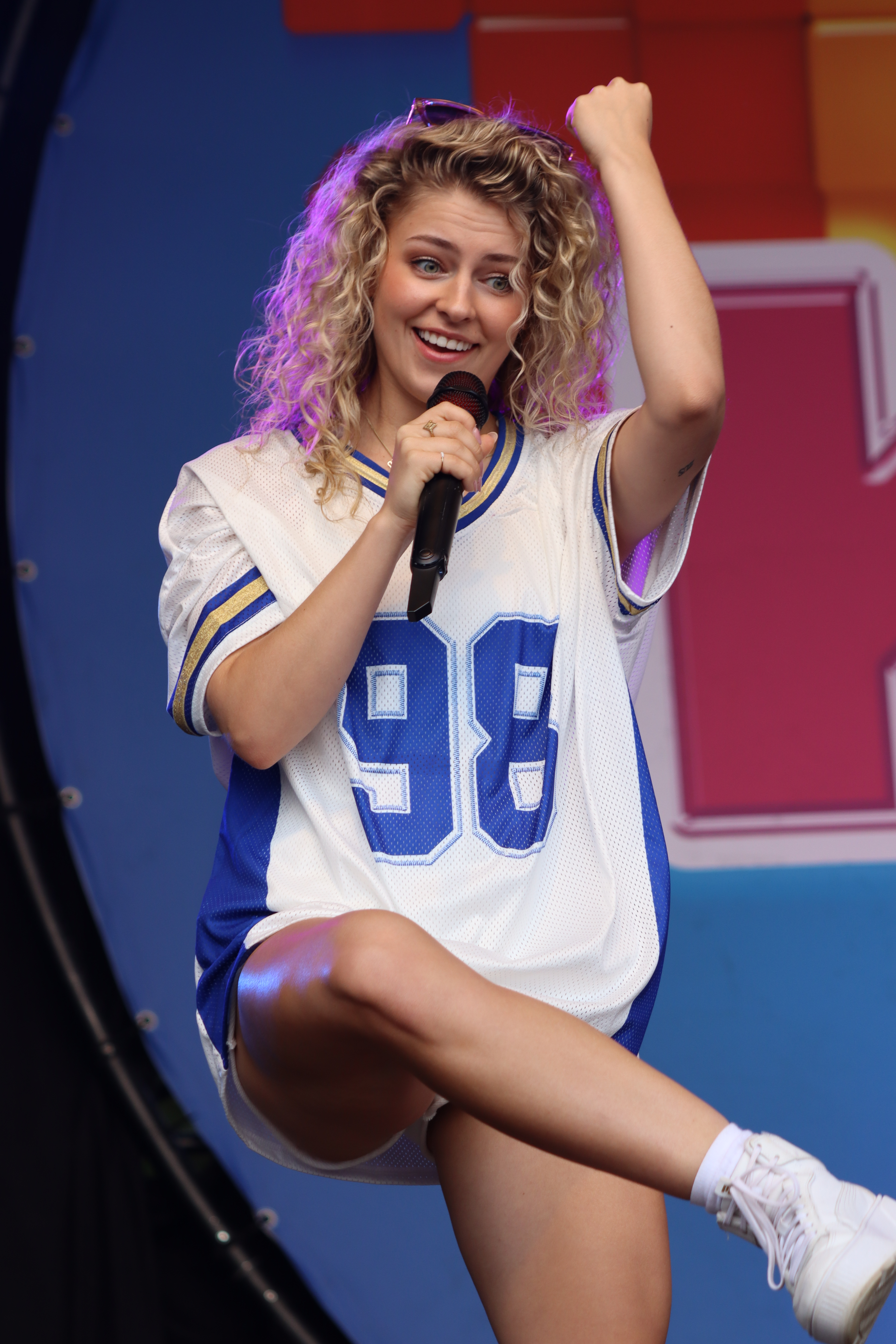
- Born: Julia Boschman; 8 June 2002 (age 24); Bergen op Zoom, Netherlands
- Other name: The blonde of K3
- Education: Roncalli JMC
- Occupations: Singer; actor; television personality
- Years active: 2015–present
- Notable work: K3 discography
- Partner: Louis Thyssen (2024–present)
- Musical career
- Genres: Pop
- Instruments: Vocals
- Label: Studio 100
- Member of: K3
- Website: www.k3.be

Signature
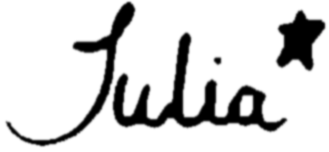

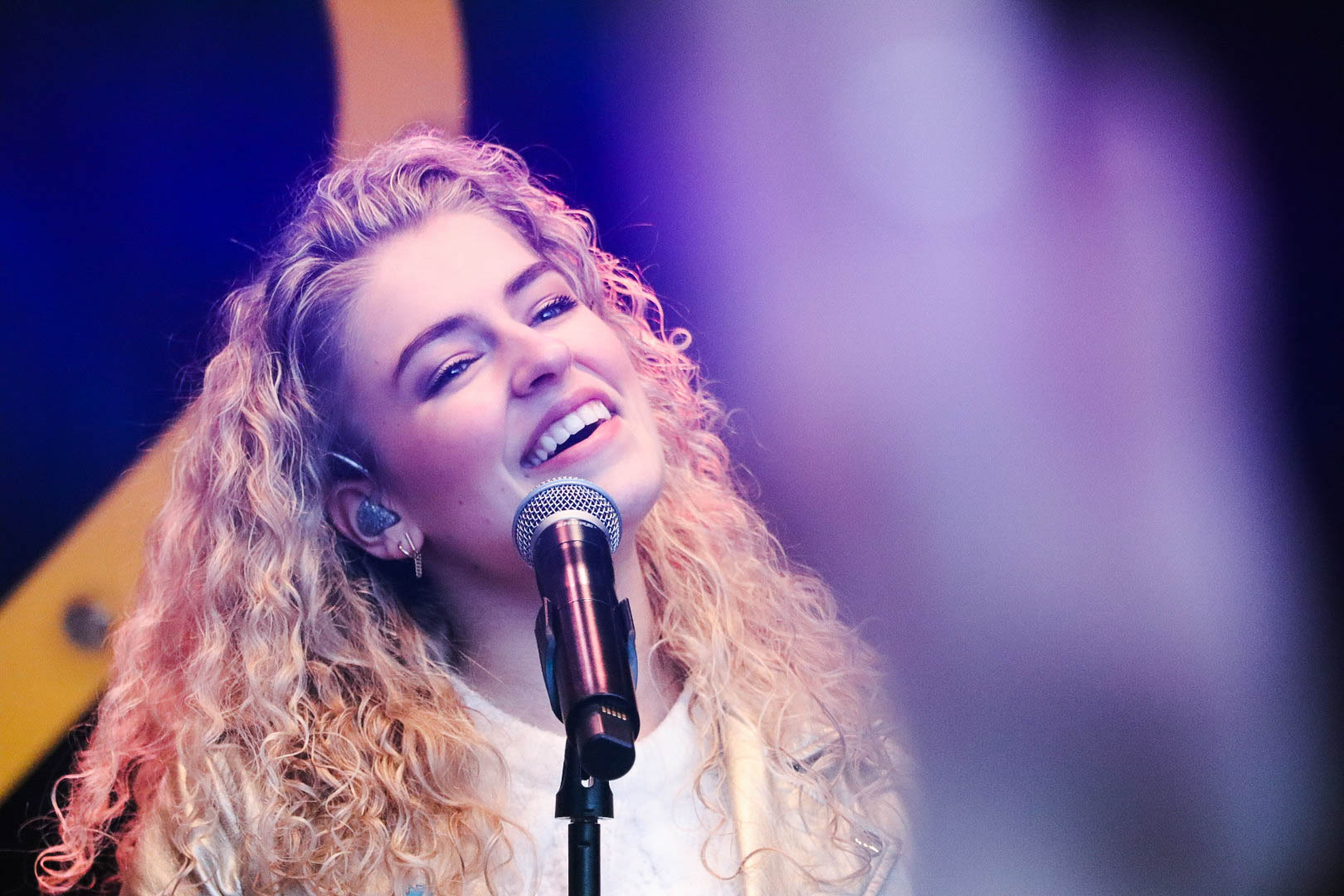
Boschman in 2021

Julia Boschman (born 8 June 2002) is a Dutch singer, (musical)actress, and television presenter. Since 2021, she has been a member of the Belgian–Dutch girl group K3.

== Early life ==
Boschman studied interior design consulting and worked at Intratuin garden center. She has been singing and performing in amateur productions since young age. For example, she played the role of Annie as a student of the Junior Musical Class and was part of the children's cast of Ciske De Rat at the BOV. She was also a member of The MusiCompany and CKB Musical Kids for a while. As of 2017, Boschman has performed in the ensemble of the Stichting JONG! Theater in Peter Pan and played the role of Jasmine in Aladdin. In 2019 she played the lead role in the Bergen open-air war show 'Supersum'.

== Career ==
On November 27, 2021, Julia Boschman became the winner of the TV talent show K2 zoekt K3 (K2 seeks K3) where she was chosen from 22,690 applicants as the new member of K3 and successor to Klaasje Meijer. Together with the remaining members Hanne Verbruggen and Marthe De Pillecyn, she has since formed the girl group.

== Personal life ==
Since July 2024 Julia Boschman has been in a relationship with Studio 100 Nachtwacht-actor Louis Thyssen.

== Discography ==
Studio albums
- 2021: Waterval
- 2022: Vleugels
- 2024: Het lied van de zeemeermin

== Filmography ==
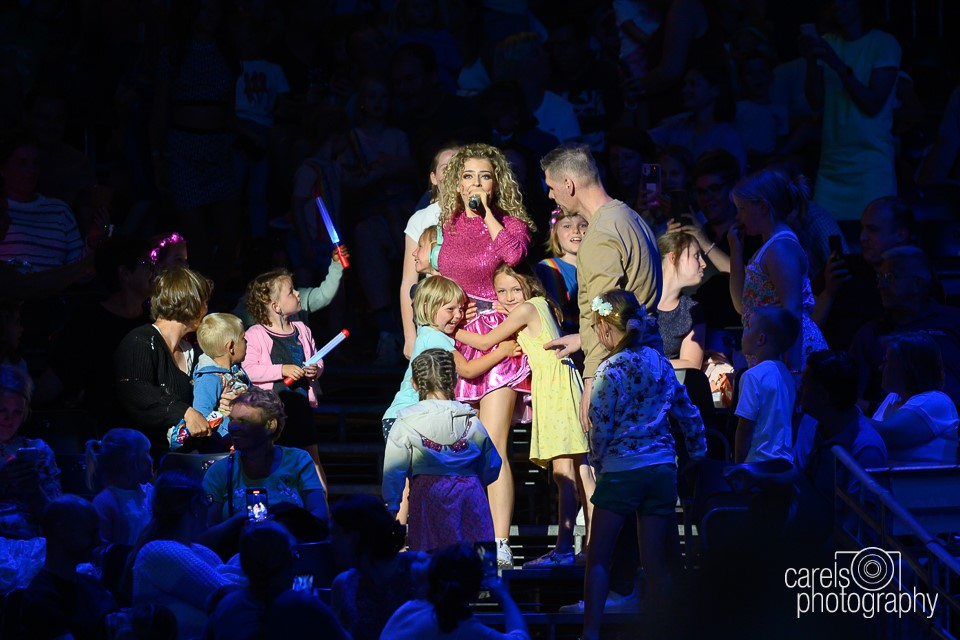
Boschman during a K3 Live Concert in 2023

Film
| Year | Title | Role | Notes |
|---|---|---|---|
| 2024 | K3 en Het Lied van de Zeemeermin | Julia | K3 theater movie, main role |
Television
| Year | Title | Role | Notes |
| 2015 | Ciske in beeld | Herself | |
| 2020 | Studio Pepernoot | Luisterpiet | Bergen Sinterklaasjournaal |
| 2021 | K2 zoekt K3 | Candidate | Winner |
| 2021 | K2 zoekt mee | Herself | |
| 2021– | K3 - Muziekclips | Herself | |
| 2021– | K3 Vlogt | Herself | |
| 2021 | K3, een nieuw begin | Herself | |
| 2022 | Marble Mania | Candidate | Together with Hanne Verbruggen and Marthe De Pillecyn |
| 2022 | The Voice Kids | Judge/coach | Together with Hanne Verbruggen and Marthe De Pillecyn |
| 2022 | K3, een nieuwe start | Herself | |
| 2022, 2024 | Zin in Zappelin | Herself | |
| 2022 | K3 Vriendenboek | Herself | |
| 2022 | K3, één jaar later | Herself | |
| 2022 | The Big Show | Herself | |
| 2023–2024 | Liefde voor muziek | Candidate | Together with Hanne Verbruggen and Marthe De Pillecyn |
| 2023 | Team K3 | Herself | |
| 2023 | Een terugblik op 25 jaar K3 | Herself | |
| 2024 | De Verhulstjes | Herself | |
| 2025 | Hallo Kroket! | Herself | |
| 2025 | Musical Awards Gala | Herself | |
| 2025 | MakeUpDate | Herself | |
| 2025 | Sing Again | Herself | |
| 2025 | The Masked Singer | Guest panelist | Together with Hanne Verbruggen and Marthe De Pillecyn |
| 2026 | James & co | Herself | |
