= Love Cruise (album) =

Studio album by K3
- Released: 17 November 2017
- Recorded: 2017
- Genre: Pop
- Length: 40:00
- Label: Studio 100
- Producer: Studio 100

K3 chronology
Ushuaia (2016)	Love Cruise (2017)	Roller Disco (2018)

Singles from Love Cruise
- 1. "Pina Colada" Released: 9 June 2017; 2. "Liefde Is Overal(Love Is Everywhere)" Released: 6 October 2017; 3. "Disco Oma(Disco Grandma)" Released: 3 January 2018

Love Cruise is the sixteenth studio album by the Belgian-Dutch girl group K3 and the third of Hanne Verbruggen, Klaasje Meijer and Marthe De Pillecyn. The album is the soundtrack to the K3 movie K3 Love Cruise, it was released on 17 November 2017 by Studio 100.

The first single was Pina Colada, released on 9 June 2017, before the album was released. A second single, Liefde Is Overal, followed on 6 October 2017. The third single, Disco Oma, was released on 3 January 2018, but the clip was released on 9 January 2018.

== Track listing ==
All tracks are written by Miguel Wiels, Peter Gilles, Alain Vande Putte.

Love Cruise – Standard edition disc 1
No.	Title	Length
1.	"Pina Colada"	3:23
2.	"Liefde Is Overal" (Love Is Everywhere)	4:01
3.	"1.000 Kleine Matroosjes" (1,000 Little Sailors)	2:21
4.	"Dieper Dan De Zee" (Deeper Than The Sea)	2:56
5.	"Verliefd Zijn" (Being in love)	3:25
6.	"Hippie Happy Holiday"	3:46
7.	"Ik Doe Wat Ik Wil" (I do what I want)	3:10
8.	"Disco Oma" (Disco Grandma)	3:19
9.	"Meisjes Doen De Wereld Draaien" (Girls Make The World Spin)	3:28
10.	"Baby Boe" (Baby Boo)	3:29
11.	"Pyjamaparty" (Pajama party)	3:22
12.	"Verlegen Vlindertje" (Shy Butterfly)	3:17
Total length:		40:00

== Charts ==
=== Weekly charts ===
Chart (2017)	Peak position
Belgian Albums (Ultratop Flanders)	1
Dutch Albums (Album Top 100)	4

=== Year-end charts ===
Chart (2017)	Position
Belgian Albums (Ultratop Flanders)	8
Chart (2018)	Position
Belgian Albums (Ultratop Flanders)	13

== Certifications ==
Region	Certification	Certified units/sales
Belgium (BRMA)	2× Platinum	40,000^{*}
^{*} Sales figures based on certification alone.
