= Magic (Ogene song) =

Single by O'G3NE

from the album We Got This (Special Edition)
- Released: 13 December 2014
- Recorded: 2014
- Genre: Pop
- Length: 2:54
- Label: 8ball TV
- Songwriter: Rick Vol

O'G3NE singles chronology
"Diep In De Nacht" (2013)	"Magic" (2014)	"Cold" (2015)

"Magic" is a single by Dutch three-piece girl group O'G3NE. The song was released in the Netherlands as a digital download on 13 December 2014 through 8ball TV. The song peaked at number 3 on the Dutch Singles Chart. The song is included on the Special Edition of their third studio album We Got This.

== Track listing ==
Digital download
No.	Title	Length
1.	"Magic"	2:54

== Charts ==
Chart (2014/15)	Peak position
Netherlands (Single Top 100)	3

== Release history ==
Region	Date	Format	Label
Netherlands	13 December 2014	Digital download; CD	8ball TV
