= Loved You First =

Loved You First may refer to:

- "Loved You First", a 2016 song by O'G3NE from We Got This
- "Loved You First", a 2012 song by One Direction from Take Me Home
