= Roller Disco (album) =

Studio album by K3
- Released: 16 November 2018
- Recorded: 2018
- Genre: Pop
- Length: 38:09
- Label: Studio 100
- Producer: Studio 100

K3 chronology
Love Cruise (2017)	Roller Disco (2018)	Dromen (2019)

Singles from Roller Disco
- 1. "Whoppa!" Released: 16 March 2018; 2. "Luka Luna" Released: 1 August 2018; 3. "Roller Disco" Released: 10 October 2018

Roller Disco is the seventeenth studio album by K3 and the fourth album by group members Hanne Verbruggen, Klaasje Meijer and Marthe De Pillecyn. It was released on 16 November 2018 and was sold with a bonus DVD of the "K3 Butterfly Show", the 2018 tour.

Three songs were previously released as singles in 2018: "Whoppa!" (16 March), "Luka Luna" (1 August) and the title track "Roller Disco" (10 October). Video clips of the three songs were also released. The songs on the album appear in episodes of K3 Roller Disco, a television series on VTM. In that fictional series, the singers of K3 are operators of a roller disco.

== Track listing ==
All tracks are written by Miguel Wiels, Peter Gilles, Alain Vande Putte.

Roller Disco – Standard edition
No.	Title	Length
1.	"Luka Luna"	3:23
2.	"Roller Disco"	3:16
3.	"Leve de cowboys" (Long live the cowboys)	3:12
4.	"Wie wordt straks m'n liefje" (Who will be soon my sweetheart)	3:13
5.	"Whoppa!"	3:19
6.	"Mooier dan je denkt" (More beautiful than you think)	3:39
7.	"La la later"	3:39
8.	"Hey Mister Deejay"	3:18
9.	"Muziek" (Music)	3:06
10.	"Bambolaya"	3:44
11.	"Liefde geeft je vleugels" (Love gives you wings)	3:30
12.	"De tafel van K3" (The table of K3)	2:50
Total length:		38:09

== Charts ==
=== Weekly charts ===
Chart (2018)	Peak position
Belgian Albums (Ultratop Flanders)	1
Dutch Albums (Album Top 100)	3

=== Year-end charts ===
Chart (2018)	Position
Belgian Albums (Ultratop Flanders)	14
Chart (2019)	Position
Belgian Albums (Ultratop Flanders)	32

== Certifications ==
Region	Certification	Certified units/sales
Belgium (BRMA)	2× Platinum	40,000^{*}
^{*} Sales figures based on certification alone.
