= Waterval (album) =

Studio album by K3
- Released: 17 December 2021
- Recorded: 2021
- Genre: Pop
- Length: 42:00
- Label: Studio 100
- Producer: Studio 100

K3 chronology
Dans van de farao (2020)	Waterval (2021)	Vleugels (2022)

Singles from Waterval
- 1. "Waterval(Waterfall)" Released: 27 November 2021; 2. "Tjikke boem" Released: 20 April 2022

Waterval is the twentieth studio album by the Belgian-Dutch group K3 and the first one with Hanne Verbruggen, Marthe De Pillecyn and Julia Boschman performing together. The album was released on 17 December 2021, produced by Studio 100. The first single from the album, called Waterval, was released on 27 November 2021, after Boschman joined the group having won the final of K2 zoekt K3 (K2 searches for K3). Tjikke boem was released as the second single on 20 April 2022.

In Belgium, the album immediately reached the first place in the Ultratop Albums Top 200 on 25 December 2021. This was the fifteenth time that a K3 album was in the first place. In the Netherlands, the album debuted at number two in the Album Top 100 at the same date. In February 2022, the album received a gold record.

The single Waterval became part of Just Dance 2022, a rhythm game developed and published by Ubisoft.

== Track listing ==
All tracks are written by Alain Vande Putte.

Waterval – Standard edition
No.	Title	Length
1.	"Waterval"	3:40
2.	"Tjikke boem"	3:36
3.	"Kruisje op een wereldkaart" (Cross on a world map)	4:02
4.	"Superster" (Superstar)	3:24
5.	"Giddy-up-a-gogo"	2:45
6.	"Onzichtbaar" (Invisible)	3:34
7.	"Straal!" (Shine!)	3:56
8.	"Liefde is je superkracht" (Love is your superpower)	3:47
9.	"Raket naar de maan" (Rocket to the moon)	3:33
10.	"Hart van peperkoek" (Heart of gingerbread)	3:06
11.	"Ik blijf bij jou" (I'll stay with you)	3:26
12.	"Er zal liefde zijn" (There will be love)	3:38
Total length:		42:00

== Charts ==
=== Weekly charts ===
Chart (2021)	Peak position
Belgian Albums (Ultratop Flanders)	1
Dutch Albums (Album Top 100)	2

=== Year-end charts ===
Chart (2022)	Position
Belgian Albums (Ultratop Flanders)	2
Dutch Albums (MegaCharts)	83
Chart (2023)	Position
Belgian Albums (Ultratop Flanders)	130
