= Dans van de farao =

Dans van de Farao

Studio album by K3
- Released: 13 November 2020
- Recorded: 2020
- Genre: Pop
- Length: 39:00
- Label: Studio 100
- Producer: Studio 100

K3 chronology
Dromen (2019)	Dans van de Farao (2020)	Waterval (2021)

Singles from Dans van de Farao
- 1. "Bubbel" Released: 11 April 2020; 2. "Bikini vol zand" Released: 12 June 2020; 3. "Dans van de Farao" Released: 14 October 2020; 4. "Piramide van liefde" Released: 2 December 2020

Dans van de Farao is the nineteenth studio album by the Belgian-Dutch girl group K3, released on 13 November 2020. The title is the same of their movie K3 Dans van de Farao and largely serves as the soundtrack for it. It is the last album with member Klaasje Meijer.

The album was sold with a bonus DVD of the "K3 Roller Disco Club", consisting of episodes of the spin-off of their fiction series K3 Roller Disco.

The single Dans van de Farao became part of Just Dance 2021, becoming their second song on the videogame.

== Track listing ==
All tracks are written by Miguel Wiels, Peter Gilles, Alain Vande Putte.

Dans van de Farao – Standard edition
No.	Title	Length
1.	"Dans van de Farao" (Dance of the Pharaoh)	3:24
2.	"Bikini vol zand" (Bikini full of sand)	3:20
3.	"Bubbel" (Bubble)	3:01
4.	"Vriend of vriendin (S.O.S.)" (Boyfriend or girlfriend (S.O.S.))	3:14
5.	"Jij en ik" (You and me)	3:19
6.	"Piramide van liefde" (Pyramid of love)	3:46
7.	"Een beetje liefde" (A little bit of love)	3:32
8.	"Voel je die zon" (Do you feel that sun)	3:05
9.	"Wat ik wensen zou" (What I would wish)	3:22
10.	"Hallelujah, het is zomer!" (Hallelujah, it's summer!)	2:56
11.	"Vogeltjes" (Birds)	3:25
12.	"Hallo!" (Hello!)	3:19
Total length:		39:00

== Charts ==
=== Weekly charts ===
Chart (2020)	Peak position
Belgian Albums (Ultratop Flanders)	1
Dutch Albums (Album Top 100)	4

=== Year-end charts ===
Chart (2021)	Position
Belgian Albums (Ultratop Flanders)	43

== Certifications ==
Region	Certification	Certified units/sales
Belgium (BRMA)	Gold	10,000^{‡}
^{‡} Sales+streaming figures based on certification alone.
