= The Power of Christmas =

Single by Lisa, Amy & Shelley
- Released: 5 December 2008
- Recorded: 2008
- Genre: Pop
- Length: 3:32
- Label: Dino Music; EMI

Lisa, Amy & Shelley singles chronology
"Strand" (2008)	"The Power of Christmas" (2008)	"Op De Radio" (2012)

"The Power of Christmas" is a single by Dutch three-piece girl group Lisa, Amy & Shelley. The song was released in the Netherlands as a digital download on 5 December 2008 through Dino Music and EMI. The song peaked to number 98 on the Dutch Singles Chart.

== Track listing ==
Digital download
No.	Title	Length
1.	"The Power of Christmas"	3:32
2.	"Marshmallow World"	2:26
3.	"Twinkle Twinkle Little Me"	3:08
4.	"Sleigh Ride"	3:12

== Chart performance ==
=== Weekly charts ===
Chart (2009)	Peak position
Netherlands (Single Top 100)	98

== Release history ==
Region	Date	Format	Label
Netherlands	5 December 2008	Digital download; CD	Dino Music; EMI
