= Cold (Ogene song) =

Single by O'G3NE
- Released: 13 March 2015
- Recorded: 2014
- Genre: Pop
- Length: 2:40
- Label: 8ball TV

O'G3NE singles chronology
"Magic" (2014)	"Cold" (2015)	"Wings to Fly" (2015)

"Cold" is a single by Dutch three-piece girl group O'G3NE. The song was released in the Netherlands as a digital download on 13 March 2015 by 8ball TV. The song peaked at number 70 on the Dutch Singles Chart.

== Track listing ==
Digital download
No.	Title	Length
1.	"Cold"	2:40

== Charts ==
Chart (2015)	Peak position
Netherlands (Single Top 100)	70

== Release history ==
Region	Date	Format	Label
Netherlands	13 March 2015	Digital download; CD	8ball TV
