= Vleugels =

Studio album by K3
- Released: 18 November 2022
- Recorded: 2022
- Genre: Pop
- Length: 41:00
- Label: Studio 100
- Producer: Studio 100

K3 chronology
Waterval (2021)	Vleugels (2022)	Het lied van de zeemeermin (2024)

Singles from Vleugels
- 1. "Nooit meer oorlog(Never again war)" Released: 21 March 2022; 2. "Mango Mango" Released: 18 May 2022; 3. "Vleugels(Wings)" Released: 21 September 2022; 4. "Visje in het water(Fish in the water)" Released: 12 October 2022

Vleugels is the twenty-first studio album by the Belgian-Dutch girl group K3, released on 18 November 2022. It's the second album by group members Hanne Verbruggen, Marthe De Pillecyn and Julia Boschman.

The title track "Vleugels" became part of Just Dance 2023 Edition, in which the members themselves appear as the dancers in a ‘VIP Version’. Because Verbruggen was pregnant at that time, it became the first Just Dance map to feature a visibly pregnant coach.

== Track listing ==
All tracks are written by Alain Vande Putte.

Vleugels – Standard edition
No.	Title	Length
1.	"Vleugels" (Wings)	3:47
2.	"Visje in het water" (Fish in the water)	3:31
3.	"Sprookjesboek" (Fairytale book)	3:19
4.	"Nooit meer oorlog" (Never again war)	3:11
5.	"Mango Mango"	3:36
6.	"Het mooiste liedje ooit" (The most beautiful song ever)	3:32
7.	"Parapluutjes" (Umbrellas)	3:27
8.	"Wat doe ik met mijn haar" (What do I do with my hair)	3:02
9.	"Kampioen" (Champion)	3:30
10.	"Hier komt de zon" (Here comes the sun)	3:05
11.	"Toetje" (Dessert)	3:26
12.	"Ik geloof in jou" (I believe in you)	3:49
Total length:		41:00

== Charts ==
=== Weekly charts ===
Chart (2022)	Peak position
Belgian Albums (Ultratop Flanders)	1
Dutch Albums (Album Top 100)	2

=== Year-end charts ===
Chart (2023)	Position
Belgian Albums (Ultratop Flanders)	43
