= Wings to Fly =

Single by O'G3NE
- Released: 10 July 2015
- Recorded: 2015
- Genre: Pop
- Length: 3:25
- Label: 8ball Music

O'G3NE singles chronology
"Cold" (2015)	"Wings to Fly" (2015)	"Take the Money and Run" (2016)

"Wings to Fly" is a single by Dutch three-piece girl group O'G3NE. The song was released in the Netherlands as a digital download on 10 July 2015 through 8ball Music. The song peaked at number 100 on the Dutch Singles Chart.

== Track listing ==
Digital download
No.	Title	Length
1.	"Wings To Fly"	3:25

== Chart performance ==
=== Weekly charts ===
Chart (2015)	Peak position
Netherlands (Single Top 100)	100

== Release history ==
Region	Date	Format	Label
Netherlands	10 July 2015	Digital download; CD	8ball Music
