= Take the Money and Run (Ogene song) =

Single by O'G3NE

from the album We Got This
- Released: 29 April 2016
- Recorded: 2015
- Genre: Pop
- Length: 2:44
- Label: BMG

O'G3NE singles chronology
"Wings to Fly" (2015)	"Take the Money and Run" (2016)	"Clown" (2016)

"Take the Money and Run" is a single by Dutch three-piece girl group O'G3NE. The song was released in the Netherlands as a digital download on 29 April 2016 through BMG as the lead single from their third studio album We Got This (2016). The song peaked at number 130 on the Dutch Singles Chart.

== Track listing ==
Digital download
No.	Title	Length
1.	"Take the Money and Run"	2:44

== Chart performance ==
Chart (2016)	Peak position
Netherlands (Single Top 100)	130

== Release history ==
Region	Date	Format	Label
Netherlands	29 April 2016	Digital download; CD	BMG
