= K3 Dans van de Farao =

2020 film

K3: Dans van de Farao
- Theatrical release poster
- Directed by: Bart Van Leemputten
- Written by: Gert Verhulst; Hans Bourlon; Nico De Braeckeleer; Sven Duym; Bart Van Leemputten
- Produced by: Anja Van Mensel
- Starring: Hanne Verbruggen; Klaasje Meijer; Marthe De Pillecyn
- Music by: K3
- Production company: Studio 100
- Distributed by: Splendid Film
- Release date: 5 June 2021
- Running time: 90 minutes
- Countries: Belgium; Netherlands
- Language: Dutch

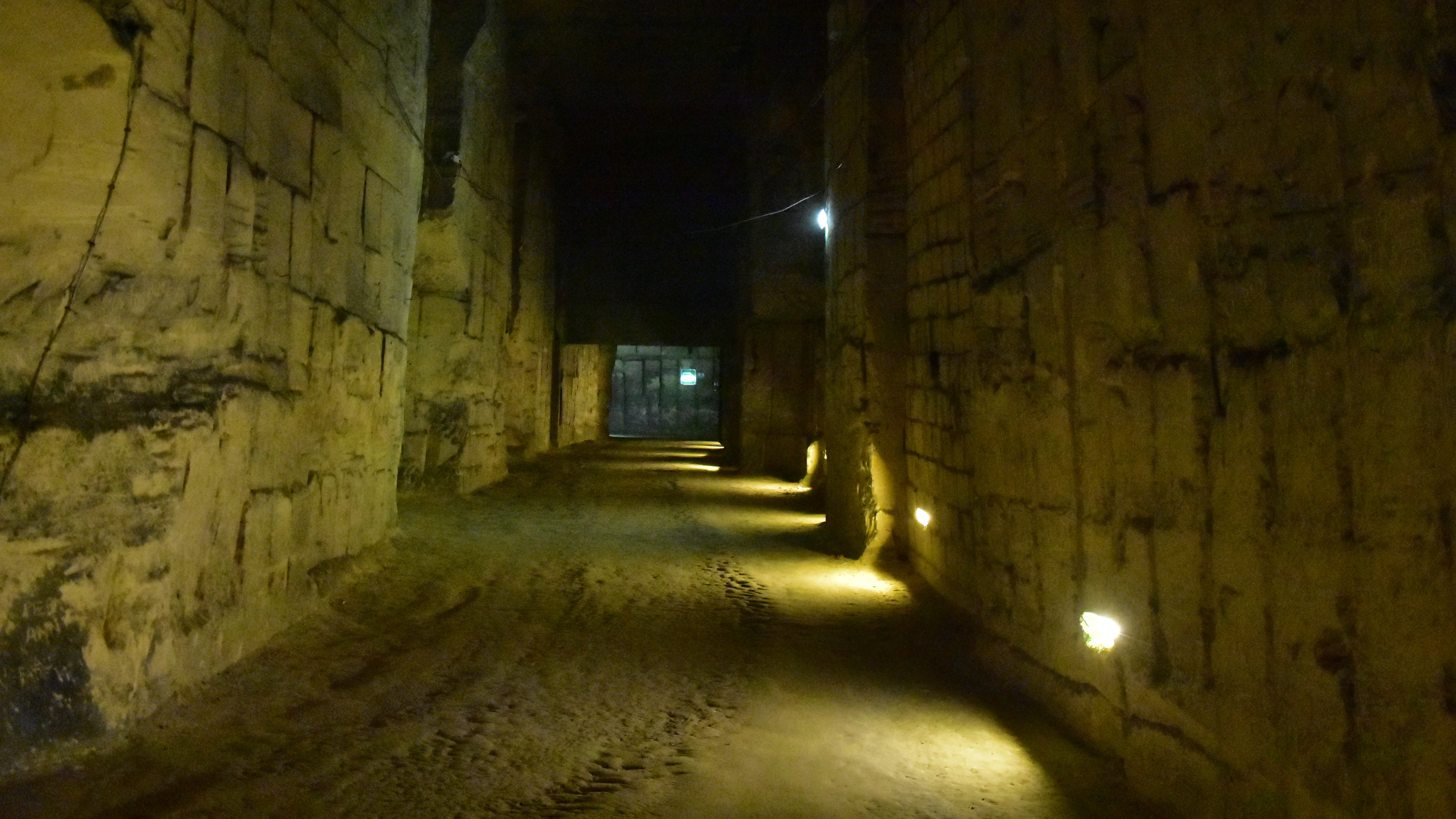
The set of 'Dans van de Farao' in the Caves of Kanne

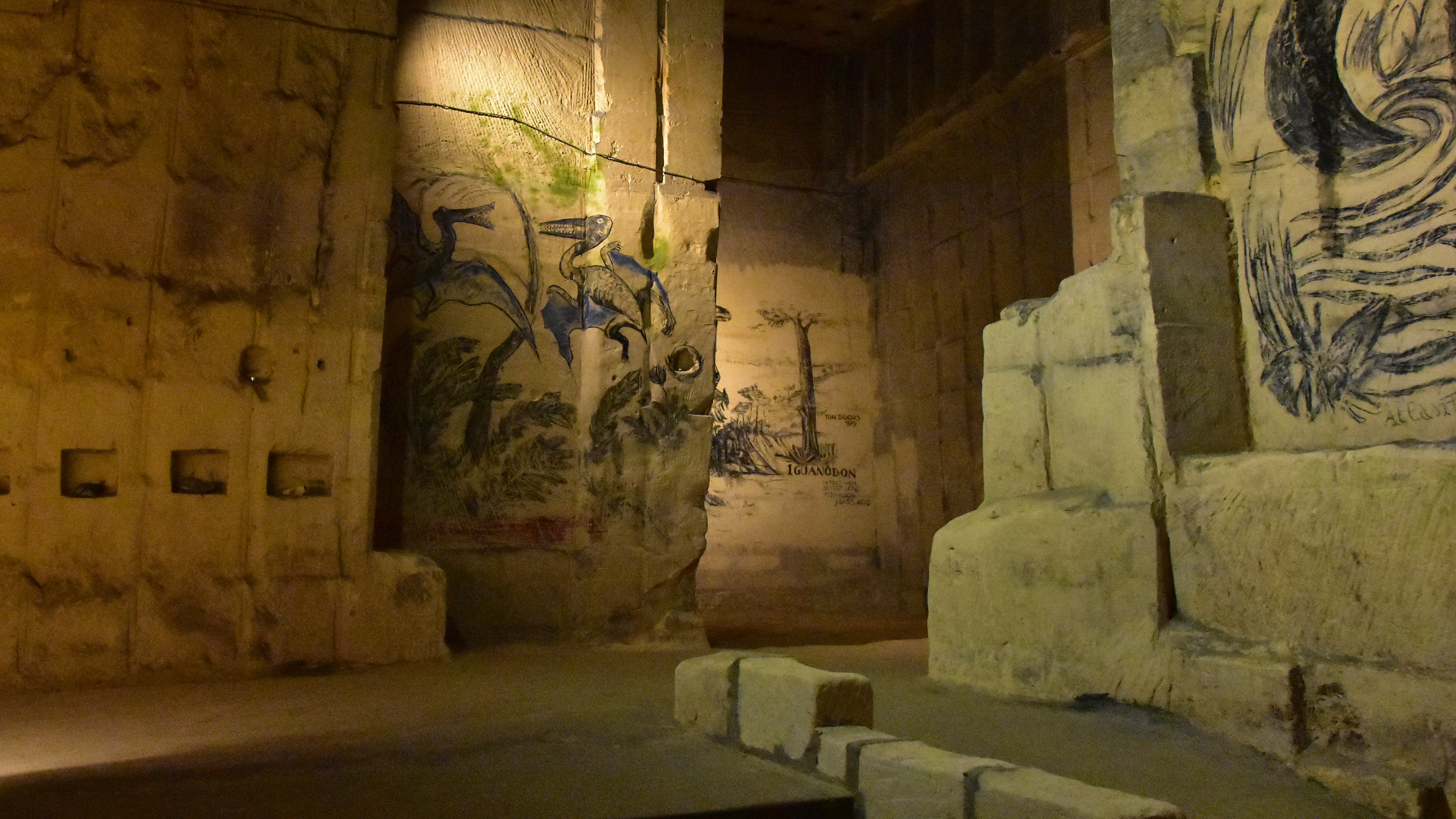

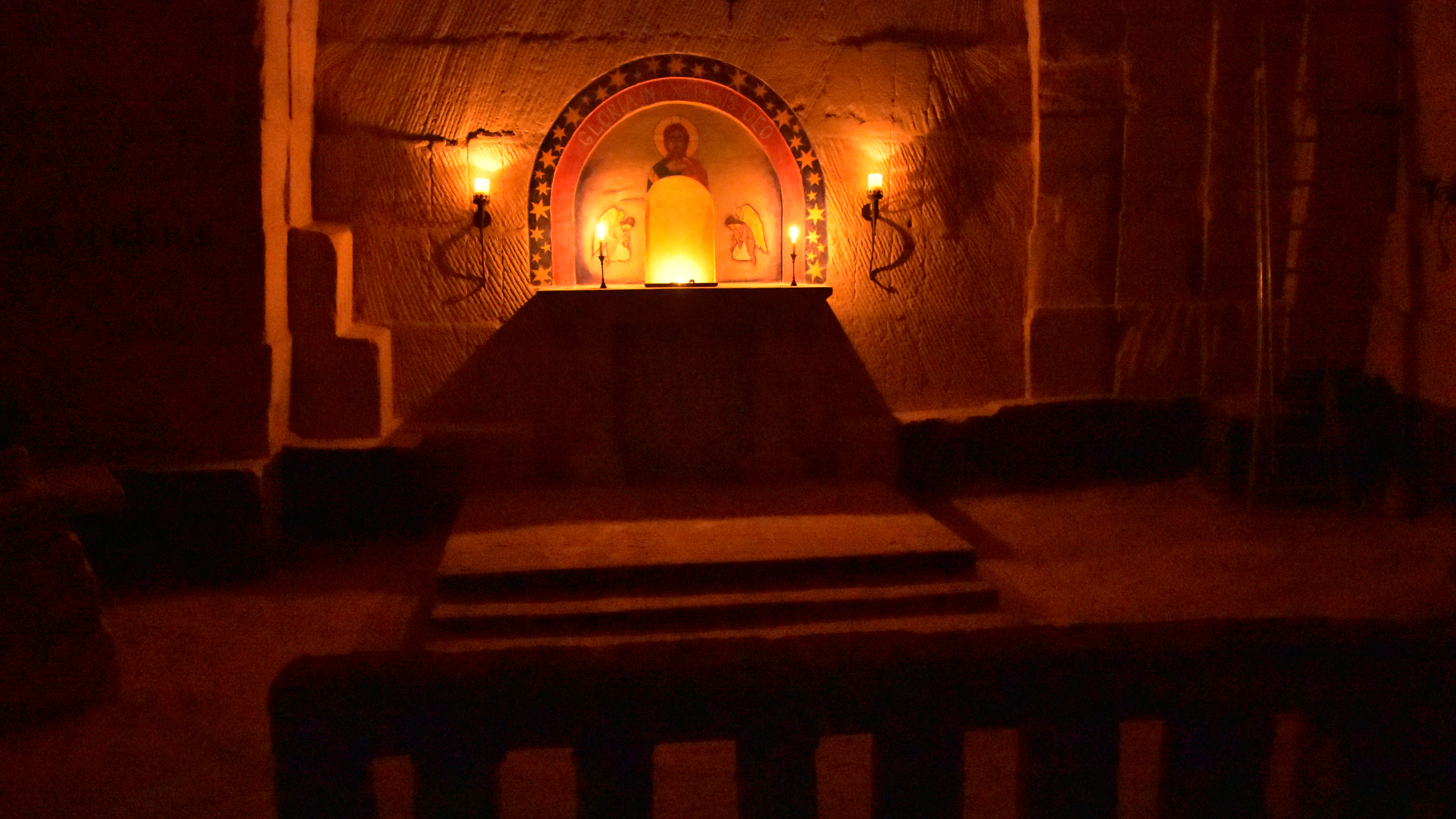

K3: Dans van de Farao (English: K3 Dance of the Pharaoh) is the seventh film by the girl group K3, based on a screenplay by Hans Bourlon and Gert Verhulst, directed by Bart Van Leemputten. The film was released in 2021 and the music album of the same name was released in November 2020. It is the last K3-film with Klaasje Meijer. The original premiere was to take place in December 2020, but was postponed due to the corona measures. The film eventually premiered in the Netherlands on 5 June 2021 and in Belgium on 9 June 2021.

Their title song 'Dans van de Farao' became part of Just Dance 2021.

== Plot ==
K3 will present their brand new CD in the Egyptian museum. When they bump into a wishing cat during the preparations, all three are allowed to make a wish. Hanne wishes she could read the minds of animals and people. Marthe wishes she could buy everything she wants for herself and Klaasje wants her to keep wishing for as long as she wants. What they don't know is that the wishes of the wishing cat have been cursed by Pharaoh Tritanchamon. The cursed wishes turn against K3 and cause arguments between the three. Just before their performance they have to decide whether or not to stop with K3.

== Cast ==
Character	Actor
Hanne	Hanne Verbruggen
Klaasje	Klaasje Meijer
Marthe	Marthe De Pillecyn
Marcel	Jacques Vermeire
Guus	Samir Hassan
Lucas	Soy Kroon
Archibald	Carry Goossens
Mirthe	Britt Scholte
Journalist	Fenna Ramos

== Voices ==
Character	Actor
Egyptian pharaoh Tritanchamon	Peter Van De Velde
Wish cat Cleo	Goele De Raedt
Dromedary Freddy	Bart Van Leemputten

== DVD ==
The Video DVD was released on 1 October 2021.
