= Adem in, adem uit =

Single by Lisa, Amy and Shelley

from the album 300%
- Released: October 2007
- Recorded: 2007
- Genre: Pop
- Length: 2:51
- Label: Dino Music; EMI
- Songwriters: Amy Vol, Lisa Vol, Shelley Vol

Lisa, Amy and Shelley singles chronology
"Adem in, adem uit" (2007)	"Zet 'm op!" (2008)

Music video
- 'Adem in, adem uit" (live at the 2007 Junior Eurovision Song Contest) on YouTube

"Adem in, adem uit" (transl. "Breathe in, breathe out") is a single by Dutch three-piece girl group Lisa, Amy & Shelley. The song was released in the Netherlands as a digital download in October 2007. It was released as the lead single from their debut studio album 300% (2008). The song peaked at number 55 on the Dutch Singles Chart. The song was chosen to represent the Netherlands at the 2007 Junior Eurovision Song Contest. The song received 39 points, placing 11th of the 17 competing countries.

== Track listing ==
Digital download
No.	Title	Length
1.	"Adem in, adem uit"	2:51

== Chart performance ==
=== Weekly charts ===
Chart (2007)	Peak position
Netherlands (Single Top 100)	55

== Release history ==
Region	Date	Format	Label
Netherlands	October 2007	Digital download; CD	Dino Music; EMI
