= Dromen =

Studio album by K3
- Released: 15 November 2019
- Recorded: 2019
- Genre: Pop
- Length: 38:09
- Label: Studio 100
- Producer: Studio 100

K3 chronology
Roller Disco (2018)	Dromen (2019)	Dans van de farao (2020)

Singles from Dromen
- 1. "Land van de Regenboog" Released: 16 March 2019; 2. "Heyah Mama 2.0" Released: 21 March 2019; 3. "Jij bent mijn Gigi" Released: 5 June 2019; 4. "Altijd blijven dromen" Released: 25 September 2019

Dromen is the eighteenth studio album by the Belgian-Dutch music trio K3. The album was released on 15 November 2019 and was sold with a bonus DVD of the "20 year K3 Show", the 2019 spectacle show tour of celebration the 20 year anniversary of the pop group.

Four songs were previously released as a single in 2019: Land van de Regenboog (16 March), Heyah Mama 2.0 (21 March), Jij bent mijn Gigi (5 June) and the title track Altijd blijven dromen (25 September). Video clips have also been released for three of these four songs, but not for "Heyah Mama 2.0".

To promote the album, the members Hanne Verbruggen, Klaasje Meijer and Marthe De Pillecyn drove a double-decker bus to visit and perform at three Flemish schools on 14 November 2019.

== Track listing ==
All tracks are written by Miguel Wiels, Peter Gilles, Alain Vande Putte.

Dromen – Standard edition
No.	Title	Length
1.	"Altijd blijven dromen" (Always keep dreaming)	3:15
2.	"Jij bent mooi" (You are beautiful)	3:18
3.	"Jij bent mijn Gigi" (You are my Gigi)	3:38
4.	"Land van de Regenboog" (Land of the Rainbow)	3:48
5.	"Ra-ta-ta-ta"	3:23
6.	"Tika Tika"	3:06
7.	"Feestje in de keuken" (Party in the kitchen)	3:11
8.	"Ciao amore mio"	3:27
9.	"Mijn held" (My hero)	3:17
10.	"Dit is jouw verjaardag" (This is your birthday)	3:28
11.	"Zo een liedje" (Such a song)	4:33
12.	"Heyah Mama 2.0"	3:11
Total length:		41:00

== Charts ==
=== Weekly charts ===
Chart (2019)	Peak position
Belgian Albums (Ultratop Flanders)	1
Dutch Albums (Album Top 100)	3

=== Year-end charts ===
Chart (2020)	Position
Belgian Albums (Ultratop Flanders)	39

== Certifications ==
Region	Certification	Certified units/sales
Belgium (BRMA)	Platinum	20,000^{‡}
^{‡} Sales+streaming figures based on certification alone.
