= K3 Love Cruise =

2017 film

- Theatrical release poster
- Directed by: Frederick Sonck
- Written by: Gert Verhulst; Hans Bourlon; Nico De Braeckeleer
- Produced by: Anja Van Mensel
- Starring: Hanne Verbruggen; Klaasje Meijer; Marthe De Pillecyn
- Cinematography: Jan Mestdagh
- Music by: K3
- Production company: Studio 100
- Distributed by: Splendid Film
- Release date: 9 December 2017
- Running time: 90 minutes
- Countries: Belgium; Netherlands
- Language: Dutch

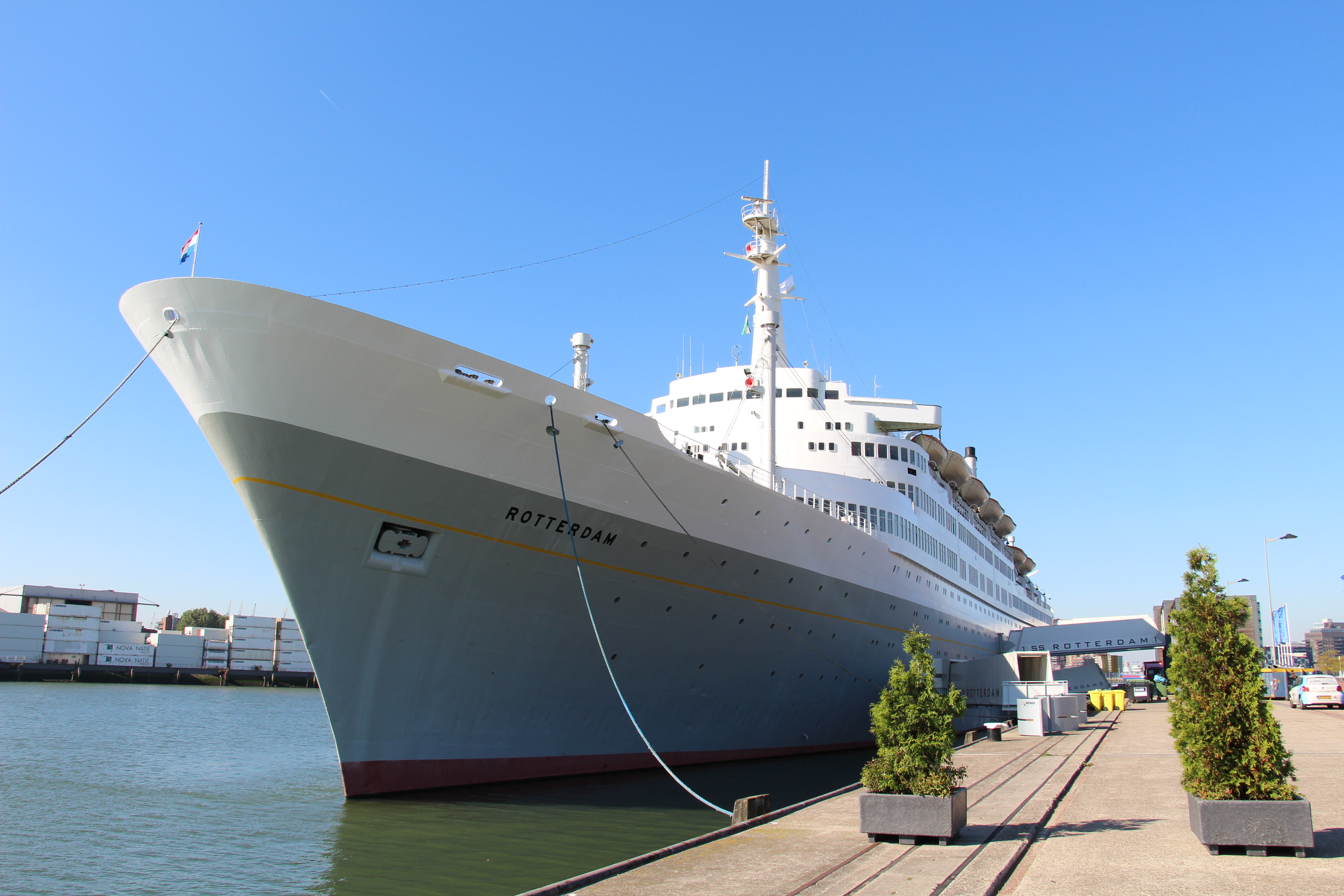
The ship in 'K3 Love Cruise' SS Rotterdam

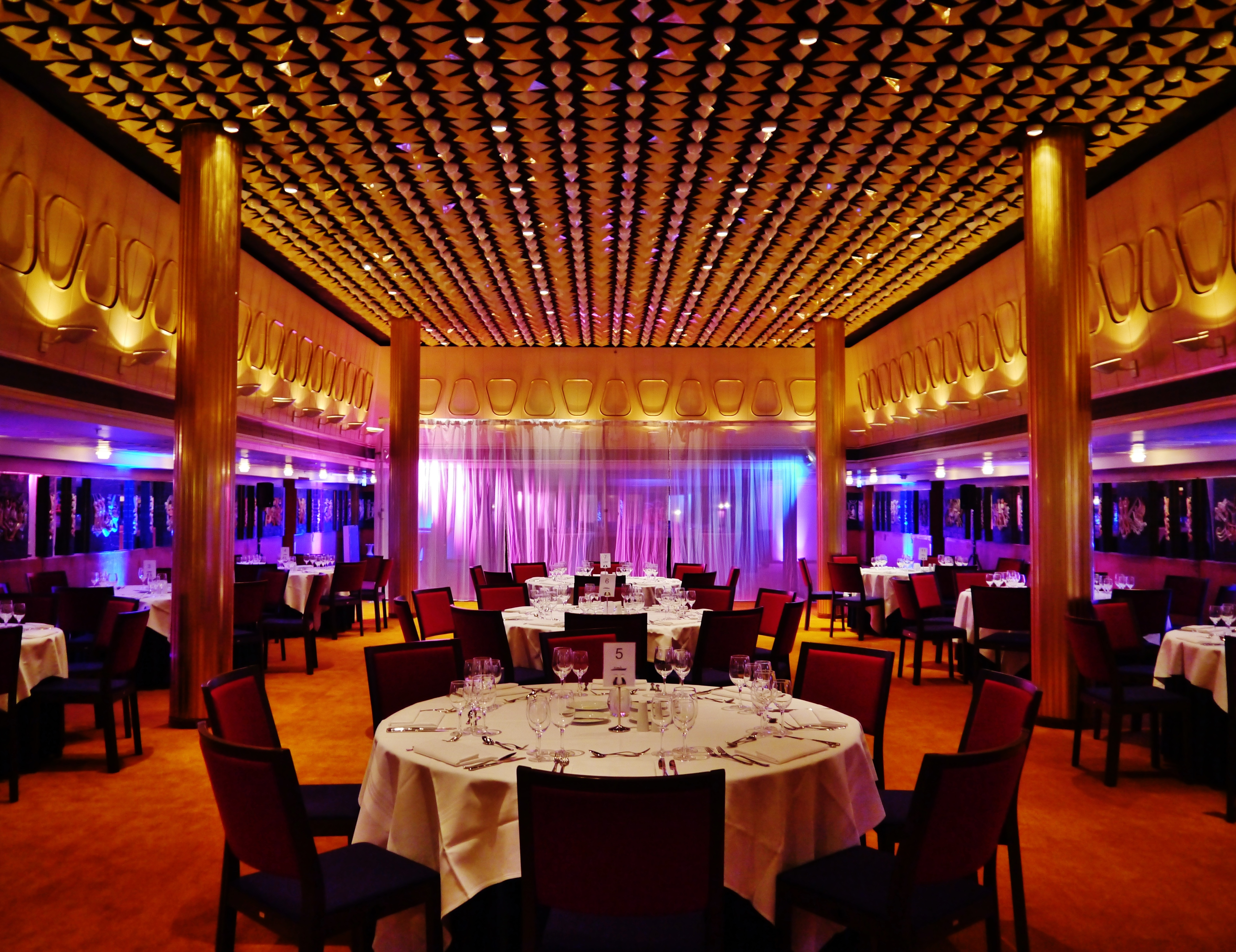

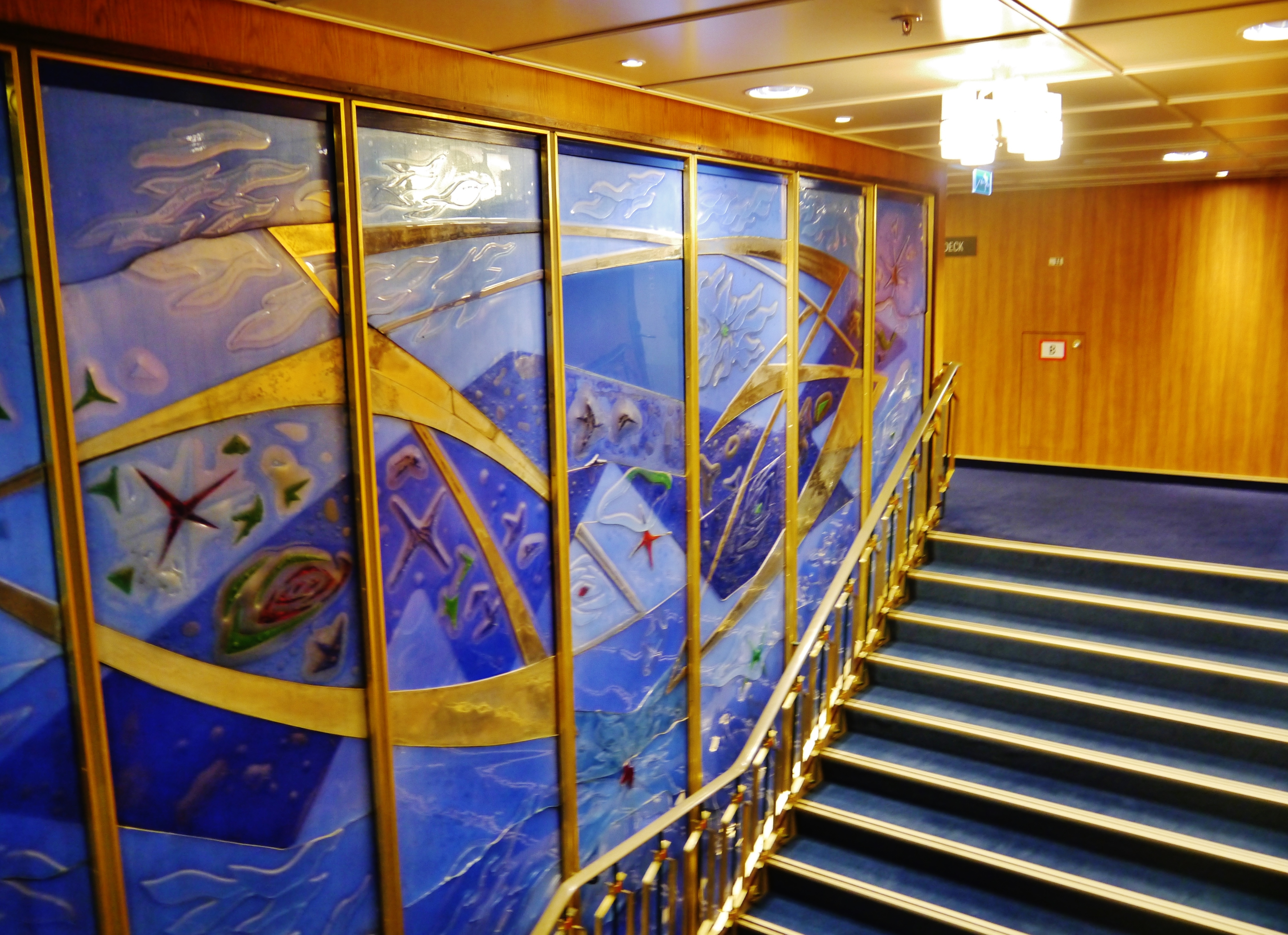

K3 Love Cruise is a 2017 comedy film starring the members of K3. It is the sixth K3-film and the first by Hanne Verbruggen, Klaasje Meijer and Marthe De Pillecyn. The film is directed by Frederick Sonck and written by Gert Verhulst, Hans Bourlon and Nico De Braeckeleer. The recordings largely took place on the ship SS Rotterdam.

== Plot ==
Hanne, Klaasje and Marthe have been invited to the Rotterdam by captain Bas to perform for the travelers present during the cruise. The journey goes smoothly, until the pearl that Klaasje received from her grandmother turns into a pearl elf, which is only visible to the girls of K3. Elvin sails with the cruise to the Bikini Circle, the place where he was kidnapped by Klaasje's great-great-grandfather, to see his daughter again. During the journey he also sees the opportunity to take revenge on the girls of K3 by bullying them and making things fail.

== Cast ==
=== Main ===
- Hanne Verbruggen - Hanne
- Klaasje Meijer - Klaasje
- Marthe De Pillecyn - Marthe

=== Supporting ===
- Jacques Vermeire - Marcel (Neighbour)
- Winston Post - Bas (Captain of the SS Rotterdam)
- Nicolette van Dam - Mrs Visschers (Cruise director)
- Sven De Ridder - Elvin (Pearl Elf)
- Maartje Van Neygen - Ayla (Elf, daughter of Elvin)
- Ashley Ntangu - Jasmijn (Klaasje's old school friend)
- Tim Douwsma - Alex (Former neighbor of Hanne)
- Dorian Liveyns - Bellhop
- Harold Brusse - Sailor/guard
- Babs Boumans - Yoga teacher
- Diego González-Clark - Server
- Damian Ramrekha - Server
- Truus de Boer - Friend
- Bart de Graauw - Athlete

=== Minor ===
- Laetitia Milet

== DVD ==
The Video DVD was released on 20 April 2018.
