= Sweet 16 (album) =

Studio album by Lisa, Amy & Shelley
- Released: 14 October 2011
- Recorded: 2009/10
- Genre: Pop
- Label: Cloud 9 Music

Lisa, Amy & Shelley chronology
The Power of Christmas (2008)	Sweet 16 (2011)	We Got This (2016)

Singles from Sweet 16
- 1. "Fout ventje" Released: 2 September 2010; 2. "Niemand" Released: 29 April 2011; 3. "Dicht bij jou" Released: 31 August 2011; 4. "Boemerdeboem" Released: 17 February 2012; 5. "Op de radio" Released: 14 September 2012

Sweet 16 is the second studio album by Dutch three-piece girl group Lisa, Amy & Shelley. It was released in the Netherlands on 14 October 2011 by Cloud 9 Music. The album peaked at number 45 on the Dutch Albums Chart.

== Singles ==
"Fout Ventje" was released as the lead single from the album on 2 September 2010. "Niemand" was released as the second single on 29 April 2011. "Dicht bij jou" was released as the third single on 31 August 2011. "Boemerdeboem" was released as the fourth single on 17 February 2012. "Op de radio" was released as the fifth and final single on 14 September 2012.

== Track listing ==
No.	Title	Length
1.	"Dicht bij jou"	3:20
2.	"Boemerdeboem"	3:05
3.	"Op de Radio"	3:11
4.	"Niemand"	2:57
5.	"Een vriend"	3:46
6.	"Het is feest"	2:54
7.	"Fout ventje"	2:38
8.	"Mee naar boven"	3:11
9.	"Nee"	3:26
10.	"Te quiero"	3:24
11.	"Bedankt"	3:30
12.	"Boemerdeboem" (*)	3:05
13.	"Het is feest" (*)	2:54
14.	"Fout ventje" (*)	2:37
15.	"Mee naar boven" (*)	3:11
16.	"Te quiero" (*)	3:24

* Karaoke bonus tracks

== Charts ==
=== Weekly charts ===
Chart (2011)	Peak position
Dutch Albums (MegaCharts)	45

== Release history ==
Region	Date	Format	Label
Netherlands	14 October 2011	Digital download, CD	Cloud 9 Music
