= 300% (album) =

Studio album by Lisa, Amy & Shelley
- Released: 2 June 2008
- Recorded: 2007
- Genre: Pop
- Labels: Dino Music; EMI

Lisa, Amy & Shelley chronology
| 300% (2008) | The Power of Christmas (2008) |

Singles from 300%
- 1. "Adem in, adem uit" Released: October 2007; 2. "Zet 'm op!" Released: May 2008; 3. "Strand" Released: 2008

300% is the debut studio album by the Dutch three-piece girl group Lisa, Amy & Shelley. It was released in the Netherlands on the 2 June 2008 by Dino Music and EMI. The album peaked at number 26 on the Dutch Albums Chart. The album includes the singles "Adem in, adem uit", "Zet 'm op!" and "Strand".

== Singles ==
"Adem in, adem uit" was released as the lead single from the album in October 2007. The song peaked at number 55 on the Dutch Singles Chart. "Zet 'm op!" was released as the second single from the album in May 2008. The song peaked at number 60 on the Dutch Singles Chart. "Strand" was released as the third single from the album in 2008.

== Track listing ==
| No. | Title | Length |
|---|---|---|
| 1. | "Zet 'm op!" | 3:06 |
| 2. | "Adem in, adem uit" | 2:51 |
| 3. | "Strand" | 3:35 |
| 4. | "Samen is veel leuker" | 2:16 |
| 5. | "Pagina 10" | 3:07 |
| 6. | "Meid zonder tijd" | 3:09 |
| 7. | "Wat je maar wilt" | 2:55 |
| 8. | "Nooit alleen" | 3:41 |
| 9. | "100% verliefd" | 3:38 |
| 10. | "Mag het licht aan" | 3:25 |
| 11. | "1 jaar lang" | 3:40 |
| 12. | "De wereld dichterbij" | 3:16 |
| 13. | "Als de bel gaat" | 3:33 |

== Charts ==
=== Weekly charts ===
| Chart (2008) | Peak position |
|---|---|
| Dutch Albums (MegaCharts) | 26 |

== Release history ==
| Region | Date | Format | Label |
|---|---|---|---|
| Netherlands | 2 June 2008 | Digital download, CD | Dino Music; EMI |
