= K3 en Het Lied van de Zeemeermin =

2024 film

- Theatrical release poster
- Directed by: Bart Van Leemputten
- Written by: Annelies Van de Woestyne; Bjorn Van den Eynde
- Starring: Hanne Verbruggen; Marthe De Pillecyn; Julia Boschman
- Music by: K3
- Production company: Studio 100
- Distributed by: Kinepolis Film Distribution (Belgium); In The Air (Netherlands)
- Release dates: 15 December 2024 (Belgium); 29 January 2025 (Netherlands)
- Running time: 104 minutes
- Countries: Belgium; Netherlands
- Language: Dutch

K3 en Het Lied van de Zeemeermin (English: K3 and the Mermaid's song) is a 2024 comedy/adventure film with in de leading role the girls of the Flemish-Dutch pop group K3. It is the eighth K3-film and the first one with new member Julia Boschman. The film was shot on the island of Malta and directed by Bart Van Leemputten.

== Plot ==
Hanne, Marthe and Julia of K3 are going on holiday to Malta. They stay in the village of Porto Sirento located on the coast and it seems to be a musical holiday. Then they are suddenly struck by a spell that turns them into mermaids. Because they do not want to be noticed, they avoid visiting the beach, where their fish tail would be clearly visible. In the village itself, they also have to make an effort not to be exposed as mermaids, as the residents regard these fictional creatures as monsters. It turns out they only have three days to break the spell. If this doesn't work, they will remain mermaids forever and they lose their future as K3.

== Cast ==
=== Main ===
- Hanne Verbruggen as Hanne
- Marthe De Pillecyn as Marthe
- Julia Boschman as Julia

=== Supporting ===
- Eva Kamanda as Ella
- Bert De Kock as Diego
- Diego González-Clark as Foss
- Eliyha Altena as Kai
- Quinty Trustfull as Queen Mira
- Celine Van de Voorde as Riva
- Alex Gasperetti as Villager
- Kurt Laferla as Villager

=== Minor ===
- Stan van Veen
