= Zet 'm op! =

Single by Lisa, Amy & Shelley

from the album 300%
- Released: May 2008
- Recorded: 2007
- Genre: Pop
- Length: 3:06
- Label: Dino Music; EMI
- Songwriters: Johannes Keuken, Jacobus Kwakman & Jacobus Shilder

Lisa, Amy & Shelley singles chronology
"Adem in, adem uit" (2007)	"Zet 'm op!" (2008)	"Strand" (2008)

"Zet 'm op!" is a single by the Dutch three-piece girl group Lisa, Amy & Shelley. It was released in the Netherlands as a digital download in May 2008, the second single from their first album 300% (2008). The song peaked at number 60 on the Dutch Singles Chart.

== Track listing ==
Digital download
No.	Title	Length
1.	"Zet 'm op!"	3:06

== Chart performance ==
Chart (2008)	Peak position
Netherlands (Single Top 100)	60

== Release history ==
Region	Date	Format	Label
Netherlands	May 2008	Digital download; CD	Dino Music; EMI
