= Het lied van de zeemeermin =

Studio album by K3
- Released: 22 November 2024
- Recorded: 2024
- Genre: Pop
- Length: 55:00
- Label: Studio 100
- Producer: Studio 100

K3 chronology
Vleugels (2022)	Het lied van de zeemeermin (2024)

Singles from Het lied van de zeemeermin
- 1. "Fata Morgana" Released: 17 May 2023; 2. "Zomer van liefde(Summer of love)" Released: 29 May 2024; 3. "Het lied van de zeemeermin(The Mermaid's song)" Released: 16 October 2024

Het lied van de zeemeermin is the twenty-second studio album by the Belgian-Dutch music trio K3, released on 22 November 2024 by Studio 100. The album's first single, called Fata Morgana, had already been released almost a year earlier. (17 May 2023) The second single, Zomer van liefde, was released on 29 May 2024. The third single Het lied van de zeemeermin, which also serves as the title track, was released on 16 October 2024. The covers of K3 from the tenth season of Liefde Voor Muziek (Flemish version of The Best Singers) were also added to the album.

The album is also the soundtrack to the feature film K3 en Het Lied van de Zeemeermin.

== Track listing ==
All tracks are written by Alain Vande Putte

Het lied van de zeemeermin – Standard edition
No.	Title	Length
1.	"Het lied van de zeemeermin" (The Mermaid's song)	3:50
2.	"Zomer van liefde" (Summer of love)	3:40
3.	"K3 4-ever"	4:19
4.	"Jouw beste vriendin" (Your best friend)	3:24
5.	"Ben ik dan zo anders" (Am I so different)	4:26
6.	"Canta lysinga"	3:19
7.	"Vakantie" (Holiday)	6:34
8.	"Liefde is een eiland" (Love is an island)	3:31
9.	"Fata Morgana"	3:58
10.	"Kinderen van de regenboog" (Children of the rainbow)	3:28
11.	"Zomerlijf" (Summer body)	3:45
12.	"Beest" (Beast)	2:58
13.	"Jij bent" (You are)	3:08
14.	"Vanbinnen" (Inside)	3:42
15.	"Hoofd in de wolken" (Head in the clouds)	3:35
16.	"Labo van liefde" (Labo of love)	3:42
17.	"Adem" (Breathe)	3:07
Total length:		55:00

== Charts ==
Chart (2024)	Peak position
Belgian Albums (Ultratop Flanders)	1
Dutch Albums (Album Top 100)	11
