= Klaasje Meijer =

Dutch singer, actress, television presenter and flautist

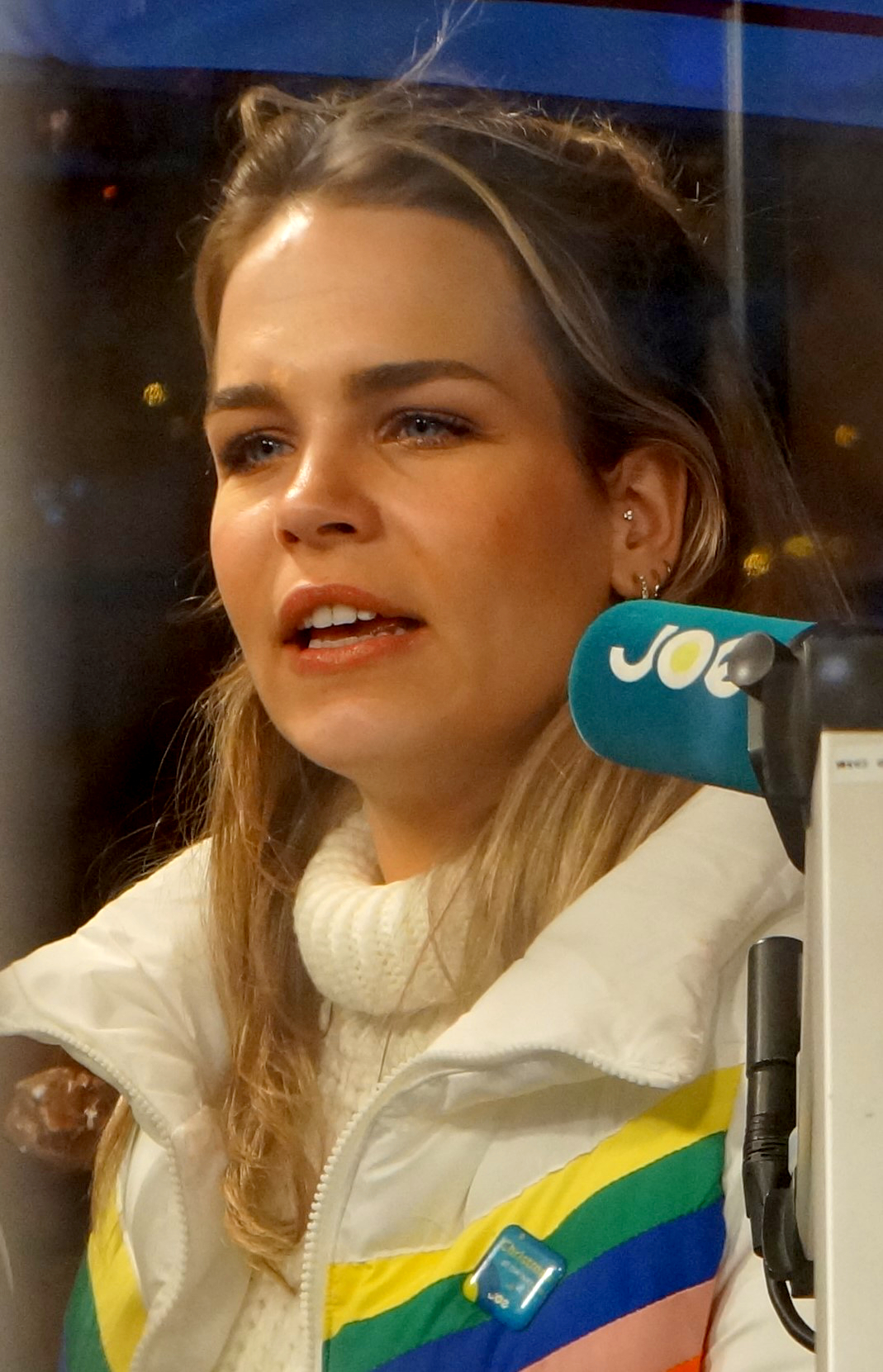
- Meijer in 2019

Background information
- Born: Klaasje Ietje Meijer; 2 March 1995 (age 31); Lutjegast, Netherlands
- Genres: Pop, classic
- Occupations: Singer; Actor; flautist; television personality
- Instruments: Vocals, flute
- Years active: 2015–present
- Label: Studio 100
- Website: www.klaasjemeijer.nl

Klaasje Ietje (Alieke) Meijer (born 2 March 1995) is a Dutch singer, actor, television presenter and flautist. Her rise to fame came as one of the members of the Belgian-Dutch girl group K3, where she sang from 2015 until 2021.

== Early life ==
Meijer was born in the village of Lutjegast in Province of Groningen as the eldest child of a Dutch reformed vicar and a music teacher. She was named after her maternal grandmother, but acquired the nickname Alieke. Throughout her childhood and college time, she was known by family and friends as Alieke Meijer. As a child, she frequently moved across the country as a result of her father's profession. The family initially lived in Nieuwendijk in Noord-Brabant, but moved to 's-Gravenzande, where she completed her VWO certificate. She applied to the Conservatorium van Amsterdam, where she started studying classical music and flute, but later quit her studies.

== Career ==
During her childhood, Meijer alongside her mother and younger sisters performed in a group together known locally as the Meijer Quintet. They performed at weddings and anniversaries. At the age of 16, she was featured on the Zapp programme Kinderen voor Kinderen Klinkklaar as a singer-songwriter because she had made a cover of the choir's song "Meidengroep". As a flautist at the Conservatorium van Amsterdam, she performed a composition of a twelve-year-old composer that later won the audience and first prize in the Prinses Christina Concours in 2015.

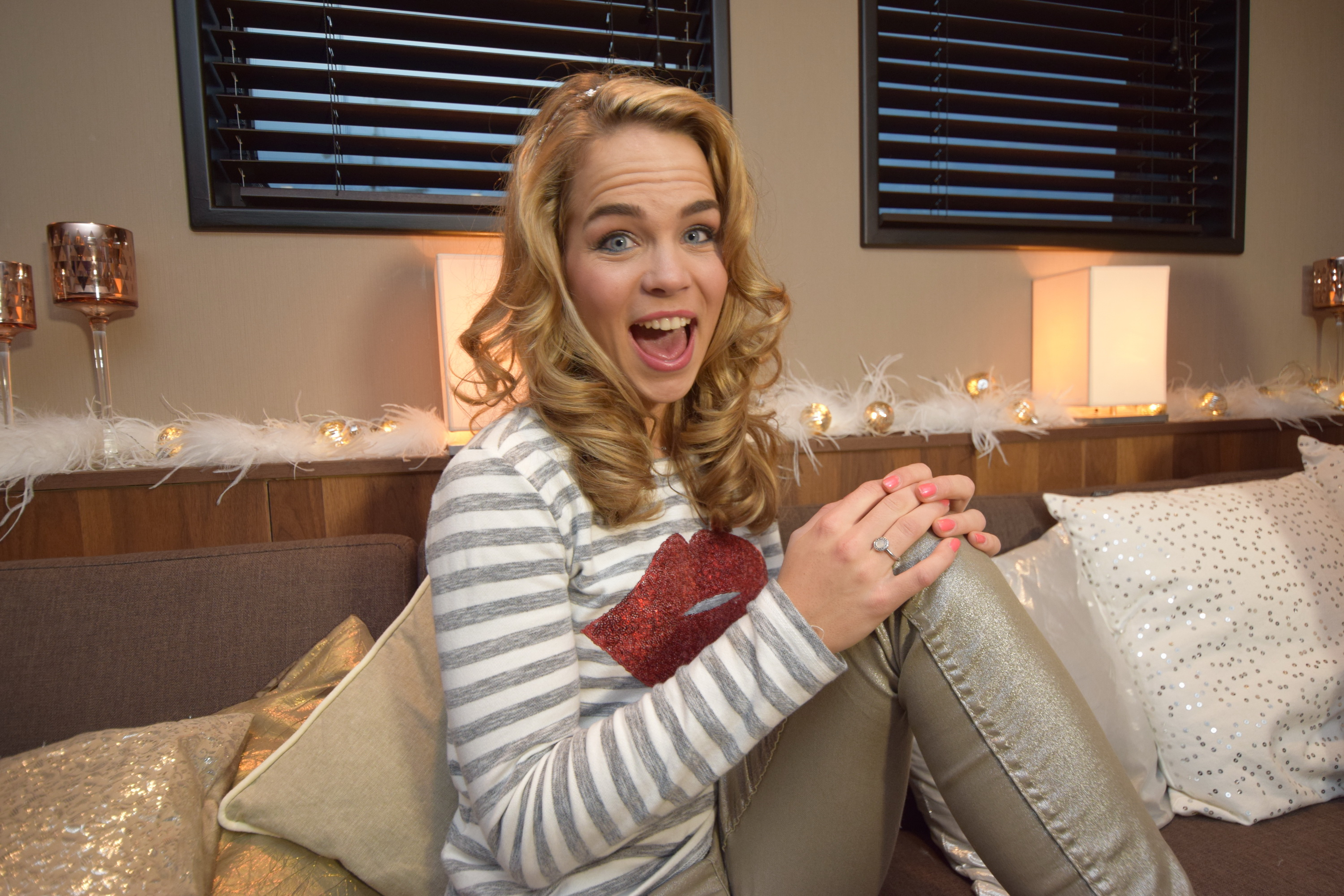
Meijer in 2015

In early 2015, Meijer auditioned for K3 Zoekt K3 (K3 seeks K3), a television talent show that sought to replace Karen Damen, Kristel Verbeke and Josje Huisman as the outgoing members of the pop group K3. In the final of 6 November 2015, she became the new blonde member of the group. With red-haired member Hanne Verbruggen and black-haired Marthe De Pillecyn, Meijer completed the new line-up of K3. She decided to continue with her official name Klaasje from now on and moved to Belgium, Antwerp, for K3. At the beginning of 2020, she moved back to the Netherlands, Rotterdam to live with her boyfriend.

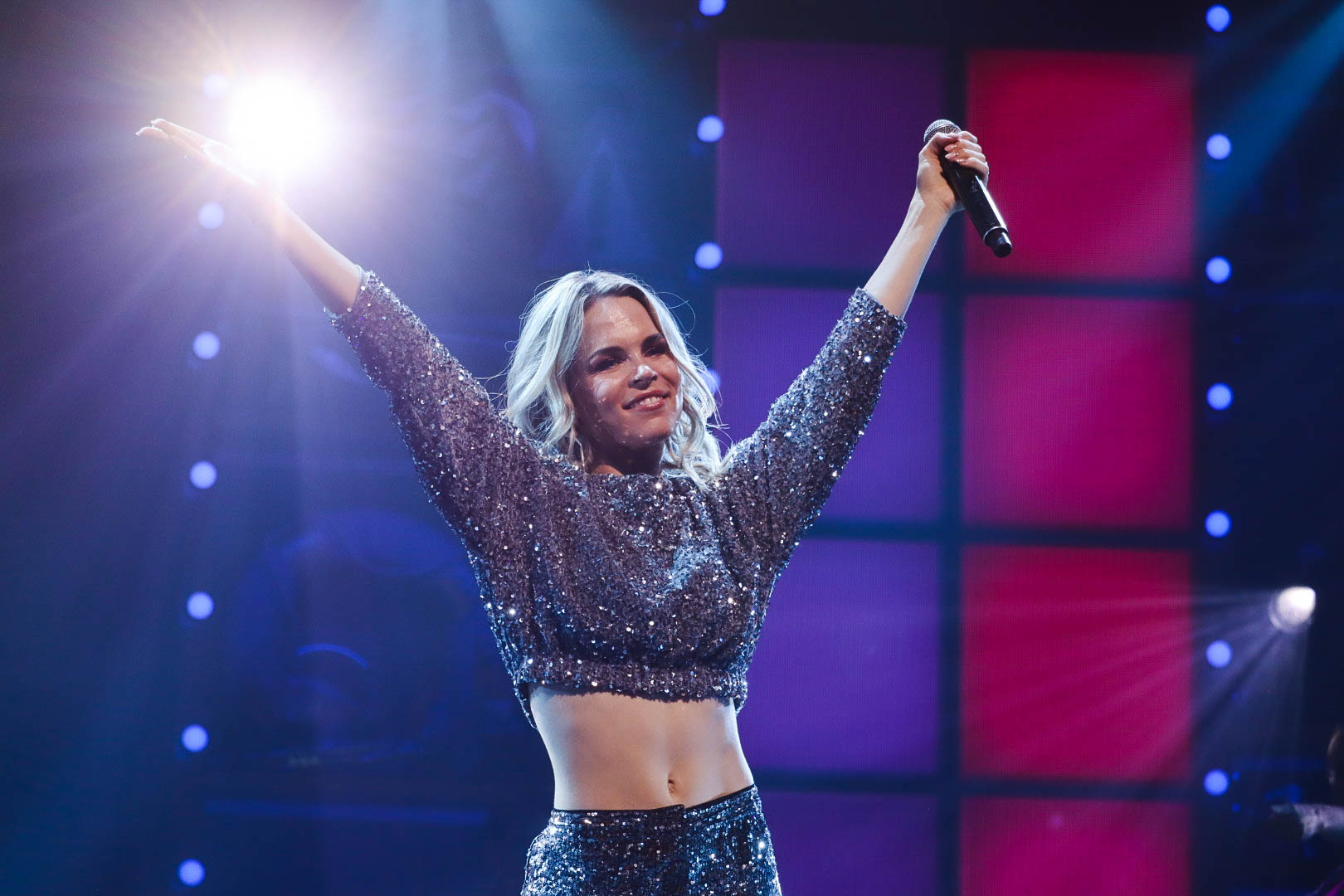
Meijer during her last show with K3

On 9 February 2021, Gert Verhulst and K3 announced during a press conference that Meijer had decided to leave the group. She did indicate that she would certainly stay with K3 for another year. Her successor was appointed by a talent show on Flemish and Dutch television: K2 zoekt K3 (K2 seeks K3). The winner and successor became Julia Boschman.

In 2021, Meijer appeared in De Slimste Mens Ter Wereld, but was eliminated after one episode. She subsequently took part in the SBS6 reality game show The Big Balance, in which celebrities challenge each other on slacklining, with the main challenge in the final to slackline across the Johan Cruijff Arena. Meijer won the final of the show on New Year's Day in 2022, being the only celeb to be able to fully cross the stadium.

In 2022, she was the Scorpion on the second season of The Masked Singer in Flanders. Meijer debuted as Jitske in her first solo acting role in the film Boeien!. She performed a Grease medley at the Kinderprinsengrachtconcert in August 2022. In 2023, she appeared in the Dutch television game show Alles is Muziek.

== Personal life ==
Meijer is in a relationship with lawyer Max van Geest. They got married in October 2024.

== Filmography ==
Film
Year	Film	Role	Notes
2017	K3 Love Cruise	Klaasje	K3 theater movies, main role
2020	K3 Dans van de Farao	Klaasje	K3 theater movies, main role
2022	Boeien!	Jitske	Assistant to the captain
2024	200% WOLF	Batty	Street dog, voice
Television
Year	Title	Role	Notes
2015	K3 zoekt K3	Candidate	Winner together with Hanne Verbruggen and Marthe De Pillecyn
2015–2021	K3 - Muziekclips	Herself	
2015	Welkom bij K3	Herself	
2016	Dit is K3	Herself	
2016	Wij zijn K3	Herself	
2016	Is er Wifi in Tahiti?	Candidate	Together with Hanne Verbruggen and Marthe De Pillecyn
2016	De avonturen van K3	Klaasje	Voice
2016–2017	Iedereen K3	Presenter	
2016–2017	K3 Dansstudio	Presenter	
2016	2 Meisjes op het Strand	Presenter	
2016–2017	Radio 2 Zomerhit	Candidate	Together with Hanne Verbruggen and Marthe De Pillecyn
2016–2018	Het dagboek van K3	Herself	
2017–2021	K3 Vlogt	Herself	
2017	Tegen de Sterren op	Herself	
2017	Camping Karen & James	Herself	
2017	Overal K3	Herself	
2017	Wedden dat ik het kan	Herself	
2017	Knoop Gala	Herself	
2018	De tafel van K3	Presenter	
2018–2020	The Voice Kids (Flanders)	Judge/coach	Together with Hanne Verbruggen and Marthe De Pillecyn
2018	Zet 'm op!	Herself	
2018–2020	K3 Roller Disco	Klaasje	
2019	K3 Dromen	Klaasie	
2020	Het Rad	Herself	
2020, 2022	Code van Coppens	Candidate	Together with Hanne Verbruggen and Marthe De Pillecyn (2020) and with Lize Feryn (2022)
2020	K3 Roller Disco Club	Presenter	
2021	Ik weet er alles van!	Candidate	
2021	De Slimste Mens ter Wereld	Candidate	
2021	The Big Balance	Candidate	Winner
2021	K2 zoekt K3	Herself	
2022	The Masked Singer (Flanders)	Candidate	As Scorpio (7 episodes)
2022	Code van Coppens: De wraak van de Belgen	Candidate	Together with Gers Pardoel
2023	Avastars	Virtual character Kioko	Together with Valery Bouwknegt (4 episodes)
2023	Alles is Muziek	Candidate	
2023	Secret Duets	Secret singer	
2023	De Verraders	Traitor	
2023	The Big Bang (Flanders)	Candidate	Together with Loïc van Impe
2023	The Big Bang (Netherlands)	Candidate	Together with Gers Pardoel
2023	De Verraders: De Ronde Tafel	Herself	
