= We Got This (Ogene album) =

Studio album by O'G3NE
- Released: 30 September 2016
- Recorded: 2014–15
- Genre: Pop
- Label: BMG

O'G3NE chronology
Sweet 16 (2011)	We Got This (2016)	Straight to You (2019)

Singles from We Got This
- 1. "Take the Money and Run" Released: 29 April 2016; 2. "Loved You First" Released: 16 September 2016

Singles from We Got This (Special Edition)
- 1. "Lights and Shadows" Released: 3 March 2017

We Got This is the third studio album by Dutch three-piece girl group O'G3NE. It was released in the Netherlands on 30 September 2016 by BMG. The album peaked at number 1 on the Dutch Albums Chart. The album was re-released on 28 April 2017 and included their Eurovision song "Lights and Shadows".

== Singles ==
"Take the Money and Run" was released as the lead single from the album on 29 April 2016. The song peaked at number 30 on the Dutch Singles Chart. "Loved You First" was released as the second single from the album on 16 September 2016. "Lights and Shadows" was released as the lead single from the re-released album on 3 March 2017. The song peaked at number 53 on the Dutch Singles Chart. On 29 October 2016, AVROTROS announced that O'G3NE will represent the Netherlands at the 2017 Eurovision Song Contest. The Netherlands will compete in the second semi-final at the Eurovision Song Contest.

== Track listing ==
Standard listing
No.	Title	Length
1.	"Loved You First"	4:00
2.	"Cross Faded"	3:11
3.	"Outta My Head"	3:07
4.	"All Over Again"	3:11
5.	"Wait a Minute"	2:44
6.	"Satellite"	3:30
7.	"What You Do"	3:00
8.	"Hold Me Tight"	3:16
9.	"Take the Money and Run" (bonus track)	2:44

Special edition
No.	Title	Length
1.	"Lights and Shadows"	3:01
2.	"Loved You First"	4:00
3.	"Cross Faded"	3:12
4.	"Outta My Head"	3:08
5.	"All Over Again"	3:12
6.	"Wait a Minute"	2:44
7.	"Satellite"	3:30
8.	"What You Do"	3:02
9.	"Hold Me Tight"	3:16
10.	"Take the Money and Run" (Bonus Track)	2:46
11.	"Lights and Shadows" (Acoustic Version)	3:04
12.	"Clown"	3:49
13.	"Magic"	2:56

== Charts ==
=== Weekly charts ===
Chart (2016–17)	Peak position
Belgian Albums (Ultratop Flanders)	86
Dutch Albums (Album Top 100)	1

=== Year-end charts ===
Chart (2016)	Position
Dutch Albums (Album Top 100)	39
Chart (2017)	Position
Dutch Albums (Album Top 100)	51

== Release history ==
Region	Date	Format	Label
Netherlands	30 September 2016	Digital download, CD	BMG
Netherlands	28 April 2017	Digital download, CD	BMG
