= Ogene (group) =

Dutch music group

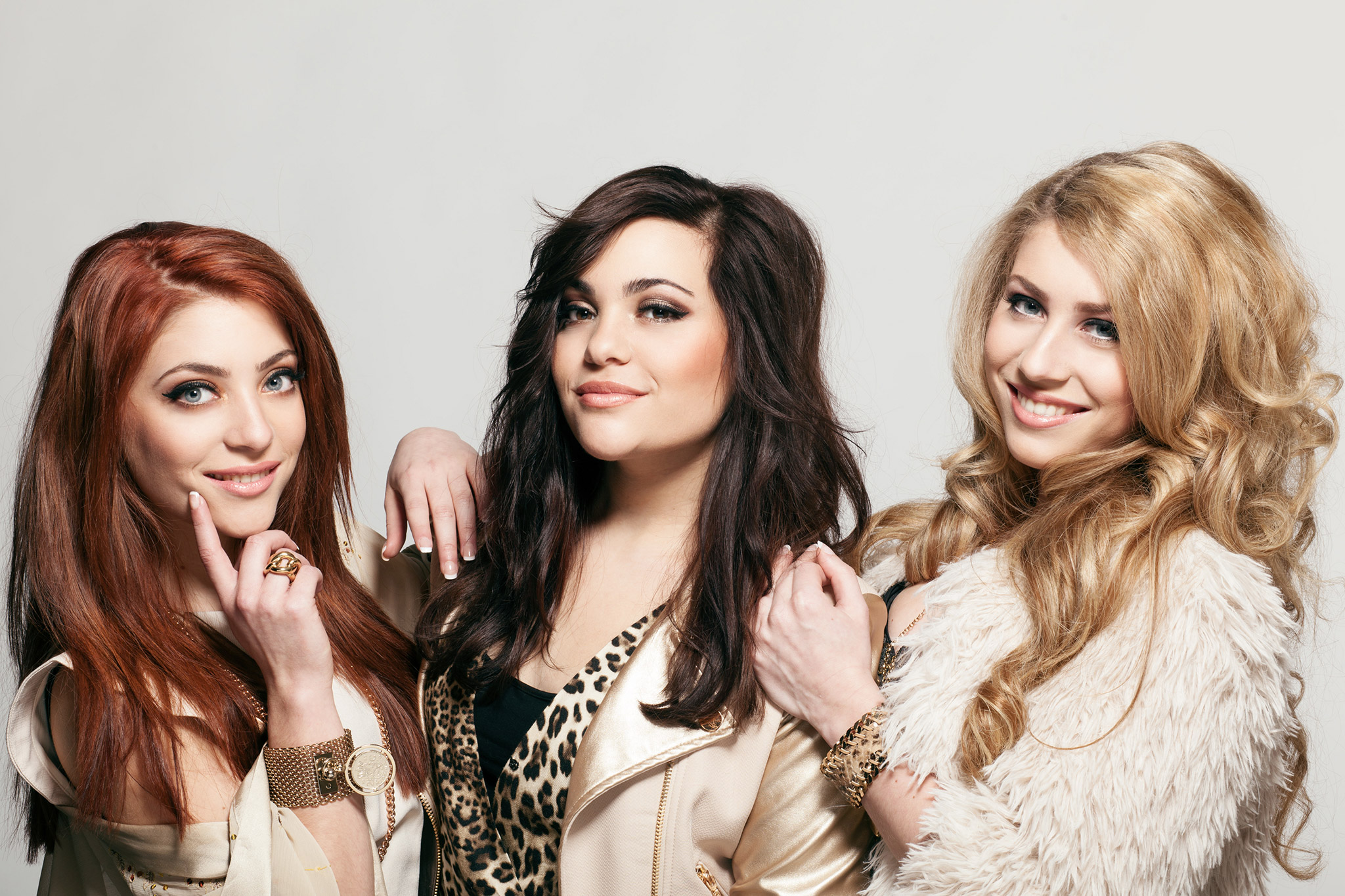
- Ogene in 2014, left to right: Amy, Shelley and Lisa

Background information
- Also known as: Lisa, Amy & Shelley; OG3NE
- Origin: Fijnaart, Netherlands
- Genres: Pop; R&B
- Years active: 2007–present
- Label: BMG
- Members: Lisa Vol; Amy Vol; Shelley Vol

Ogene (/oʊˈdʒiːn/ oh-JEEN; stylised as OG3NE and O'G3NE until 2024), formerly known as Lisa, Amy & Shelley, is a Dutch three-piece vocal group made up of sisters Lisa, Amy and Shelley Vol. The group first rose to prominence representing the Netherlands in the Junior Eurovision Song Contest 2007 with the song "Adem in, adem uit". In 2014, they won the fifth season of The Voice of Holland, becoming the first trio to win any international edition of The Voice. Ogene later returned to the Eurovision stage as the Dutch entry for the Eurovision Song Contest 2017 with the song "Lights and Shadows", reaching the final and finishing in eleventh place.

== Early life ==
Lisa Roxanne Vol was born on 21 June 1994, while twins Amy Talitha Vol and Shelley Celine Vol were born on 18 October 1995. The sisters were born in Dordrecht, South Holland, and grew up in Fijnaart, North Brabant. Their father is music producer Rick Vol, who has also written songs for his daughters. They are the cousins of former Why Don't We member Corbyn Besson.

== Career ==
=== 2007–2011: 300% and Sweet 16 ===
In 2007, they won the Junior Songfestival with their self-written song "Adem in, adem uit", earning a maximum score of 36 points in the semi-final and final. They went on to represent the Netherlands at the Junior Eurovision Song Contest 2007 in Rotterdam, where they placed eleventh out of seventeen. The following year, they released an album titled 300% and later released another album titled Sweet 16 in 2011.

=== 2014–2016: The Voice of Holland and breakthrough ===
After a three-year hiatus following the release of their second studio album, the group revamped their artistic identity and participated in the blind auditions of season five of The Voice of Holland. The group's new name, Ogene (initially stylised as O'G3NE), was chosen as a reference to their mother's blood type and their shared genes. They performed "Emotion" and had all four judges turn their chairs for them, eventually joining Marco Borsato's team. They went on to win the competition, becoming the first group to do so.

The Voice of Holland performances and results
Stage	Song	Original Artist	Date	Result
Blind Audition	"Emotion"	Destiny's Child	12 September 2014	Joined team Marco Borsato
Battle Rounds	"I See Fire" (vs. Gabriella Massa)	Ed Sheeran	24 October 2014	Saved by coach
The Clashes	"Mirrors" (vs. Abigail Martina)	Justin Timberlake	21 November 2014	Saved by public
The Clashes	"Story of My Life" (vs. Abigail Martina)	One Direction	21 November 2014	Saved by public
Live Show	"Buttons"	The Pussycat Dolls	28 November 2014	Saved by public
Live Show	"Change Will Come"	Alain Clark	5 December 2014	Saved by public
Semi-Final	"Hold On"	Wilson Phillips	12 December 2014	Saved by public
Semi-Final	"Magic"	Ogene	12 December 2014	Saved by public
Final	"Change Will Come" (with Alain Clark)	Alain Clark	19 December 2014	Saved by public
Final	"Emotion"	Destiny's Child	19 December 2014	Saved by public
Final	"Magic"	Ogene	19 December 2014	Winner

In 2016, Ogene participated in the Dutch television show Beste Zangers. They released their third studio album, We Got This, on 30 September 2016, which peaked at number one on the Dutch Album Top 100.

=== 2017: Eurovision Song Contest ===
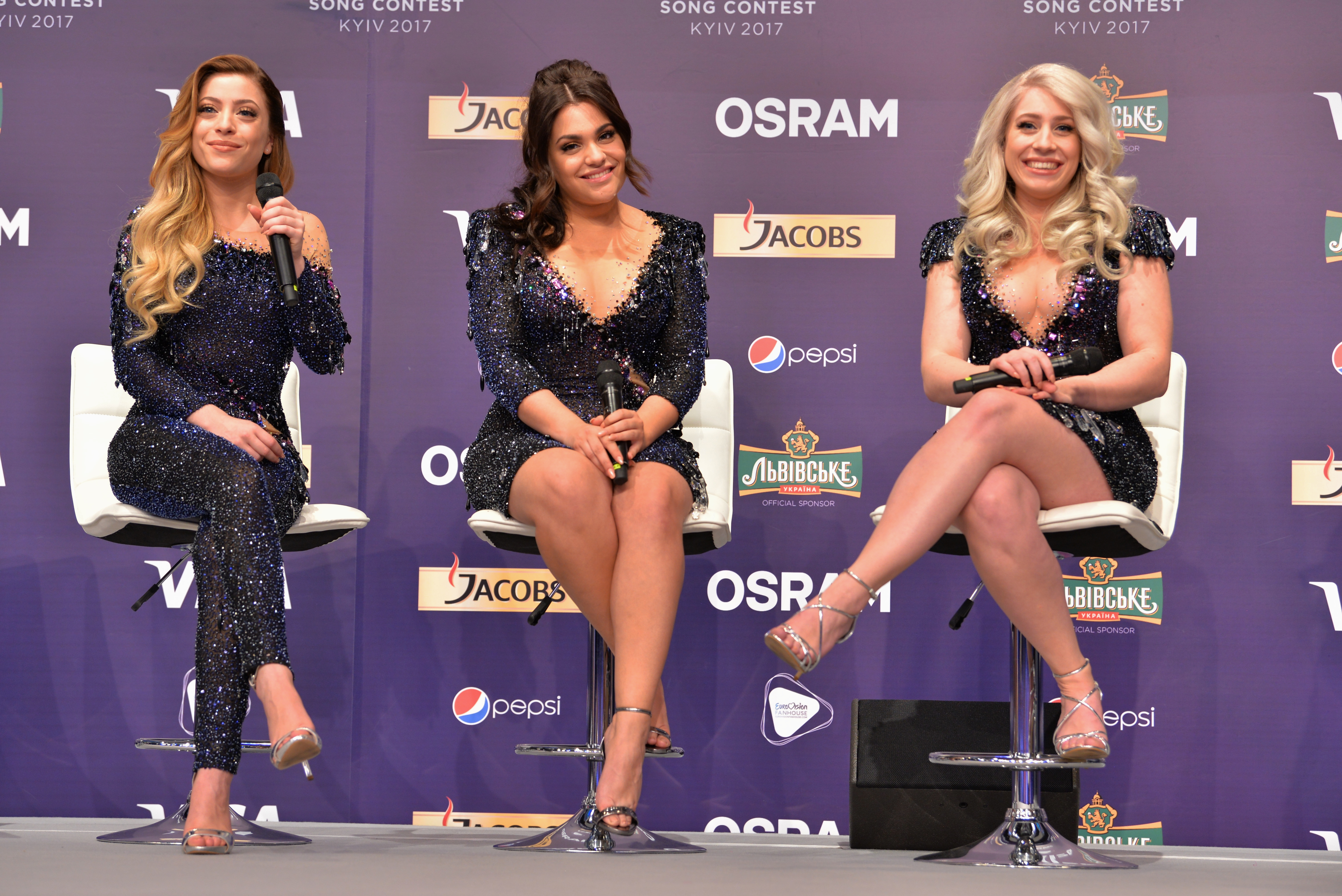
Ogene at the Eurovision Song Contest 2017 in Kyiv

After much speculation, it was revealed on 29 October 2016 that Ogene would be representing the Netherlands at the Eurovision Song Contest 2017 in Kyiv, Ukraine. Their entry, "Lights and Shadows", was released on 3 March 2017. They qualified from the semifinals and ultimately placed eleventh in the final, scoring 150 points.

== Discography ==
- 300% (2008) – as Lisa, Amy & Shelley
- Sweet 16 (2011) – as Lisa, Amy & Shelley
- We Got This (2016)

Awards and achievements
Preceded by Kimberly with "Goed"	Netherlands in the Junior Eurovision Song Contest; 2007	Succeeded by Marissa with "1 dag"
Preceded by Julia van der Toorn	Winner of The Voice of Holland; Season five (2014)	Succeeded by Maan de Steenwinkel
Preceded by Douwe Bob with "Slow Down"	Netherlands in the Eurovision Song Contest; 2017	Succeeded by Waylon with "Outlaw in 'Em"
