= The Masked Singer (Belgian TV series) season 4 =

The Masked Singer
- Season 4
- Starring: Aaron Blommaert; Boris Van Severen; Elisabeth Lucie Baeten; Erik Van Looy; Frances Lefebure; Ruth Beeckmans; Tine Embrechts; Véronique De Kock
- Hosted by: Jens Dendoncker
- Winner: Francisco Schuster as "Labradoodle"
- Runner-up: Gustaph as "Phoenix"
- No. of episodes: 12

Release
- Original network: VTM
- Original release: 20 September – 6 December 2024

Season chronology
- ← Previous; Season 3 Next → Season 5

The fourth season of The Masked Singer based on the Masked Singer franchise which originated from the South Korean version of the show King of Mask Singer. It premiered on VTM on 20 September 2024 and is hosted again by Jens Dendoncker.

The season had a first in the Belgian series and featured for the first time a masked guest singer, multiple-time cyclocross world champion Wout Van Aert. Also for the first time in this Belgian series, a fictional character participated. This was the television dog Samson who participated with his fictional owner Marie. For the second time, an international artist participated, Ruslana, who was unmasked just before the semifinals. The winner of the season was Francisco Schuster as 'Labradoodle'.

== Production ==
After three successful seasons, it was quickly apparent that The Masked Singer would return for a fourth season. For the first time, a contest was organized to create a costume for the new series. The winning design, Mister Withlove, was designed by an eleven-year-old girl named Fiona, and featured in the first episode of the series.

The filming took place in May 2024. The jury was presented in August 2024, and consisted mainly of a mix of contestants from the previous three seasons.

== Cast ==
=== Panelists ===
Panel members Ruth Beeckmans and Tine Embrechts returned.

Aaron Blommaert, Boris Van Severen, Erik Van Looy and Véronique De Kock who participated at the previous seasons as masked singers, joined the panel. Elisabeth Lucie Baeten and Frances Lefebure were new members. Of this group of 8 judges, a few of them would be selected for each episode.

Color key
Featured in this episode as a judge.

The Masked Singer Judges
Judge	Episodes											
Judge	1	2	3	4	5	6	7	8	9	10	11	12
Aaron Blommaert												
Boris Van Severen												
Elisabeth Lucie Baeten												
Erik Van Looy												
Véronique De Kock												
Tine Embrichts												
Ruth Beekmans												
Frances Lefebure												
Guest Judge	Olga Leyers	Fien Germijns	William Boeva	Dany Verstraeten	Jeroom Snelders	Lynn Van den Broeck		Kelly Pfaff-Gooris	Manu Van Acker			

== Contestants ==
Some costumes were revealed through actions during the first weeks of September. On September 10, 2024, the first 12 contestants were presented. Additional characters Poppemie and Labradoodle participated for the first time in the third and fourth episodes, respectively. One-time guest participant Squirrel appeared in the fifth episode.

Once again a duo participated, this time best friends Joris Hessels and Dominique Van Malder. During Space Babe's first appearance in the second episode, it was made surprisingly clear that she is a duo with her spacecraft, Scooter, so there were two duos participating this season.

The participants again started in two groups of which unmasking happened in turn in group one. In the seventh episode, the remaining four contestants from each group in the Big Bang were merged into a group of eight masked singers. The bell of truth (bel van de waarheid) appeared in the ninth episode. As a result, a video of a prime suspect of a masked singer appeared, allowing it to be removed from the list of possible candidates.

There was a one-off appearance by a masked singer. This celebrity was unable to make more time due to his schedule. Between the two episodes of his participation, the identity of this singer was much discussed on social media. This was Wout Van Aert, multiple world cyclocross champion, which got a lot of attention in the press.

Stage name	Celebrity	Occupation	Episodes											
Stage name	Celebrity	Occupation	1	2	3	4	5	6	7	8	9	10	11	12
Labradoodle (WC)	Francisco Schuster	Actor/Singer				WIN		SAFE	WIN	WIN	WIN	SAFE	SAFE	WINNER
Feniks ("Phoenix")	Gustaph	Singer		WIN		WIN		SAFE	WIN	RISK	WIN	SAFE	SAFE	RUNNER-UP
Poppemie ("Doll") (WC)	Nathalie Meskens	Actress/Singer			WIN		SAFE		WIN	RISK	RISK	SAFE	SAFE	THIRD
Medusa	Linda Mertens	Singer	WIN		WIN		RISK		RISK	WIN	WIN	RISK	OUT	
Zeeduivel ("Monkfish")	Ruslana	Singer	WIN		WIN		SAFE		WIN	WIN	RISK	OUT		
Giraf ("Giraffe")	James Cooke	TV presenter/actor	WIN		RISK		WIN		RISK	RISK	OUT			
Zebra	Céline Van Ouytsel	Miss Belgium/Blogger		RISK		WIN		WIN	RISK	OUT				
Space Babe	Samson en Marie	Music duo		WIN		RISK		RISK	OUT					
Dame Blanche	Zita Wauters	Actress		RISK		RISK		OUT						
Tik & Tok	Joris Hessels	Radio presenter	RISK		RISK		OUT							
Tik & Tok	Dominique Van Malder	Actor	RISK		RISK		OUT							
Eikeltje ("Acorn")	Frank Verstraeten	Disc jockey		WIN		OUT								
Boom ("Tree")	Wim De Vilder	News anchor	RISK		OUT									
De Mike ("The Mike")	Hugo Sigal	Singer		OUT										
Mister Withlove	Karl Vannieuwkerke	Journalist	OUT											
Eekhoorn (Squirrel)	Wout Van Aert	Road and cyclo-cross racer					GUEST							

The masked singer was safe from elimination.
The masked singer won their face-off, and remained in the competition.
The masked singer lost their face-off, but was not eliminated.
The masked singer was eliminated from the competition, and was unmasked upon their elimination.
The masked singer did not perform.
The masked singer won the competition.
The masked singer finished second.
The masked singer finished third.

== Episodes ==
=== Episode 1 (20 September) ===
- Group number: "What I Like About You" by The Romantics

Performances on the first episode
#	Stage name	Song	Identity	Result
1	Tik & Tok	"I Wanna Be Your Slave" by Måneskin	undisclosed	RISK
2	Giraffe	"We've Got It Goin' On" by Backstreet Boys	undisclosed	WIN
3	Tree	"Relax" by Frankie Goes To Hollywood	undisclosed	RISK
4	Monkfish	"Listen To Your Heart" by Roxette	undisclosed	WIN
5	Mister Withlove	"Copacabana" by Barry Manilow	Karl Vannieuwkerke	OUT
6	Medusa	"Uninvited" by Alanis Morissette	undisclosed	WIN

=== Episode 2 (27 September) ===
- Group number: "Came Here For Love" by Sigala & Ella Eyre

Performances on the second episode
#	Stage name	Song	Identity	Result
1	Zebra	"Dance the Night" by Dua Lipa	undisclosed	RISK
2	Space Babe	"For You" by Liam Payne & Rita Ora	undisclosed	WIN
3	The Mike	"Substitution" by Kungs & Purple Disco Machine	Hugo Sigal	OUT
4	Phoenix	"Holding Out For A Hero" by Adam Lambert	undisclosed	WIN
5	Dame Blanche	"Padam Padam" by Kylie Minogue	undisclosed	RISK
6	Acorn	"The Hum" by Dimitri Vegas & Like Mike	undisclosed	WIN

=== Episode 3 (4 October) ===
Performances on the third episode
#	Stage name	Song	Identity	Result
1	Giraffe	"She Bangs" by Ricky Martin	undisclosed	RISK
Wildcard	Doll	"What Was I Made For?" by Billie Eilish	undisclosed	WIN
3	Medusa	"Is It Love" by Loreen	undisclosed	WIN
4	Tree	"Heaven" by Niall Horan	Wim De Vilder	OUT
5	Tik & Tok	"Especially For You" by Jason Donovan & Kylie Minogue	undisclosed	RISK
6	Monkfish	"Bring Me To Life" by Evanescence	undisclosed	WIN

=== Episode 4 (11 October) ===
Performances on the fourth episode
#	Stage name	Song	Identity	Result
1	Phoenix	"yes, and?" by Ariana Grande	undisclosed	WIN
2	Acorn	"Satisfaction" by Benny Benassi	Frank Verstraeten	OUT
3	Dame Blanche	"Me Too" by Meghan Trainor	undisclosed	RISK
4	Zebra	"Murder on the Dancefloor" by Sophie Ellis-Bextor	undisclosed	WIN
5	Space Babe	"Scream & Shout" by will.i.am & Britney Spears	undisclosed	RISK
Wildcard	Labradoodle	"Are You Gonna Go My Way" by Lenny Kravitz	undisclosed	WIN

=== Episode 5 (18 October) ===
- Guest Performance: Squirrel (Guest Mask) performs "Song 2" by Blur

Performances on the fifth episode
#	Stage name	Song	Identity	Result
1	Medusa	"Houdini" by Dua Lipa	undisclosed	RISK
2	Giraffe	"Control" by Zoe Wees	undisclosed	WIN
3	Monkfish	"Don't Stop The Music" by Rihanna	undisclosed	SAFE
4	Tik & Tok	"Alexandrie, Alexandra" by Claude François	Joris Hessels	OUT
4	Tik & Tok	"Alexandrie, Alexandra" by Claude François	Dominique Van Malder	OUT
5	Doll	"Titanium" by David Guetta & Sia	undisclosed	SAFE
1	Medusa	"Don't Leave Me This Way" by Thelma Houston		
2	Tik & Tok	"Don't Leave Me This Way" by Thelma Houston		

=== Episode 6 (25 October) ===
Performances on the sixth episode
#	Stage name	Song	Identity	Result
1	Dame Blanche	"Green Light" by Lorde	Zita Wauters	OUT
2	Labradoodle	"Used To Be Young" by Miley Cyrus	undisclosed	SAFE
3	Phoenix	"Crazy In Love (Fifty Shades of Grey Remix)" by Beyoncé	undisclosed	SAFE
4	Zebra	"Dat Heb Jij Gedaan" by Meau	undisclosed	WIN
5	Space Babe	"(I've Had) The Time Of My Life" by Bill Medley & Jennifer Warnes	undisclosed	RISK
1	Dame Blanche	"Jump (For My Love)" by Pointer Sisters		
2	Space Babe	"Jump (For My Love)" by Pointer Sisters		

=== Episode 7 (1 November) ===
Performances on the seventh episode
#	Stage name	Song	Identity	Result
1	Phoenix	"The Door" by Teddy Swims	undisclosed	WIN
2	Giraffe	"Yeah 3x" by Chris Brown	undisclosed	RISK
3	Monkfish	"Please Forgive Me" by Bryan Adams	undisclosed	WIN
4	Zebra	"On The Floor" by Jennifer Lopez	undisclosed	RISK
5	Doll	"Tattoo" by Loreen	undisclosed	WIN
6	Space Babe	"Rasputin" by Boney M.	Samson en Marie	OUT
7	Labradoodle	"Where Have You Been" by Rihanna	undisclosed	WIN
8	Medusa	"My Immortal" by Evanescence	undisclosed	RISK

=== Episode 8 (8 November) ===
Performances on the eighth episode
#	Stage name	Song	Identity	Result
1	Phoenix	"Push Up" by Freestylers	undisclosed	RISK
2	Labradoodle	"Beautiful Things" by Benson Boone	undisclosed	WIN
3	Giraffe	"Lady Marmalade" by Christina Aguilera, Mýa, P!nk, & Lil' Kim	undisclosed	RISK
4	Zebra	"Your Song" by Elton John	Céline Van Ouytsel	OUT
5	Medusa	"Burnin' Up" by Jessie J ft. 2 Chainz	undisclosed	WIN
6	Doll	"Turning Tables" by Adele	undisclosed	RISK
7	Monkfish	"Move Your Body" by Sia	undisclosed	WIN

=== Episode 9 (15 November) ===
Performances on the ninth episode
#	Stage name	Song	Identity	Result
1	Phoenix	"Love Me Again" by John Newman	undisclosed	WIN
2	Monkfish	"Nothing Compares 2 U" by Sinéad O'Connor	undisclosed	RISK
3	Doll	"Unwritten" by Natasha Bedingfield	undisclosed	RISK
4	Medusa	"Nutbush City Limits" by Tina Turner	undisclosed	WIN
5	Giraffe	"In The Stars" by Benson Boone	undisclosed	RISK
6	Labradoodle	"Freed from Desire" by Gala Rizzatto	undisclosed	WIN
Sing-off details
1	Monkfish	"Heaven Is A Place On Earth" by Belinda Carlisle	undisclosed	SAFE
2	Doll	"Heaven Is A Place On Earth" by Belinda Carlisle	undisclosed	SAFE
3	Giraffe	"Heaven Is A Place On Earth" by Belinda Carlisle	James Cooke	OUT

=== Episode 10 (22 November) ===
The masked singers were given a duet partner in the tenth episode.

Performances on the tenth episode
#	Stage name	Song	Duet partner	Identity	Result
1	Phoenix	"De Wereld Draait Voor Jou" by Niels Destadsbader & Regi Penxten	Niels Destadsbader	undisclosed	SAFE
2	Medusa	"Light of My Life" by Belle Perez	Belle Perez	undisclosed	RISK
3	Monkfish	"Sisters Are Doin' It For Themselves" by Natalia & The Pointer Sisters	Natalia	undisclosed	RISK
4	Labradoodle	"Simple Life" by Stan Van Samang	Stan Van Samang	undisclosed	SAFE
5	Doll	"I'm On Fire/Lift U Up" by 2 Fabiola	2 Fabiola	undisclosed	SAFE
Sing-off details
1	Medusa	"Stargazing" by Myles Smith	N/A	undisclosed	SAFE
2	Monkfish	"Stargazing" by Myles Smith	N/A	Ruslana	OUT

=== Episode 11 (29 November) ===
Each contestant performed two songs. Two contestants were saved from elimination by the judges, one contestant was saved by the audience. The remaining contestant was unmasked.

Performances on the eleventh episode
#	Stage name	Song	Identity	Result
1	Doll	"Hurt" by Christina Aguilera	undisclosed	SAFE
1	Doll	"Break Free" by Ariana Grande ft. Zedd	undisclosed	SAFE
2	Labradoodle	"Lose Control" by Teddy Swims	undisclosed	SAFE
2	Labradoodle	"Turn Up The Music" by Chris Brown	undisclosed	SAFE
3	Medusa	"E.T." by Katy Perry	Linda Mertens	OUT
3	Medusa	"Running Up That Hill" by Within Temptation	Linda Mertens	OUT
4	Phoenix	"Texas Hold 'Em" by Beyoncé	undisclosed	SAFE
4	Phoenix	"Rise Like A Phoenix" by Conchita Wurst	undisclosed	SAFE

=== Episode 12 (6 December) - Finale ===
- Group number: "Spice Up Your Life" by Spice Girls

After each contestant performed two songs, two of them were saved by the audience and the third one was unmasked. The remaining two contestants went up against each other in a sing-off. The audience chose the winner, after which both the runner-up and the winner were unmasked.

Performances on the twelfth episode
#	Stage name	Song	Identity	Result
1	Doll	"Love Me Like You Do" by Ellie Goulding	Nathalie Meskens	THIRD
1	Doll	"What Was I Made For?" by Billie Eilish	Nathalie Meskens	THIRD
2	Phoenix	"I'd Do Anything for Love" by Meat Loaf	undisclosed	SAFE
2	Phoenix	"Love Me Again" by John Newman	undisclosed	SAFE
3	Labradoodle	"I Was Here" by Beyoncé	undisclosed	SAFE
3	Labradoodle	"Where Have You Been" by Rihanna	undisclosed	SAFE
Sing-off details
1	Phoenix	"The Winner Takes It All" by ABBA	Gustaph	RUNNER-UP
2	Labradoodle	"The Winner Takes It All" by ABBA	Francisco Schuster	WINNER
