= The Masked Singer (Belgian TV series) =

Television program in Belgium

- Also known as: The Masked Singer Belgium
- Genre: Reality competition
- Based on: King of Mask Singer by Munhwa Broadcasting Corporation
- Presented by: Niels Destadsbader (S1-2); Jens Dendoncker (S3-)
- Judges: Jens Dendoncker; Julie Van den Steen; Karen Damen; Andy Peelman; Kevin Janssens; Ruth Beeckmans; Bart Cannaerts; Tinne Embrechts
- Opening theme: "Who Are You" by The Who
- Country of origin: Belgium
- Original language: Dutch
- No. of seasons: 5
- No. of episodes: 54

Production
- Executive producer: Olivier Deprez
- Camera setup: Multi-camera
- Running time: ±80 minutes
- Production company: Fremantle Belgium

Original release
- Network: VTM
- Release: 18 September 2020 – present

The Masked Singer is a Belgian reality singing competition television series based on the Masked Singer franchise. It premiered on VTM on 18 September 2020. The first two series were hosted by Niels Destadsbader. The winner of the first series was Sandra Kim. The winner of the second series was Camille Dhont. The third and fourth series are hosted by Jens Dendoncker. Aaron Blommaert and Francisco Schuster won the following seasons. After four seasons in which a professional singer won, comedian Jade Mintens won the fifth season.

The second series premiered 14 January 2022 and ended on 18 March 2022. The third season started 3 January 2023. A live concert was announced. A fourth season started in the fall of 2024.

The program was the best-watched program in Flanders in 2020, 2022 and 2023. The fifth season was launched in fall 2025 and became the second most watched program in 2025.

== Format ==
The Belgian series followed the format of the South Korean version it was based on.

The series was a singing competition. Contestants had to sing and perform songs, and compete in duels against each other. The studio audience could vote for the best performance, giving this singer a pass for the next round. Singers who lost the duels had to face the jury and the studio audience again, until one singer remained. That singer had to leave the competition.

The singers were masked. The singers didn't wear masks only but specially made costumes that hide their faces and bodies completely. The real identity of the singer was masked and the singer received a new identity of the costume he was wearing. The singers looked like the character, behaved like the character and were named as the character. The voice of the singer was changed into the characters voice by using a voice changer. Only during the singing performance, the true voice of the singer could be heard.

The series was a guessing game. The judges and the home audience had to guess the true identity of the masked singers. Throughout the series, they got clues of the identity by the hints the singer gave during the pretaped mini-movies or after his performance. Sometimes there were clues hidden in the costumes.

== Production ==
=== Costs ===
Making The Masked Singer was expensive. What VTM paid to purchase the format remained secret. A channel pays the rights holder about 5 percent of their local production budget to purchase the format. One expert said that an episode of a studio show in Flanders costs between 250,000 and 400,000 euros. At the average of 325,000 euros per episode, you arrive at a production budget 3,900,000 euros for 12 episodes. In addition came the high costs for the costumes and the participation fee for the candidates. VTM was able to pay for the production thanks in part to many partnerships.

=== Recording ===
In January 2020, VTM announced that they would be producing a local series of the franchise. Normally, the series would have been recorded in March 2020, but recording was delayed by the COVID-19 pandemic. Recording started in June but with a limited audience. The judges were in the same group they could meet during the social restrictions because of COVID-19. After the final of the first season at 6 November 2020, VTM confirmed a second season. This season was recorded during the summer of 2022.

=== Design ===
Lightning expert Michiel Milbou, executive producer Olivier Deprez, director Maryse Van den Wyngaert and set designer Koen Verbrugghe designed the set. The only certainty were two giant masks, left and right, as entrances to the stage. The production was commended by The Economic Times for the set design and the clever use of lighting to give the impression there was a bigger audience. It was named one of the best and most beautiful productions of the international The Masked Singer editions. There was meant to be an audience of 300 people but because of COVID-19 measures, there was only an audience of 80 people possible. It took 1 hour to get the audience according to the measures and social restrictions safely into the studio. A home audience of 100 families was added.

=== Selection ===
Potential contestants for the first season were invited for a meeting. The format was explained and videos shown of international editions. Non-professional singers had to sing for 10 minutes for the singing coach of the series. Some contestants weren't withhold because of the limited capacity of their voice. After being selected the contestants received singing and dancing training.

In subsequent seasons, casting director Dimitri Smeulders considered the participants' empathy to be an important requirement. In addition, putting together the cast was a customised process; there was no such thing as the ideal candidate, but rather the ideal group composition. The well-known participants had to come from different fields and appeal to multiple generations. Once selected, candidates received singing lessons from vocal coach Ibernice MacBean. Here, they not only learned to sing in costume, but also to dare to sing in front of an audience of millions—a particular challenge for non-professional singers. In the Belgian edition, unlike other foreign editions, all singing was live. Professional singers faced other challenges; they often adjusted their voice to remain unrecognizable for as long as possible. Maksim Sotjanac sang some songs three tones lower in season 3, and season 4 winner Francisco Schuster darkened his voice. To ensure that a voice was not too recognizable, Fremantle played recordings to a select test audience of employees. Based on their judgment, some participants were eliminated. Belle Perez, for example, was not selected for the regular series, but was allowed to participate once in a The Masked Singer concert in 2024.

=== Costumes ===
After seeing the South-Korean format, the production knew that the costumes had to be high level to make the concept work in Flanders. Emmy Award-winning costume designer Marina Toybina created the costumes for the first three seasons. The process of creating a costume took three months. It started with the Belgian production pitching what characters they want. Toybina made concepts based on those wishes. The concepts were then used by the Belgian team to design the costume. The costumes are made by Alexandra Brandner in Germany and the masks by Marianne Meinl in Austria. At that time it is known who will wear the costumes, so the costumes can be fitted to the height and seize of the contestant.

Every candidate needed half or a full hour to get into the costume. Bathroom breaks were carefully planned. After only 10 minutes it became 35 degrees behind the masks. The costume of Queen was the heaviest with 12 kg. The costume of Dragonfly was the widest with 2,5 meters. The costumes of Diver and Monkey were modified during the season according to the songs they performed. The costume of Wolf had to be adjusted because the candidate got backproblems due to the weight of the tail. The helmet of Diver had so much condensation after three minutes, the contestant had to sing and perform blinded. Contestant Kathleen Aerts had to be overcome her claustrophobia to be able to wear the mask. During season two the temperature of the costume of Cyclops was measured 56 degrees. To remove the smell from the costumes, the dressmakers used vodka.

Contestants of the second season were again subjected to extreme conditions. The temperature inside the costume of Cyclops was measured 56 degrees Celsius one time and the head only of Red Deer weighed 10 kg. Contestants had a special designed armor to divide the heaviness of their costumes. The costume of Radish was made to have two arms outside but because of a weak shoulder of the contestant, the character had only one moving arm. The input from the Belgian production became bigger for the third season. Again, the costumes required a lot of work. More than 2.000 rhinestones were put into the costume of Wizard, taking 450 hours. Raven's costume needed 10.000 real feathers and took more than 500 hours to be complete. The suit of Cosmos required its own Wifi for the lightning hoops. The limited visibility due to the costumes became apparent when Foxy Lady almost fell off a stage.

For the fourth season, viewers could design one costume. Winner was 11-year-old Fiona with her costume Mister Withlove, based on the typical Belgian green chicory, called "witloof" in Dutch. As to the price of the costumes, the creators would only say that it is "thousands of euros" per costume. Investigative journalists calculated that a suit's budget went from 10,000 to 15,000 euros. But not every suit fell exactly into this price range. It was also disclosed that the characters and costumes were the first step, and a match was sought with a known contestant only afterward since the lead time for a costume was about a year. The executive producers of Fremantle and VTM had a list of ideas for characters each season. From there, a shortlist was made of about 14 characters. The selection was made on feasibility but also variety of both the types of characters but also their color. A selection was also made of cute characters for young viewers, spectacular characters for discerning viewers and all-round characters. The final measurement of the costumes was done a six to eight weeks before the costume was delivered. Participants had to be careful not to lose or gain too much weight. The fourth season featured a one-time masked singer for the first time. It was the first time in the Belgian series that this contestant was not given a new costume, but borrowed a costume from the first season of the German series, the costume of Eichhörnchen (Squirrel).

Due to the high quality of Belgian costumes, the Hippo costume of the third season was loaned for the sixth season of the French series, and even became the costume of the eventual winner. Both Hippo and Wolf of the first season appeared as Hippopo-Dame and Renardo, respectively, in the fifth season of the Canadian Chanteurs masqués. The Leeuw costume from the third season was also exchanged for the sixth Dutch season. Despite the fact that Flemish costumes are in demand abroad, VTM formally confirmed that all costumes in the Flemish regular season will be unique.

=== Security ===
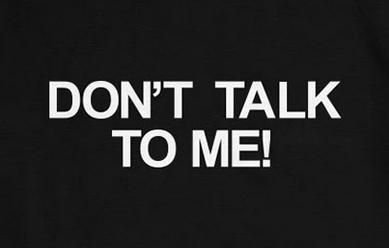
The front of the hoodies celebrities wear on set while offstage to prevent their voices from being heard.

The series had a codename during the production of the first season, "Meloenenjacht". The series is prerecorded so there are fewer people aware that the series is being recorded. The first two series were recorded during summer, at a time where the contestants had more free time at their schedules and it wouldn't be obvious to their relatives they would be away during the recording days.

The series had a codename during the production of the first season, "Meloenenjacht". Only 8 people knew the identity of the participants in advance: the executives of VTM, the singing and dancing coaches and directors of the series. The contestants also knew the identity of the other contestants. No other people were informed. Contestants had to get permission of the production team if they needed to inform their partner, family or children. VTM also asked the press not to leak any information about the identity of the participants if something was discovered.

During their arrival and exit at the recording studios the singers wear concealing black clothes, including the hoodie with the message "Don't talk to me" and masks. The contestants were brought with anonymous cars to the recording studios and had to put their personal belongings in a black bag. During rehearsals contestants had to use sign language or a chalk board to communicate with the crew because it was forbidden to use their real talking voice. For the second season the departure of the singers was strictly organised since people already knew the show and were more attentive.

Even the live studio audience didn't know the identity of the participants because the unmasking was taped after they had left the studio. The audience of the second season was selected by their participation of the first season, believing people who were curious for the first season would understand the importance of not telling others about the characters and costumes they witnessed. The cameras of the smartphones were also taped and checked when leaving the studios.

Everybody, the contestants, the crew, the judging panel and the audience, had to sign a non-disclosure agreement. There were 200.000 euros fine.

== Cast ==
=== Panelists and host ===
Following the announcement of the series in January 2020, Niels Destadsbader was confirmed as the host of the series. Julie Van den Steen was also announced. It was later revealed she would be part of the judging panel. By the end of January 2020 Jens Dendoncker and Karen Damen were announced as members of the panel.

In the second season Andy Peelman, Kevin Janssens and Ruth Beeckmans, who participated at the first season as masked singers, joined the panel of the first season. Of this group of 6 judges, some of them would be selected for each episode.

In every episode during the first season, there was a guest judge. These guest judges were Sean Dhondt, Leen Dendievel, Guga Baúl, Ingeborg, Laura Tesoro, Vincent Banić, and Lize Feryn. In the second season Bart Kaëll was a guest judge.

In the third season Jens Dendoncker left the panel and became the new host. Julie Van den Steen, Kevin Janssens and Andy Peelman returned as judges. Participants of the second season, Tine Embrechts and Bart Cannaerts were added to the judge panel.

== Series overview ==
Series overview
Season	Celebrities	Episodes	Originally released		Winner	Runner-up	Third place	Fourth place
Season	Celebrities	Episodes	First released	Last released	Winner	Runner-up	Third place	Fourth place
1	10	8	September 18, 2020	November 6, 2020	Sandra Kim as "Queen"	Giovanni Kemper as "Diver"	Kevin Janssens as "Wolf"	Nora Gharib as "Candyfloss"
2	13	10	January 14, 2022	March 18, 2022	Camille Dhont as "Miss Kitty"	Loredana as "Knight"	Conner Rousseau as "Rabbit"	Klaasje Meijer as "Scorpion"
3	14	12	February 3, 2023	April 28, 2023	Aaron Blommaert as "Wizard"	Miguel Wiels as "Mushroom"	Coely as "Raven"	Boris Van Severen as "Hippo"
4	16	12	September 20, 2024	December 6, 2024	Francisco Schuster as "Labradoodle"	Gustaph as "Phoenix"	Nathalie Meskens as "Doll"	Linda Mertens as "Medusa"
5	14	12	October 17, 2025	January 2, 2026	Jade Mintjens as "King Crab"	Mathias Mesmans as "Unicorn"	Maureen Vanherberghen as "Bambi"	LEEZ as "Violin"

== Reception ==
=== Ratings ===
Season	Time slot	No. of episodes	Premiered		Ended		TV season	Viewers (in millions)
Season	Time slot	No. of episodes	Date	Viewers (in millions)	Date	Viewers (in millions)	TV season	Viewers (in millions)
1	Fridays 8:40 pm	8	18 September 2020	1.00	6 November 2020	2.02	2020	1.44
2	Fridays 8:35 pm	10	14 January 2022	1.76	18 March 2022	1.77	2022	1.75
3	Fridays 8:35 pm	12	3 February 2023	1.84	28 April 2023	1.62	2023	1.58
4	Fridays 8:40 pm	12	20 September 2024	1.48	6 December 2024	1.31	2024	1.35
5	Fridays 8:40 pm	12	17 October 2025	1.40	2 January 2026		2025	

The series was very successful. The first episode was watched by more than one million viewers. The second episode got the highest rating for broadcaster VTM in five years. The 7th episode broke the record of highest rating for VTM since the rating started to be recorded in 1997. The episode had 1.7 million viewers. The final established a record with more than 2 million viewers, the highest rating for VTM in 20 years. The Masked Singer was the best-watched program of 2020 in Flanders. It was only the fourth time in the history of Flemish television that VTM took the top spot.

The first episode of the second season was watched by almost 1,4 million viewers. With delayed viewers, there were 1,8 million viewers. Channel manager Janssen and creative director Parmentier called it an unseen start. The second season's finale had 1,209,541 live viewers, making it the best-watched program in 2022.

The third season started with almost 2 million viewers, making it the best rates for the show since its debut. So after three seasons, the formula still hadn't worked out. Again, the program was the best-watched program in 2023 with 1,617,795 viewers during the finale.

The opening of the fourth season scored strongly but significantly lower than the previous season. There were less than a million live viewers for the first time for the first episode. Due to the rerun and rewatching, this rose to 1.45 million viewers.

The fifth season was the most watched program of the week for several weeks. The season lost an average of 100,000 viewers compared to the previous season but capitalized on its status by becoming the second most popular program of 2025.

=== Critical response ===
The series had very high ratings during the first season. Executive producers pointed three reasons for its popularity: it's one of the little programs that can be watched by the whole family together, the excitement and curiosity about who's behind the masks and the visual attractive show with eyecatching costumes, popular music and beautiful staging. The interaction with the social media improved the popularity. The first season was also broadcoasted at the time of a second lockdown during the COVID-19 pandemic in Belgium. Because of the lockdown many people were at home.

The second season in 2022 however confirmed the popularity of the program. Critics were sceptic about the program, saying the purpose of the show is unclear. They referred to the character Red Deer, one of the best singers, who was almost voted out during the first episode, saying this made clear it isn't a competition about being the best singer. On the other hand, if the purpose would be who's the best in keeping his true identity secret, top tennis player Yanina Wickmayer shouldn't had to unmask herself during the first episode because neither the panel neither the audience guessed her identity. Other critics believed the show is simple but very clever entertainment. There are no limits about the guesses which makes everyone guessing, and returning to see if the guesses are correct. At the start of the fifth season, critics questioned the usefulness of the jury. They often gave incorrect names, led viewers astray, and frequently interrupted the performances of the Masked Singers with their reactions. According to critics, the jury was the weakest point of an otherwise well-executed programme.

Some critics commented about the call of panel member Julie Van den Steen during the second season to like a photo of unmasked participants Robots, saying if they'd get 50.000 likes they would return for the final. Commenters pointed out their return was fixed and the voting was pointless, since the season was recorded months before the broadcast. The unmasking of party chairman Conner Rousseau also sparked the question if an important politician should participate at an entertainment show.

=== Awards and nominations ===
Awards and nominations
Award	Year (Note: Indicates the year of ceremony)	Category	Nominee(s)	Result	Ref.
Het gala van de gouden K's	2021	Family program of the year 2020	The Masked Singer	Won	
Het gala van de gouden K's	2023	Family program of the year 2022	The Masked Singer	Won	
Het gala van de gouden K's	2024	Family program of the year 2023	The Masked Singer	Won	
Het gala van de gouden K's	2024	Hero of the year 2023	Aaron Blommaert in The Masked Singer	Won	
Het gala van de gouden K's	2025	Family program of the year 2024	The Masked Singer	Won	
Kastaars!	2023	Television show of 2022	The Masked Singer	Nominated	
Kastaars!	2023	Participant of 2022	Camille Dhont as Miss Kitty in The Masked Singer	Nominated	
Kastaars!	2023	Media moment of the year	The unmasking of Conner Rousseau as Rabbit in The Masked Singer	Nominated	
Kastaars!	2024	Breakthrough of 2023	Aaron Blommaert, winner of The Masked Singer	Won	
Kastaars!	2024	Television show of 2024	The Masked Singer	Nominated	
Kastaars!	2025	Television show of 2025	The Masked Singer	Nominated	
Kastaars!	2025	Breakthrough of 2025	Jade Mintjens, winner of The Masked Singer	Nominated	
Promax Awards	2022	Best In-House Program Promo	The Masked Singer	Won	

== Specials ==
During the final week of the first season, two specials aired. On 4 November De Geheimen achter The Masked Singer aired on VTM. It was a compilation of the stories of the unmasked celebrities from the spin-off The Masked Singer: Behind the Mask. It had 616.168 viewers. On 7 November the special The Masked Singer: The Day After aired. This was a special about the finalists and winner. This special had 919.230 viewers.

== Spin-off ==
In the online spin-off The Masked Singer: Behind the Mask, the unmasked celebrities shared their story. Each episode included some behind the scenes footage on how they prepared for their live performances. They all agreed on one thing: it was extremely difficult to perform as a masked singer because it was very hot inside the mask, visibility was limited, and they had difficulty breathing. The episodes were available exclusively on VTM's video streaming platform VTM GO.

Since the second season The Masked Singer: Behind the Mask was also broadcast by VTM. The first episode had 439.644 viewers.

For its fifth season, Behind the Mask got a presenter, season 3 winner and investigator in subsequent seasons, Aaron Blommaert.

== The Masked Singer in Concert ==
Following the success of the first two seasons and the launch of the third season, a live concert in Sportpaleis in Antwerp with participants of all three seasons was announced for 2023. The winners of the first two seasons joined the line-up. The concert aired on VTM on May 14, 2023. The fourth season was also accompanied by live concerts in 2024, which again included the three winners of the first three seasons. Also appearing for the first time was a masked guest singer, Mysterium, who was unmasked during the concert. Even before the start of the fifth season, a special Christmas concert was announced. During this concert, the character Big Jens was unmasked live.

Venue	Date	Masked singers	Guest singer
Antwerpen, Sportpaleis	15 April 2023	16	-
Antwerpen, Sportpaleis	16 November 2024, Matinee	14	Mysterium (Belle Perez)
Antwerpen, Sportpaleis	16 November 2024, Evening	14	Mysterium (2 Fabiola)
Antwerpen, AFAS Dome	20 December 2025, Evening	14	Big Jens (Koen Wauters)

== Other media ==
Hoodies using the show's branding were purchasable on the aligned newspaper online store since the first season. Four costumes of the second season were available as onesies for children during the second season. Following the third season, a capsule collection was available.

The winner of the first season, Sandra Kim, immediately released a single after her victory. It was a cover version of the show's theme song Who Are You, produced by Regi.

There was a special event for the second season final. In Kinepolis Antwerpen the final was shown in one of the theatres. The public could meet the contestants and see en be photographed with the costumes of that season.

For the third season collector cards were made. The collectible cards returned for the fourth season and also formed a game.

For the fourth season, stickers of the characters could also be collected in stores.

== See also ==
- The Masked Singer franchise
