= The Masked Singer (Belgian TV series) season 3 =

The Masked Singer
- Season 3
- Starring: Julie Van den Steen; Andy Peelman; Bart Cannaerts; Kevin Janssens; Tine Embrechts
- Hosted by: Jens Dendoncker
- Winner: Aaron Blommaert as "Wizard"
- Runner-up: Miguel Wiels as "Mushroom"
- No. of episodes: 12

Release
- Original network: VTM
- Original release: 3 February – 28 April 2023

Season chronology
- ← Previous; Season 2 Next → Season 4

The third season of The Masked Singer based on the Masked Singer franchise which originated from the South Korean version of the show King of Mask Singer. It premiered on VTM on 3 February 2023 and is hosted by Jens Dendoncker.

The season started with the best ratings since its debut, with almost 2 million viewers. Big surprise came when the prima ballerina Hippo had a male singing voice. The singer made it to the finale, and turned out to be actor Boris Van Severen. For the first time, no professional singer won, but actor and presenter Aaron Blommaert who did have singing experience. Blommaert did launch a singing career through his victory.

The program was the best-watched program in 2023 in Flanders, repeating the success of the previous seasons.

== Production ==
After the success of the first two seasons, even named the biggest success of broadcoaster VTM ever, a third season was ordered. It was announced that Jens Dendoncker, who was a judge in the previous seasons, would be the new host. A first trailer of the season was released 6 January 2023. It was filmed in a castle.

There were some changes. There were fourteen contestants this season, more than the previous seasons. For the first time the contestants were split into two groups of seven. Only the last remaining four contestants of each group, would join the final group of eight contestants towards the final.

Before the first episode, the audience could already hear the voices of the contestants since audio fragments were released.

== Cast ==
=== Panelists ===
Panel members Julie Van den Steen, Andy Peelman and Kevin Janssens returned. Bart Cannaerts and Tine Embrechts, who participated at the previous season as masked singers, joined the panel. Of this group of 5 judges, a few of them would be selected for each episode.

Color key
Featured in this episode as a judge.

The Masked Singer Judges
Judge	Episodes											
Judge	1	2	3	4	5	6	7	8	9	10	11	12
Andy Peelman												
Bart Cannaerts												
Julie Van den Steen												
Kevin Janssens												
Tine Embrechts												
Karen Damen												
Guest Judge		Astrid Coppens	Kürt Rogiers	Maaike Cafmeyer	Nina Derwael	Margriet Hermans		Kamal Khamarch	Jelle De Beule		Belle Perez	

== Contestants ==
The first eight contestants were introduced on 13 January.

The other six characters were revealed in many ways. A new character, Cosmos, appeared on a mural in Antwerp on 17 January 2023. Three new characters performed at an exclusive party on 21 January. On 25 January a new character, Mummy, was heard on several radio stations. The last contestant, Butterfly, was revealed in Leuven on 1 February and on 2 February online.

The season started in two groups. The remaining singers were brought together for the first time in the seventh episode, the long-announced Big Bang.

Stage name	Celebrity	Occupation	Episodes											
Stage name	Celebrity	Occupation	1	2	3	4	5	6	7	8	9	10	11	12
Tovenaar ("Wizard")	Aaron Blommaert	Actor		RISK		WIN		WIN	WIN	RISK	WIN	RISK	SAFE	WINNER
Champignon ("Mushroom")	Miguel Wiels	Composer	WIN		WIN		WIN		WIN	RISK	WIN	SAFE	SAFE	RUNNER-UP
Raaf ("Raven")	Coely	Singer	WIN		RISK		SAFE		RISK	WIN	RISK	SAFE	SAFE	THIRD
Hippo	Boris Van Severen	Actor		WIN		WIN		SAFE	RISK	WIN	WIN	SAFE	OUT	
Foxy Lady	Danira Boukhriss	TV Presenter		WIN		RISK		SAFE	WIN	RISK	RISK	OUT		
Leeuw ("Lion")	Maksim Stojanac	Singer	WIN		WIN		RISK		RISK	WIN	OUT			
Minotaurus ("Minotaur")	Jan Van Looveren	Actor		WIN		WIN		RISK	WIN	OUT				
Mummie ("Mummy")	Véronique De Kock	TV Presenter	RISK		RISK		SAFE		OUT					
Kosmos ("Cosmos")	Siska Schoeters	Radio Host		RISK		RISK		OUT						
Soaperstar	Kat Kerkhofs	Program Maker	RISK		WIN		OUT							
Vlinder ("Butterfly")	MATTN	DJ		RISK		OUT								
Groot Licht ("Big Light")	Timmy Simons	Footballer	RISK		OUT									
Kolonel Mops ("Colonel Pug")	Marc Coucke	Businessman		OUT										
Skiwi	Herman Verbruggen	Actor	OUT											

The masked singer was safe from elimination.
The masked singer won their face-off, and remained in the competition.
The masked singer lost their face-off, but was not eliminated.
The masked singer was eliminated from the competition, and was unmasked upon their elimination.
The masked singer did not perform.
The masked singer won the competition.
The masked singer finished second.
The masked singer finished third.
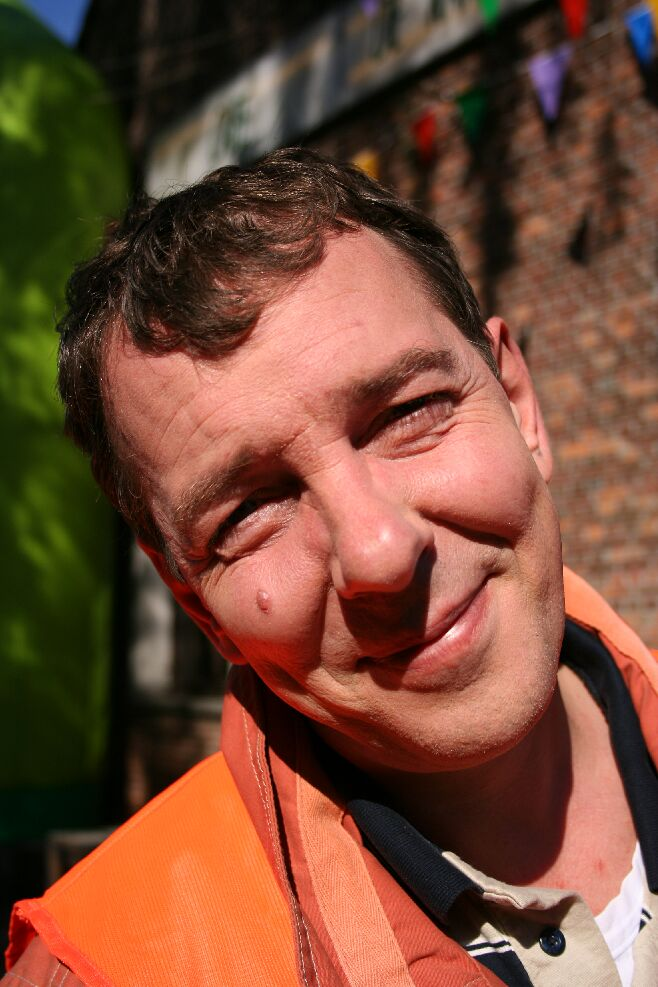
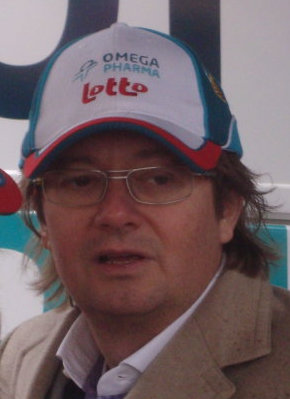
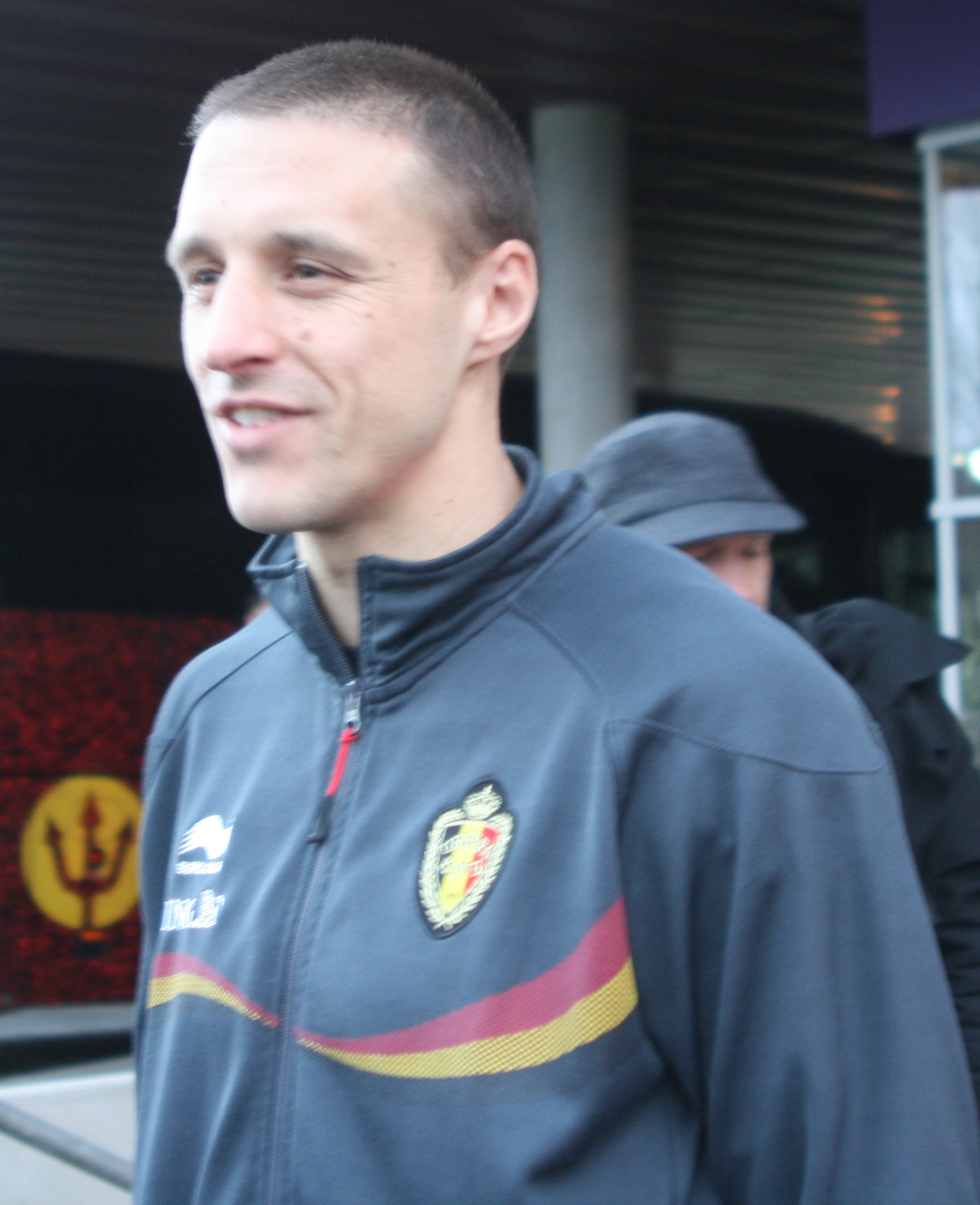
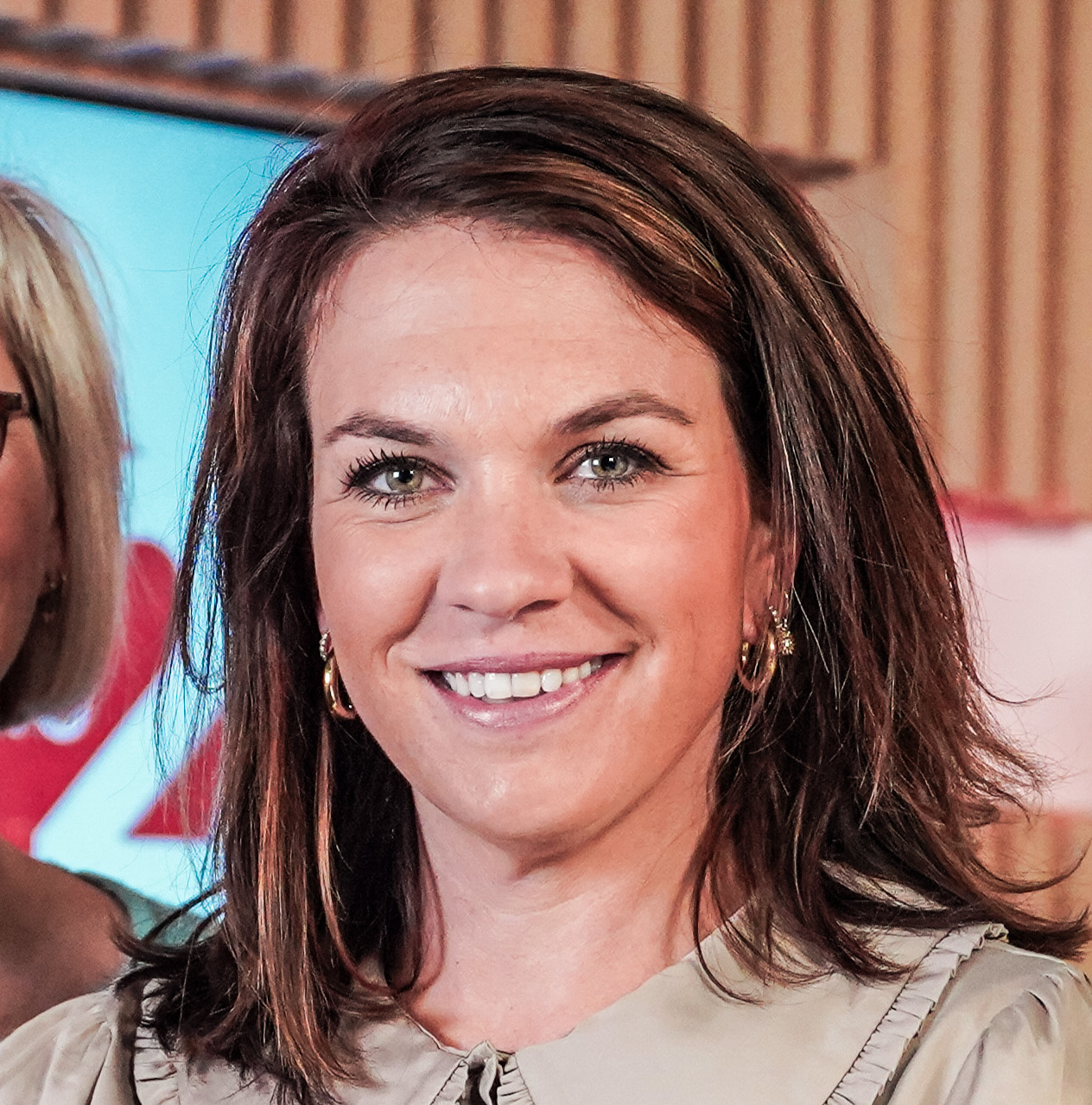
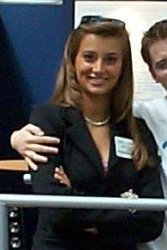
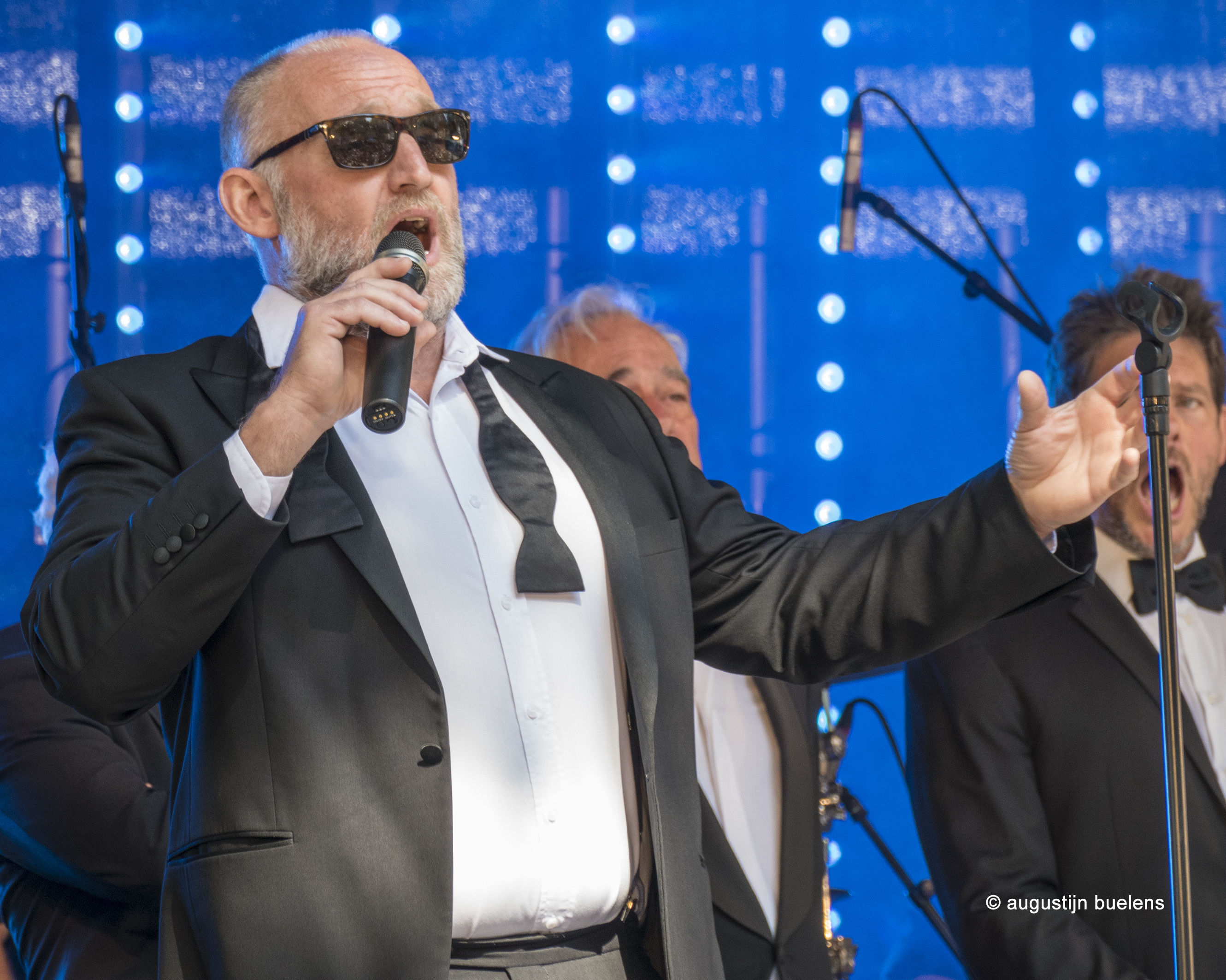
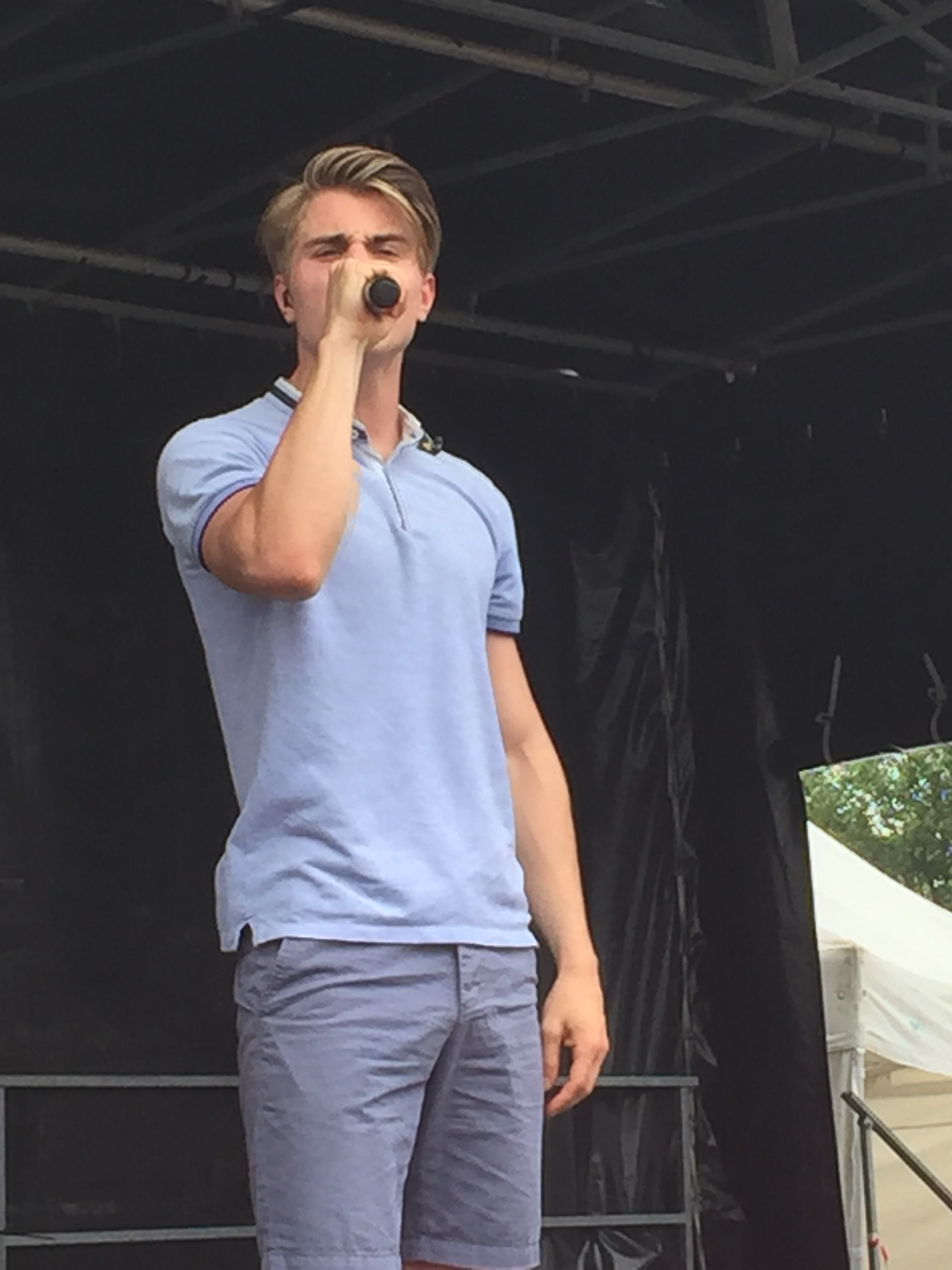
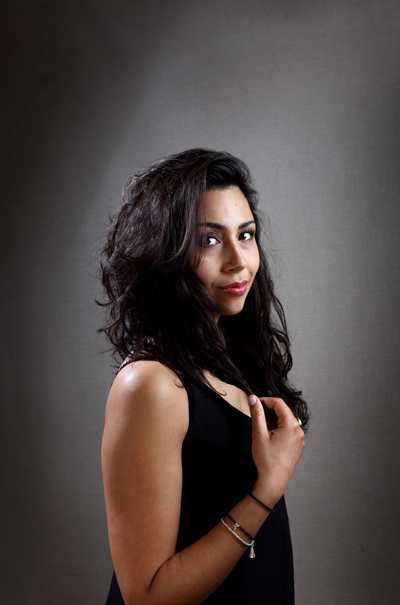
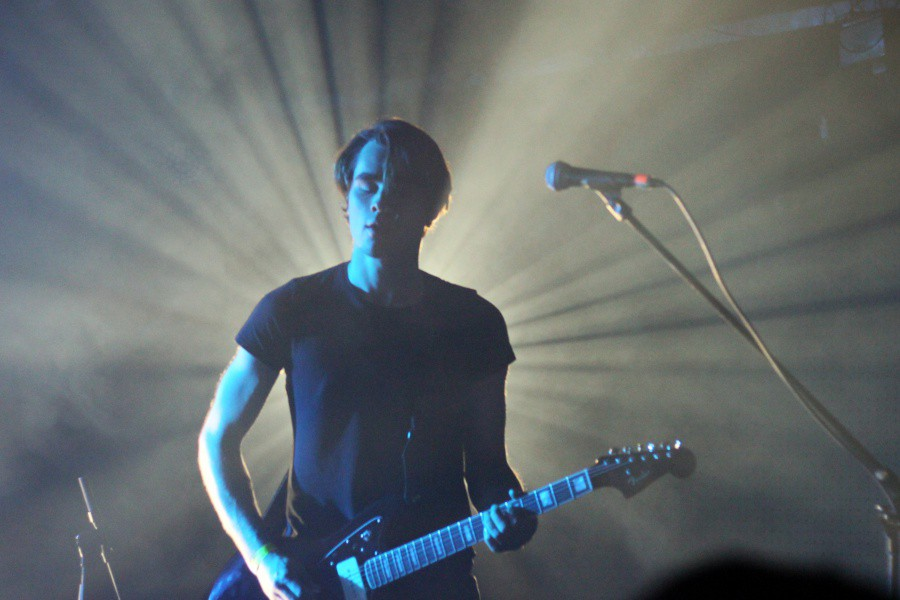
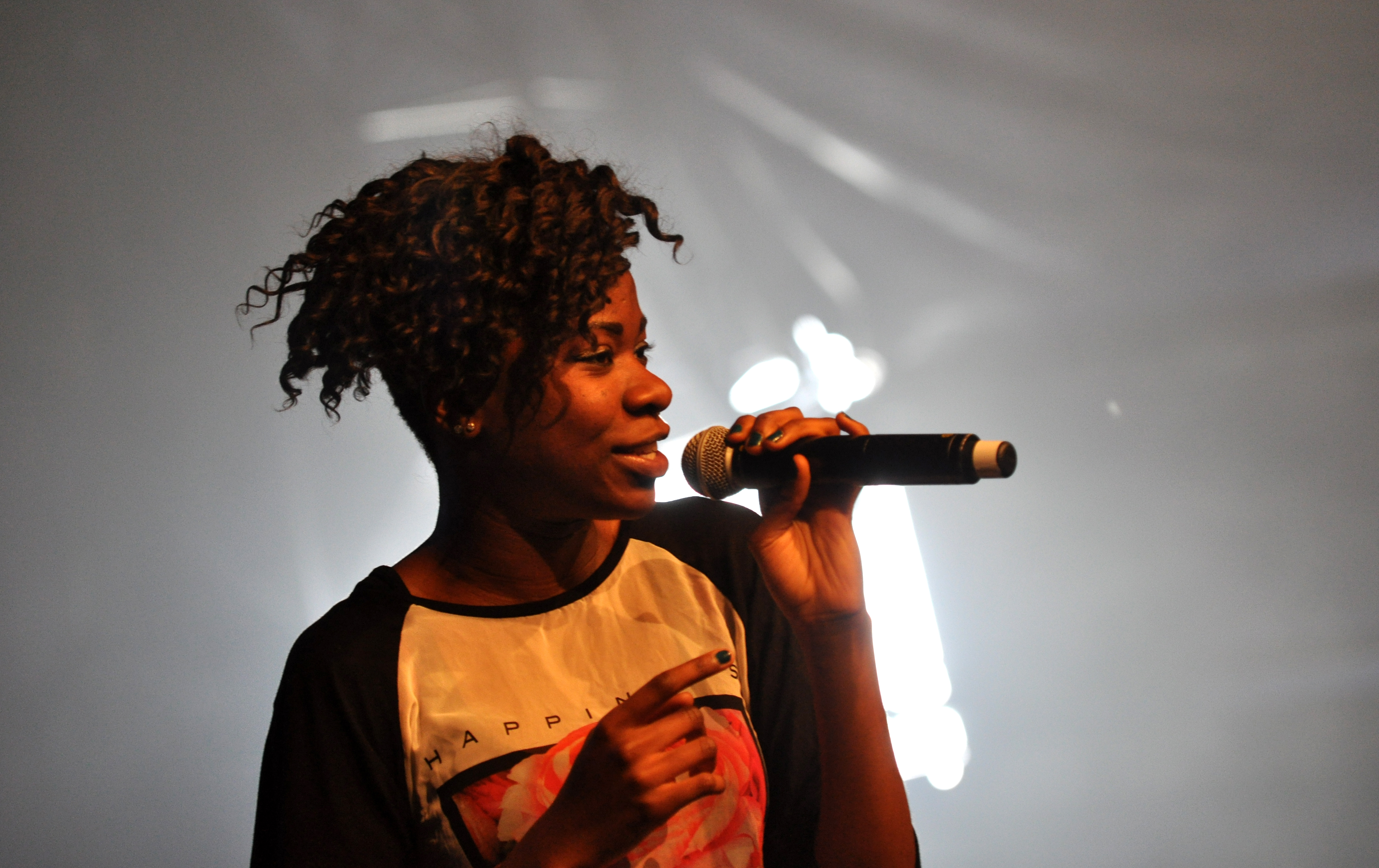
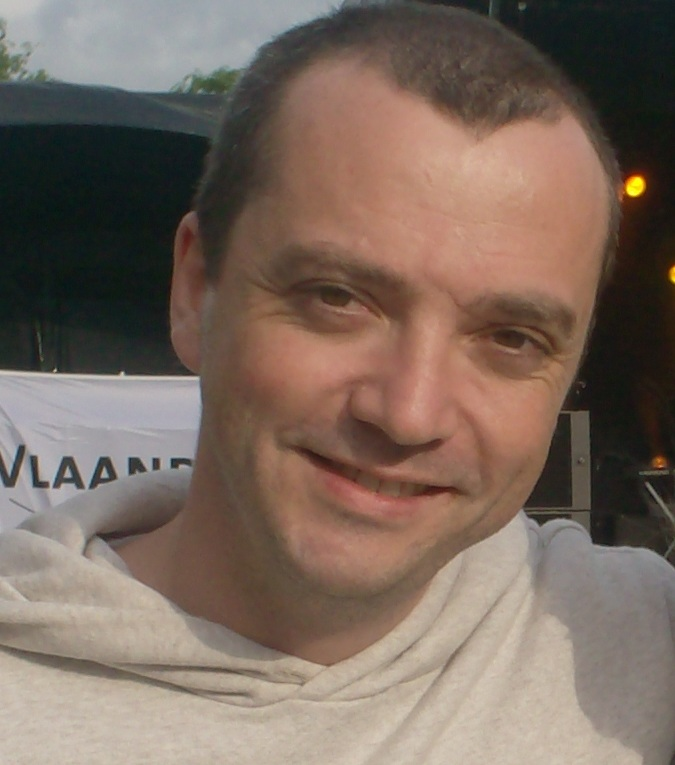
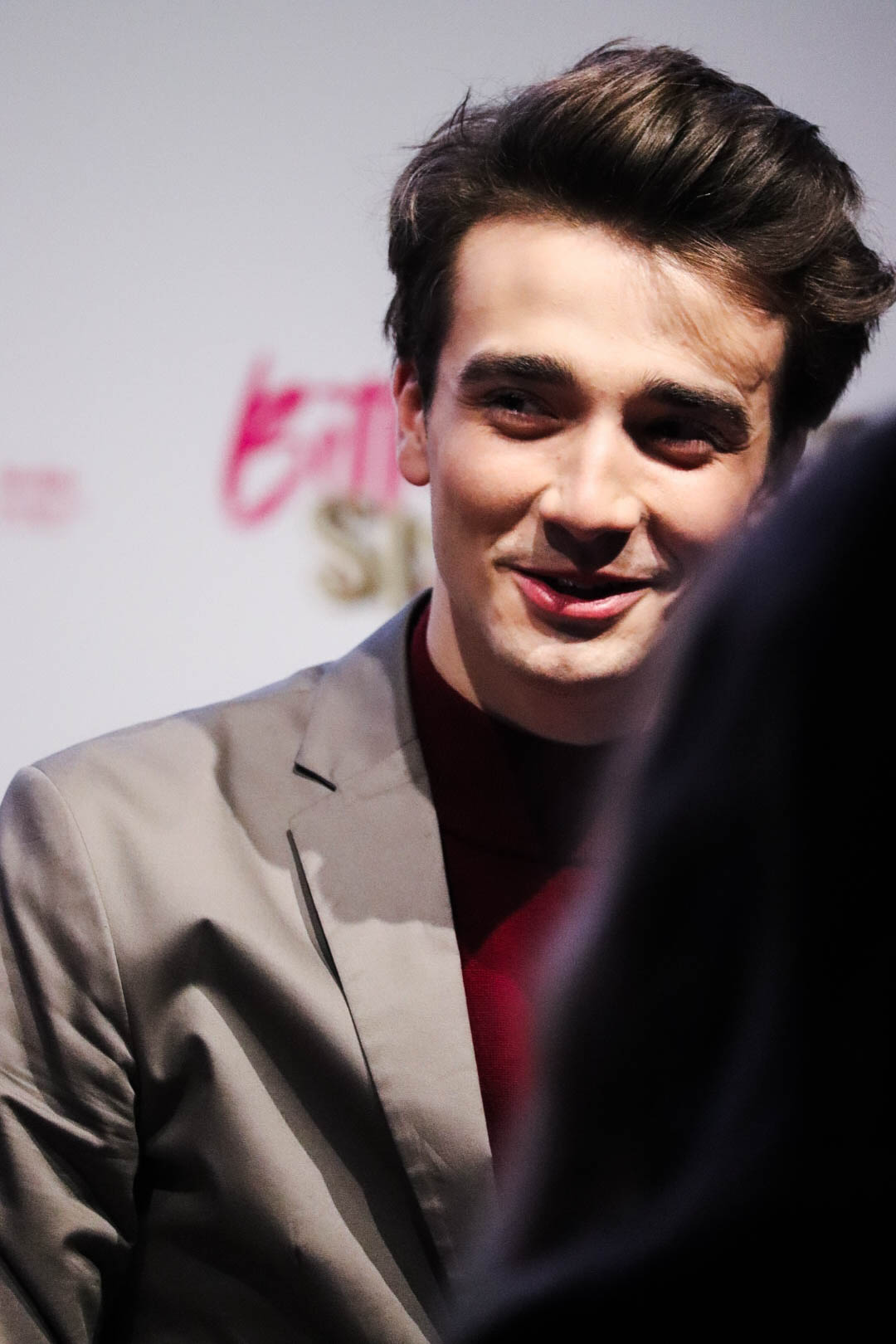
The celebrities who competed in the third season of The Masked Singer, pictured in order of elimination (L–R):

Herman Verbruggen ("Skiwi"), Mark Coucke ("Kolonel Mops"), Timmy Simons ("Groot Licht"), Siska Schoeters ("Kosmos"), Véronique de Kock ("Mummie"), Jan Van Looveren ("Minotaurus"), Maksim Stojanac ("Leeuw"), Danira Boukhriss ("Foxy Lady"), Boris Van Severen ("Hippo"), Coely ("Raaf"), Miguel Wiels ("Champignon"), and Aaron Blommaert ("Tovenaar")

Not pictured: MATTN ("Vlinder") and Kat Kerkhofs ("Soaperstar")

== Episodes ==
=== Episode 1 (3 February) ===
- Group number: "Uptown Funk" by Bruno Mars

Performances on the first episode
#	Stage name	Song	Identity	Result
1	Mushroom	"Iko Iko" by Justin Wellington	undisclosed	WIN
2	Mummy	"Bad Romance" by Lady Gaga	undisclosed	RISK
3	Lion	"I Was Made for Lovin' You" by Kiss	undisclosed	WIN
4	Big Light	"Dancing On My Own" by Robyn	undisclosed	RISK
5	Soaperstar	"Into You" by Ariana Grande	undisclosed	RISK
6	Skiwi	"Le Freak" by Chic	Herman Verbruggen	OUT
7	Raven	"Skyfall" by Adele	undisclosed	WIN

=== Episode 2 (10 February) ===
- Group number: "Take On Me" by A-ha

Performances on the second episode
#	Stage name	Song	Identity	Result
1	Hippo	"About Damn Time" by Lizzo	undisclosed	WIN
2	Cosmos	"Ain't Nobody" by Chaka Khan	undisclosed	RISK
3	Colonel Pug	"Sweet Caroline" by DJ Otzi	Marc Coucke	OUT
4	Butterfly	"How Long Will I Love You" by Ellie Goulding	undisclosed	RISK
5	Minotaur	"The Show Must Go On" by Queen	undisclosed	WIN
6	Foxy Lady	"Don't Let Go (Love)" by En Vogue	undisclosed	WIN
7	Wizard	"Space Man" by Sam Ryder	undisclosed	RISK

=== Episode 3 (17 February) ===
Performances on the third episode
#	Stage name	Song	Identity	Result
1	Lion	"Late Night Talking" by Harry Styles	undisclosed	WIN
2	Mummy	"Break My Heart" by Dua Lipa	undisclosed	RISK
3	Raven	"In the Dark" by Purple Disco Machine & Sophie and the Giants	undisclosed	RISK
4	Mushroom	"I Want to Know What Love Is" by Foreigner	undisclosed	WIN
5	Big Light	"Green Green Grass" by George Ezra	Timmy Simons	OUT
6	Soaperstar	"Not an Addict" by K's Choice ft. Skin	undisclosed	WIN

=== Episode 4 (24 February) ===
Performances on the fourth episode
#	Stage name	Song	Identity	Result
1	Foxy Lady	"Maybe You're the Problem" by Ava Max	undisclosed	RISK
2	Minotaur	"All I Want" by Kodaline	undisclosed	WIN
3	Wizard	"Grace Kelly" by MIKA	undisclosed	WIN
4	Cosmos	"Snap" by Rosa Linn	undisclosed	RISK
5	Butterfly	"Crazy What Love Can Do" by Becky Hill, David Guetta & Ella Henderson	MATTN	OUT
6	Hippo	"Tainted Love" by Marilyn Manson	undisclosed	WIN

=== Episode 5 (3 March) ===
Performances on the fifth episode
#	Stage name	Song	Identity	Result
1	Mushroom	"Livin' la Vida Loca" by Ricky Martin	undisclosed	WIN
2	Lion	"Take Me to Church" by Hozier	undisclosed	RISK
3	Mummy	"I Love Rock 'n' Roll" by Britney Spears	undisclosed	SAFE
4	Soaperstar	"Happier Than Ever" by Billie Eilish	Kat Kerkhofs	OUT
5	Raven	"Queen of the Night" by Whitney Houston	undisclosed	SAFE
1	Mummy & Soaperstar	"I Need Never Get Old" by Nathaniel Rateliff		
2	Lion & Raven	"Raise Your Glass" by P!nk		

=== Episode 6 (10 March) ===
Performances on the sixth episode
#	Stage name	Song	Identity	Result
1	Foxy Lady	"Don't Go Yet" by Camila Cabello	undisclosed	SAFE
2	Hippo	"Another Love" by Tom Odell	undisclosed	SAFE
3	Cosmos	"Chained to the Rhythm" by Katy Perry	Siska Schoeters	OUT
4	Wizard	"Careless Whisper" by George Michael	undisclosed	WIN
5	Minotaur	"Smells Like Teen Spirit" by Nirvana	undisclosed	RISK
1	Foxy Lady & Cosmos	"All These Nights" by Tom Grennan		
2	Hippo & Minotaur	"Don't Stop Believin'" by Journey		

=== Episode 7 (17 March) ===
Performances on the seventh episode
#	Stage name	Song	Identity	Result
1	Wizard	"Locked Out of Heaven" by Bruno Mars	undisclosed	WIN
2	Mummy	"Walk Like an Egyptian" by The Bangles	Véronique De Kock	OUT
3	Lion	"Let Me Entertain You" by Robbie Williams	undisclosed	RISK
4	Foxy Lady	"Because Of You" by Kelly Clarkson	undisclosed	WIN
5	Mushroom	"I'm Still Standing" by Elton John	undisclosed	WIN
6	Hippo	"Heavy Cross" by Gossip	undisclosed	RISK
7	Minotaur	"You Raise Me Up" by Josh Groban	undisclosed	WIN
8	Raven	"We Found Love" by Rihanna ft. Calvin Harris	undisclosed	RISK

=== Episode 8 (31 March) ===
Performances on the eighth episode
#	Stage name	Song	Identity	Result
1	Minotaur	"Dance All Over Me" by George Ezra	Jan Van Looveren	OUT
2	Hippo	"The Loneliest" by Måneskin	undisclosed	WIN
3	Foxy Lady	"Unholy" by Sam Smith ft. Kim Petras	undisclosed	RISK
4	Raven	"Hold My Hand" by Lady Gaga	undisclosed	WIN
5	Wizard	"Gimme! Gimme! Gimme! (A Man After Midnight)" by ABBA	undisclosed	RISK
6	Lion	"Man in the Mirror" by Michael Jackson	undisclosed	WIN
7	Mushroom	"Like A Virgin" by Madonna	undisclosed	RISK

=== Episode 9 (7 April) ===
Performances on the ninth episode
#	Stage name	Song	Identity	Result
1	Raven	"Never Gonna Not Dance Again" by P!nk	undisclosed	RISK
2	Mushroom	"Nothing's Gonna Change My Love For You" by Glenn Medeiros	undisclosed	WIN
3	Hippo	"Let's Go Crazy" by Prince	undisclosed	WIN
4	Foxy Lady	"Can't Help Falling in Love" by Elvis Presley	undisclosed	RISK
5	Lion	"Lionheart (Fearless)" by Joel Corry & Tom Grennan	undisclosed	RISK
6	Wizard	"Miss You" by Jérémie Makiese	undisclosed	WIN
Sing-off details
1	Raven	"Larger Than Life" by Backstreet Boys	undisclosed	SAFE
2	Foxy Lady	"Larger Than Life" by Backstreet Boys	undisclosed	SAFE
3	Lion	"Larger Than Life" by Backstreet Boys	Maksim Stojanac	OUT

=== Episode 10 (14 April) ===
- Group number (with Queen and Wolf from Season 1 and Miss Kitty, Knight, and Rabbit from Season 2): "Firework" by Katy Perry

Performances on the tenth episode
#	Stage name	Song	Duet partner	Identity	Result
1	Hippo	"2 Be Loved (Am I Ready)" by Lizzo	Camille Dhont (Miss Kitty)	undisclosed	SAFE
2	Wizard	"One" by U2	Loredana (Knight)	undisclosed	RISK
3	Mushroom	"Get Down (You're the One for Me)" by Backstreet Boys	Conner Rousseau (Rabbit)	undisclosed	SAFE
4	Foxy Lady	"You're the One That I Want" by John Travolta & Olivia Newton-John	Kevin Janssens (Wolf)	undisclosed	RISK
5	Raven	"Try" by P!nk	Sandra Kim (Queen)	undisclosed	SAFE
Sing-off details
1	Wizard	"Relight My Fire" by Take That ft. Lulu	N/A	undisclosed	SAFE
2	Foxy Lady	"Relight My Fire" by Take That ft. Lulu	N/A	Danira Boukhriss	OUT

=== Episode 11 (21 April) ===
Each contestant performed two songs. Two contestants were saved from elimination by the judges, one contestant was saved by the audience. The remaining contestant was unmasked.

Performances on the eleventh episode
#	Stage name	Song	Identity	Result
1	Mushroom	"You Give Love a Bad Name" by Bon Jovi	undisclosed	SAFE
1	Mushroom	"We Are the Champions" by Queen	undisclosed	SAFE
2	Hippo	"Sorry Seems to Be the Hardest Word" by Elton John	Boris Van Severen	OUT
2	Hippo	"Love On Top" by Beyoncé	Boris Van Severen	OUT
3	Raven	"Strong" by London Grammar	undisclosed	SAFE
3	Raven	"Hurts" by Emeli Sandé	undisclosed	SAFE
4	Wizard	"Noodgeval" by Goldband	undisclosed	SAFE
4	Wizard	"It's All Coming Back to Me Now" by Celine Dion	undisclosed	SAFE

=== Episode 12 (28 April) - Finale ===
- Group number: "Spectrum (Say My Name)" by Florence + The Machine

After each contestant performed two songs, two of them were saved by the audience and the third one was unmasked. The remaining two contestants went up against each other in a sing-off. The audience chose the winner, after which both the runner-up and the winner were unmasked.

Performances on the twelfth episode
#	Stage name	Song	Identity	Result
1	Raven	"Chandelier" by Sia	Coely	THIRD
1	Raven	"Queen of the Night" by Whitney Houston	Coely	THIRD
2	Mushroom	"I'm Into Folk" by The Radios	undisclosed	SAFE
2	Mushroom	"I Want to Know What Love Is" by Foreigner	undisclosed	SAFE
3	Wizard	"Never Enough" by Loren Allred	undisclosed	SAFE
3	Wizard	"Gimme! Gimme! Gimme! (A Man After Midnight)" by ABBA	undisclosed	SAFE
Sing-off details
1	Mushroom	"Dream On" by Aerosmith	Miguel Wiels	RUNNER-UP
2	Wizard	"Dream On" by Aerosmith	Aaron Blommaert	WINNER
