= The Masked Singer (Belgian TV series) season 5 =

The Masked Singer
- Season 5
- Starring: Aaron Blommaert; Céline Van Ouytsel; Frances Lefebure; Francisco Schuster; James Cooke; Tine Embrechts; Véronique De Kock; Ward Lemmelijn
- Hosted by: Jens Dendoncker
- Winner: Jade Mintjens as "King Crab"
- Runner-up: Mathias Mesmans as "Unicorn"
- No. of episodes: 12

Release
- Original network: VTM
- Original release: 17 October 2025 – 2 January 2026

Season chronology
- ← Previous; Season 4

The fifth season of The Masked Singer based on the Masked Singer franchise which originated from the South Korean version of the show King of Mask Singer. It premiered on VTM on 17 October 2025 and is hosted again by Jens Dendoncker.

On the occasion of the fifth and therefore anniversary season, the presenter was given a masked co-presenter like himself, Grote Jens (Big Jens). This character was unmasked live during The Masked Singer's Christmas concert just before the semi-finals.

The promotional video for Flitser caused a stir among traffic experts, because they believed it promoted apps that alert drivers to speed cameras. For the first time in the Belgian edition, a trio took part when, in episode two, Pluisje became the trio Pluisjes.

Comedienne Jade Mintjens won the season. She was the first non-professional singer to win the Flemish edition.

The season premiere was just shy of being the most-watched television moment of 2025. The broadcasts were the most-watched program of the week for several weeks.

== Cast ==
=== Panelists ===
Panel members Aaron Blommaert, Frances Lefebure, Tine Embrechts and Véronique De Kock returned.

New investigators were assembled, consisting of the winner of the previous season, Francisco Schuster, two participants from the previous season, James Cooke and Céline Van Ouytsel, and fan of the program and top athlete Ward Lemmelijn.

Color key
Featured in this episode as a judge.

The Masked Singer Judges
Judge	Episodes											
Judge	1	2	3	4	5	6	7	8	9	10	11	12
Aaron Blommaert												
Céline Van Ouytsel												
Elisabeth Lucie Baeten												
Frances Lefebure												
Francisco Schuster												
James Cooke												
Ruth Beeckmans												
Tine Embrechts												
Véronique De Kock												
Ward Lemmelijn												

The Masked Singer Guest judges
Episode	Guest judge
1	
2	
3	Julia, Marthe & Hanne from K3
4	Steven Van Herreweghe
5	Anastasya Chernook
6	Average Rob
7	Ruben Van Gucht
8	Eva De Roo
9	Nora Monsecour
10	Aster Nzeyimana
11	Camille Dhont
12	

== Contestants ==
One month before the start of the program, the first costume was revealed. This time, it was not for a masked singer, but for a masked co-host who was disguised as Grote Jens (Big Jens), the host Jens Dendoncker. A week before the program, Grote Jens teased the first seven masked singers: King Krab, Oehoe, Bambi, Pauw, Flitser, Château, and Pluisje.

Stage name	Celebrity	Occupation	Episodes											
Stage name	Celebrity	Occupation	1	2	3	4	5	6	7	8	9	10	11	12
King Krab ("King Crab")	Jade Mintjens	Comedian and Actress	WIN	RISK	RISK				RISK	WIN	RISK	RISK	SAFE	WINNER
Eenhoorn ("Unicorn")	Mathias Mesmans	Singer and Actor				WIN	WIN	SAFE	WIN	WIN	WIN	WIN	SAFE	RUNNER-UP
Bambi	Maureen Vanherberghen	Singer	WIN	WIN	WIN				WIN	WIN	WIN	WIN	SAFE	THIRD
Viool ("Violin")	LEEZ	Singer				WIN	WIN	WIN	WIN	RISK	WIN	RISK	OUT	
Chinchilla	Dorothee Dauwe	Radio Presenter				WIN	WIN	RISK	RISK	WIN	RISK	OUT		
Schaapje ("Little Sheep")	Ingeborg	Singer				WIN	RISK	SAFE	WIN	RISK	OUT			
Pluisjes ("Fluffs")	De Romeo's	Music Group	RISK	WIN	SAFE				RISK	OUT				
Pauw ("Peacock")	Pauline Slangen	Singer	WIN	RISK	WIN				OUT					
Fortuna ("Fortune")	Lynn Van den Broeck	Actress				RISK	RISK	OUT						
Broccoli	Philippe Geubels	Comedian				RISK	OUT							
Cupido ("Cupid")	Ender Scholtens	Blogger				OUT								
Oehoe ("Eagle Owl")	Toby Alderweireld	Footballer	RISK	WIN	OUT									
Château ("Castle")	Jacotte Brokken	Weather Presenter	WIN	OUT										
Flitser ("Flash")	Viktor Verhulst	TV Presenter	OUT											

The masked singer was safe from elimination.
The masked singer won their face-off, and remained in the competition.
The masked singer lost their face-off, but was not eliminated.
The masked singer was eliminated from the competition, and was unmasked upon their elimination.
The masked singer did not perform.
The masked singer won the competition.
The masked singer finished second.
The masked singer finished third.

== Episodes ==
=== Episode 1 (17 October) ===
Performances on the first episode
#	Stage name	Song	Identity	Result
1	Bambi	"Austin (Boots Stop Workin')" by Dasha	undisclosed	WIN
2	Eagle Owl	"Iris" by Goo Goo Dolls	undisclosed	RISK
3	King Crab	"That Don't Impress Me Much" by Shania Twain	undisclosed	WIN
4	Castle	"Messy" by Lola Young	undisclosed	WIN
5	Flash	"Sex Bomb" by Tom Jones & Mousse T.	Viktor Verhulst	OUT
6	Peacock	"Habanera" from Carmen	undisclosed	WIN
7	Fluff	"Money, Money, Money" by ABBA	undisclosed	RISK

=== Episode 2 (24 October) ===
Performances on the second episode
#	Stage name	Song	Identity	Result
1	Peacock	"Espresso" by Sabrina Carpenter	undisclosed	RISK
2	Eagle Owl	"Mr. Brightside" by The Killers	undisclosed	WIN
3	Fluffs	"Caruso" by Lucio Dalla	undisclosed	WIN
4	Castle	"Mercy" by Duffy	Jacotte Brokken	OUT
5	Bambi	"When the Party's Over" by Billie Eilish	undisclosed	WIN
6	King Crab	"Why Tell Me, Why" by Anita Meyer	undisclosed	RISK

=== Episode 3 (31 October) ===
- Group Performance: "Ghostbusters" by Ray Parker Jr.

Performances on the third episode
#	Stage name	Song	Identity	Result
1	Bambi	"Black Magic" by Little Mix	undisclosed	WIN
2	Eagle Owl	"Narcotic" by Liquido	Toby Alderweireld	OUT
3	Peacock	"Training Season" by Dua Lipa	undisclosed	WIN
4	King Crab	"Too Good at Goodbyes" by Sam Smith	undisclosed	RISK
5	Fluffs	"It's Raining Men" by The Weather Girls	undisclosed	SAFE
1	King Crab	"Dynamite" by BTS		
2	Eagle Owl	"Dynamite" by BTS		

=== Episode 4 (7 November) ===
Performances on the fourth episode
#	Stage name	Song	Identity	Result
1	Chinchilla	"María" by Ricky Martin	undisclosed	WIN
2	Broccoli	"Hold the Line" by Toto	undisclosed	RISK
3	Little Sheep	"Hello World" from The Saddle Club	undisclosed	WIN
4	Fortune	"Şımarık" by Tarkan	undisclosed	RISK
5	Violin	"Vampire" by Olivia Rodrigo	undisclosed	WIN
6	Cupid	"Heaven Must Be Missing an Angel" by Tavares	Ender Scholtens	OUT
7	Unicorn	"Marry the Night" by Lady Gaga	undisclosed	WIN

=== Episode 5 (14 November) ===
Performances on the fifth episode
#	Stage name	Song	Identity	Result
1	Broccoli	"Toxic" by Britney Spears	Philippe Geubels	OUT
2	Unicorn	"Pink Pony Club" by Chappell Roan	undisclosed	WIN
3	Chinchilla	"APT." by Rosé & Bruno Mars	undisclosed	WIN
4	Fortune	"Hot n Cold" by Katy Perry	undisclosed	RISK
5	Violin	"Nothing Else Matters" by Metallica	undisclosed	WIN
6	Little Sheep	"Hey Baby" by DJ Ötzi	undisclosed	RISK

=== Episode 6 (21 November) ===
Performances on the sixth episode
#	Stage name	Song	Identity	Result
1	Little Sheep	"Anxiety" by Doechii	undisclosed	SAFE
2	Unicorn	"She's Like the Wind" by Patrick Swayze and Wendy Fraser	undisclosed	SAFE
3	Chinchilla	"Stop" by Spice Girls	undisclosed	RISK
4	Fortune	"End of the World" by Miley Cyrus	Lynn Van den Broeck	OUT
5	Violin	"Abracadabra" by Lady Gaga	undisclosed	WIN
1	Chinchilla	"Can You Feel It" by The Jacksons		
2	Fortune	"Can You Feel It" by The Jacksons		

=== Episode 7 (28 November) ===
Performances on the seventh episode
#	Stage name	Song	Identity	Result
1	Peacock	"License to Kill" by Gladys Knight	Pauline Slangen	OUT
2	Little Sheep	"Warrior" by Oscar and the Wolf	undisclosed	WIN
3	Chinchilla	"Love Me to Heaven" by Jonas Brothers	undisclosed	RISK
4	Bambi	"When We Were Young" by Adele	undisclosed	WIN
5	King Crab	"FRIENDS" by Marshmello and Anne-Marie	undisclosed	RISK
6	Unicorn	"In My Blood" by Shawn Mendes	undisclosed	WIN
7	Fluffs	"Right Here Waiting" by Richard Marx	undisclosed	RISK
8	Violin	"Strobe Lights" by Red Sebastian	undisclosed	WIN

=== Episode 8 (5 December) ===
Performances on the eighth episode
#	Stage name	Song	Identity	Result
1	Fluffs	"Never Gonna Give You Up" by Rick Astley	De Romeo's	OUT
2	King Crab	"Next Summer" by Damiano David	undisclosed	WIN
3	Chinchilla	"Salsa Tequila" by Anders Nilsen	undisclosed	WIN
4	Little Sheep	"Homesick" by Dua Lipa	undisclosed	RISK
5	Unicorn	"Heroes" by Måns Zelmerlöw	undisclosed	WIN
6	Violin	"Ordinary" by Alex Warren	undisclosed	RISK
7	Bambi	"It's My Life" by Bon Jovi	undisclosed	WIN

=== Episode 9 (12 December) ===
Performances on the ninth episode
#	Stage name	Song	Identity	Result
1	Bambi	"Golden" from KPop Demon Hunters	undisclosed	WIN
2	Little Sheep	"Torn" by Natalie Imbruglia	Ingeborg	OUT
3	Violin	"In the End" by Linkin Park	undisclosed	WIN
4	Chinchilla	"I'll Be Waiting" by Cian Ducrot	undisclosed	RISK
5	King Crab	"Queen of Kings" by Alessandra	undisclosed	RISK
6	Unicorn	"Sign of the Times" by Harry Styles	undisclosed	WIN

=== Episode 10 (19 December) ===
- Group Performance: "Santa Claus Is Comin' to Town" by Bing Crosby

Performances on the tenth episode
#	Stage name	Song	Identity	Result
1	Chinchilla	"Feliz Navidad" by José Feliciano	undisclosed	RISK
2	Violin	"Underneath the Tree" by Kelly Clarkson	undisclosed	RISK
3	King Crab	"Sleigh Ride" by The Ronettes	undisclosed	RISK
4	Unicorn	"Last Christmas" by Wham!	undisclosed	WIN
5	Bambi	"All I Want for Christmas Is You" by Mariah Carey	undisclosed	WIN
Sing-off details
1	Chinchilla	"Do They Know It's Christmas?" by Band Aid	Dorothee Dauwe	OUT
2	Violin	"Do They Know It's Christmas?" by Band Aid	undisclosed	SAFE
3	King Crab	"Do They Know It's Christmas?" by Band Aid	undisclosed	SAFE

=== Episode 11 (26 December) ===
Performances on the eleventh episode
#	Stage name	Song	Identity	Result
1	Bambi	"Strangers" by Laura Tesoro feat. Alex Germys (duet with Laura Tesoro)	undisclosed	SAFE
1	Bambi	"Feest" by K3	undisclosed	SAFE
2	Violin	"Because of You" by Gustaph (duet with Gustaph)	LEEZ	OUT
2	Violin	"Sax" by Fleur East	LEEZ	OUT
3	Unicorn	"Whisper" by Milk Inc. (duet with Milk Inc.)	undisclosed	SAFE
3	Unicorn	"She Wolf (Falling to Pieces)" by David Guetta feat. Sia	undisclosed	SAFE
4	King Crab	"Swimming In The Pool" by The Radios (duet with Bart Peeters)	undisclosed	SAFE
4	King Crab	"New Rules" by Dua Lipa	undisclosed	SAFE

=== Episode 12 (2 January) - Finale ===
- Group Performance: "One Night Only" from Dreamgirls

Performances on the twelfth episode
#	Stage name	Song	Identity	Result
1	Bambi	"I Don't Want to Miss a Thing" by Aerosmith	Maureen Vanherbeghen	THIRD
1	Bambi	"Golden" from KPop Demon Hunters	Maureen Vanherbeghen	THIRD
2	Unicorn	"Crying at the Discoteque" by Alcazar	undisclosed	SAFE
2	Unicorn	"Marry the Night" by Lady Gaga	undisclosed	SAFE
3	King Crab	"The Rose" by Bette Midler	undisclosed	SAFE
3	King Crab	"Queen of Kings" by Alessandra	undisclosed	SAFE
Sing-off details
1	Unicorn	"A Million Dreams" from The Greatest Showman	Mathias Mesmans	RUNNER-UP
2	King Crab	"A Million Dreams" from The Greatest Showman	Jade Mintjens	WINNER
