= Miss Belgium 2020 =

- Date: January 11, 2020
- Venue: Plopsaland Theater, De Panne, Belgium
- Broadcaster: MENT TV
- Entrants: 32
- Winner: Céline Van Ouytsel; Antwerp

Miss Belgium 2020 was the 52nd edition of the Miss Belgium pageant, held on January 11, 2020 at the Plopsaland Theater in De Panne, Belgium. Elena Castro Suarez of Antwerp crowned her successor Céline Van Ouytsel of Antwerp at end of the event. Van Ouytsel represented Belgium at the Miss World 2021 pageant, but was unplaced.

== Results ==
Final Results	Contestant
Miss Belgium 2020	Antwerp — Céline Van Ouytsel
1st Runner-Up	West Flanders — Celest Decaestecker
2nd Runner-Up	Liège — Anicca Van Hollebeke
3rd Runner-Up	Namur — Blandine Frennet
4th Runner-Up	Luxembourg — Laura Vanquaillie
5th Runner-Up	Flemish Brabant — Elize Baron
Top 15	Antwerp - Donegul Kula; East Flanders - Chelsy De Witte; East Flanders - Inara Wytnick; East Flanders - Lorina Boterdaele; Hainaut - Marie Al-Nima; Limburg - Karen Jansen; Limburg - Nisa Van Baelen; Walloon Brabant - Marie Thomas; West Flanders - Marieke Vanieuwenhuyse

=== Special awards ===
Award	Contestant
Miss Talent	Namur — Blandine Frennet
Miss Beach	Liège — Anicca Van Hollebeke
Miss Social Media	Antwerp — Céline Van Ouytsel
Miss Sport	Antwerp — Caro Beugnier
Miss Charity	West Flanders — Marieke Vannieuwenhuyse
Miss Model	Flemish Brabant — Elize Baron

== Contestants ==
32 delegates will compete for the crown:

Province	Contestant	Age	Hometown
Antwerp	Céline Van Ouytsel	23	Herentals
Antwerp	Caro Beugnier	21	Antwerp
Antwerp	Donegul Kula	19	Heffen
Antwerp	Selena Ali	22	Stabroek
Brussels	Nihal Eddaghmoumi	23	Berchem-Sainte-Agathe
Brussels	Ines Benaisa	22	Uccle
Brussels	Cindy Wetzels	22	Berchem-Sainte-Agathe
East Flanders	Chelsy De Witte	20	Zelzate
East Flanders	Lorina Boterdaele	18	Oosterzele
East Flanders	Pauline Noyen	26	Evergem
East Flanders	Willemijn Pieters	16	Ninove
East Flanders	Inara Wytnick	23	Sleidinge
East Flanders	Orelie De Nul	22	Buggenhout
Flemish Brabant	Elize Baron	21	Herent
Flemish Brabant	Rebecca De Weerdt	17	Steenokkerzeel
Flemish Brabant	Yara Struvyen	17	Blanden
Hainaut	Marie Al-Nima	20	Masnuy-Saint-Jean
Hainaut	Furayah Kayembe	18	Mons
Hainaut	Sarah Chiry	23	Moulbaix
Hainaut	Bélinda Cerini	23	Thiméon
Liège	Anicca Van Hollebeke	23	Faimes
Liège	Amandine Toffoli	22	Seraing
Limburg	Nisa Van Baelen	19	Tessenderlo
Limburg	Alessia Murru	17	Genk
Limburg	Karen Jansen	18	Lommel
Luxembourg	Laura Vanquaillie	20	Bertrix
Namur	Blandine Frennet	20	Tongrinne
Namur	Gaëlle Delforge	20	Andenne
Walloon Brabant	Marie Thomas	20	Braine-le-Château
West Flanders	Celest Decaesstecker	19	Leffinge
West Flanders	Marieke Vannieuwenhuyse	27	Roeselare
West Flanders	Mohini Cellisa Mathoera	21	Ostend

== Observations ==
For the first time since 2013, the election was live streamed on the RTL Play1 platform. The pageant featured 32 candidates, while there were only 30 during the five previous elections.

During the evening gown competition part of the coronation night, Céline Van Ouytsel tripped on the hem of her dress causing her to fall on stage and even lost a bra which was inadvertently stuck in her long puffy sleeves. The fallen bra remained in the middle of the stage for a few minutes, and it was fully visible to the camera as the next contestant walked onstage. It was also reported that some finalists nearly fell in the stage during the swimsuit competition. The incident was widely reported in the media, to the point that Céline Van Ouytsel was interviewed about it and had to give her own comments on what exactly happened. Despite the incident, she managed to win the crown.
