= Voice Male =

All-male a cappella group from Utah, US

- Origin: Logan, Utah, U.S.
- Genre: A cappella
- Years active: 1994–present
- Members: John Luthy (1994-present); Richard McAllister (1994-present); John Huff (1994-2021); Mike Willson (1994-present); Mike Bearden (1995-present); Rick Murdock (2011-present)
- Past members: Phil Kesler (1995-2010); Jason Gerber (1994-1996); James Lyman (1994-1996); Joel Johnson (1995-1996); David Briggs (1994-1995); Lynn Nelson (1994-1995); Darin Dickey (1994-1995)
- Website: http://voicemalemusic.com

Voice Male is a six-man contemporary a cappella group based in Utah. The group performs covers of contemporary popular songs as well as traditional Latter-day Saint music and some original material. Voice Male formed at Utah State University in 1994 as a nine-man group. Over the next two years several members of the group left and auditions were held for replacements. A short time later two more members left, leaving the group with six members. Voice Male decided at that time to keep the group at six and they remained unchanged until 2010, when Phil Kesler died from cancer. Rick Murdock was officially added as a new member in 2011. Voice Male was the winner of the holiday album category in the 1999 Contemporary A Cappella Society for "Jingles", was runner up in the 2001 awards in the cover/pop song category for "Light in Your Eyes" from Hooked, was runner up in the 2006 awards in the holiday album category for Jingles 2, as well as the holiday song category for o come, o come Emmanuel.

== Members ==
- John Luthy, vocal percussion/bass
- Mike Willson, bass
- John Huff, baritone (died January 2021)
- Rick Murdock, baritone
- Mike Bearden, tenor
- Richard McAllister, countertenor

Phil Kesler, baritone, was part of this group before his death from cancer on February 11, 2010.

== Discography ==
- At the Tone..., 1995
- Voice Male, 1996
- up, up, and away..., 1997
- HIMS, 1997
- Jingles, 1998
- Hooked, 2000
- Six, 2001
- HIMS II, 2003
- Jingles 2, 2005
- Kids Stuff, 2008
- Christmas Live, 2010
- Jingles 3, 2012

== Awards ==
- Contemporary A Cappella Recording Awards (CARAs):
  - 1999: Best Holiday Album: "Jingles"
  - 2001: Best Pop/Rock Cover Song Runner-up: "Light in Your Eyes" from "Hooked"
  - 2006: Best Holiday Album Runner-up: "Jingles 2"
  - 2006: Best Holiday Song Runner-up: "o come, o come Emmanuel" from "Jingles 2"
