= Danira Boukhriss =

Flemish television presenter and newscaster

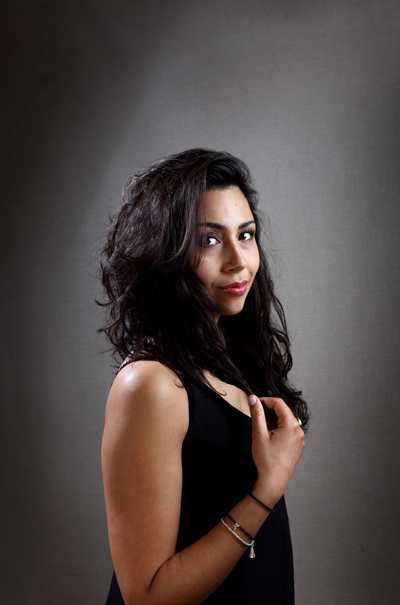
- Born: Danira Boukhriss Terkessidis; 12 August 1990 (age 35); Vilvoorde, Belgium
- Occupations: Journalist, television presenter

Danira Boukhriss Terkessidis (Vilvoorde, 12 August 1990) is a Flemish television presenter and newscaster.

Boukhriss studied modern languages and literature (Dutch, English and Spanish) at the Vrije Universiteit Brussel, and has been working for the Flemish public television broadcaster VRT since 2012. She first worked behind the scenes for the tourist series Vlaanderen Vakantieland and then moved to VRT News in mid-2013, where she mainly worked as a television reporter for Het Journaal. In 2015, she came into the spotlight when suffering racist abuse due to her mixed Greek and Moroccan origin while covering a Pegida demonstration.

In addition to her journalistic work, Boukhriss presented the reportage programme Login on the Canvas channel from autumn 2013 to autumn 2014. From autumn 2015 to mid-2016 she presented the report programme Koppen XL on Eén. In 2016, she took temporary leave as a reporter for Het Journaal to participate in the nutrition program Over Eten, with Kobe Ilsen.
