= Belle Perez =

Belgian-Spanish musician

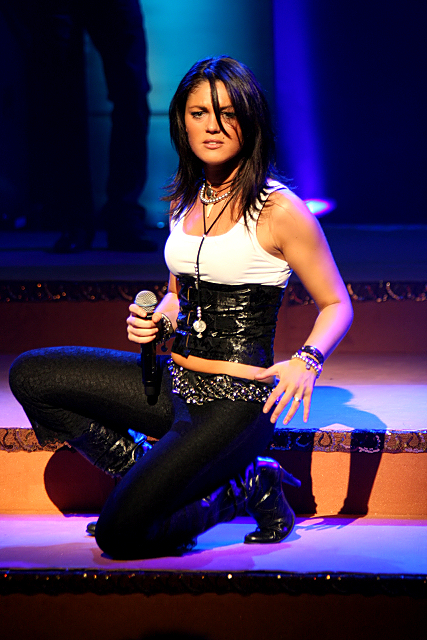
- Belle Perez (Beatrixtheater 2008)
- Born: Maribel Pérez; 29 January 1976 (age 50); Neerpelt, Belgium
- Occupation: Musician

Maribel Pérez (born 29 January 1976), best known by her stage name Belle Perez, is a Belgian-Spanish musician and songwriter.

Born in Neerpelt to Spanish parents as María Isabelle Pérez Cerezo, the Flemish singer was discovered for her musical talents by Patrick Renier at a local talent show in 1997 at the age of 21. In 1999 she participated in the Belgian preselections of the Eurovision Song Contest 1999 and from then on Belle's career in music took off. She started off in pop music but in 2002 she changed her style to Latino/pop and went live on stage with her own "Baila Perez"-band. The album that came with it was an instant success and remained on the top spot in the Belgian charts for several weeks.

As of 2006, she has achieved a relatively high level of fame in her native Belgium and the Netherlands. She has also become the presenter of a popular Dutch music show. Perez participated in the Belgian tryouts for the 2006 Eurovision Song Contest, but ended up getting 3rd place. Her newest album Gotitas De Amor was released on 23 August 2006. In December 2006 she released her 4th single of "Gotitas de amor", called "Hoy (Le pido a dios)", a ballad.

On 5 May she will be performing another "Mega Latino"-Concert in the Sportpaleis Antwerp. She will be performing in front of about 15,000 people. According to some articles on her fan-site she is planning to release a CD in Germany, Austria and Switzerland upcoming summer. She has already signed a contract. Due to some rumours "El mundo bailando" is going to be the first single in Germany, Austria and Switzerland.

Before summer she will release another single from her album "Gotitas De Amor" in Belgium and Netherlands which will be "Amor Latino" and it peaked in Belgium on Position 11.

In June 2007 she released her first album "Gotitas De Amor" and the first single "El Mundo Bailando" in Germany, Austria and Switzerland. In the meantime she recorded a new single called "Djolei! Djolei!" which was released on 15 June 2007 in Belgium and Netherlands. Once again it is a song for the upcoming summer and so she is heading again for her next Radio 2-Summer-Award-Trophy in August 2007. She also posed twice for the men's magazine FHM.

In 2008 Belle Pérez and her spouse Mario Winters, with whom she had been a couple as early as 1995 and whom she married in the deepest secret in 2000, broke up after an 8-year marriage. Some months later Belle met 25-year-old Dutch jewel designer Wouter van der Horst in Antwerp, and they have been going steady since then.

Belle released her new album "Gipsy" in 2008 and made the top10 in both Belgium and The Netherlands. Appreciation in The Netherlands for her music grows and tours bring Belle more to there than to Belgium. In 2009 Belle celebrates her 10-year career. A book has been published containing her ups and downs in the last 10 years and a DVD has been released of a concert without any audience. At the same time a big concert was announced for the fall of 2009. However, in September 2009 it was announced that the big concert originally planned is downsized: a smaller concert hall but a sold-out crowd. Belle and her team state that she will go in a new direction with her music and that she wants to try new international adventures. She separates from her manager at that time, Patrick Renier, and goes on with Hugo Foets who also has been in the background.

For the second year in a row she is asked to be a special musical guest in the Holiday on Ice Shows. In 2008 she did them in Belgium, in 2009 in The Netherlands. After these shows she will focus on her new tour in The Netherlands: a theater tour "Latino Mundial".

== Discography ==
=== Albums ===
Year	Title	Peak positions					Information
Year	Title	BE	NL	GER	AT	CH	Information
2000	Hello World	13	-	-	-	-	First studio album
2001	Everything	10	-	-	-	-	Second studio album
2003	Baila Perez	1	20	-	-	-	Third studio album; First Spanish album; Gold award for 25.000 copies sold in Belgium
2004	Arena 2004	9	-	-	-	-	Fourth studio album; Spanish and English songs
2005	The Best of Belle Perez	2	-	-	-	-	Best-Of compilation; Only released in Belgium
2005	Que viva la vida	-	9	-	-	-	Compilation of former Hits; Only released in Netherlands
2006 / 2007	Gotitas de Amor	3	4	-	-	-	Fifth studio album; First album in Germany, Austria and Switzerland; Released in GER, AT & CH on 22 June 2007; Special Edition: Edición Especial with Live-Material from the "Sportpaleis"-Concert; Gold-Award for 35.000 sold copies in NL
2007	Greatest Latin Hits	-	12	-	-	-	Compilation of former hits; Only released in Netherlands
2008	Gipsy	9	5	-	-	-	Sixth studio album; Recorded Fall 2007; Release 20 June 2008
2016	Agua y Fuego	6	36	-	-	-	Seventh studio album; Release 19 February 2016
2019	Fiesta Perez	16	82	-	-	-	Released 31 May 2019

=== Singles ===
Year	Title	Peak positions							Notes
Year	Title	BEL	NLD	AUS	NZ	GER	AUT	SWI	Notes
1999	"Hello World"; Hello World	61	84	54	42	-	-	-	Second place in the Semi-final 1 of Eurosong '99 (Belgian national final for the Eurovision Song Contest 1999); Soundtrack to the movie Down to You; Theme song for The Saddle Club
2000	"Honeybee"; Hello World	6	67	-	-	-	-	-	
2000	"This Crazy Feeling"; Hello World	60	-	-	-	-	-	-	
2000	"Kiss and Make Up"; Hello World	50	-	-	-	-	-	-	
2001	"Planet of Love"; Everything	40	-	-	-	-	-	-	
2001	"Get Up and Boogie"; Everything	29	61	-	-	-	-	-	
2002	"Me & You"; Everything	10	8	-	-	-	-	-	Radio 2 Sommerhit-Award 2002; featuring Jody Bernal
2002	"Everything"; Everything	66	-	-	-	-	-	-	
2003	Hijo De La Luna; Everything	8	28	-	-	-	-	-	featuring Voice Male
2003	"Bailaremos"; Baila Perez	15	57	-	-	-	-	-	
2003	"Enamorada"; Baila Perez	7	45	-	-	-	-	-	Radio 2 Summerhit-Awards 2003
2003	"Sobreviviré"; Baila Perez	34	-	-	-	-	-	-	planned as a release in Germany, Austria and Switzerland
2004	"Light of My Life"; Arena 2004	11	-	-	-	-	-	-	Radio 2 Summerhit-Award 2004
2004	"Loca De Amor"; Arena 2004	23	-	-	-	-	-	-	
2004	"El Ritmo Caliente"; Baila Perez / Arena 2004	Promo	38	-	-	-	-	-	Original live version of a 1999 hit from Esperanza: The Movie
2005	"Que Viva La Vida (Chiquitan)"; The Best Of / Que Viva La Vida	2	2	-	-	-	-	-	Radio 2 Summerhit-Award 2005
2005	"Dime"; The Best Of / Que Viva La Vida	9	16	-	-	-	-	-	
2006	"El Mundo Bailando"; Gotitas De Amor	1	7	-	-	109	-	-	Third Position at the Belgium Qualifying Show for the Eurovision Song Contest 2006; First Single in Germany, Austria & Switzerland, released on 15 June 2007
2006	"Ave Maria"; Gotitas De Amor	11	18	-	-	-	-	-	Cover-Version of a song from Spanish singer David Bisbal; Radio 2 Summerhit-Award 2006
2006	"Gotitas De Amor"; Gotitas De Amor	63	61	-	-	-	-	-	
2006	"Hoy (Le Pido A Dios)"; Gotitas De Amor	74	63	-	-	-	-	-	
2007	"Amor Latino"; Gotitas De Amor	11	50	-	-	-	-	-	
2007	"Djolei, Djolei!"; Greatest Latin Hits	32	40	-	-	-	-	-	Participant at the Radio 2 Summerhit-Awards 2007
2008	"Dime Que Tu Quieres"; Gipsy	10	6	-	-	-	-	-	Release date: 16 May 2008
2008	"Amame"; Gipsy	24	90	-	-	-	-	-	Release date: 15 August 2008
2008	"Tú / You"; Gipsy	-	31	-	-	-	-	-	Release date: November 2008; English version of "You" from her Holiday on Ice Show
2010	"La Colegiala" -	14	79	-	-	-	-	-	Release date: 16 July 2010
2011	"Shake It Out"	75	-	-	-	-	-	-	
2016	"Ponte a cantar"	55	-	-	-	-	-	-	
2018	"Rumba"	60	-	-	-	-	-	-	
2019	"Indirectas"	66	-	-	-	-	-	-	
2019	"Qué Hay de Mal" (with Rolf Sanchez)	98	-	-	-	-	-	-	
2025	"Let the Sunshine In"	42	-	-	-	-	-	-	

=== DVDs ===
- Baila Perez (2003)
- The Best of Belle Perez (2005)Gold (16.000 sold copies in Belgium)
- Mega Latino Concert – Sportpaleis Antwerpen (2006)
- Diez (2009)

== Awards and achievements ==
- 2000 – Zamu Award – "Best Pop Artist"
- 2002 – Golden Award for single "Me & You" (both in The Netherlands & Belgium)
- 2002 – Zomerhit Award 'Me And You' Ft Jody Bernal
- 2003 – Platinum Award for "Baila Perez"
- 2003 – Zomerhit Award 'Enamorada'
- 2004 – Zomerhit Award 'Light of My Life'
- 2005 – Zomerhit Award 'Que Viva La Vida'
- 2005 – Radio 2 Zomerhit "Favorite of the public" Award
- 2005 – TMF Award – "Best Female Artist"
- 2006 – Zomerhit Award Radio 2 'Ave Maria'
- 2006 – Radio 2 Zomerhit "Favorite of the public" Award

== Tours ==
- Bailando 2006 (Belgium&Netherlands)May 2006 – November 2006
- The Best of Belle Perez Live 2005/2006 (Belgium&Netherlands) August 2005 – March 2006
- Bailando Tour 2006 (Belgium&Netherlands) March – September 2006
- Latin Fever Tour 2006/2007 (Belgium&Netherlands) September 2006 – March 2007
- Summer Tour 2007 (Netherlands) March – July 2007
- Latin Days Tour 2007 (Netherlands) August 2007 – November 2007
- Gipsy Live Tour 2008 (Belgium&Netherlands) December 2007 – January 2008
- Gipsy Live Tour 2008, Part Two (Netherlands) January 2008 – April 2008
- Diez Tour (Netherlands) January 2009 – April 2009
- Special Guest @ Holiday on Ice (Netherlands) October 2009 – January 2010
- Latino Mundial (Netherlands) January 2010 – April 2010
