= Céline Van Ouytsel =

Belgium beauty pageant titleholder

- Born: Herentals, Belgium
- Education: University of Antwerp (LLM)
- Height: 1.73 m (5 ft 8 in)
- Beauty pageant titleholder
- Title: Miss Antwerp 2020; Miss Belgium 2020
- Hair color: Blonde
- Eye color: Blue
- Major competitions: Miss Belgium 2020 (Winner); Miss World 2022 (Unplaced)

Céline Van Ouytsel is a Belgian beauty pageant titleholder who won Miss Belgium 2020, and represented Belgium at Miss World 2022.

== Early life ==
Van Ouytsel was born in Herentals, Antwerp, Belgium. She attended the University of Antwerp, where she received a Master of Laws degree.

== Pageantry ==
Van Ouytsel's first pageant was Miss Antwerp 2016, where she was the second runner-up. She returned to pageantry four years later, when she competed in and won Miss Antwerp 2020.

=== Miss Belgium 2020 ===
Van Ouytsel represented Antwerp and won Miss Belgium 2020. She was also awarded the title Miss Social Networks. While competing in the evening gown portion of Miss Belgium, Van Ouytsel fell on stage, which resulted in a bra that had been stuck to her gown falling off and being left behind on stage; this received widespread attention throughout the Belgian media.

This made her the seventh consecutive Flemish woman to win, and the fifth to come from the Antwerp Province in a span of six years. As Miss Belgium, Van Ouytsel competed in Miss World 2021.

Awards and achievements
Preceded by Elena Castro Suarez, Antwerp	Miss Belgium; 2020	Succeeded by Kedist Deltour, East Flanders
