= Jade Mintjens =

Belgian comedian and actor (born 1998)

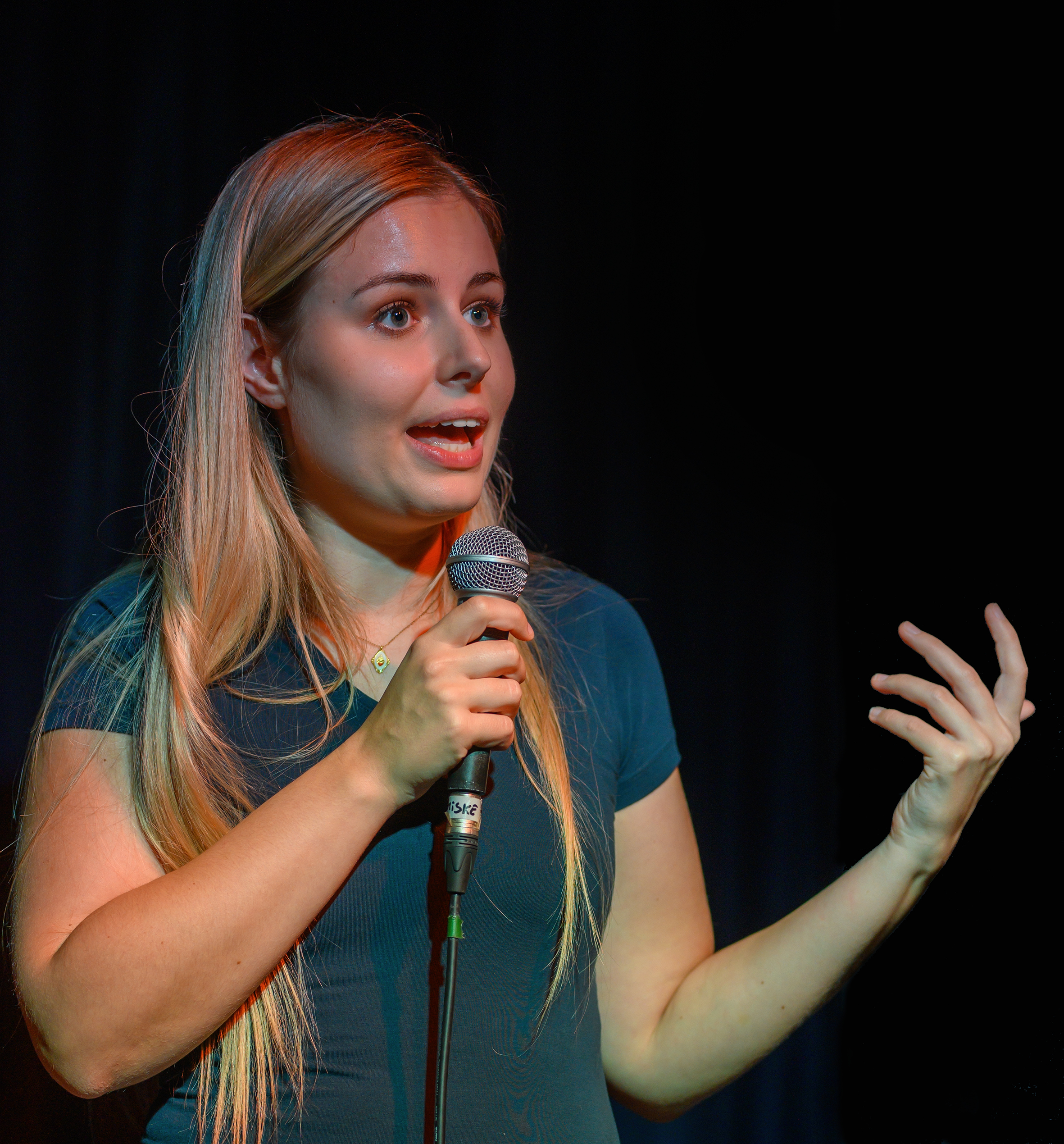
- Mintjens in 2023
- Born: October 7, 1998 (age 27); Turnhout, Antwerp, Belgium
- Years active: 2013–present
- Known for: Actress, comedy
- Television: De Ideale Wereld, Ik Heb U Letterlijk Juist Gezegd, De Slimste Mens ter Wereld 2023

Jade Mintjens (born October 7, 1998) is a Belgian stand-up comedian and actor. Since 2021, she is a permanent member of the editorial staff in the Canvas television show De Ideale Wereld (English: The Ideal World). In addition, Mintjens has also been touring Flanders with her show Bedankt om te Komen (English: Thanks for Coming) since February 2024.

== Biography ==
In a 2013 interview, Mintjens stated that she wanted to do something later in life related to media. In her youth, she once attempted to become the face of a former Belgian children's media channel. Mintjens wanted to be an actress since her childhood. In 2014 and 2015, she acted in the Belgian theater troupe fABULEUS in a production of De Metsiers, based on the novel by Hugo Claus. As a child, she enjoyed watching stand-up comedians, but she could not imagine herself on stage as a comedian.

Dutch: Ik vertelde tien jaar geleden in de krant dat ik fan was van Alex Agnew en Xander De Rycke. Maar het is pas in Voor de leeuwen (een tv-programma uit 2017 waarin Bart Peeters samenwerkte met jong talent, red.) dat ik mijn komisch kantje ontdekte. Ik was er ooit van overtuigd dat ik enkel en alleen actrice wilde worden. En vooral om dramatische rollen te spelen. Zoiets zie ik mezelf in de toekomst ook nog doen, maar ik weet nu al dat mijn leven niet meer zonder stand-upcomedy kan.

[Ten years ago, I told the newspapers that I was a fan of Alex Agnew and Xander De Rycke. But it was only in Voor de Leeuwen (English: For the Lions) (a 2017 television show in which Bart Peeters worked alongside young talent) that I discovered my comedic side. I was once convinced that I only wanted to be an actress, and only play dramatic roles. I see myself doing something like that in the future, but I know now that my life could no longer be without stand up comedy.]

— Jade Mintjens

== Career ==
=== As a stand-up comedian ===
- Her first stand-up set ever was in the 2017 VRT program Voor de Leeuwen, the moment that she "realized her talent as a stand-up comedian".
- In 2019 Mintjens was the opener/support act for fellow Flemish stand-up comedians Bart Cannaerts and Xander De Rycke.
- In 2019 she was part of Michael Van Peel's The Young Ones tour.
- At the end of 2022 and the beginning of 2023, she performed an end-of-year conference Samen door 2022 (English: Together through 2022)
- Since 2024, she has been touring with her indoor show Bedankt om te komen (English: Thanks for Coming), which premiered on February 1.

=== On the radio ===
- De Rechtvaardige Rechters
- Radio2 weekwatchers

=== As an actress ===
- In 2014 Mintjens began as an actress in the theater troupe fABULEUS in a production of De Metsiers, a play based upon the titular book by Belgian author Hugo Claus.
- In 2017 she played the role of Eva in the Ketnet series Ghost Rockers.
- In 2020 she played the lead role in the VTM GO-mockumentary Instafamous.

=== Television ===
- Since 2021 she has been a permanent cohost on the Canvas program De Ideale Wereld. She also contributes to the program's editing and stars in the show's sketches.
- Since 2023 she has been the board head of the question makers of the Belgian Dutch-language quiz show Ik heb het u letterlijk juist gezegd.
- In 2023 she took part in the program De Slimste Mens ter Wereld (English: The Smartest Person in the World), which she won one episode. In her second episode, she lost the final game against Belgian film director Robin Pront.

== Awards and recognitions ==
- 2019: the first female finalist of the Lunatic Comedy Award.
- 2021: advanced to the finale of Humo's Comedy Cup alongside Charles Le Riche and Vincent Voeten.
