= 2 Fabiola =

Belgian electronic dance music group

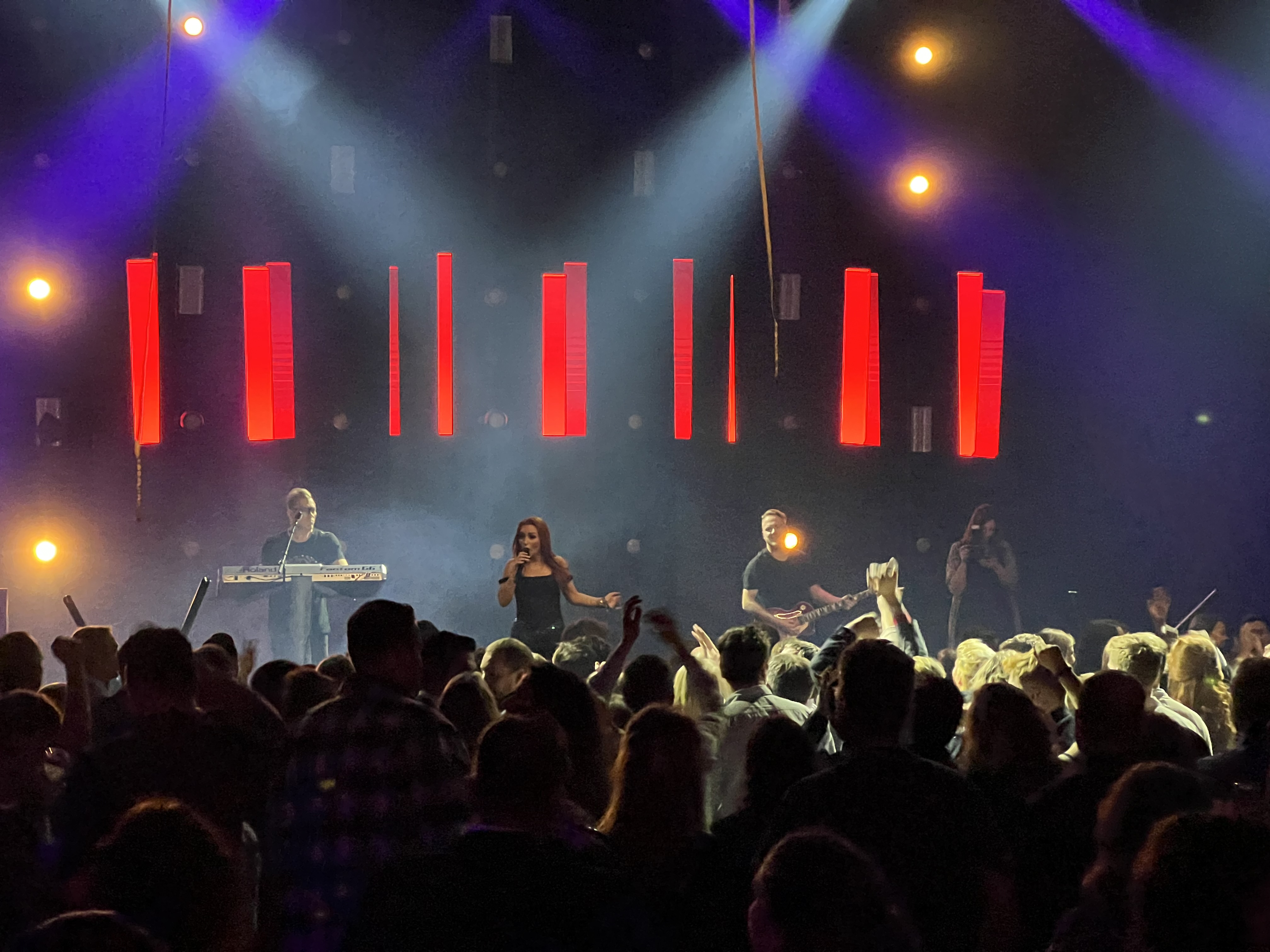

Background information
- Origin: Aarschot, Belgium
- Genres: Electronica; house; Eurodance; techno; trance
- Years active: 1991-present
- Members: Katie Michaelson; Loredana De Amicis; Patrick Claesen; Viola Furleo-Semeraro
- Past members: Oliver Adams; Zohra

2 Fabiola is a Belgian electronic dance music group, formed in 1991 by Pat Krimson (Patrick Claesen) and Zohra. The group got its name from Queen Fabiola of Belgium.

The group was noted for its lavish and extravagant clothes and performances. It has also made the charts in the Belgian Ultratop and had success in Spain. In the Ultratop 50 and Ultratop 50, they topped the charts. In 1999, the group took a break. Zohra started a solo career, and Pat Krimson led another project of his, called Nunca. After a while, a new 2 Fabiola was presented to the world, introducing singer Evi Goffin (Medusa, Lasgo).

After releasing some singles, the group disappeared from the Belgian music scene.

In 2007, Krimson announced the band's comeback, introducing two new singers. Their last single, "Blow Me Away", was published in July 2008.

In 2014 the group had a major hit with "She's After My Piano", after participating in the Belgium national selection for Eurovision Song Contest 2014. This song was co-written by Romanian-Norwegian artist Ovi who, for the second time, participated in the Eurovision Song Contest 2014 with duet partner Paula Seling. The two artists recorded their own version of the song for Ovi's album, A Bit of Pop Won't Hurt Anyone, (May 2014 daWorks).

== Discography ==
=== Studio albums ===
Title	Details	Peak chart positions
Title	Details	BEL (Fl)
Tyfoon	Release date: 1996; Label: Circus; Format: CD	5
Androgyne	Release date: December 2, 1998; Label: Atmoz; Format: CD	27
Evolution	Release date: November 11, 2016; Label: Universal; Formats: CD, digital download	67
"—" denotes releases that did not chart

=== Singles ===
Year	Single	Peak chart positions			Album
Year	Single	BEL (FL)	BEL (WA)	SPA	Album
1991	"The Milky Way"	—	—	—	Singles only
1992	"Kunta Kinte"	—	—	—	Singles only
1993	"Mission of Love"	—	—	—	Singles only
1993	"My Attitude"	—	—	—	Tyfoon
1995	"Play This Song"	—	—	1	Tyfoon
1995	"Lift U Up"	1	—	2	Tyfoon
1996	"I'm on Fire"	2	40	4	Tyfoon
1996	"Universal Love"	19	—	—	Tyfoon
1996	"Freak Out"	2	—	6	Tyfoon
1997	"Magic Flight"	3	—	—	Androgyne
1998	"Flashback"	3	—	—	Androgyne
1998	"Sisters and Brothers"	17	—	—	Androgyne
1998	"Feel the Vibe"	25	—	—	Androgyne
1999	"New Year's Day" (featuring Medusa)	12	—	—	Singles only
2000	"Summer in Space" (featuring Medusa)	28	—	—	Singles only
2007	"Straight to the Top" (featuring Katie Michaelson)	30	—	—	Singles only
2008	"Blow Me Away"	33	—	—	Singles only
2009	"Lift U Up 2009"	—	—	—	Singles only
2010	"Push It Up"	—	—	—	Singles only
2011	"Don't Stop"	—	—	—	Singles only
2014	"She's After My Piano" (featuring Loredana De Amicis)	6	—	—	Singles only
"—" denotes releases that did not chart
