= Boris Van Severen =

Belgian actor

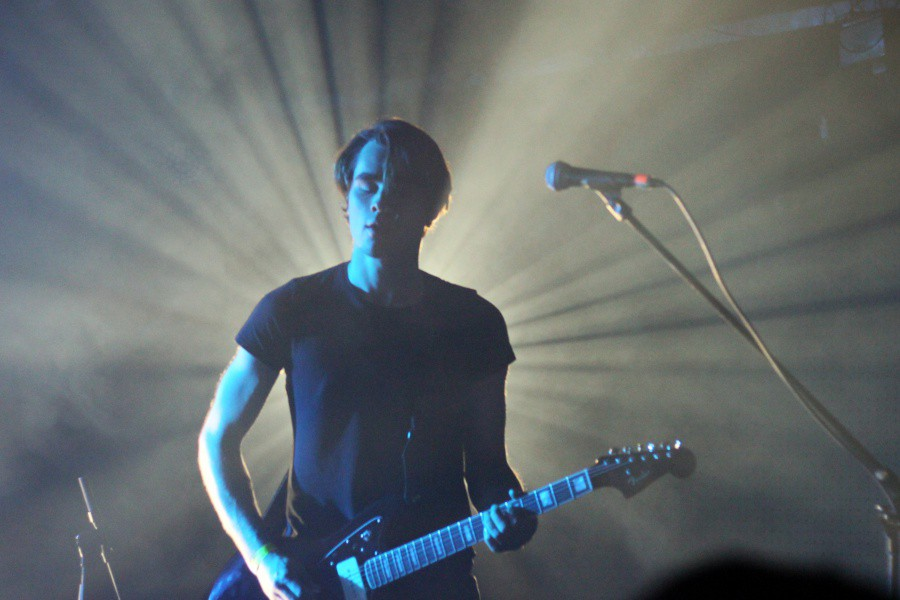
- Boris Van Severen in 2016
- Born: 1989; Ghent, Belgium
- Occupation: Actor
- Years active: 2003-present
- Notable work: Baptiste (TV series)

Boris Van Severen is a Belgian actor who became known to the general public for his role as rockstar Davy Coppens in Felix Van Groeningen's film Belgica.
