= The Masked Singer (Belgian TV series) season 1 =

The Masked Singer
- Season 1
- Promotional poster for season one, featuring the host, "Queen", "Wolf" and "Dragonfly"
- Starring: Jens Dendoncker; Julie Van den Steen; Karen Damen
- Hosted by: Niels Destadsbader
- Winner: Sandra Kim as "Queen"
- Runner-up: Giovanni Kemper as "Diver"
- No. of episodes: 8

Release
- Original network: VTM
- Original release: 18 September – 6 November 2020

Season chronology
- Next → Season 2

The first season of The Masked Singer based on the Masked Singer franchise which originated from the South Korean version of the show King of Mask Singer. It premiered on VTM on 18 September 2020, and is hosted by Niels Destadsbader. The season was won by singer Sandra Kim as "Queen", with actor-singer Giovanni Kemper finishing second as "Diver", and actor Kevin Janssens placing third as "Wolf".

The season was very successful with every episode having more than 1 million viewers. The final made a record with having more than 2 million viewers, giving broadcoaster VTM the highest rating in more than 20 years. The Masked Singer was the best-watched program of 2020 in Flanders. One of the highlights of this season was the instant recognition by panelist Damen of her ex-colleague Aerts. Their reunion after the unmasking of Aerts even made headlines in the Netherlands.

Because of the high ratings, the show was renewed for a second season.

== Cast ==
=== Panelists and host ===
Niels Destadsbader was the host of the series. Jens Dendoncker, Julie Van den Steen and Karen Damen were permanent members of the panel. In every episode, there was another guest judge.

Episode	Guest judge
1	Sean Dhondt
2	Leen Dendievel
3	Guga Baúl
4	Ingeborg
5	Laura Tesoro
6	Vincent Banić
7	Lize Feryn
8	Sean Dhondt

Karen Damen guessed eight out of ten contestants correctly, making her the highest scoring judge. Julie Van den Steen only managed to guess three contestants. Jens Dendocker didn't guess any of the contestants.

== Contestants ==
Stage name	Celebrity	Occupation	Episodes							
Stage name	Celebrity	Occupation	1	2	3	4	5	6	7	8
Koningin ("Queen")	Sandra Kim	Singer	WIN	WIN	WIN	WIN	WIN	SAFE	SAFE	WINNER
Duiker ("Diver")	Giovanni Kemper	Dancer	WIN	WIN	WIN	WIN	RISK	SAFE	SAFE	RUNNER-UP
Wolf	Kevin Janssens	Actor	WIN	WIN	RISK	RISK	WIN	RISK	SAFE	THIRD
Suikerspin ("Candyfloss") (WC)	Nora Gharib	Actress			WIN	RISK	RISK	SAFE	OUT	
Aap ("Monkey")	Ruth Beeckmans	Actress	RISK	WIN	WIN	RISK	WIN	OUT		
Zeemeermin ("Mermaid") (WC)	Kathleen Aerts	Singer		RISK	RISK	WIN	OUT			
Duiveltje ("Devil")	Andy Peelman	Actor	WIN	RISK	RISK	OUT				
Otter	Sam Bettens	Singer	RISK	RISK	OUT					
Libelle ("Dragonfly")	Dina Tersago	TV Personality	RISK	OUT						
Monster	Bart Tommelein	Politician	OUT							

The masked singer was safe from elimination.
The masked singer won their face-off and remained in the competition.
The masked singer lost their face-off, but was not eliminated.
The masked singer was eliminated from the competition and unmasked upon their elimination.
The masked singer did not perform.
The masked singer won the competition.
The masked singer finished second.
The masked singer finished third.
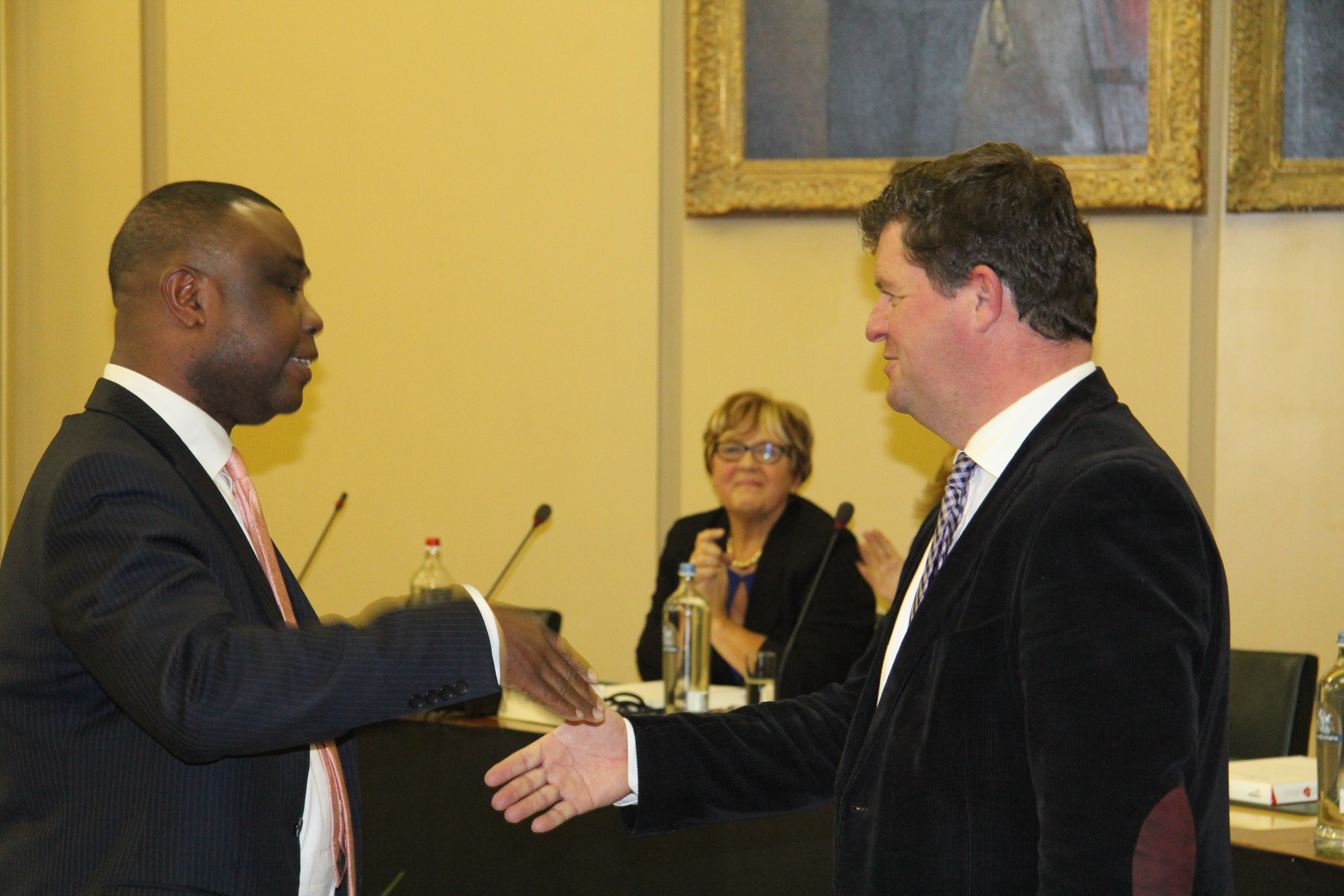
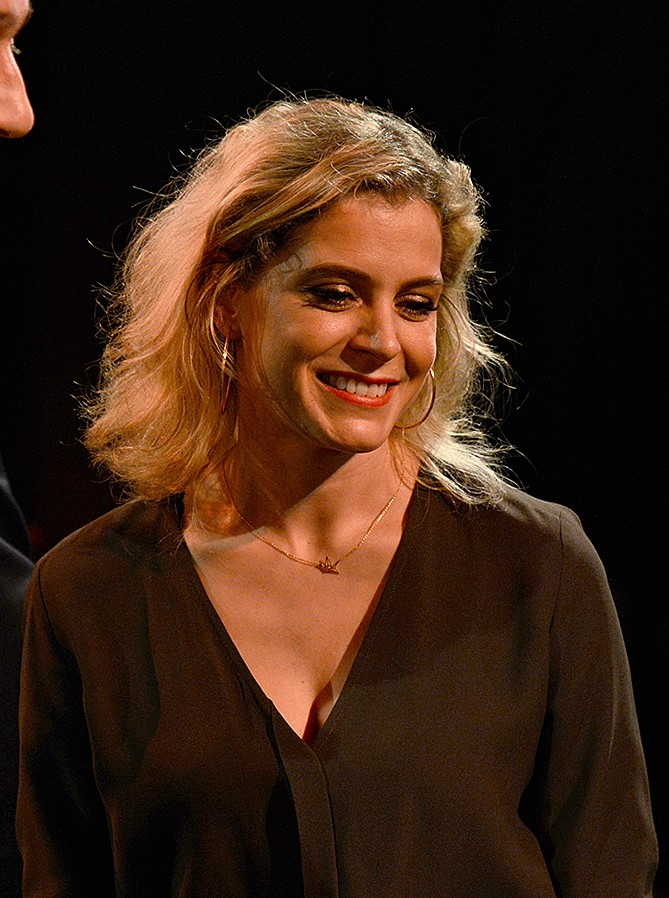
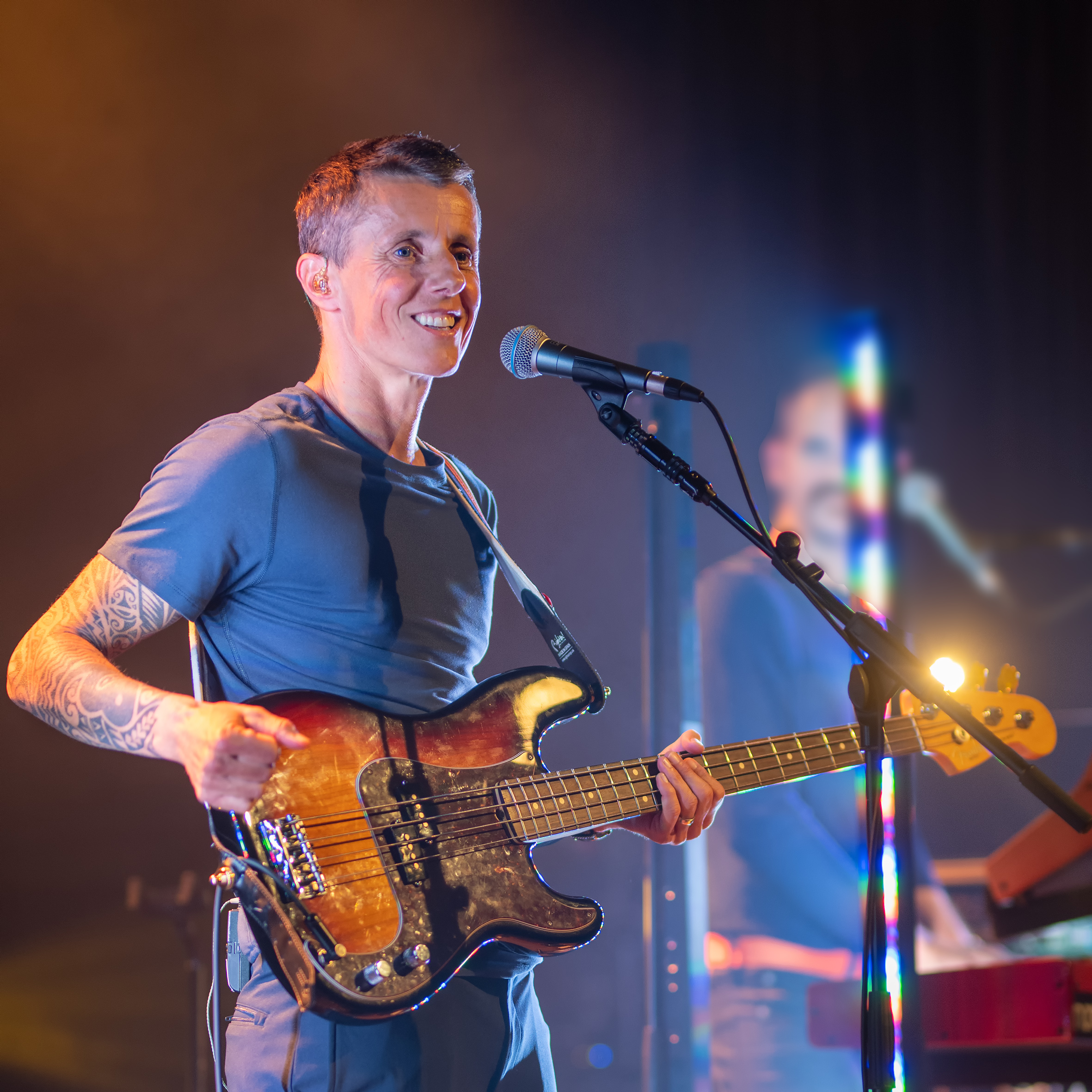
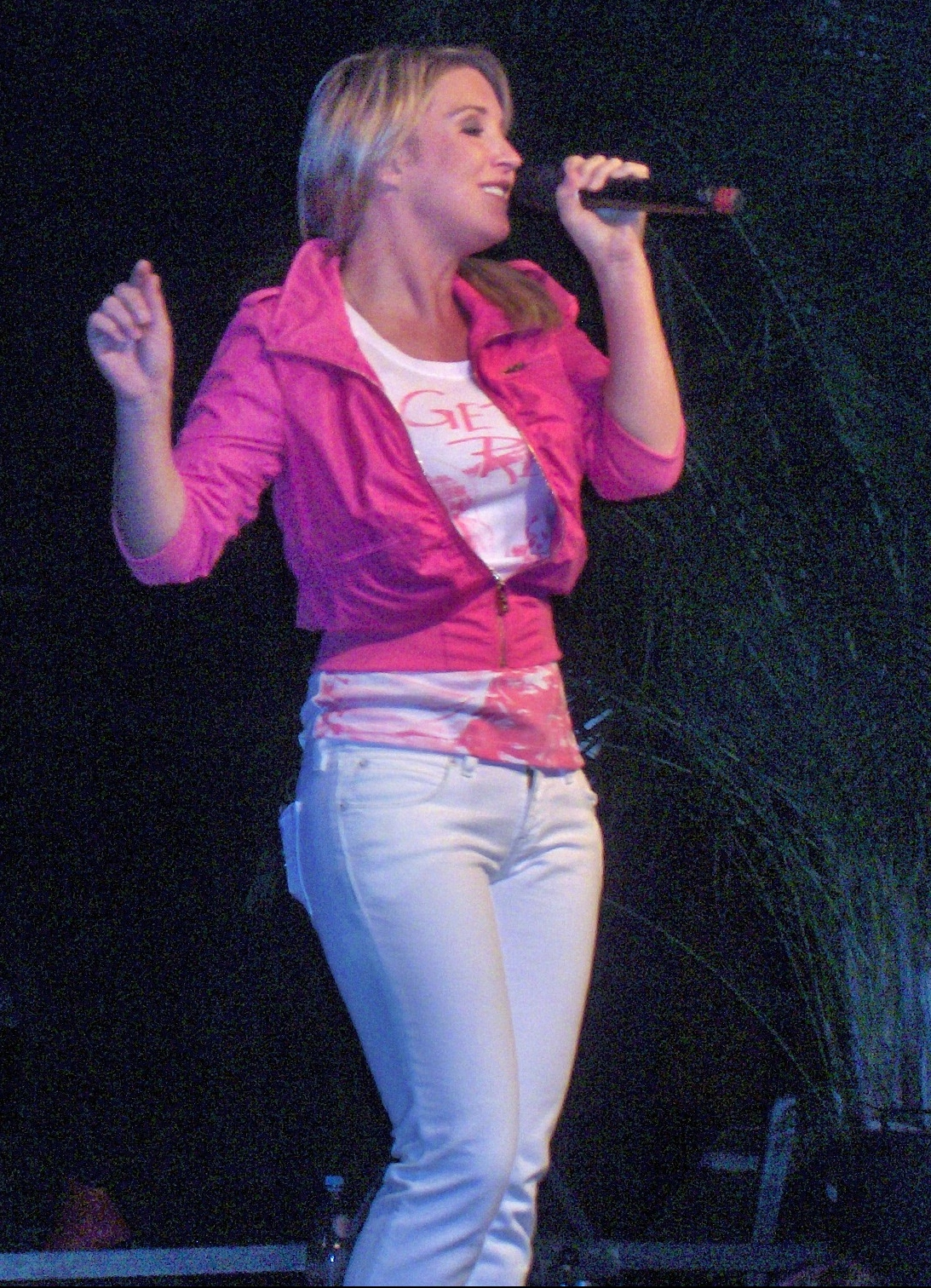
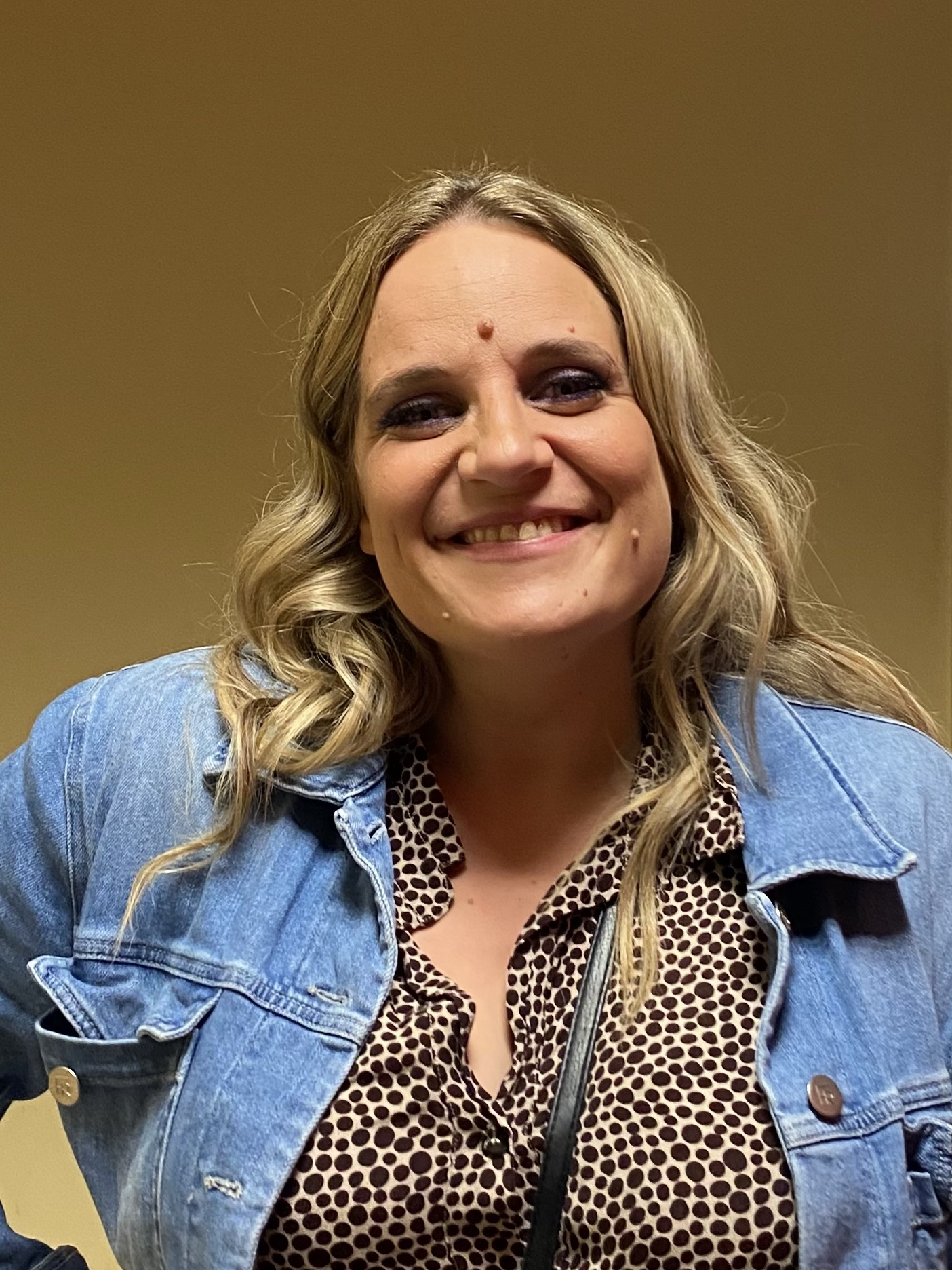
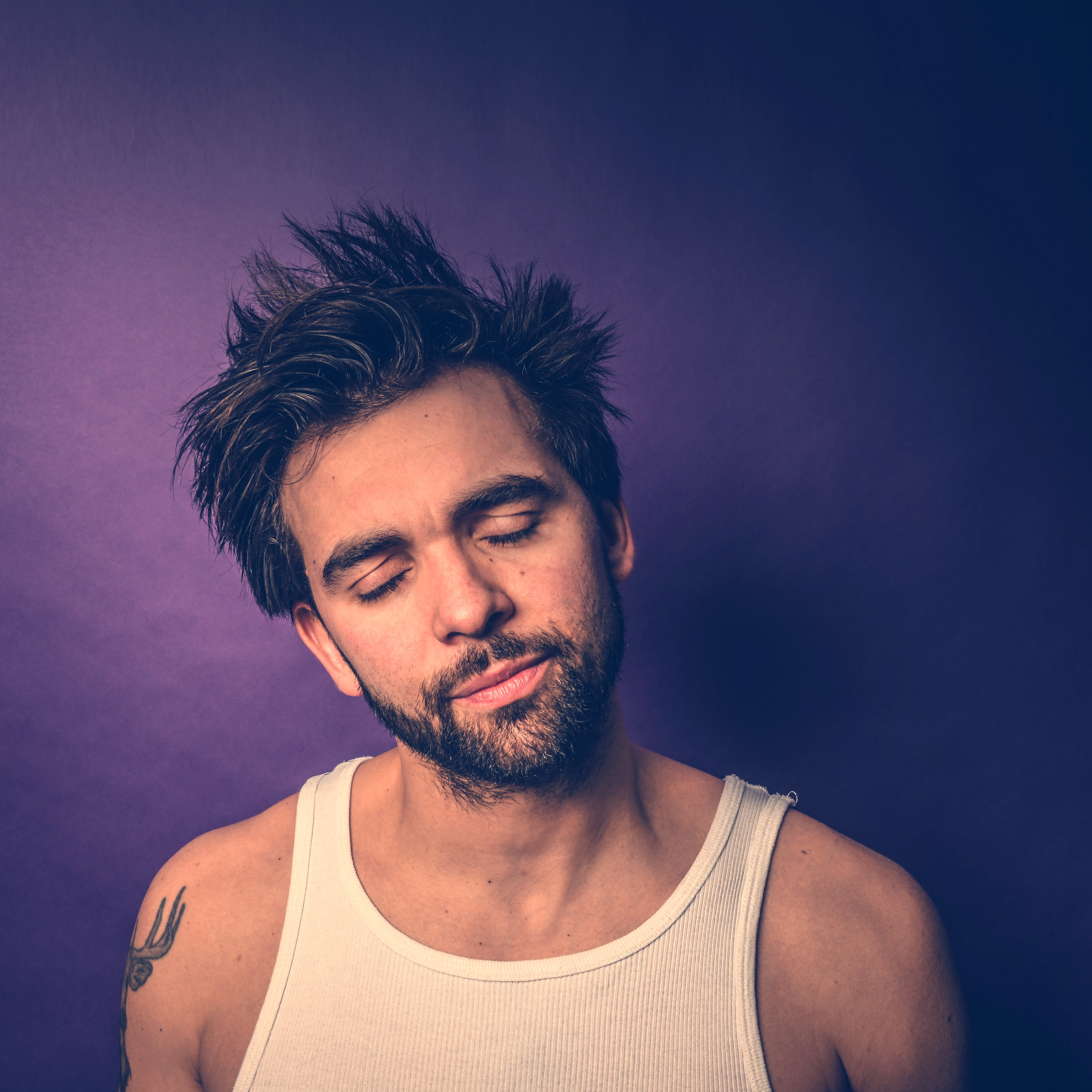
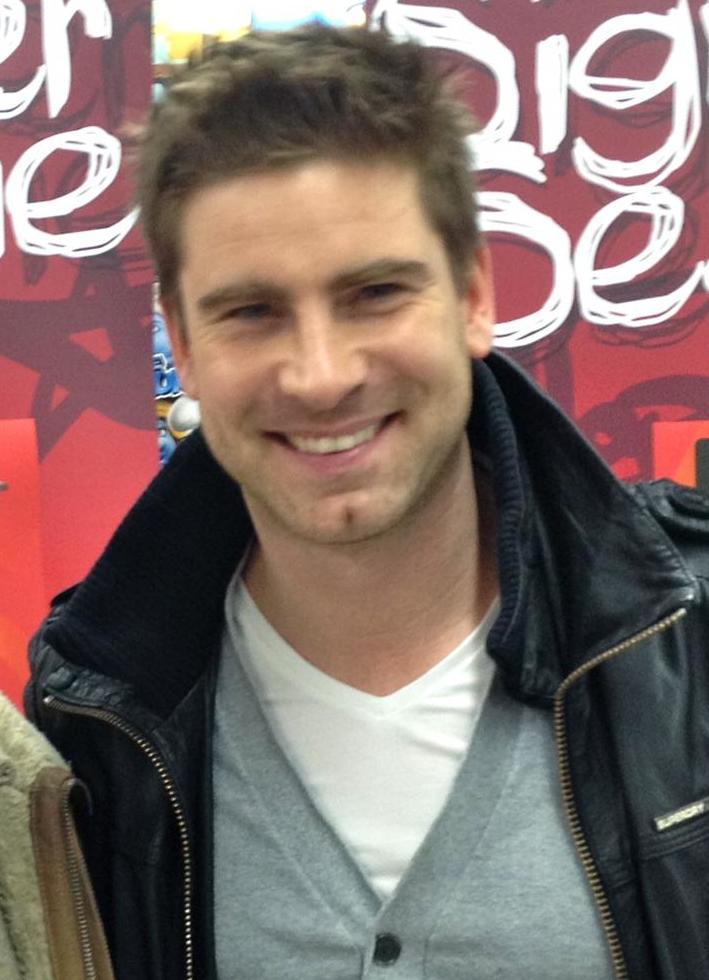
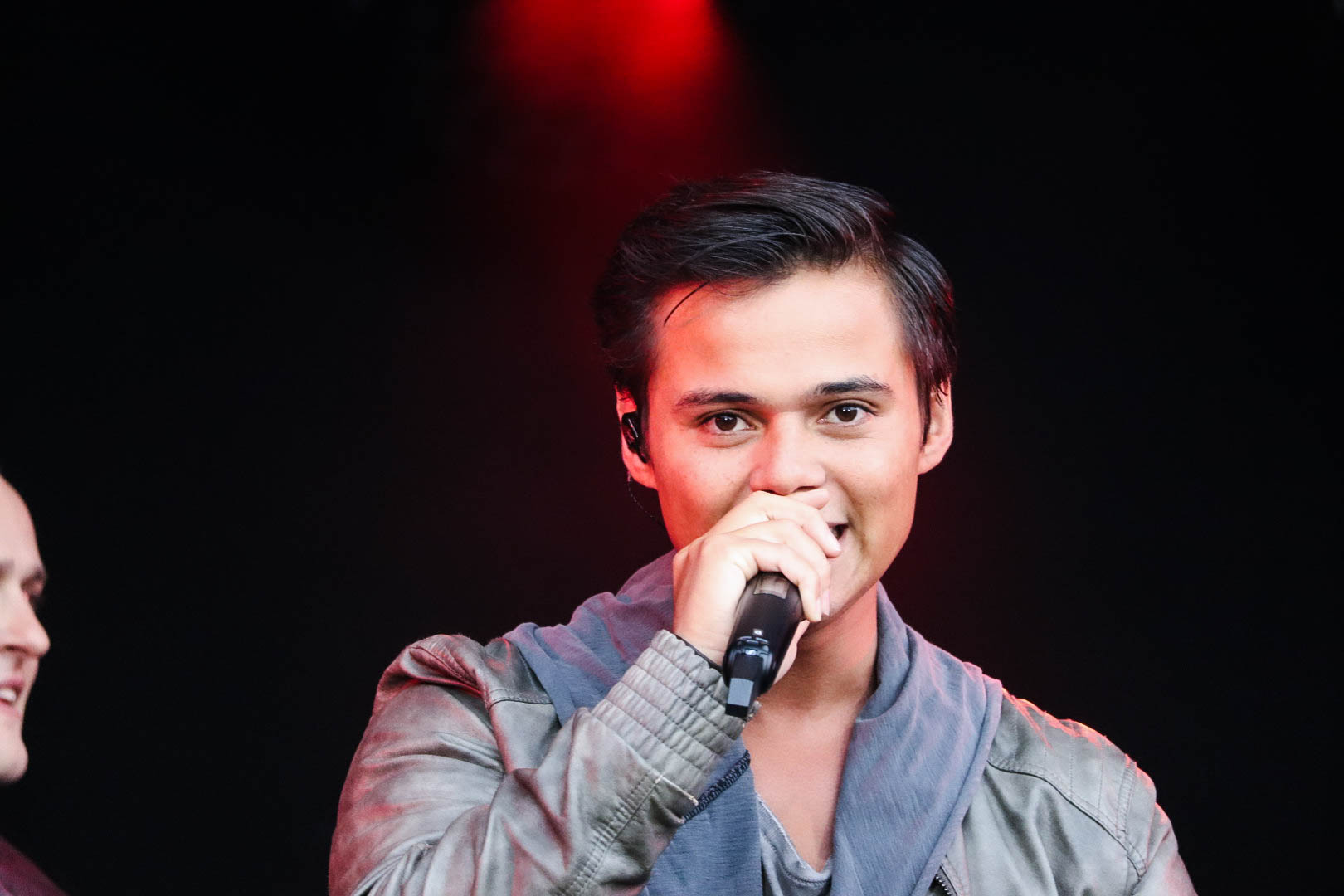
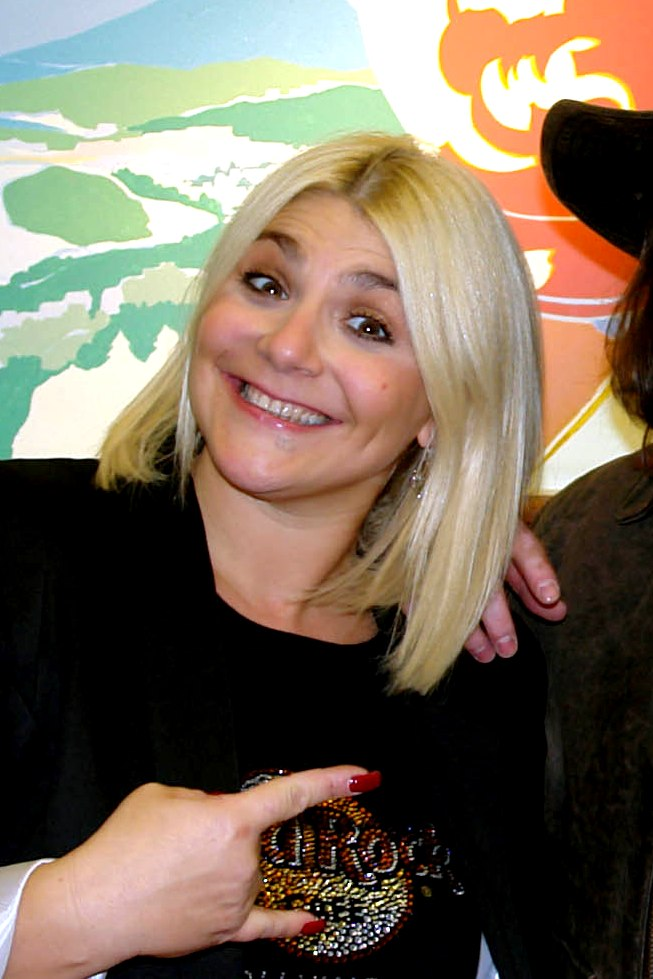
The celebrities who competed in the first season of The Masked Singer, pictured in order of elimination (L–R):

Bart Tommelein ("Monster"), Dina Tersago ("Libelle"), Sam Bettens ("Otter"), Kathleen Aerts ("Zeemeermin"), Ruth Beeckmans ("Aap"), Kevin Janssens ("Wolf"), Giovanni Kemper ("Duiker") and Sandra Kim ("Koningin")

Not pictured: Andy Peelman ("Duiveltje") and Nora Gharib ("Suikerspin")

== Episodes ==
=== Episode 1 (18 September) ===
Performances on the first episode
#	Stage name	Song	Identity	Result
1	Monkey	"Old Town Road" by Lil Nas X & Billy Ray Cyrus	undisclosed	RISK
2	Diver	"Dusk Till Dawn" by Zayn & Sia	undisclosed	WIN
3	Dragonfly	"La Isla Bonita" by Madonna	undisclosed	RISK
4	Devil	"Someone You Loved" by Lewis Capaldi	undisclosed	WIN
5	Monster	"Leef" by André Hazes Jr.	Bart Tommelein	OUT
6	Queen	"Unstoppable" by Sia	undisclosed	WIN
7	Otter	"Bad Guy" by Billie Eilish	undisclosed	RISK
8	Wolf	"Don't You (Forget About Me)" by Simple Minds	undisclosed	WIN

=== Episode 2 (25 September) ===
A new contestant "Mermaid" enters the competition.

Performances on the second episode
#	Stage name	Song	Identity	Result
1	Diver	"Treat You Better" by Shawn Mendes	undisclosed	WIN
2	Mermaid	"A Million Dreams" from The Greatest Showman	undisclosed	RISK
3	Devil	"I'll Be There For You" by The Rembrandts	undisclosed	RISK
4	Wolf	"Use Somebody" by Kings of Leon	undisclosed	WIN
5	Dragonfly	"Instagram" by Dimitri Vegas & Like Mike	Dina Tersago	OUT
6	Queen	"Don't Start Now" by Dua Lipa	undisclosed	WIN
7	Otter	"When Doves Cry" by Prince	undisclosed	RISK
8	Monkey	"Baby One More Time" by Britney Spears	undisclosed	WIN

=== Episode 3 (2 October) ===
A new contestant "Candyfloss" enters the competition.

Performances on the third episode
#	Stage name	Song	Identity	Result
1	Candyfloss	"Good as Hell" by Lizzo	undisclosed	WIN
2	Otter	"Feeling Good" by Michael Bublé	Sam Bettens	OUT
3	Monkey	"Shallow" by Lady Gaga & Bradley Cooper	undisclosed	WIN
4	Mermaid	"Physical" by Dua Lipa	undisclosed	RISK
5	Queen	"Writing's on the Wall" by Sam Smith	undisclosed	WIN
6	Wolf	"Man! I Feel Like a Woman!" by Shania Twain	undisclosed	RISK
7	Devil	"Youngblood" by 5 Seconds of Summer	undisclosed	RISK
8	Diver	"Livin' on a Prayer" by Bon Jovi	undisclosed	WIN

=== Episode 4 (9 October) ===
Performances on the fourth episode
#	Stage name	Song	Identity	Result
1	Devil	"Goud" by Bazart	Andy Peelman	OUT
2	Queen	"Blinding Lights" by The Weeknd	undisclosed	WIN
3	Monkey	"Don't Call Me Up" by Mabel	undisclosed	RISK
4	Diver	"Lay Me Down" by Sam Smith	undisclosed	WIN
5	Wolf	"My Prerogative" by Bobby Brown	undisclosed	RISK
6	Mermaid	"Wrecking Ball" by Miley Cyrus	undisclosed	WIN
7	Candyfloss	"Hoe het danst (English)" by Marco Borsato, Davina Michelle & Armin van Buuren	undisclosed	RISK

=== Episode 5 (16 October) ===
In this episode, only one of the masked singers at risk was saved from elimination by the judges. The bottom two contestants went up against each other in a sing-off. The audience chose the winner, the runner-up was unmasked.

Performances on the fifth episode
#	Stage name	Song	Identity	Result
1	Mermaid	"Bang Bang" by Jessie J, Ariana Grande & Nicki Minaj	undisclosed	RISK
2	Wolf	"Leave a Light On" by Tom Walker	undisclosed	WIN
3	Candyfloss	"Never Seen the Rain" by Tones and I	undisclosed	RISK
4	Monkey	"Creep" by Radiohead	undisclosed	WIN
5	Diver	"Heartbreaker" by Loïc Nottet	undisclosed	RISK
6	Queen	"Always Remember Us This Way" by Lady Gaga	undisclosed	WIN
Sing-off details
1	Mermaid	"Hold Back the River" by James Bay	Kathleen Aerts	OUT
2	Diver	"Hold Back the River" by James Bay	undisclosed	WIN

=== Episode 6 (23 October) ===
Each contestant performed a song. Two contestants were saved from elimination by the audience, one contestant was saved by the judges. The remaining two contestants went up against each other in a sing-off. The audience chose the winner, the runner-up was unmasked.

Performances on the sixth episode
#	Stage name	Song	Identity	Result
1	Candyfloss	"Kiss" by Prince	undisclosed	SAFE
2	Wolf	"Teeth" by 5 Seconds of Summer	undisclosed	RISK
3	Queen	"Euphoria" by Loreen	undisclosed	SAFE
4	Diver	"Jealous" by Labrinth	undisclosed	SAFE
5	Monkey	"California Gurls" by Katy Perry	undisclosed	RISK
Sing-off details
1	Monkey	"Shut Up and Dance" by Walk the Moon	Ruth Beeckmans	OUT
2	Wolf	"Shut Up and Dance" by Walk the Moon	undisclosed	WIN

=== Episode 7 (30 October) ===
Each contestant performed two songs. Two contestants were saved from elimination by the judges, one contestant was saved by the audience. The remaining contestant was unmasked.

Performances on the seventh episode
#	Stage name	Song	Identity	Result
1	Wolf	"Everybody (Backstreet's Back)" by Backstreet Boys	undisclosed	SAFE
1	Wolf	"Pony" by Ginuwine	undisclosed	SAFE
2	Diver	"Arcade" by Duncan Laurence	undisclosed	SAFE
2	Diver	"Think About Things" by Daði & Gagnamagnið	undisclosed	SAFE
3	Queen	"Girl on Fire" by Alicia Keys	undisclosed	SAFE
3	Queen	"California Dreamin" by Sia	undisclosed	SAFE
4	Candyfloss	"Who You Are" by Jessie J	Nora Gharib	OUT
4	Candyfloss	"Crazy in Love" by Beyoncé	Nora Gharib	OUT

=== Episode 8 (6 November) - Finale ===
After each contestant performed two songs, two of them were saved by the audience and the third one was unmasked. The remaining two contestants went up against each other in a sing-off. The audience chose the winner, after which both the runner-up and the winner were unmasked.

Performances on the eighth episode
#	Stage name	Song	Identity	Result
1	Diver	"High Hopes" by Panic! at the Disco	undisclosed	SAFE
1	Diver	"Dusk Till Dawn" by Zayn feat. Sia	undisclosed	SAFE
2	Wolf	"Wicked Game" by Chris Isaak	Kevin Janssens	THIRD
2	Wolf	"Man! I Feel Like a Woman!" by Shania Twain	Kevin Janssens	THIRD
3	Queen	"River Deep, Mountain High" by Tina Turner	undisclosed	SAFE
3	Queen	"Unstoppable" by Sia	undisclosed	SAFE
Sing-off details
1	Diver	"This Is Me" by Keala Settle	Giovanni Kemper	RUNNER-UP
2	Queen	"This Is Me" by Keala Settle	Sandra Kim	WINNER

== Ratings ==
Official ratings are taken from CIM, which includes viewers who watched the programme within 7 days of the original broadcoast.

Episode	Date	Viewers	Weekly ranking
1	18 September 2020	1.247.463	3
2	25 September 2020	1.511.762	1
3	2 October 2020	1.541.371	2
4	9 October 2020	1.577.015	1
5	16 October 2020	1.538.243	2
6	23 October 2020	1.591.552	1
7	30 October 2020	1.811.458	1
8	6 November 2020	2.048.885	1

== See also ==
- The Masked Singer franchise
