= The Masked Singer (Belgian TV series) season 2 =

The Masked Singer
- Season 2
- Promotional poster for season two, featuring "Red Deer", "Robots" and "Parrot"
- Starring: Jens Dendoncker; Julie Van den Steen; Karen Damen; Andy Peelman; Ruth Beeckmans; Kevin Janssens
- Hosted by: Niels Destadsbader
- Winner: Camille Dhont as "Miss Kitty"
- Runner-up: Loredana as "Knight"
- No. of episodes: 10

Release
- Original network: VTM
- Original release: 14 January – 18 March 2022

Season chronology
- ← Previous; Season 1 Next → Season 3

The second season of The Masked Singer based on the Masked Singer franchise which originated from the South Korean version of the show King of Mask Singer. It premiered on VTM on 14 January 2022 and is hosted by Niels Destadsbader. The season was won by singer Camille Dhont as "Miss Kitty", with singer Loredana finishing second as "Knight", and party chairman Conner Rousseau placing third as "Rabbit".

The second season started successfully. Highlights in this season was the unmasking of Johnny Logan, the first international contestant outside of the Benelux, and the unexpected unmasking of Robots in the fifth episode, one of the favorites of the public. The first duo ever in the Belgian series, Robots, turned out to be reallife partners Lize Feryn & Aster Nzeyimana. Another reallife couple, Tine Embrechts and Guga Baúl participated, not in duo but with the matching characters Flamme Fatale and Ice King, representing the elements fire and ice. The unexpected reveal of politician Conner Rousseau during the final made headlines and started a debate about politicians in entertainment programs. Winner Camille Dhont was the revelation of the season.

The season repeated the success of the first season and again became the best-watched program in Flanders in 2022.

== Production ==
After the success of the first season, a second season was ordered. The show was filmed during the summer of 2021. The security and confidentiality was even stricter since people knew the show this time with high fines, taping of smartphones and very planned exits for the contestants.

== Cast ==
=== Panelists ===
Panel members Julie Van den Steen, Jens Dendoncker and Karen Damen from the first season returned. Andy Peelman, Kevin Janssens and Ruth Beeckmans, who participated at the first season as masked singers, joined the panel. Of this group of 6 judges, a few of them would be selected for each episode. In the second season Bart Kaëll, Élodie Ouédraogo, Ann Tuts & Bart Peeters were guest judges.

Color key
Featured in this episode as a judge.

The Masked Singer Judges
Judge	Episodes									
Judge	1	2	3	4	5	6	7	8	9	10
Andy Peelman										
Jens Dendoncker										
Julie Van den Steen										
Karen Damen										
Kevin Janssens										
Ruth Beeckmans										
Guest Judge			Bart Kaëll	Élodie Ouédraogo	Ann Tuts	Bart Peeters	Stan Van Samang	Tinne Oltmans	An Lemmens	—N/a

== Contestants ==
The first contestants were introduced on 23 December. Robots were the first time a duo participated in the Belgian series. On 29 December all eight original contestants were introduced. At the same time four symbols alluding to four unseen characters were revealed.

Flamme Fatale joined the line-up in the second episode. Scorpion was introduced in the third episode. Two masked singers first appeared during the fourth episode, Rabbit & Ice King.

Stage name	Celebrity	Occupation	Episodes									
Stage name	Celebrity	Occupation	1	2	3	4	5	6	7	8	9	10
Miss Poes ("Miss Kitty")	Camille Dhont	Singer	WIN	WIN	WIN	WIN	WIN	SAFE (Note: Miss Poes gained immunity for the sixth episode due to the contestants voting on one mask to be safe from the episode’s proceedings.)	WIN	SAFE	SAFE	WINNER
Ridder ("Knight")	Loredana	Singer	WIN	WIN	WIN	WIN	WIN	WIN	WIN	SAFE	SAFE	RUNNER-UP
Konijn ("Rabbit") (WC)	Conner Rousseau	Politician				RISK	RISK	WIN	RISK	SAFE	SAFE	THIRD
Schorpioen ("Scorpion") (WC)	Klaasje Meijer	Singer			RISK	WIN	RISK	RISK	WIN	RISK	OUT	
IJskoning ("Ice King") (WC)	Guga Baúl	Actor				RISK	WIN	WIN	RISK	OUT		
Flamme Fatale ("Flame Fatale") (WC)	Tine Embrechts	Actress		RISK	RISK	RISK	WIN	RISK	OUT			
Papegaai ("Parrot")	Mathias Vergels	Actor	RISK	RISK	WIN	RISK	RISK	OUT				
Robots	Lize Feryn	Actress	WIN	WIN	WIN	RISK	OUT					
Robots	Aster Nzeyimana	Journalist	WIN	WIN	WIN	RISK	OUT					
Edelhert ("Red Deer")	Johnny Logan	Singer	RISK	RISK	RISK	OUT						
Cycloop ("Cyclops")	Bart Cannaerts	Comedian	RISK	WIN	OUT							
Radijsje ("Radish")	Erik Van Looy	Film director	WIN	OUT								
Roos ("Rose")	Yanina Wickmayer	Tennis player	OUT									

The masked singer was safe from elimination.
The masked singer won their face-off and remained in the competition.
The masked singer lost their face-off, but was not eliminated.
The masked singer was eliminated from the competition and unmasked upon their elimination.
The masked singer did not perform.
The masked singer won the competition.
The masked singer finished second.
The masked singer finished third.
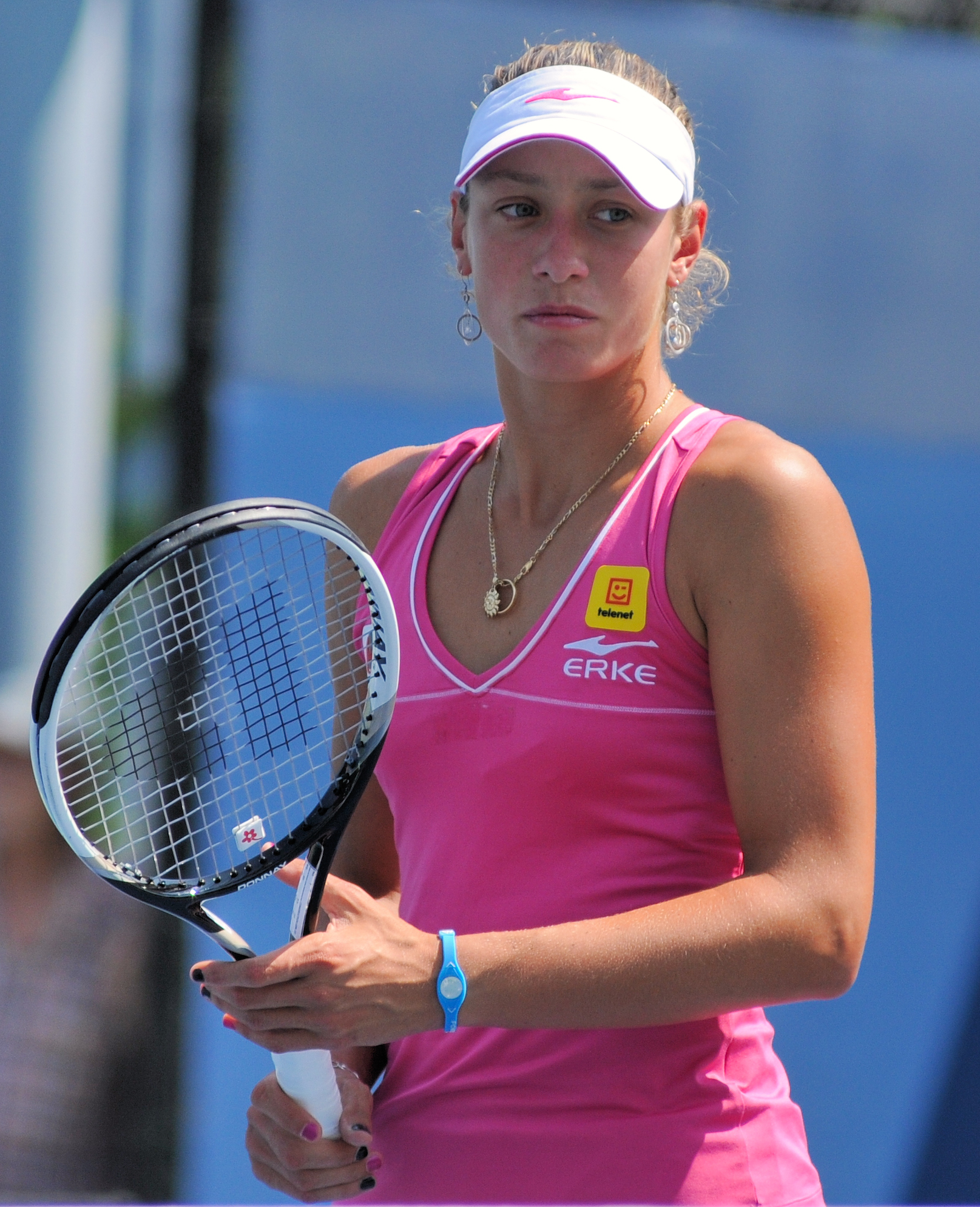
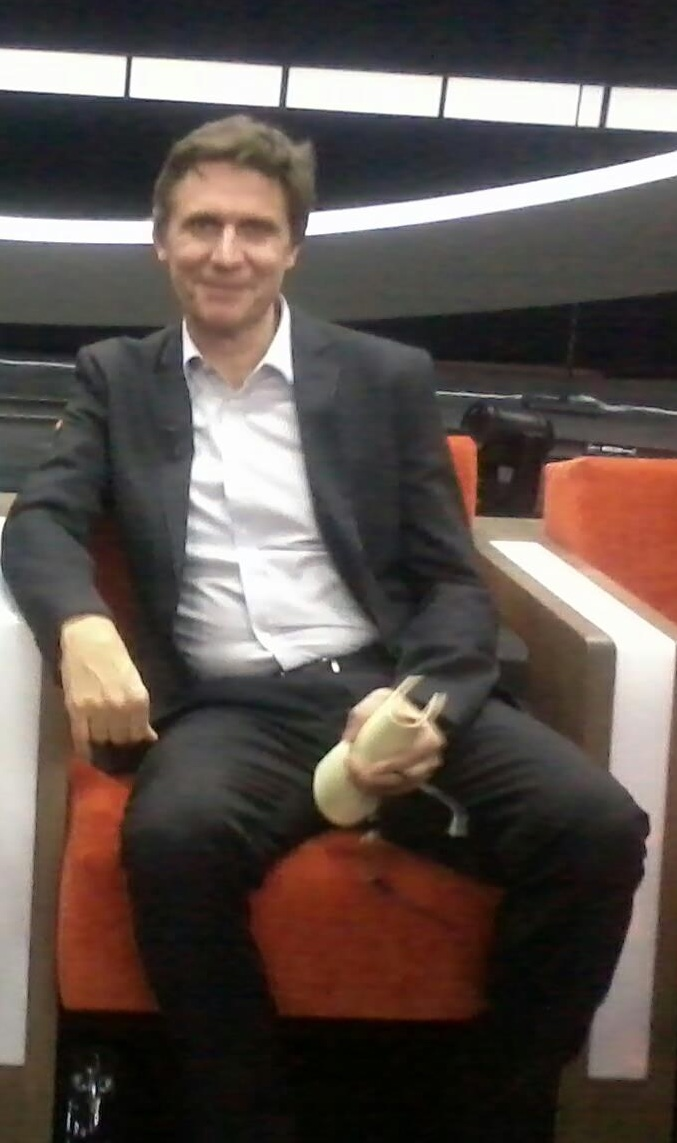
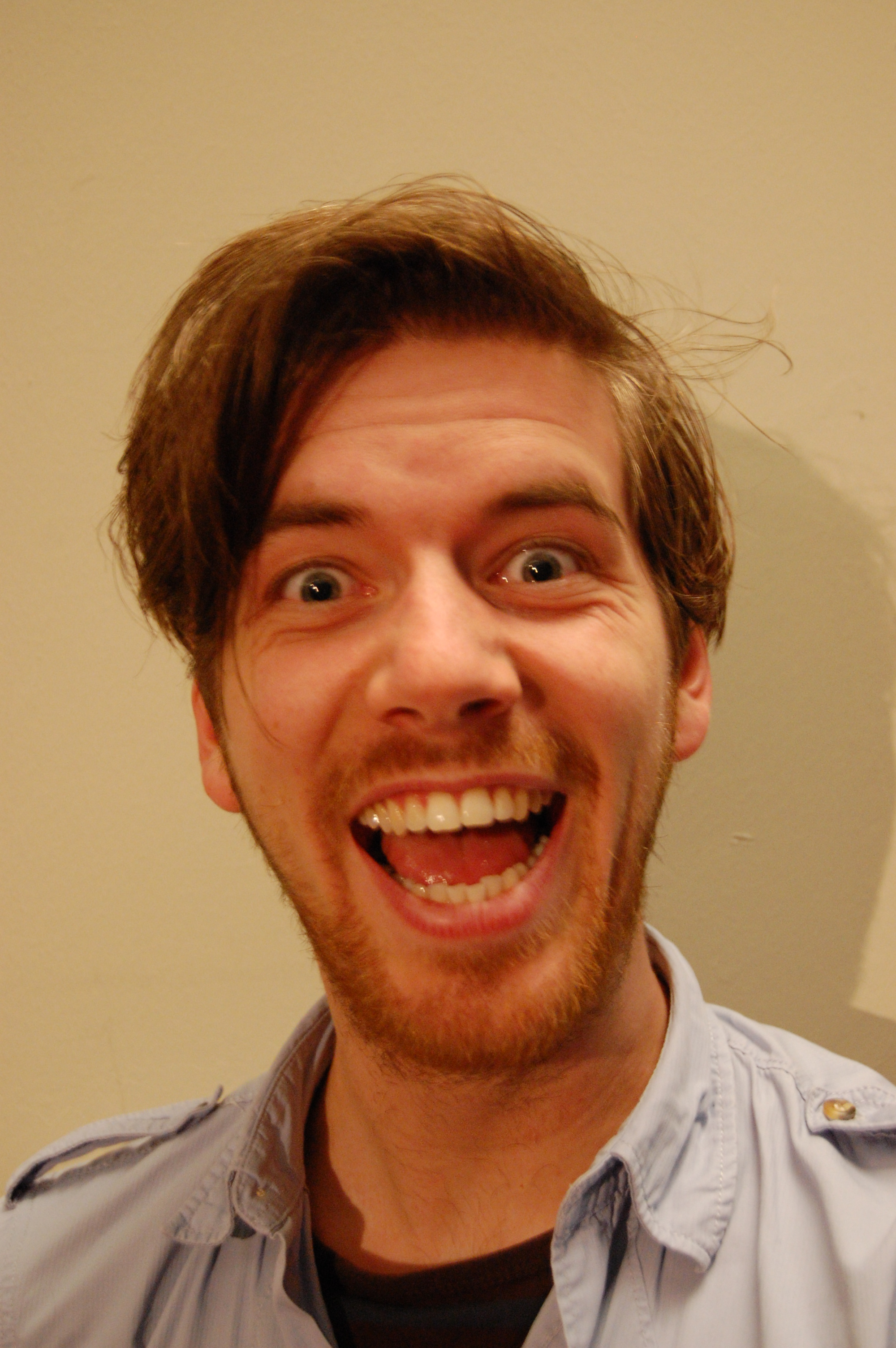
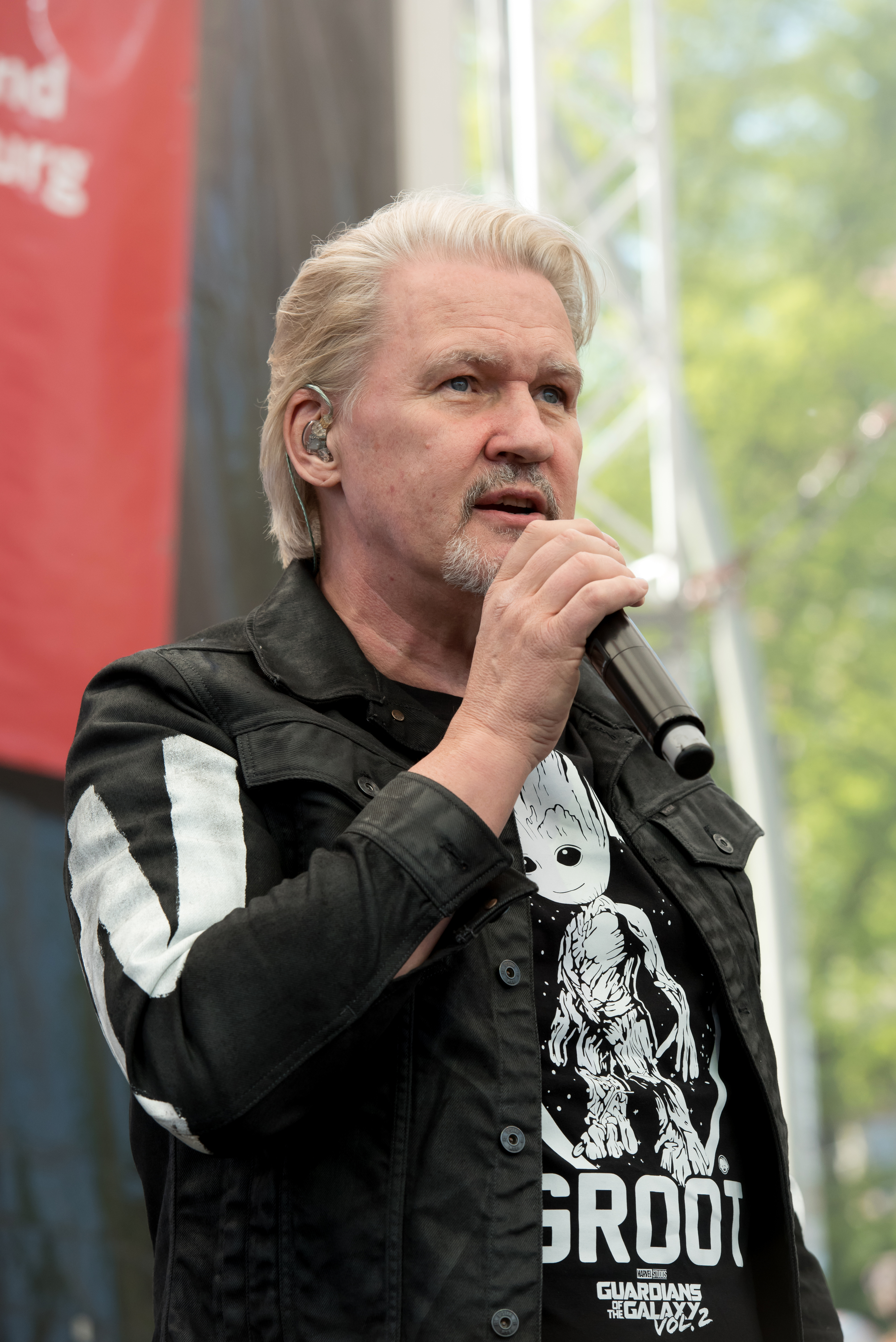
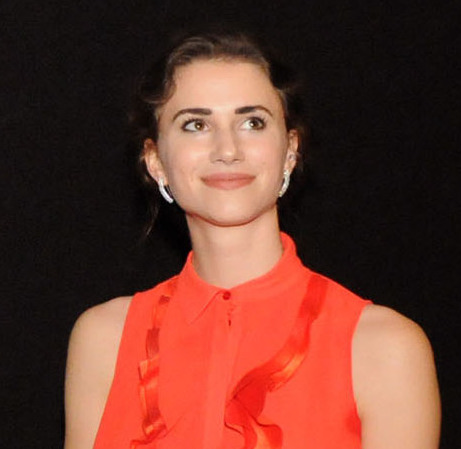
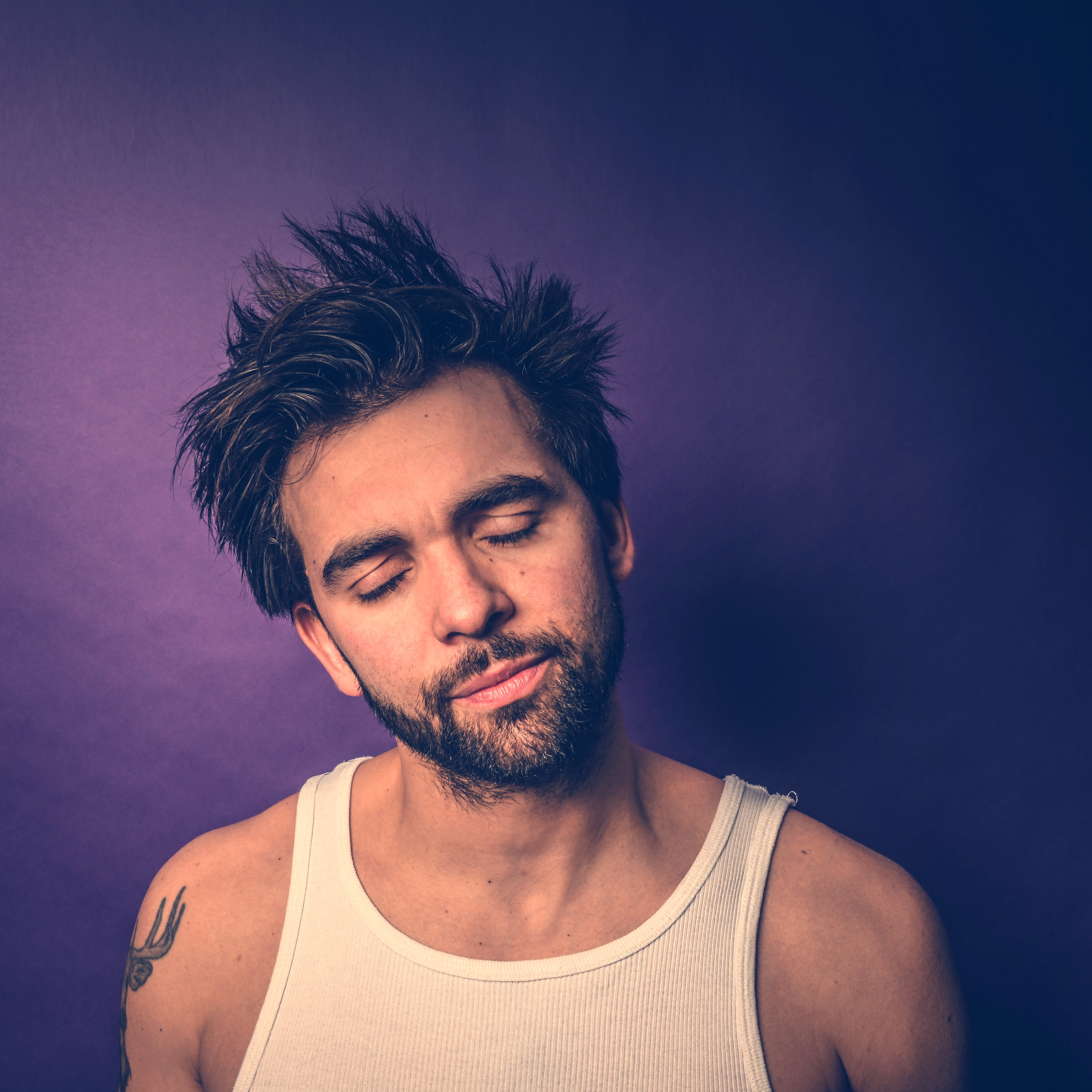
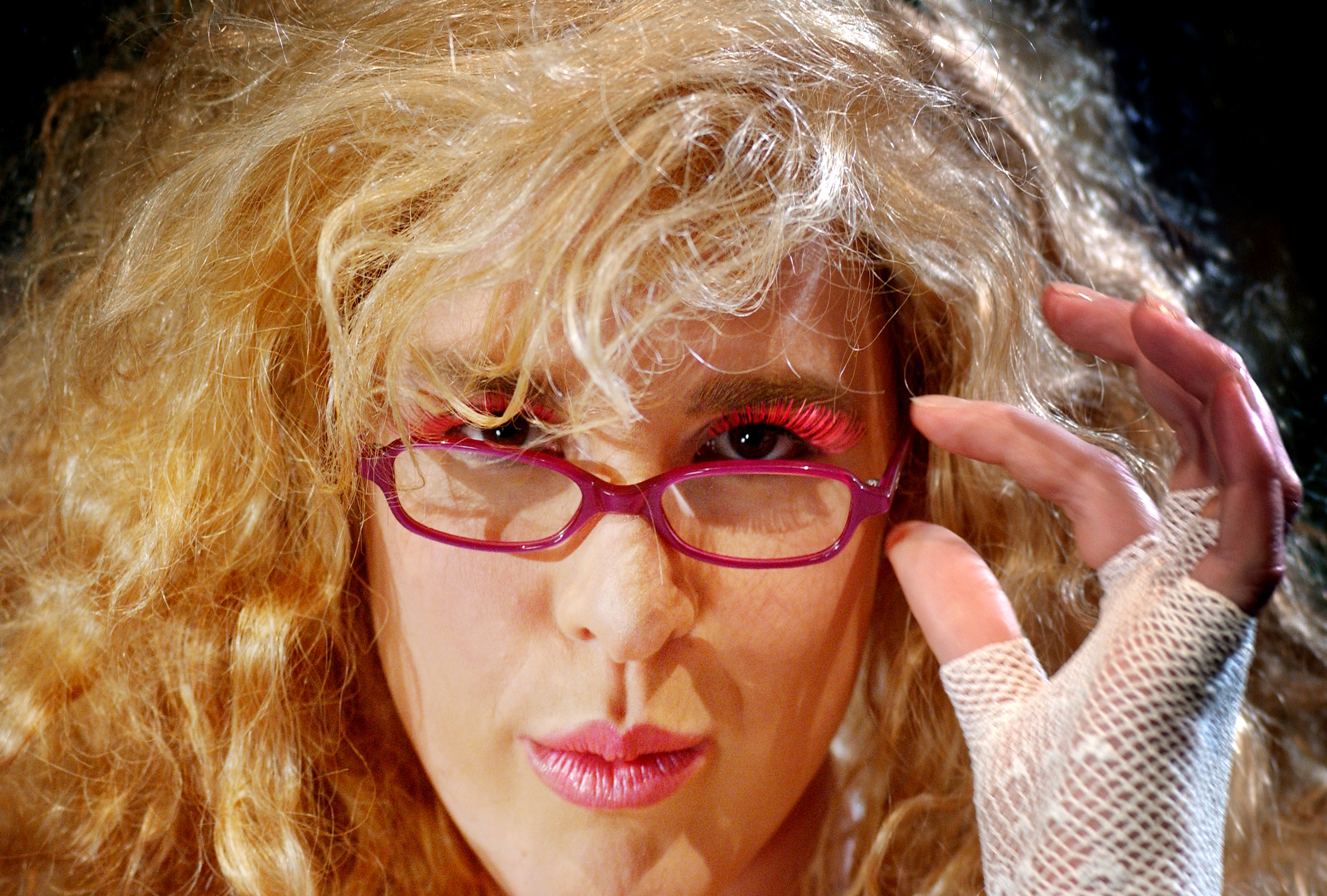
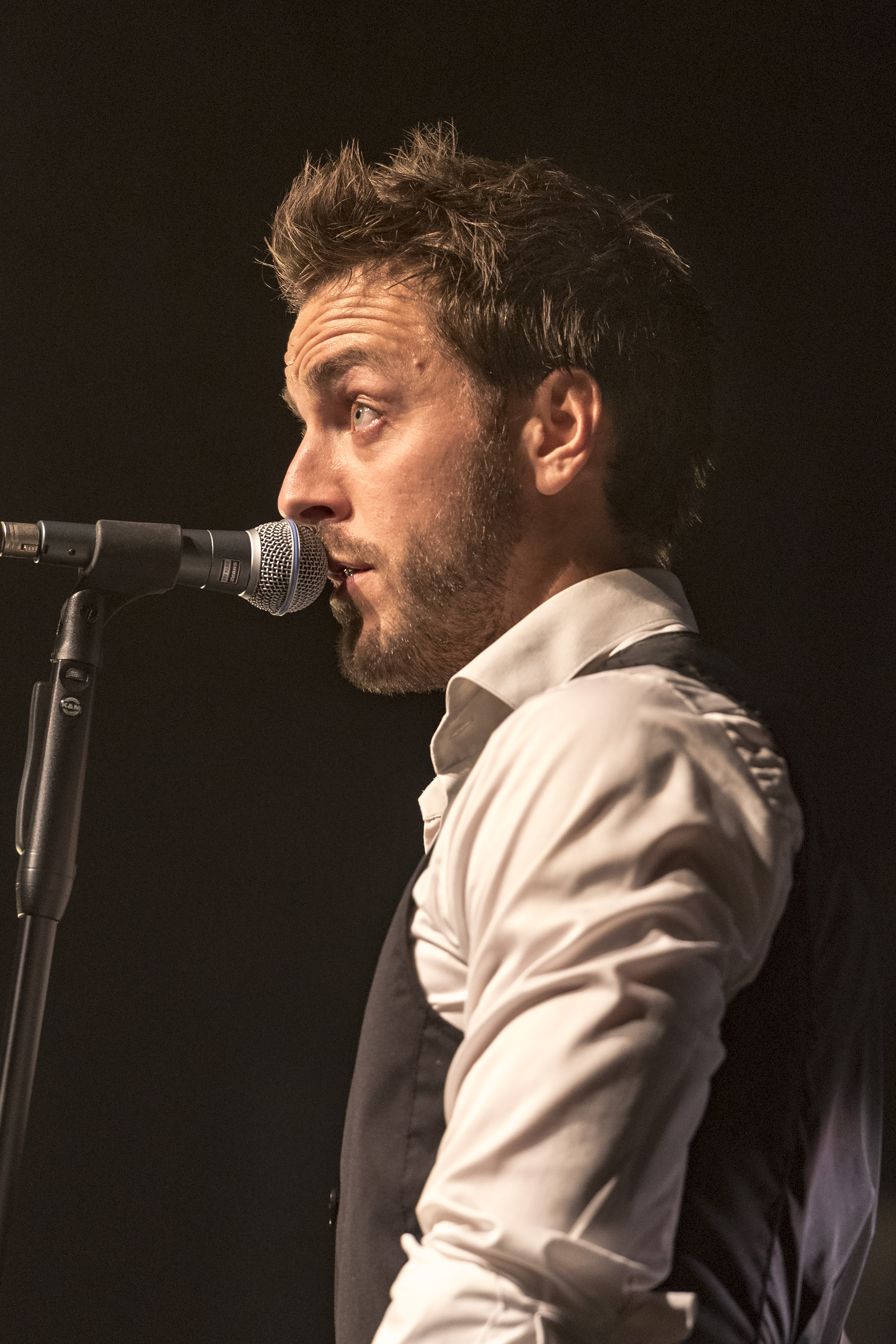
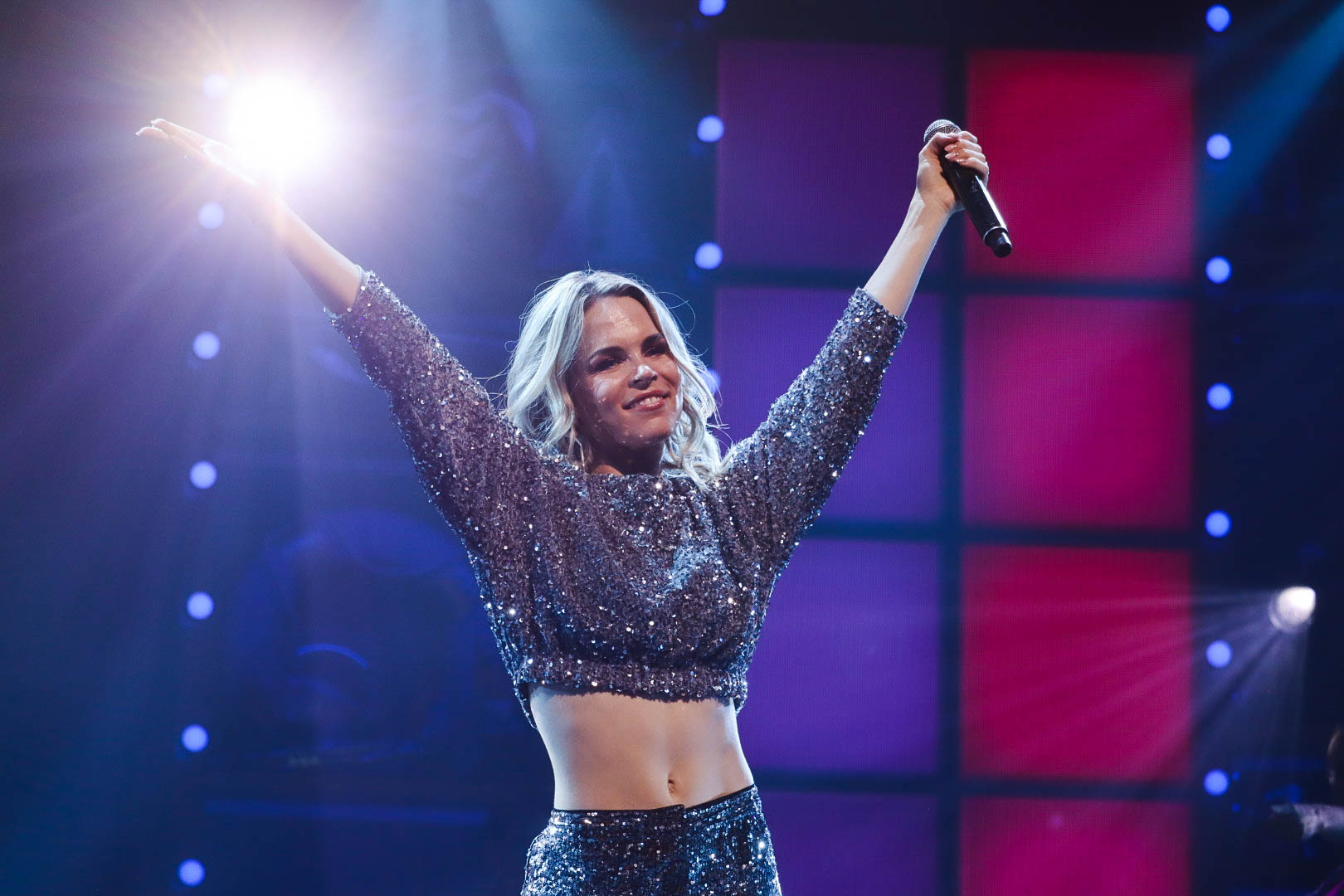
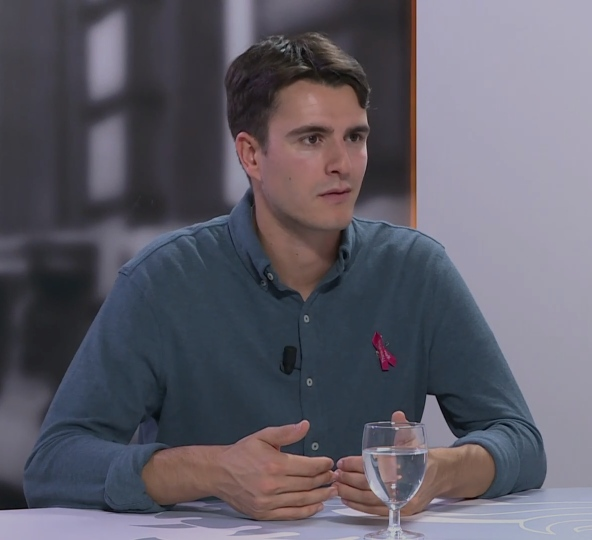
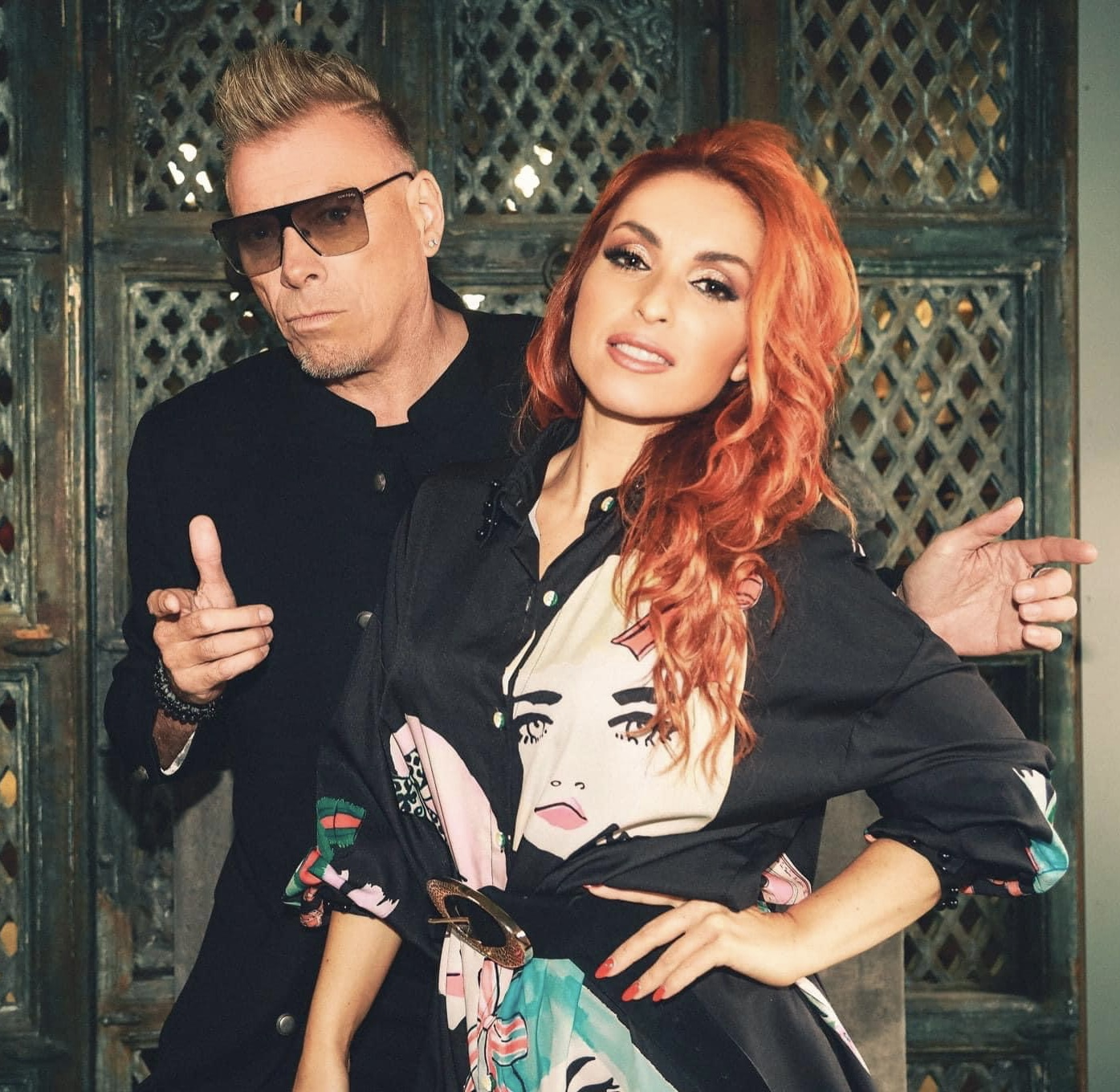
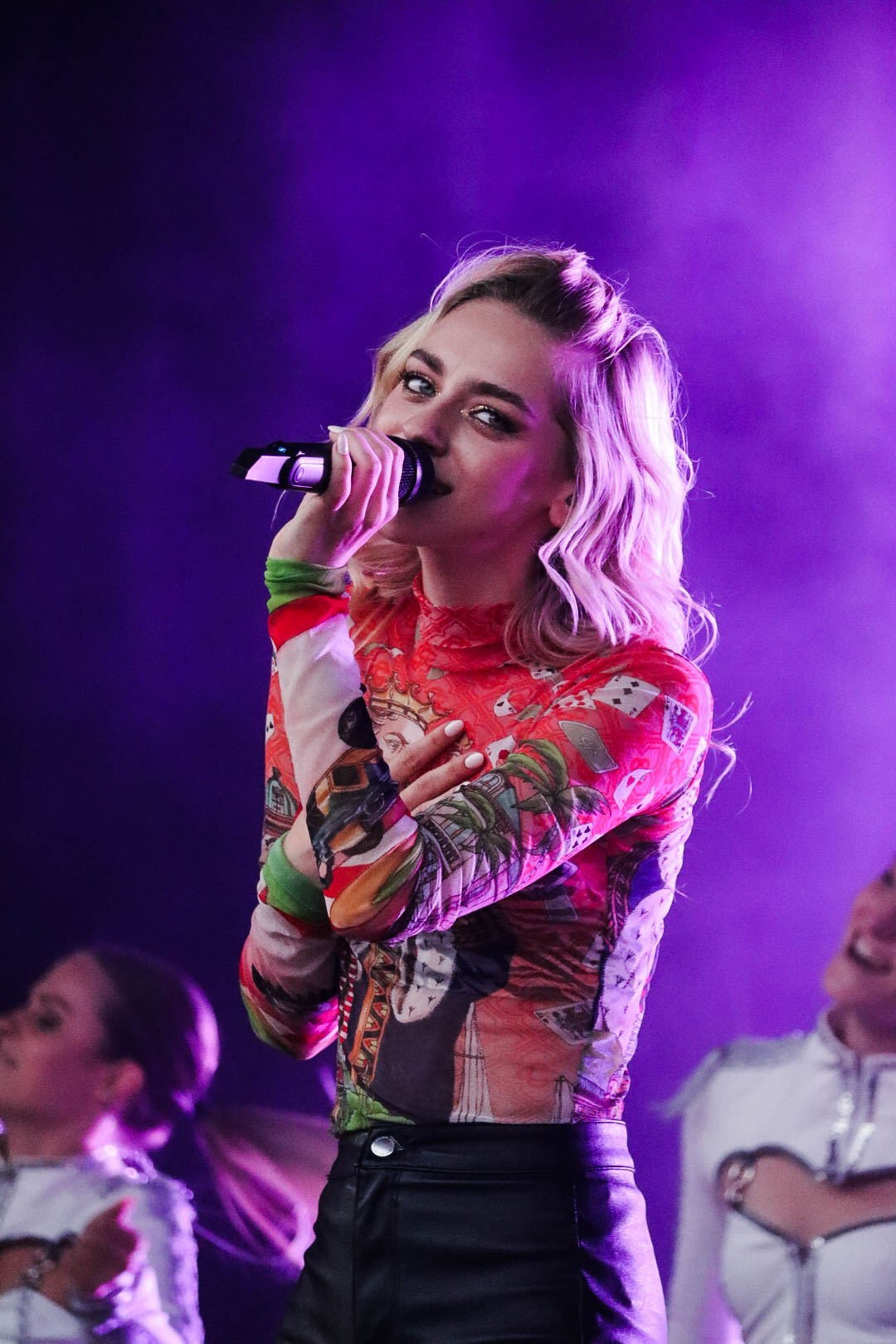
The celebrities who competed in the second season of The Masked Singer, pictured in order of elimination (L–R):

Yanina Wickmayer ("Roos"), Erik Van Looy ("Radijsje"), Bart Cannaerts ("Cycloop"), Johnny Logan ("Edelhert"), Lize Feryn ("Robots"), Mathis Vergels ("Papegaai"), Tine Embrechts ("Flamme Fatale"), Guga Baúl ("IJskoning"), Klaasje Meijer ("Schorpioen"), Conner Rosseau ("Konijn"), Loredana ("Ridder"), and Camile Dhont ("Miss Poes")

Not pictured: Aster Nzeyimana ("Robots")

== Episodes ==
=== Episode 1 (14 January) ===
Performances on the first episode
#	Stage name	Song	Identity	Result
1	Miss Kitty	"Levitating" by Dua Lipa	undisclosed	WIN
2	Cyclops	"Human" by Rag'n'Bone Man	undisclosed	RISK
3	Robots	"City of Stars" from La La Land	undisclosed	WIN
3	Robots	"City of Stars" from La La Land	undisclosed	WIN
4	Rose	"Tik Tok" by Kesha	Yanina Wickmayer	OUT
5	Knight	"Nobody's Wife" by Anouk	undisclosed	WIN
6	Parrot	"Talk Dirty" by Jason Derulo	undisclosed	RISK
7	Radish	"Light My Fire" by The Doors	undisclosed	WIN
8	Red Deer	"Rolling in the Deep" by Adele	undisclosed	RISK

=== Episode 2 (21 January) ===
A new contestant "Flame Fatale" enters the competition.

Performances on the second episode
#	Stage name	Song	Identity	Result
1	Flame Fatale	"Stop This Flame" by Celeste	undisclosed	RISK
2	Robots	"Cheap Thrills" by Sia feat. Sean Paul	undisclosed	WIN
2	Robots	"Cheap Thrills" by Sia feat. Sean Paul	undisclosed	WIN
3	Red Deer	"Sorry" by Justin Bieber	undisclosed	RISK
4	Cyclops	"Every Little Thing She Does Is Magic" by The Police	undisclosed	WIN
5	Miss Kitty	"Drivers License" by Olivia Rodrigo	undisclosed	WIN
6	Parrot	"Watermelon Sugar" by Harry Styles	undisclosed	RISK
7	Knight	"I'll Never Love Again" by Lady Gaga	undisclosed	WIN
8	Radish	"It's Not Unusual" by Tom Jones	Erik Van Looy	OUT

=== Episode 3 (28 January) ===
A new contestant "Scorpion" enters the competition.

Performances on the third episode
#	Stage name	Song	Identity	Result
1	Scorpion	"S&M" by Rihanna	undisclosed	RISK
2	Parrot	"Have a Little Faith in Me" by John Hiatt	undisclosed	WIN
3	Cyclops	"Shake It Off" by Taylor Swift	Bart Cannaerts	OUT
4	Robots	"Lovely" by Billie Eilish and Khalid	undisclosed	WIN
4	Robots	"Lovely" by Billie Eilish and Khalid	undisclosed	WIN
5	Flame Fatale	"Black Velvet" by Alannah Myles	undisclosed	RISK
6	Miss Kitty	"You Oughta Know" by Alanis Morissette	undisclosed	WIN
7	Red Deer	"Diamonds" by Rihanna	undisclosed	RISK
8	Knight	"Midnight Sky" by Miley Cyrus	undisclosed	WIN

=== Episode 4 (4 February) ===
Two new contestants "Rabbit" and "Ice King" enter the competition.

Performances on the fourth episode
#	Stage name	Song	Identity	Result
1	Rabbit	"DJ Got Us Fallin' in Love" by Usher feat. Pitbull	undisclosed	RISK
2	Miss Kitty	"No Time to Die" by Billie Eilish	undisclosed	WIN
3	Red Deer	"Million Reasons" by Lady Gaga	Johnny Logan	OUT
4	Ice King	"Before You Go" by Lewis Capaldi	undisclosed	RISK
5	Flame Fatale	"Sway" by Michael Bublé	undisclosed	RISK
6	Knight	"Wonder" by Shawn Mendes	undisclosed	WIN
7	Robots	"Promiscuous" by Nelly Furtado feat. Timbaland	undisclosed	RISK
7	Robots	"Promiscuous" by Nelly Furtado feat. Timbaland	undisclosed	RISK
8	Scorpion	"Girls Like Us" by Zoe Wees	undisclosed	WIN
9	Parrot	"Hot Stuff" by Kygo & Donna Summer	undisclosed	RISK

=== Episode 5 (11 February) ===
Performances on the fifth episode
#	Stage name	Song	Identity	Result
1	Miss Kitty	"My Head & My Heart" by Ava Max	undisclosed	WIN
2	Robots	"Empire State of Mind" by Jay-Z feat. Alicia Keys	Lize Feryn	OUT
2	Robots	"Empire State of Mind" by Jay-Z feat. Alicia Keys	Aster Nzeyimana	OUT
3	Parrot	"Drag Me Down" by One Direction	undisclosed	RISK
4	Flame Fatale	"Firestone" by Kygo	undisclosed	WIN
5	Scorpion	"Oops!... I Did It Again" by Britney Spears	undisclosed	RISK
6	Ice King	"Someone to You" by Banners	undisclosed	WIN
7	Rabbit	"If I Ain't Got You" by Alicia Keys	undisclosed	RISK
8	Knight	"Dance Again" by Jennifer Lopez feat. Pitbull	undisclosed	WIN

=== Episode 6 (18 February) ===
Performances on the sixth episode
#	Stage name	Song	Identity	Result
1	Miss Kitty	"Earth Song" by Michael Jackson	undisclosed	SAFE
2	Rabbit	"Cooler than Me" by Mike Posner	undisclosed	WIN
3	Parrot	"Table of Fools" by IBE	Mathias Vergels	OUT
4	"Cake by the Ocean" by DNCE			
5	Flame Fatale	"Nothing Breaks Like a Heart" by Mark Ronson feat. Miley Cyrus	undisclosed	RISK
6	Ice King	"Uprising" by Muse	undisclosed	WIN
7	"When the Rain Begins to Fall" by Jermaine Jackson & Pia Zadora			
8	Scorpion	"Reggaetón Lento" by CNCO & Little Mix	undisclosed	RISK
9	Knight	"Alive" by Sia	undisclosed	WIN
10	"Symphony" by Clean Bandit feat. Zara Larsson			

=== Episode 7 (25 February) ===
- Group performance: "I Gotta Feeling" by Black Eyed Peas

Performances on the seventh episode
#	Stage name	Song	Identity	Result
1	Knight	"Ritual" by Tiësto, Jonas Blue & Rita Ora	undisclosed	WIN
2	Flame Fatale	"Mad About You" by Hooverphonic	undisclosed	RISK
3	Rabbit	"The World's Greatest" by R. Kelly	undisclosed	RISK
4	Scorpion	"Believe" by Cher	undisclosed	WIN
5	Miss Kitty	"Emotions" by Mariah Carey	undisclosed	WIN
6	Ice King	"Les Lacs du Connemara" by Michel Sardou	undisclosed	RISK
Sing-off details
1	Flame Fatale	"The One and Only" by Chesney Hawkes	Tine Embrechts	OUT
2	Ice King	"The One and Only" by Chesney Hawkes	undisclosed	WIN

=== Episode 8 (4 March) ===
- Group performance: "Learning to Fly" by Sheppard

Performances on the eighth episode
#	Stage name	Song	Identity	Result
1	Scorpion	"Good 4 U" by Olivia Rodrigo	undisclosed	RISK
2	Ice King	"With or Without You" by U2	undisclosed	RISK
3	Rabbit	"If I Can't Have You" by Shawn Mendes	undisclosed	SAFE
4	Knight	"Je t'aime" by Lara Fabian	undisclosed	SAFE
5	Miss Kitty	"Show Me How You Burlesque" by Christina Aguilera	undisclosed	SAFE
Sing-off details
1	Ice King	"Counting Stars" by OneRepublic	Guga Baúl	OUT
2	Scorpion	"Counting Stars" by OneRepublic	undisclosed	WIN

=== Episode 9 (11 March) ===
Each contestant performed two songs. Two contestants were saved from elimination by the judges, one contestant was saved by the audience. The remaining contestant was unmasked.

Performances on the ninth episode
#	Stage name	Song	Identity	Result
1	Knight	"What About Us" by Pink	undisclosed	SAFE
1	Knight	"Run" by Leona Lewis	undisclosed	SAFE
2	Scorpion	"Soon We'll Be Found" by Sia	Klaasje Meijer	OUT
2	Scorpion	"Woman Like Me" by Little Mix	Klaasje Meijer	OUT
3	Miss Kitty	"Ella, elle l'a" by Kate Ryan	undisclosed	SAFE
3	Miss Kitty	"Angels Like You" by Miley Cyrus	undisclosed	SAFE
4	Rabbit	"Little Bit of Love" by Tom Grennan	undisclosed	SAFE
4	Rabbit	"Dynamite" by Taio Cruz	undisclosed	SAFE

=== Episode 10 (18 March) - Finale ===
- Group performance: "The Best" by Tina Turner
- Robots Performance: "Rewrite The Stars" from The Greatest Showman

After each contestant performed two songs, two of them will be saved by the audience and the third one is unmasked. The remaining two contestants go up against each other in a sing-off. The audience choose the winner, after which both the runner-up and the winner were unmasked.

Performances on the tenth episode
#	Stage name	Song	Identity	Result
1	Knight	"The Edge of Glory" by Lady Gaga	undisclosed	SAFE
1	Knight	"Alive" by Sia	undisclosed	SAFE
2	Rabbit	"Impossible" by James Arthur	Conner Rousseau	THIRD
2	Rabbit	"DJ Got Us Fallin' in Love" by Usher feat. Pitbull	Conner Rousseau	THIRD
3	Miss Kitty	"Listen" by Beyoncé	undisclosed	SAFE
3	Miss Kitty	"Emotions" by Mariah Carey	undisclosed	SAFE
Sing-off details
1	Knight	"Let It Go" by Demi Lovato	Loredana	RUNNER-UP
2	Miss Kitty	"Let It Go" by Demi Lovato	Camille Dhont	WINNER

== Ratings ==
Official ratings are taken from CIM, which includes viewers who watched the programme within 7 days of the original broadcoast.

Episode	Date	Viewers	Weekly rank
1	14 January 2022	1.764.658	1
2	21 January 2022	1.801.726	1
3	28 January 2022	1.907.046	1
4	4 February 2022	1.812.664	1
5	11 February 2022	1.747.144	1
6	18 February 2022	1.802.189	1
7	25 February 2022	1.653.930	1
8	4 March 2022	1.620.897	1
9	11 March 2022	1.617.641	1

== See also ==
- The Masked Singer franchise
