= A Real Vermeer =

2016 film

- Film poster
- Directed by: Rudolf van den Berg
- Written by: Jan Eilander; Rudolf van den Berg
- Produced by: Jeroen Koolbergen; San Fu Maltha; Reinier Selen
- Starring: Jeroen Spitzenberger; Lize Feryn; Roeland Fernhout; Porgy Franssen; Dewi Reijs; Mingus Dagelet
- Cinematography: Goert Giltay
- Edited by: Ewin Ryckaert
- Music by: André Dziezuk
- Distributed by: Cinéart
- Release date: 3 November 2016
- Running time: 115 minutes
- Countries: Netherlands; Belgium; Luxembourg
- Language: Dutch
- Budget: €3.9 million
- Box office: $92,906

A Real Vermeer (Dutch: Een echte Vermeer) is a 2016 Dutch biographical film about art forger Han van Meegeren directed by Rudolf van den Berg. It was listed as one of eleven films that could be selected as the Dutch submission for the Best Foreign Language Film at the 89th Academy Awards, but it was not nominated.

== Cast ==
- Jeroen Spitzenberger as Han van Meegeren
- Lize Feryn as Jolanka Lakatos
- Roeland Fernhout as Theo van der Pas
- Porgy Franssen as Abraham Bredius
- Dewi Reijs as Anna van Meegeren
- Mingus Dagelet as Jac van Meegeren
- Raymond Thiry as Prosecutor
- Claude Humbert as Hermann Göring
