= Ann Van Elsen =

Belgian model

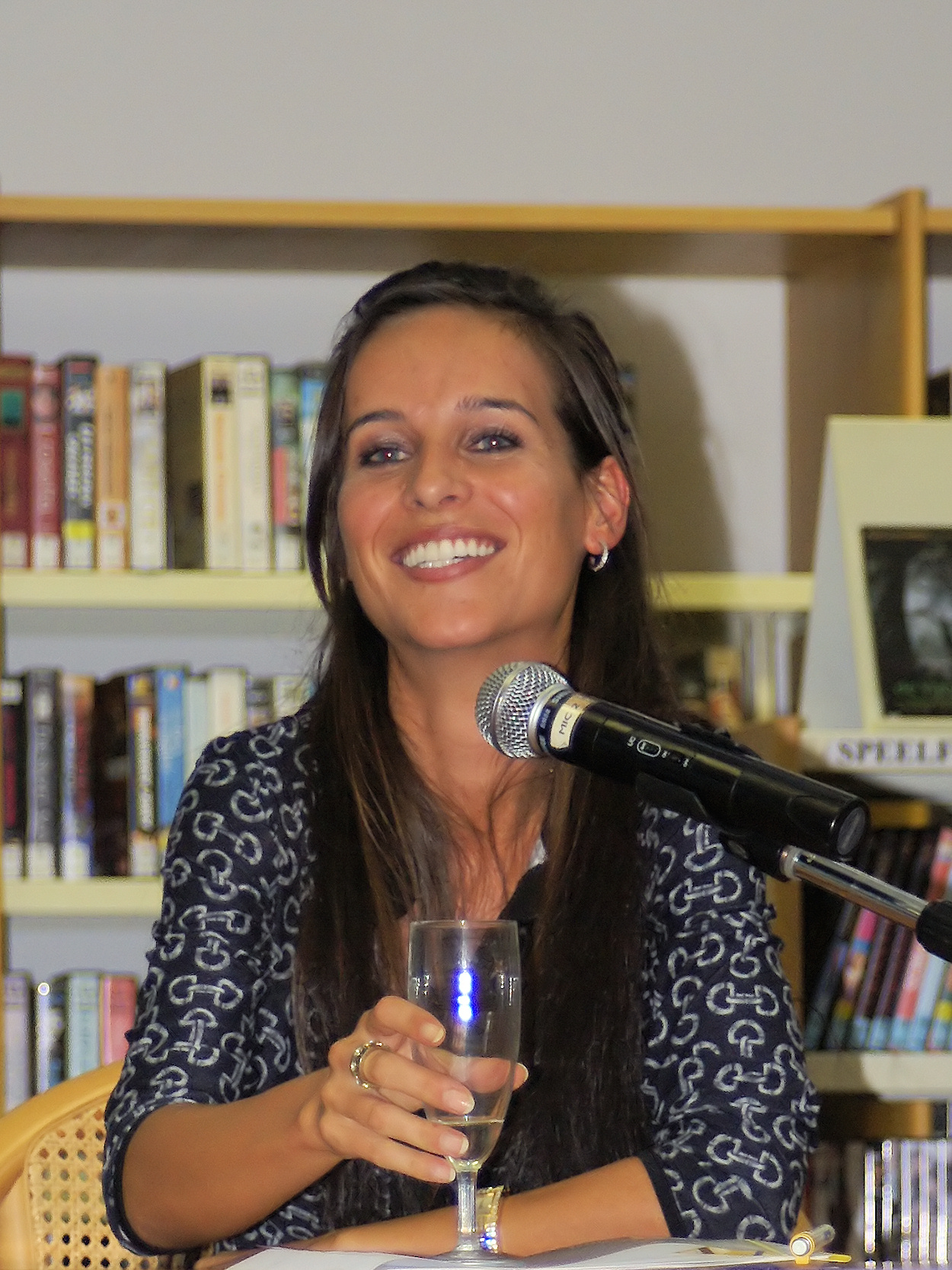
- Van Elsen at Knokke Heist library, Belgium in 2006
- Born: 27 December 1979 (age 46); Mol, Belgium

Ann Van Elsen (born 27 December 1979) is a Belgian TV host, model and beauty pageant titleholder who was crowned Miss Belgium 2002.

== Biography ==
Van Elsen was born in Mol. After finishing her marketing studies, she obtained her Master's degree in business economics in 2006. She spread her studies over several years to accommodate her professional career.

== Beauty pageants and modeling ==
Van Elsen's first appearance on the cover of a magazine was unorthodox: the magazine solicited photographs from its readers, promising to feature one on its cover, which ended up being Van Elsen. This lauded appearance inspired her to enter beauty pageants like Miss Antwerp, Miss Belgium and Miss Universe.

In 2002 Van Elsen won both the Miss Antwerp and Miss Belgium pageants. These victories rendered her eligible to enter the Miss World and Miss Universe competitions.

In protest of the conviction of Amina Lawal, Van Elsen was one of the candidates who refused to participate in the Miss World competition held in Nigeria in 2002.

She appeared in the January 2008 edition of Playboy. She accepted the deal because it stipulated that Playboy would donate part of the photo-shoot payment to Music For Life, a goodwill annual charity of radio station Studio Brussel.

== Media career ==
=== Television ===
On television, Van Elsen has presented several programs on Belgian channels TV1 and VT4, including Mediamadammen (since October 2002), Huizenjacht, Onder Hoogspanning, De Brandkast (2005), Supertalent in Vlaanderen (2007) and Summerdate. In June 2005 Van Elsen signed an exclusive television contract with VT4, where she performed the tasks of an in-vision continuity announcer (since 2003) and hosted several other TV shows as well.

In 2006, Van Elsen presented the first prize to the winner of the "Pinanti is Pinanti" penalty taking competition in the TV1 sports program Studio 1 op zondag, football player Désiré Mbonabucya. During the ceremony in the Koning Boudewijnstadion, she tried to show she had some footballing skills as well.

For two years Van Elsen regularly appeared on the TV1 music show Het Swingpaleis, on which she was the team captain.

In 2013 she presented the TV show Singles on Vijf.

=== Radio ===
In January 2008 Van Elsen went to work for Radio Donna for the Sunday Match program. She presented between 20.00h and 23.00h. After the re-establishment of Donna as MNM (5 January 2009) she presented together with Dave Peters on The Ann & Dave Show. In early 2012 she also presented the Monday early morning program MNM Request. Since 2010 she continues to co-host various programs on MNM, including a summer period mid-morning to noon program.

== Personal life ==
Ann Van Elsen was married to Belgian soccer player Gunter Van Handenhoven, who is the brother of singer Sandrine Van Handenhoven.

Preceded by Dina Tersago	Miss Antwerp; 2002	Succeeded by Zoe Van Gastel
Preceded by Dina Tersago	Miss Belgium; 2002	Succeeded by Julie Taton
