= Supertalent in Vlaanderen =

Belgian television series

- Genre: Reality television
- Presented by: Ann Van Elsen; Felice
- Judges: Gert Verhulst; Paul Jambers; Martine Prenen
- Country of origin: Belgium
- Original language: Dutch
- No. of seasons: 1

Original release
- Network: VT4
- Release: 15 March – 10 May 2007

Related
- Britain's Got Talent; Belgium's Got Talent

Supertalent in Vlaanderen is the first Flemish adaptation of Simon Cowell's Got Talent franchise. It was produced by Fremantle Belgium and aired on VT4 (later rebranded VIER/Play4) in spring 2007. The series premiered on 15 March 2007 and concluded on 10 May 2007. The show followed the standard Got Talent format: open auditions before a live studio audience, judges with buzzers to stop poor acts, followed by semi-finals and a televised finale. Episodes featured a wide variety of acts (singers, dancers, magicians, etc.), each given two minutes to impress a three-member jury.

== Production, network, hosts and judges ==
Supertalent in Vlaanderen was created under license from the international Got Talent format. It was produced by Fremantle (Belgium) and aired on VT4, the Flemish-language channel (later renamed VIER). The show was co-presented by Flemish TV personalities Dré "Felice" Steemans and Ann Van Elsen. The judging panel comprised veteran Belgian media figures Paul Jambers, Martine Prenen, and Gert Verhulst. (Each judge had a red "buzzer" to stop a performance deemed unworthy.) These hosts and judges were consistent throughout the only season.

== Season 1 (2007): Episodes and results ==
The inaugural (and only) season ran for nine weeks in 2007. During early April 2007, the program held four audition episodes, selecting semifinalists by judges' votes (with public input after the semis). The live final aired on Friday 11 May 2007. In that finale, the singing trio Triple E (sisters Tillia, Lori and Demi Eestermans from Roeselare) was crowned winner, earning the €50,000 top prize. The runners-up were the S&L Demo Team and a percussion act called Percussive. According to contemporary reports, the final drew about 422,617 viewers (a 22% market share). – a solid performance for VT4. (FrontView Magazine summarized the outcome: "Felice en Ann Van Elsen kronen Triple E tot 'Supertalent in Vlaanderen'" and noted the audience peak and prize money.)

== Broadcast and ratings ==
By all accounts, Supertalent Season 1 performed respectably in its slot. Media reporting confirms the dates and viewership: FrontView Magazine noted the finale's ratings peak (422,617 viewers, 22% share). No official weekly ratings summary is published online, but the final's figures suggest the show was moderately successful for VT4. (VT4 was a smaller commercial channel; a 22% share indicates strong interest.).

== Contestants and notable acts ==
Triple E's win was the highlight of the season. They went on to sign a management and recording deal after the show (reports indicate they signed with The Castle Company, which managed other Belgian acts). Other semifinalists gained brief local fame, but none became national stars. (For example, a Belgian news article later noted that the Eestermans sisters were offered a record contract after their win.) In addition to the winners and top three, the series showcased a variety of local talent – from dance crews to magicians – though no contestant achieved international notoriety.

== Controversies and media reaction ==
The only major behind-the-scenes incident involved the semifinals. After the first week of eliminations, Supertalent producers received backlash from contestants. VT4 and Fremantle Belgium announced that six acts previously dropped by the judges would be reinstated into the semifinals to appease participants and viewers. The VT4 network manager apologized for "poor communication" and allowed all 38 semifinalists to stay on until the public vote in the finale.

Aside from that, media commentary was generally light. Flemish press noted the show's variety and entertainment value, and some reviews quipped on the judges' blunt styles (for instance, articles commented that Martine Prenen was more polite to contestants than the others). However, no major scandals or controversies are documented beyond the semifinal reinstatement. The show was treated as a straightforward new talent contest in the Flemish TV landscape.

== Cancellation and planned revival ==
At season's end, VT4 publicly announced plans for a second edition. In May 2007, FrontView noted that "In 2008 komt er alvast een nieuw seizoen van Supertalent" and that candidates could already apply. Indeed, by April 2008 VT4 was marketing a second Supertalent. Audtions were planned for a fall 2008 second season.

However, despite these announcements, the second season never actually aired. No episodes of Supertalent appeared after 2007. VT4 (rebranded VIER in 2012) quietly dropped the franchise. No official explanation was given; it was likely due to shifting priorities and the launch of newer talent formats on Flemish TV (e.g. The Voice van Vlaanderen premiered in 2011). In any case, the Supertalent series was effectively cancelled after its inaugural run, with all plans for 2008 abandoned. (By late 2008, VT4's schedule contained other programming instead.)

== Revivals and spin-offs ==
While Supertalent in Vlaanderen was discontinued, the Got Talent concept resurfaced in Belgium years later. In autumn 2012 the format returned on Flemish television as "Belgium's Got Talent" on VTM. The new series, also produced by Fremantle, was hosted by Koen Wauters (with later co-host Laura Tesoro) and featured a new panel of judges. (Belgium's Got Talent ran multi-year seasons starting in 2012, effectively filling the vacuum left by Supertalent.) Meanwhile, French-speaking Belgium launched its own adaptation called La Belgique a du talent on RTL-TVI in 2012. Both of these shows share the Simon Cowell franchise lineage with Supertalent, but there are no direct spin-offs or junior editions of Supertalent itself. No revival of Supertalent in Vlaanderen has been announced; the brand remains a single-season curiosity.
