= Dina Tersago =

Belgian model

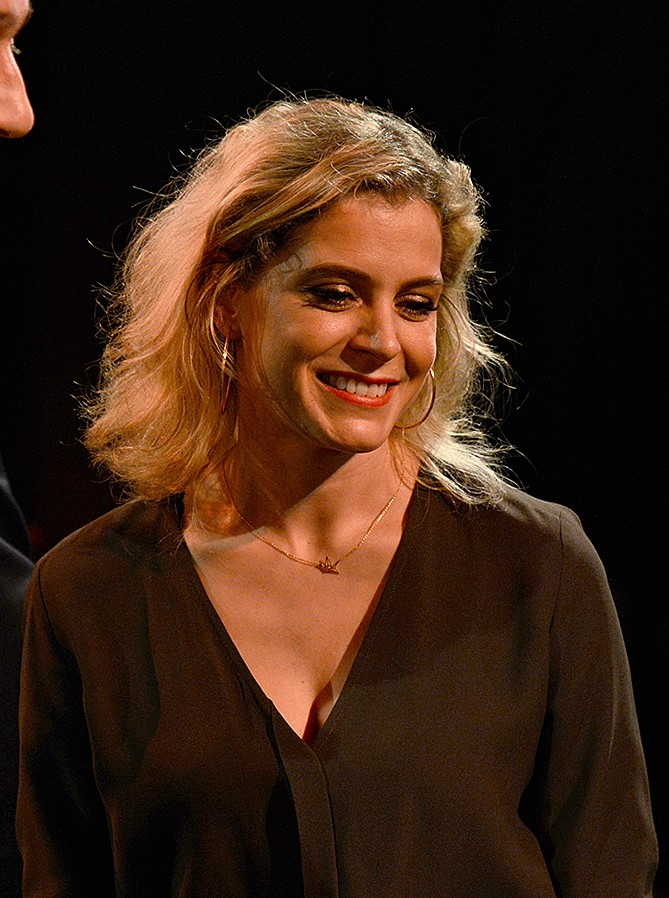
Dina Tersago presenting an awards show at Agriflanders 2019

Dina Tersago (born 3 January 1979 in Puurs, Antwerp) is a Belgian actress and beauty pageant titleholder who She was crowned Miss Belgium 2001 and represented her country at both Miss Universe 2001 and Miss World 2001.

She is now a TV personality, hosting Boer zkt. Vrouw, Superhond 2007 en Superhond 2008 and starring in the fictional soap Brix and Bongers, introduced in Het Geslacht De Pauw, alongside Bart De Pauw, afterwards he was replaced by Tom Van Landuyt. She was the host of health and fitness programme Let's Get Physical which began in 2013.

Preceded by	Miss Antwerp; 2001	Succeeded by Ann Van Elsen
Preceded by Joke Van De Velde	Miss Belgium; 2001	Succeeded by Ann Van Elsen
Preceded by None	Sterren op de Dansvloer winner Season 1 (2006 with Wim Gevaert)	Succeeded by Pieter Loridon & Daisy Croes
