= Lize Feryn =

Belgian television actress and model

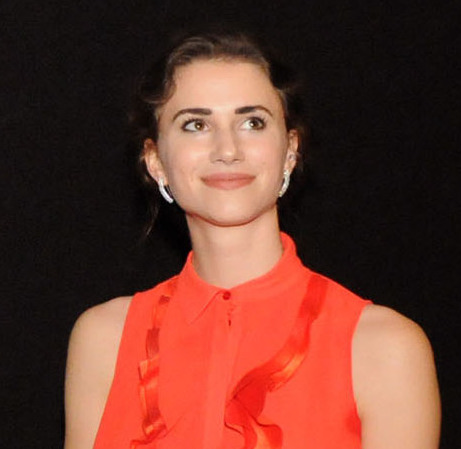
- Lize Feryn in 2016
- Born: 4 March 1993 (age 33); Deerlijk, Belgium
- Occupations: Actress, model and author
- Years active: 2012–present

Lize Feryn (born 4 March 1993) is a Belgian actress, model and author of Flemish descent.

== Biography ==
Lize Feryn earned a degree in artistic secondary education in 2011 in Drama & Diction at the Leuven Lemmens Institute. She also had a part-time arts education in Diction at the Peter Benoit Academy in Harelbeke. She stopped full-time training in Art History as it was incompatible with her work as a model for IMM Models in New York City and Milan.

Feryn played the lead role of Marie Boesman in the drama In Flanders Fields by Jan Matthys. Her character is a 15-years old girl who quickly matures amidst the horrors of the First World War. She was cast in 2011 and performed the role in 2012. The ten-part series aired in January 2014 on the VRT-owned Eén. Based on the series, she wrote the book Dagboek van Marie (Diary of Marie), published in 2014 by Manteau. Her second book, Dagboek van Marie : Brieven van Marie verschenen (Diary of Marie: Letters of Marie) was published in 2014.

Additionally she guest starred in Aspe (as Nathalie Creemers), Vermist (as Denise Klaessens), in the short film Andromeda and in the BBC-historical drama The White Queen as Princess Bona from France. She worked in several musical productions for Harelbeke amateur company Arte Del Sueno.

As a model she participated in several fashion shows for Calvin Klein, United Colors of Benetton, Carlo Pignatelli, Natan and Joanne Vanden Avenne and posed for magazines such as Verena, Marie Claire, Glam*It, Pure and Velvet.

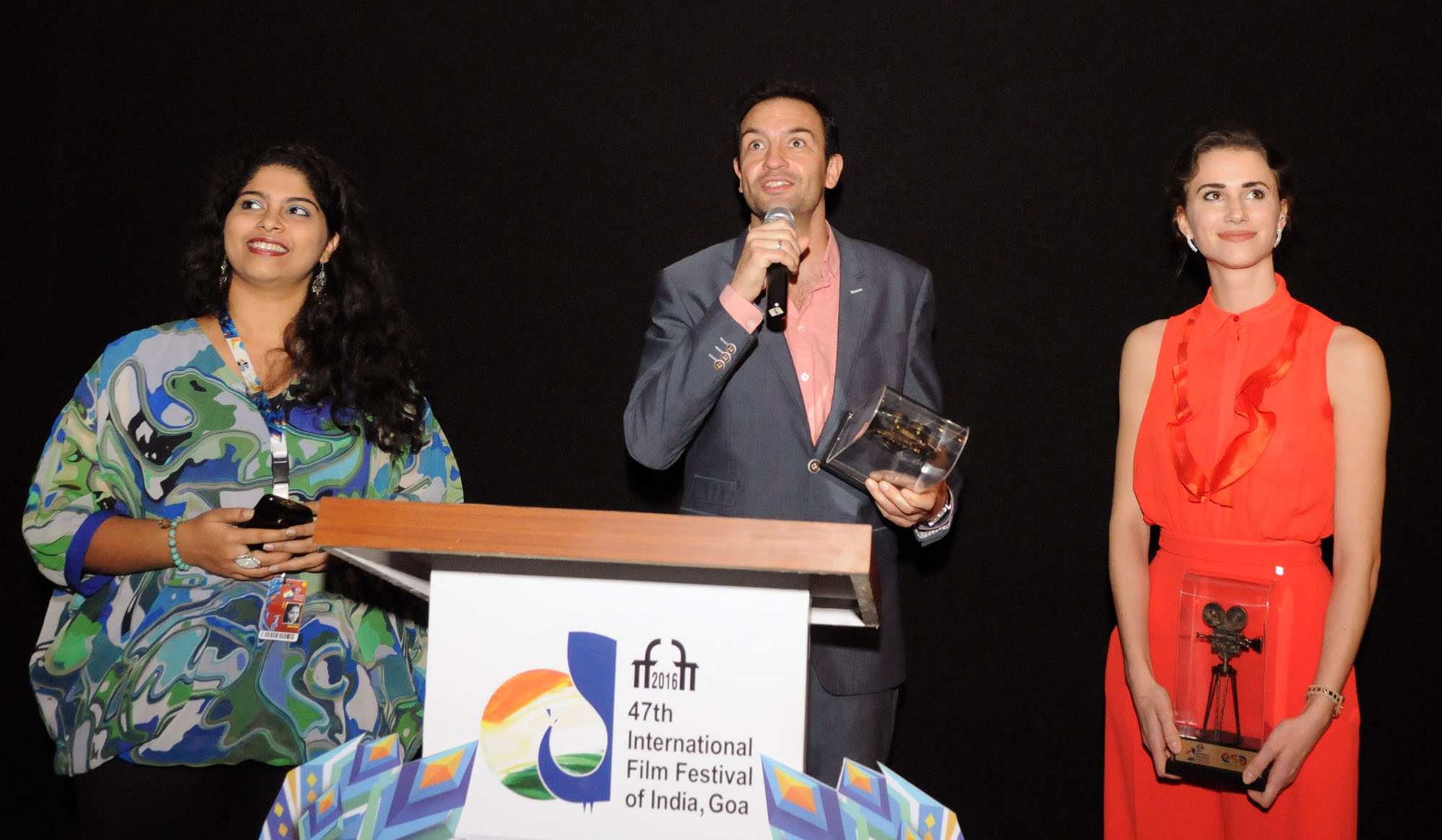
Feryn (right) at IFFI (2016)

Feryn starred in 2015 in the Flemish Eén television's comedy series "Voor wat hoort wat", directed by Christophe Van Rompuy, about young criminals who must do community services in a nursing home as part of their "reform".

In September 2016 the Dutch period drama A Real Vermeer premiered starring Feryn playing leading lady to Dutch actor Jeroen Spitzenberger.

Feryn starred in #HetIsIngewikkeld, the Flemish remake of the popular Danish dramedy "Splitting Up Together" directed by Lenny Van Wesemael. Here she plays a young married mother of three.

In 2018 Feryn played opposite German stars, Katja Riemann, Oliver Masucci and Samuel Finzi in the film SUBS. Directed by Germany's acclaimed director Oskar Roehler, Feryn plays in German with a Russian accent.

Besides being an actress and model Feryn designs leather goods. In October 2015, together with her sisters Yanne and Mira she grounded their label "Feryn" which produces hand crafted handbags, backpacks, wallets and other such goods.

== Filmography ==
Filmography
Year	Title	Role	Notes
2013	The White Queen	Princess Bona of France	
2013	Andromeda	Sara	Short film
2014	De klas van Frieda	Herself (subject teacher)	Episode 5.2
2014	In Flanders Fields	Marie Boesman	Protagonist
2014	Vermist	Denise Klaessens	
2014	Aspe	Nathalie Creemers	
2015	Voor wat hoort wat	Amber	Protagonist
2015	Echo	Yuna	Short film
2016	About a Boy Who Ate an Oakwood Chair	Truus	Short film
2016	A Real Vermeer	Jolanka Lakatos	Protagonist
2016	Emperor	Catherine 'The Nun'	Post-production
2017	#HetIsIngewikkeld	Valerie	
2018	Subs	Lana	

== Publications ==
- Dagboek van Marie (Diary of Marie). Manteau. 2014. ISBN 9789022329375.
- DVM2: Brieven van Marie (Diary of Marie: Letters of Marie). Manteau. 2014.
